= Paris Foreign Missions Society =

Roman Catholic society of apostolic life

- Société des Missions Etrangères de Paris
- Abbreviation: Post-nominal letters: MEP
- Formation: 1658; 368 years ago
- Founder: Bishop François Pallu, MEP
- Type: Society of Apostolic Life of Pontifical Right (for Men)
- Headquarters: 128 Rue du Bac, 75007, Paris, France
- Members: 189 members (178 priests) as of 2018
- Superior General: Vincent Sénéchal
- Affiliations: Catholic Church
- Website: missionsetrangeres.com

The Society of Foreign Missions of Paris (French: Société des Missions Etrangères de Paris, pronounced [sɔsjete de misjɔ̃z etʁɑ̃ʒɛʁ də paʁi], MEP) is a Catholic missionary organization. It is not a religious institute, but an organization of secular priests and lay persons dedicated to missionary work in foreign lands.

The Society of Foreign Missions of Paris was established 1658–1663. In 1659, instructions for establishment of the Paris Foreign Missions Society were given by Rome's Sacred Congregation for the Propagation of the Faith. This marked the creation of a missionary institution that, for the first time, did not depend on the control of the traditional missionary and colonial powers of Spain or Portugal. In the 350 years since its foundation, the institution has sent more than 4,200 missionary priests to Asia and North America. Their mission is to adapt to local customs and languages, develop a native clergy, and keep close contacts with Rome.

In the 19th century, local persecutions of missionary priests of the Paris Foreign Missions Society were often a pretext for French military intervention in Asia. In Vietnam, such persecutions were used by the French government to justify the armed interventions of Jean-Baptiste Cécille and Charles Rigault de Genouilly. In China, the murder of the priest Auguste Chapdelaine became the casus belli for the French involvement in the Second Opium War in 1856. In Korea, persecutions were used to justify the 1866 French campaign against Korea.

Today, the Paris Foreign Missions Society remains an active institution in the evangelization of Asia.

== Background ==
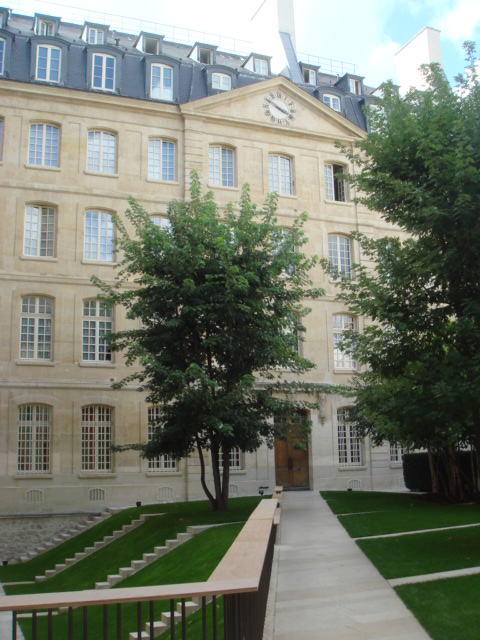
Building of the Missions étrangères de Paris, 128 Rue du Bac, Paris

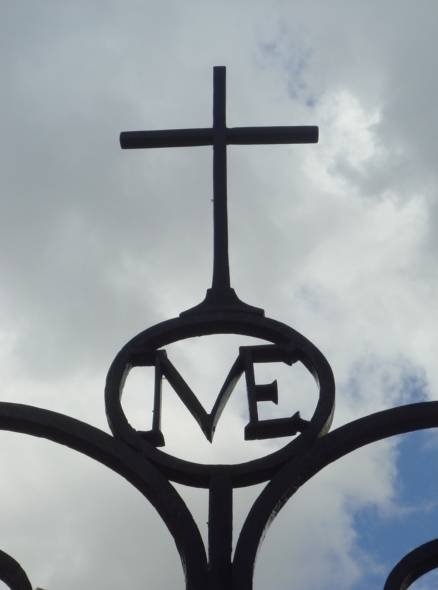
Symbol of the Missions Étrangères de Paris

The traditional colonial powers of Spain and Portugal had initially received from the Pope an exclusive agreement to evangelize conquered lands, a system known as Padroado Real in Portuguese and Patronato real in Spanish. After some time however, Rome grew dissatisfied with the Padroado system, due to its limited means, strong involvement with politics, and dependence on the kings of Spain and Portugal for any decision.

From a territorial standpoint also, Portugal had been losing ground against the new colonial powers of England and the Dutch Republic, meaning that it was becoming less capable of evangelizing new territories. In territories that it used to control, Portugal had seen some disasters; for instance, Japanese Christianity was eradicated from around 1620.

Finally, Catholic officials had doubts about the efficacy of religious orders, such as the Dominicans, Franciscans, Jesuits or Barnabites, since they were highly vulnerable in case of persecutions. They did not seem able to develop local clergy, who would be less vulnerable to state persecution. Sending bishops to develop a strong local clergy seemed to be the solution to achieve future expansion:

"We have all reason to fear that what happened to the Church of Japan could also happen to the Church of Annam, because these kings, in Tonkin as well as in Cochinchina, are very powerful and accustomed to war... It is necessary that the Holy See, by its own movement, give pastors to these Oriental regions where Christians multiply in a marvellous way, lest, without bishops, these men die without sacrament and manifestly risk damnation." Alexandre de Rhodes.

As early as 1622, Pope Gregory XV, wishing to take back control of the missionary efforts, had established the Sacred Congregation for the Propagation of the Faith (Congregatio de Propaganda Fide, commonly known as Propaganda) with the objective of bringing non-Catholic Christians to the Catholic faith, and also inhabitants of the American continent and Asia. In order to do so, Rome resurrected the system of Apostolic vicars, who would report directly to Rome in their missionary efforts, and would be responsible to create a native clergy.

In the field, violent conflicts would erupt between the Padroado and the Propaganda during the 17th and 18th centuries. (When the first missionaries of the Paris Foreign Missions Society were sent to the Far East, the Portuguese missionaries were ordered to capture them and send them to Lisbon). The creation of the Paris Foreign Missions Society was well-aligned with Rome's efforts to develop the role of the Propaganda.

== Establishment ==
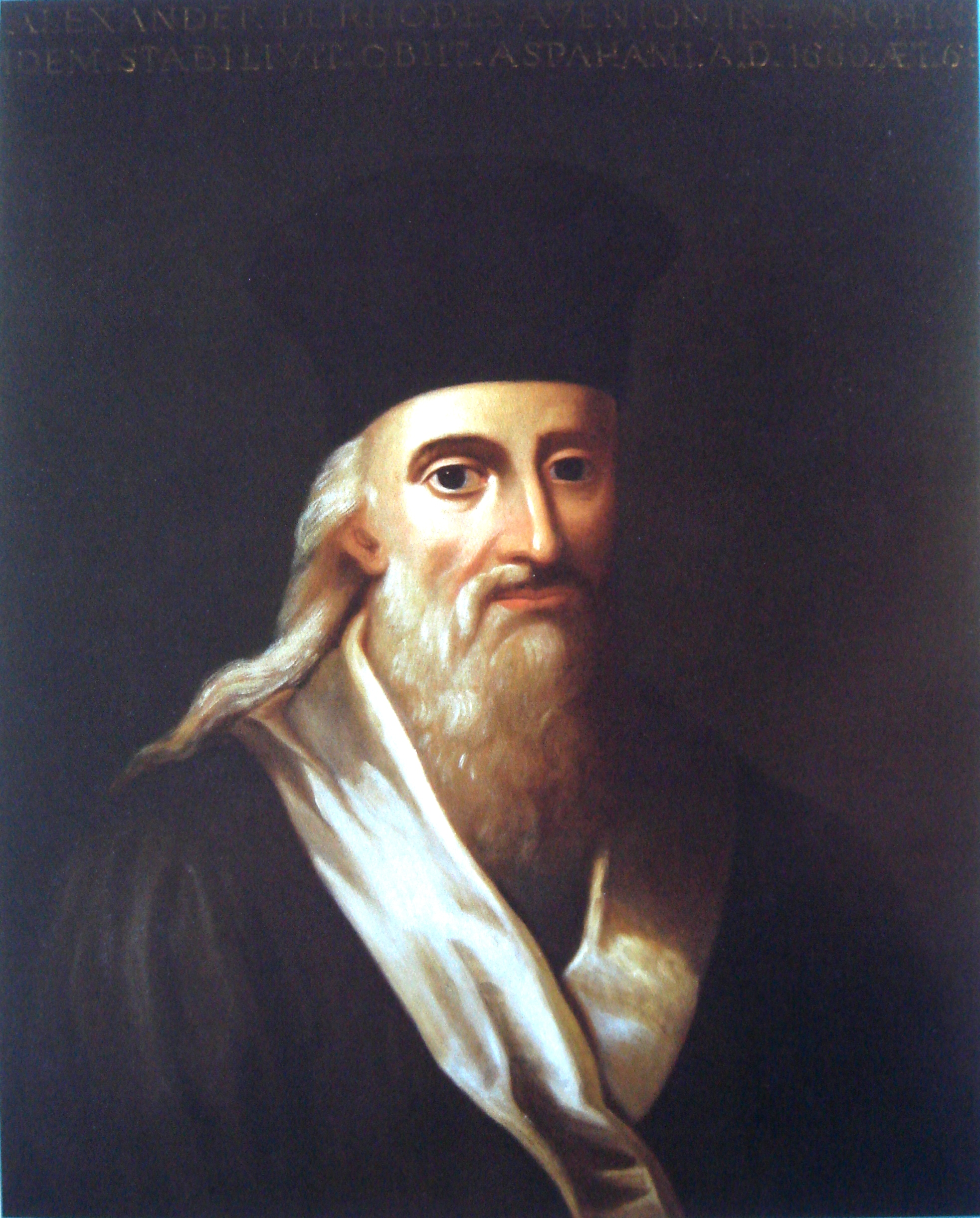
The French Jesuit Alexandre de Rhodes is at the origin of the creation of the Paris Foreign Missions Society.

The creation of the Paris Foreign Missions Society was initiated when the Jesuit priest Alexandre de Rhodes, back from Vietnam and asking for the dispatch of numerous missionaries to the Far East, obtained in 1650 an agreement by Pope Innocent X to send secular priests and bishops as missionaries. Alexandre de Rhodes received in Paris in 1653 a strong financial and organizational support from the Compagnie du Saint-Sacrement for the establishment of the Paris Foreign Missions Society. Alexander de Rhodes found secular clergy volunteers in Paris in the persons of François Pallu and Pierre Lambert de la Motte and later Ignace Cotolendi, the first members of the Paris Foreign Missions Society, who were sent to the Far-East as Apostolic vicariate.

Due to the strong opposition of Portugal and the death of Pope Innocent X the project was stalled for several years however, until the candidates to the missions decided to go by themselves to Rome in June 1657.

=== Appointment of missionary bishops ===
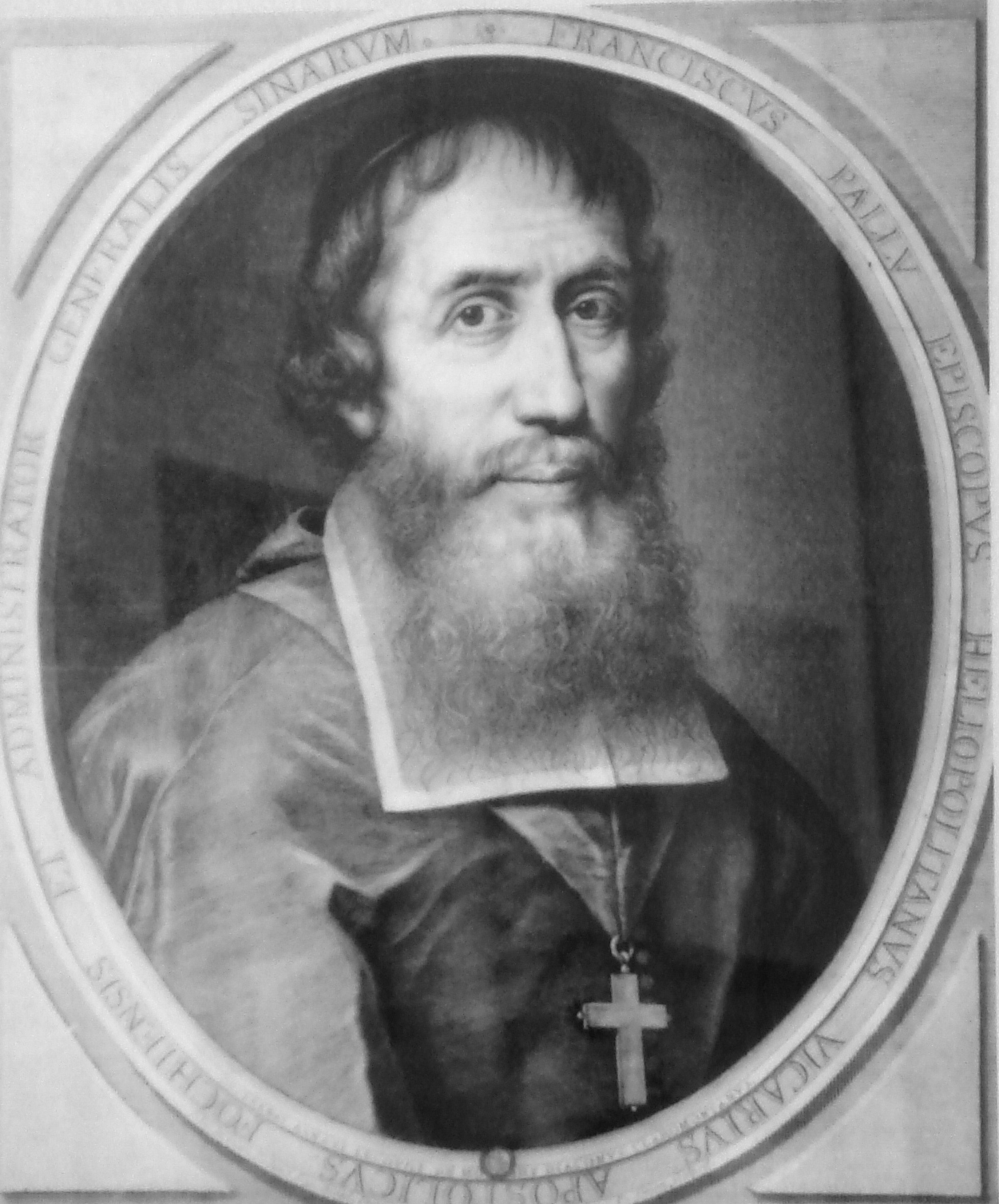
François Pallu, founding father of the Paris Foreign Missions Society

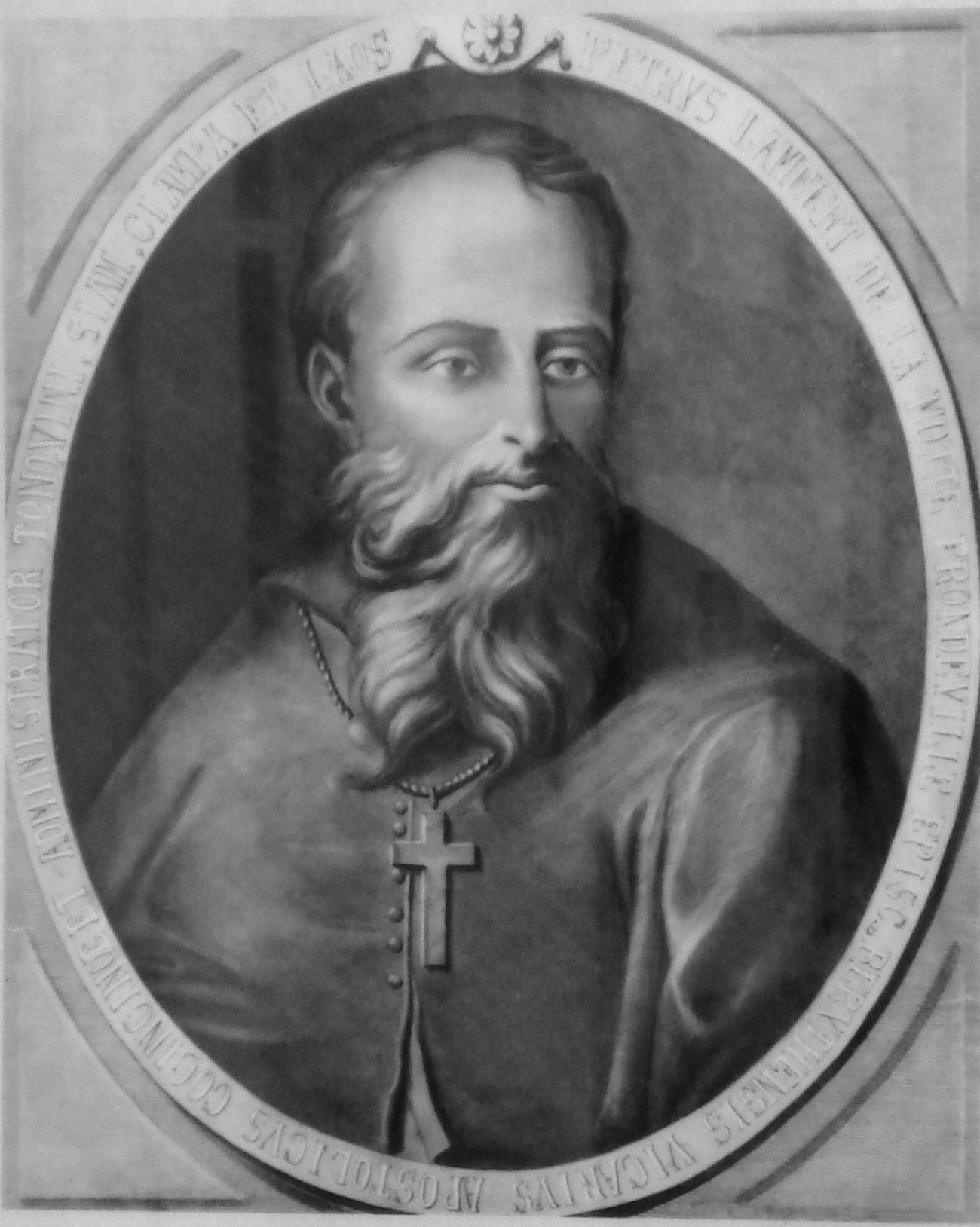
Pierre Lambert de la Motte (1624–1679)

On 29 July 1658, the two chief founders of the Paris Foreign Missions Society were appointed as bishops in the Vatican, becoming Pallu, Bishop of Heliopolis in Augustamnica, Vicar Apostolic of Tonkin, and Lambert de la Motte, Bishop of Berytus, Vicar Apostolic of Cochinchina. On 9 September 1659, the papal bull Super cathedram principis apostolorum by Pope Alexander VII defined the territories they would have to administer: for Pallu, Tonkin, Laos, and five adjacent provinces of southern China (Yunnan, Guizhou, Huguang, Sichuan, Guangxi), for Lambert de la Motte, Cochinchina and five provinces of southeastern China (Zhejiang, Fujian, Guangdong, Jiangxi, Hainan). In 1660 the third founder was appointed as Cotolendi, Bishop of Metellopolis, Vicar Apostolic of Nanjing, with also five provinces of China, namely Beijing, Shanxi, Shandong, Korea and Tartary.

All of them were nominated bishops in partibus infidelium ("In areas of the Infidels", i.e., Heliopolis, Beirut, Metellopolis etc.), receiving long-disappeared bishopric titles from areas that had been lost, in order not to compromise contemporary bishopric titles and avoid conflicts with the bishoprics established through the padroado system. In 1658 also, François de Laval was nominated Vicar Apostolic of Canada, and Bishop of Petra in partibus infidelium, becoming the first Bishop of New France, and in 1663 he would found the Séminaire de Québec with the support of the Paris Foreign Missions Society.

The society itself ("Assemblée des Missions") was formally established by the Compagnie du Saint-Sacrement in 1658. The object of the new society was and is still the evangelization of non-Christian countries, by founding churches and raising up a native clergy under the jurisdiction of the bishops. The Society was officially recognized in 1664. The creation of the Paris Foreign Missions Society coincided with the establishment of the French East India Company.

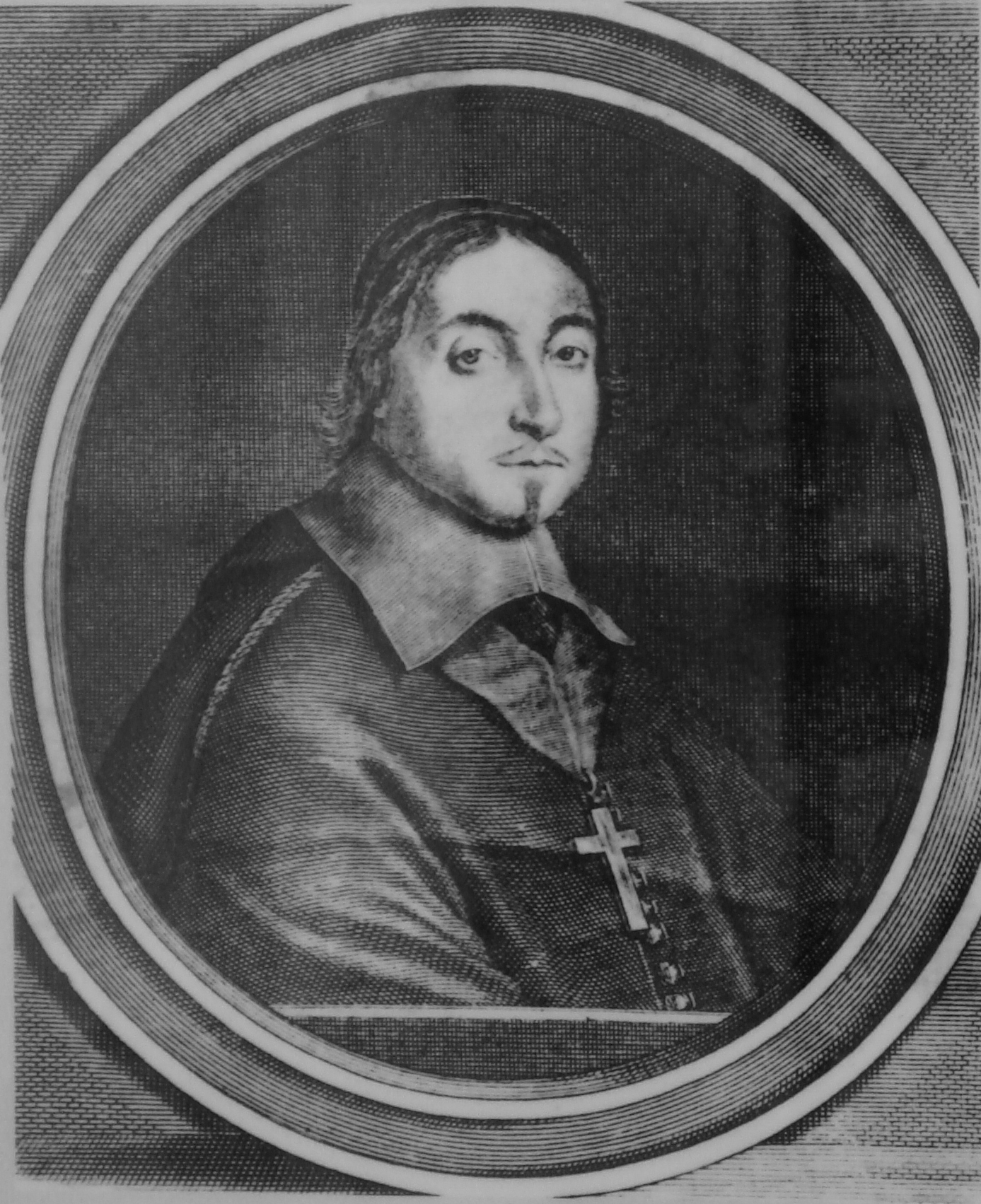
Ignace Cotolendi (1630–1662)

In order to dispatch the three missionaries to Asia, the Compagnie du Saint-Sacrement established a trading company, the Compagnie de Chine, founded in 1660. A ship, the Saint-Louis, was built in the Netherlands by the shipowner Fermanel, but the ship foundered soon after being launched. At the same time, the establishment of a trading company and the perceived threat of French missionary efforts to Asia was met with huge opposition by the Jesuits, the Portuguese, the Dutch and even the Propaganda, leading to the issuing of an interdiction of the Compagnie du Saint-Sacrement by Cardinal Mazarin in 1660. In spite of these events, the King, the Assembly of the French Clergy, the Compagnie du Saint-Sacrement and private donors accepted to finance the effort, and the three bishop managed to depart, although they now had to travel on land.

The three bishops chosen for Asia left France (1660–62) to go to their respective missions, and crossed Persia and India on foot, since Portugal would have refused to take non-Padroado missionaries by ship, and the Dutch and the English refused to take Catholic missionaries. Lambert left Marseille on 26 November 1660, and reached Mergui in Siam 18 months later, Pallu joined Lambert in the capital of Siam Ayutthaya after 24 months overland, and Cotolendi died upon arrival in India on 6 August 1662. Siam thus became the first country to receive the evangelization efforts of the Paris Foreign Missions Society, to be followed by new missions years later in Cochinchina, Tonkin and parts of China.

=== Founding principles ===
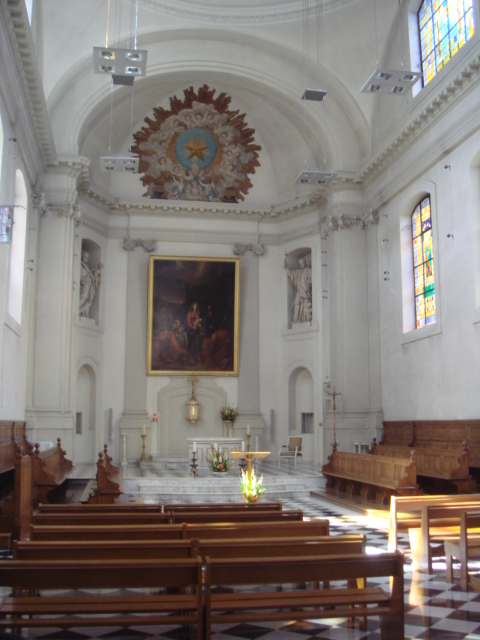
Chapel of the Paris Foreign Missions Society

The mission had the objective of adapting to local customs, establishing a native clergy, and keeping close contacts with Rome. In 1659, instructions were given by the Sacred Congregation for the Propagation of the Faith (known as the "Propaganda"):

"Here is the principal reason which determined the Sacred Congregation to send you as Bishops in these regions. It is that you endeavour, by all possible means and methods, to educate young people so as to make them capable of receiving priesthood."

— Extract from the 1659 Instructions, given to Pallu and Lambert de la Motte by the Sacred Congregation for the Propagation of the Faith.

Instructions were also given to the effect that respecting the habits of the countries to be evangelized was paramount, a guiding principle of the missions ever since:

"Do not act with zeal, do not put forward any arguments to convince these peoples to change their rites, their customs or their usages, except if they are evidently contrary to the religion and morality. What would be more absurd than to bring France, Spain, Italy or any other European country to the Chinese? Do not bring to them our countries, but instead bring to them the faith, a faith that does not reject or hurt the rites, nor the usages of any people, provided that these are not distasteful, but that instead keeps and protects them."

— Extract from the 1659 Instructions, given to Pallu and Lambert de la Motte by the Sacred Congregation for the Propagation of the Faith.

=== Establishment on Rue du Bac, Paris ===
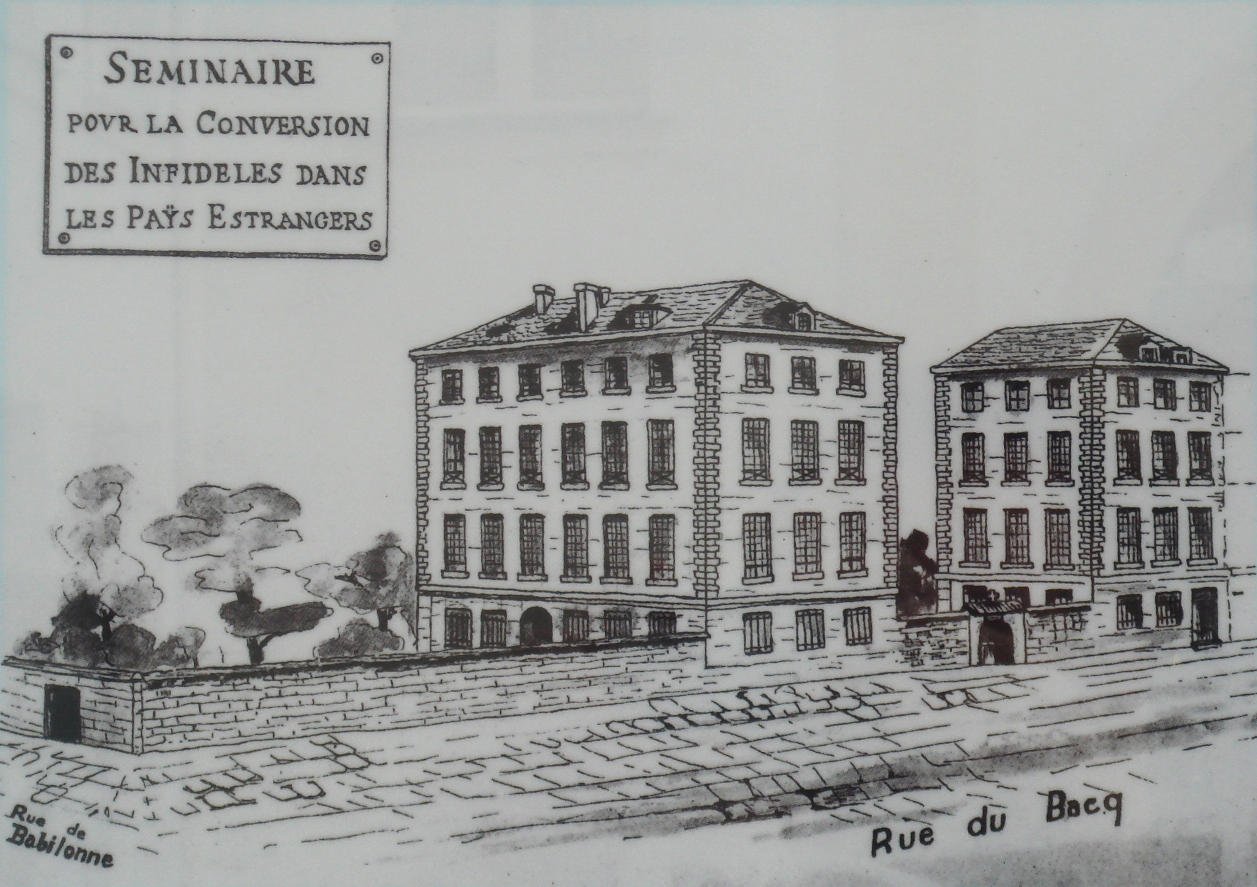
The Paris Foreign Missions Society in 1663

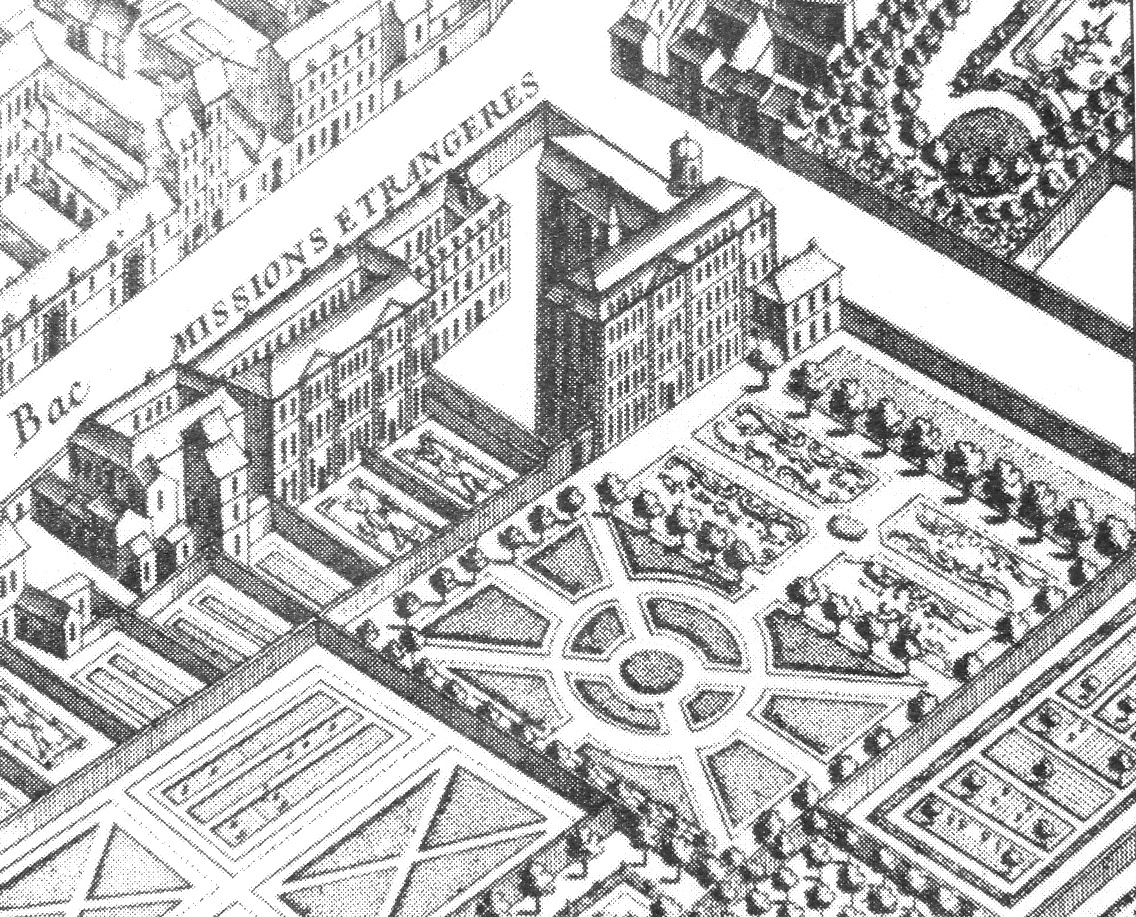
The Paris Foreign Missions Society in 1739, with its park (detail of 1739 map of Paris by Turgot)

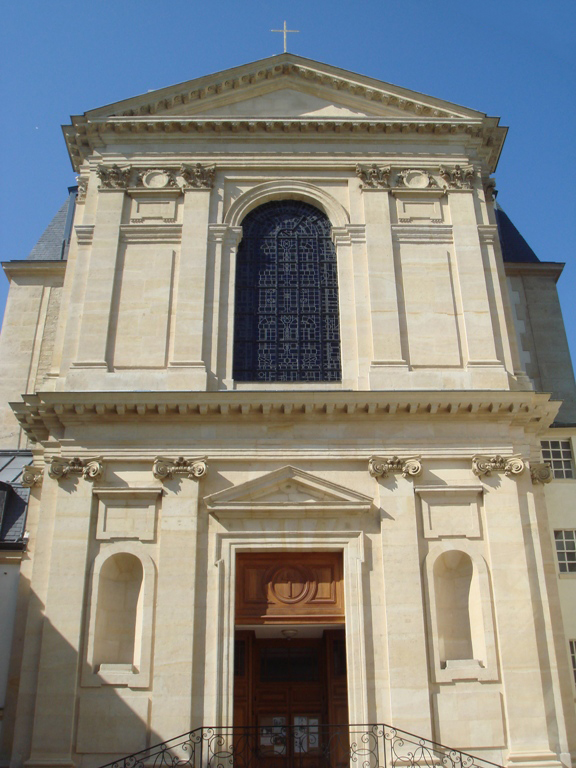
The Chapel at the Paris Foreign Missions Society, established in 1691

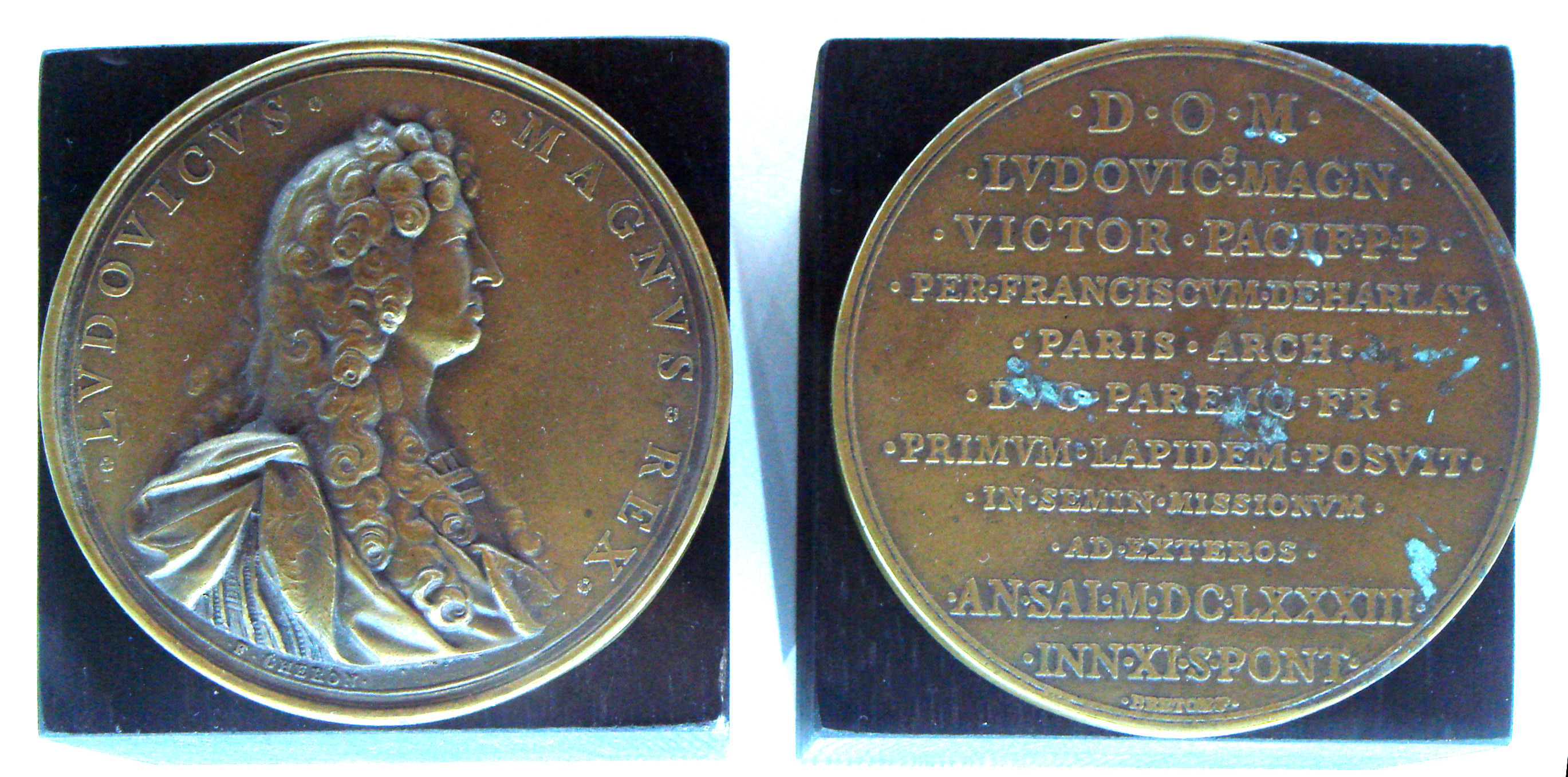
Louis XIV commemorative medal of the first stone of the Mission, 1683

The seminary (Séminaire des Missions Étrangères) was created in March 1663. Jean Duval, ordained under the name Bernard de Sainte Thérèse and nominated Bishop of Babylon (modern Iraq) in 1638, offered the deserted buildings of his own Seminary for Missions to Persia, which he had created in 1644 at 128 Rue du Bac. On 10 March 1664, Vincent de Meur was nominated as the first director of the seminary, and officially became superior of the seminary on 11 June 1664.

The seminary was established so that the society might recruit members and administer its property, through the actions of the Compagnie du Saint-Sacrement and by the priests whom the vicars Apostolic had appointed their agents. This house, whose directors were to form young priests to the apostolic life and transmit to the bishops the offerings made by charity, was, and still is situated in Paris in the Rue du Bac.

Known from the beginning as the Seminary of Foreign Missions, it secured the approval of Pope Alexander VII, and the legal recognition of the French government and Louis XIV in 1663. In 1691 the chapel was established, and in 1732 the new, larger, building was completed.

Another wing, perpendicular to the 1732 one, was added in the 19th century to accommodate the great increase in members of the seminary.

== 1658–1800 ==
The chief events of this period were: the publication of the book Institutions apostoliques, which contains the germ of the principles of the rule, the foundation of the general seminary in Ayutthaya, Siam (the Seminary of Saint Joseph, at the origin of the College General now in Penang, Malaysia), the evangelization of Tonkin, Cochinchina, Cambodia, and Siam, where more than 40,000 Christians were baptized, the creation of an institute of Vietnamese nuns known as "Lovers of the Cross", the establishment of rules among catechists, and the ordination of thirty native priests. Between 1660 and 1700 about 100 missionaries were sent to Asia.

=== Siam ===
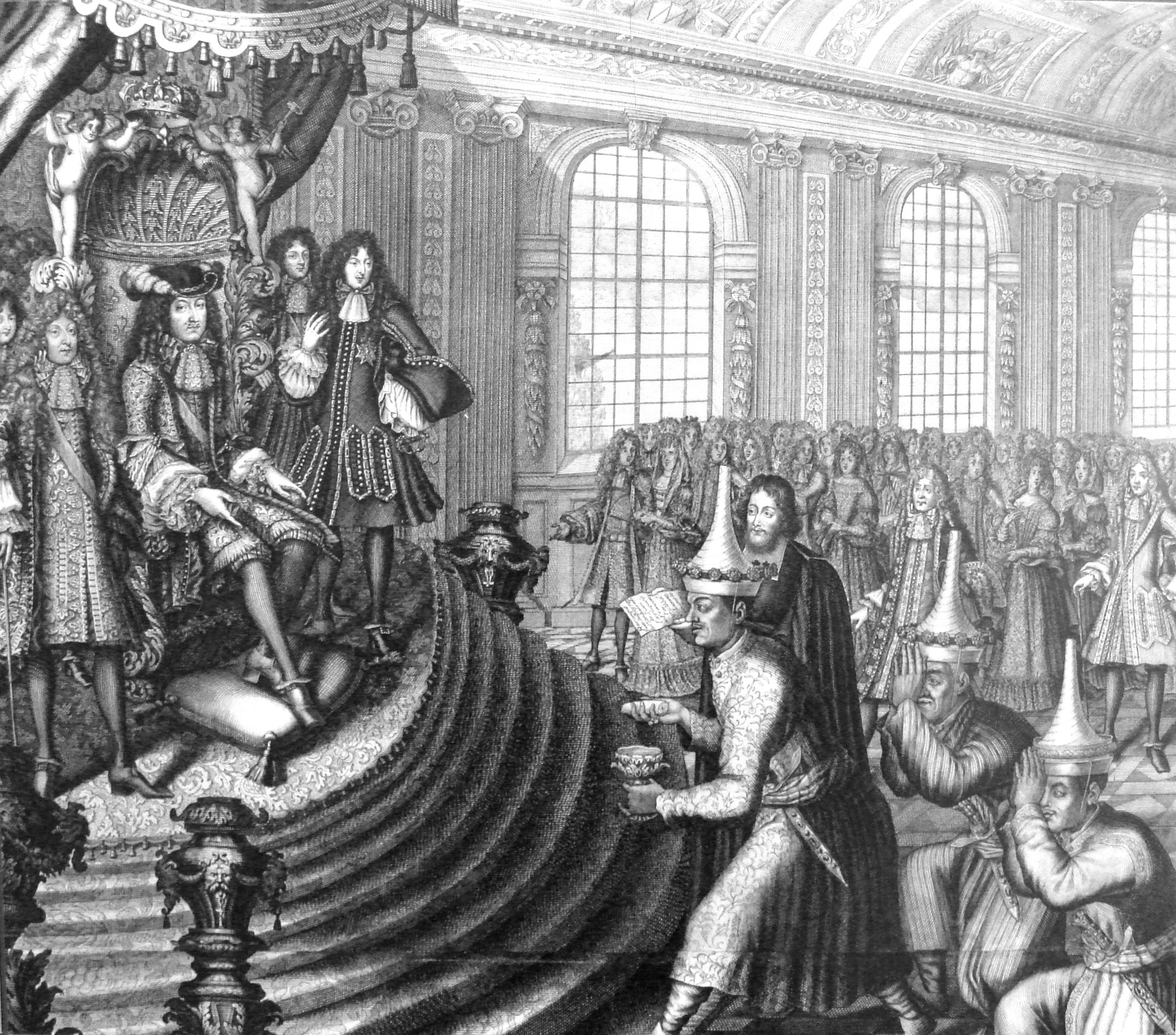
The Siamese embassy to Louis XIV, led by Kosa Pan in 1686, was a result of the missionary efforts of the Paris Foreign Missions Society.

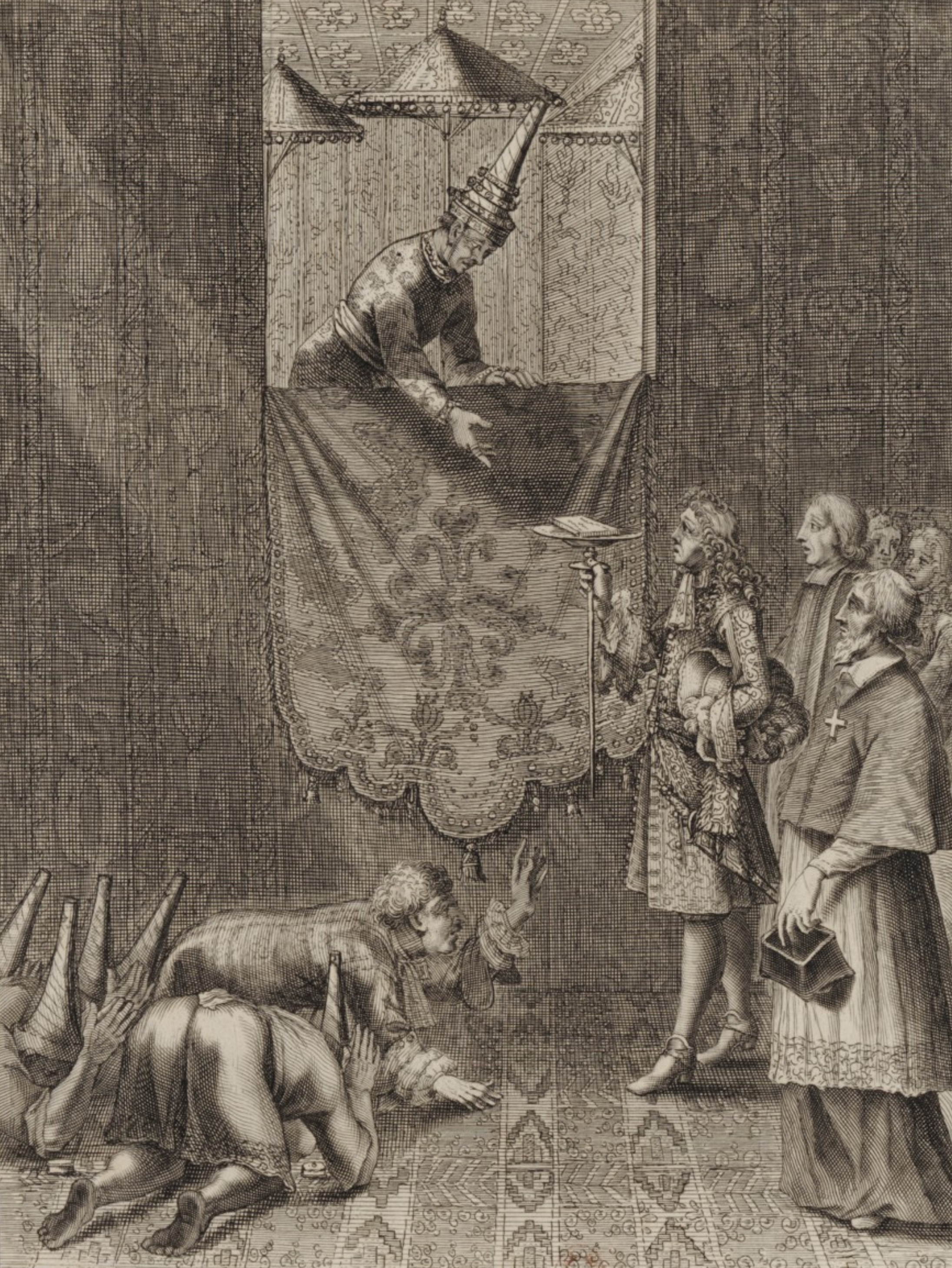
Louis Laneau of the Paris Foreign Missions Society (on the right, forefront) was closely involved in the contacts with the Siamese king Narai. Here, the French ambassador Chevalier de Chaumont presents a letter from Louis XIV to King Narai in 1685.

The Paris Foreign Missions Society started its work in Siam, with the establishment of a base in its capital Ayutthaya. Siam was known to be highly tolerant of other religions and was the only country in Southeast Asia where the Catholic fathers could establish a base safely. With the agreement of the Siamese king Narai, the Seminary of Saint Joseph was established, which could educate Asian candidate priests from all the countries of the Southeast Asian peninsula. A cathedral was also constructed. The college remained in Siam for a century, until the conquest of Siam by Burma in 1766.

The missionary work also had political effects: through their initiative a more active trade was established among Indo-China, the Indies, and France; embassies were sent from place to place; and treaties were signed. In 1681, Jacques-Charles de Brisacier was elected superior of the organization. In 1681 or 1682, the Siamese king Narai, who was seeking to reduce Dutch and English influence, named the French medical missionary Brother René Charbonneau, a member of the Siam mission, as Governor of Phuket . Charbonneau held the position of Governor until 1685. In 1687 a French expedition to Siam took possession of Bangkok, Mergui, and Jonselang. France came close to ruling an Indo-Chinese empire, though it failed following the 1688 Siamese revolution, which adversely affected the missions. Louis Laneau of the society was involved in these events. He was imprisoned by the government for two years, with half of the members of the Seminar, until he was allowed to resume his activities.

In 1702, Artus de Lionne, Bishop of Rosalie, and missionary of the Paris Foreign Missions Society, brought Arcadio Huang to France as one of the first Chinese men there. He established the basis for the study of the Chinese language in France.

In the second half of the 18th century, the society was charged with the missions which the Jesuits had possessed in India prior to suppression of the order in Portugal. Many of the Jesuits remained in Asia. The missions took on a new life, especially in Sichuan (see Catholic Church in Sichuan), under bishops Pottier and Dufresse, and in Cochinchina.

=== Cochinchina ===
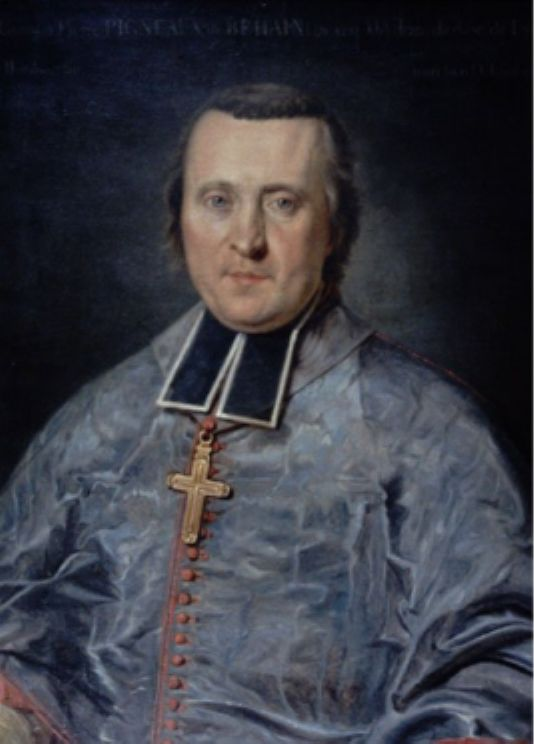
Pigneau de Behaine acted as a diplomatic agent for the Vietnamese Prince Nguyễn Phúc Ánh (the future Gia Long).

In Cochinchina, Pigneau de Behaine acted as an agent for Nguyễn Phúc Ánh, a pretender to the throne, in making a treaty with France (the 1787 Treaty of Versailles). Pigneau de Behaine assisted Nguyễn Phúc Ánh in obtaining the support of several French soldiers and officers, modernizing his army, and ultimately gaining victory over the Tây Sơn.

=== French revolution ===
At the end of the 18th century, the French Revolution halted the growth of the society, which had previously been very rapid. At that time it had six bishops, a score of missionaries, assisted by 135 native priests; in the various missions there were nine seminaries with 250 students, and 300,000 Christians. Each year the number of baptisms rose on an average of 3000 to 3500; that of infant baptisms in articulo mortis was more than 100,000.

== 19th century ==
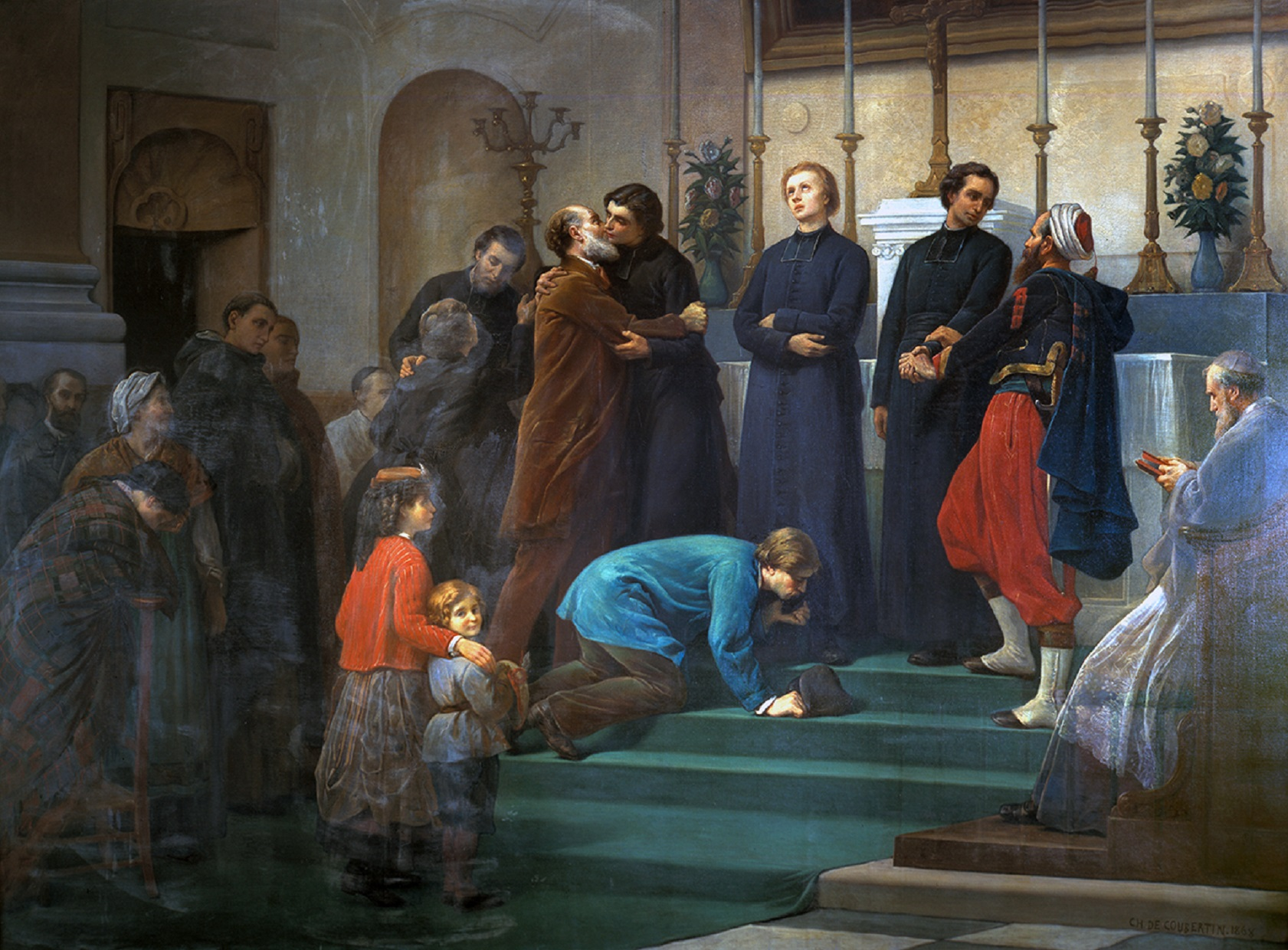
Departure ceremony at the Paris Foreign Missions Society. Le Départ, 1868, by Charles Louis de Fredy de Coubertin

On 23 March 1805, Napoleon signed a decree reinstating the Paris Foreign Missions Society. In 1809 however, following a conflict with the Pope, Napoleon cancelled his decision. The Missions would be firmly re-established through a decree by Louis XVIII in March 1815.

Several causes contributed to the rapid growth of the society in the 19th century; chiefly the charity of the Propagation of the Faith and the Society of the Holy Childhood. Each bishop received annually 1200 francs, each mission had its general needs and works allowance, which varied according to its importance, and could amount to from 10,000 to 30,000 francs.

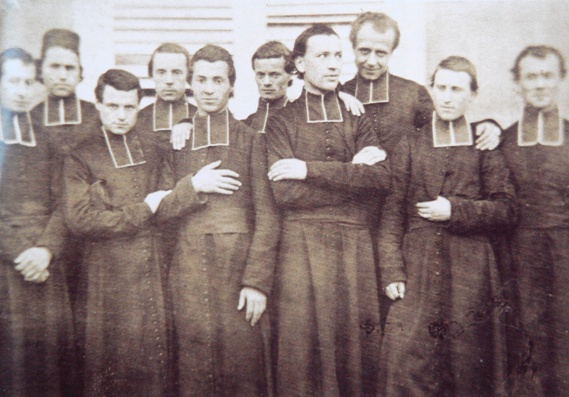
1856 departures of MEP missionaries

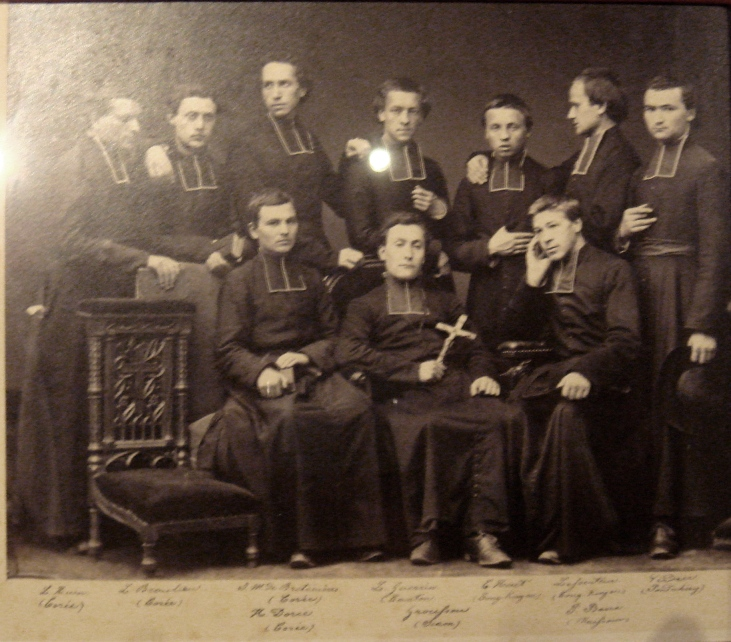
1864 departures of MEP missionaries. The four on the left would become martyrs in Korea.

The second cause was persecution. Fifteen missionaries died in prison or were beheaded during the 17th and 18th centuries and the beginning of the 19th century; but after that those killed among the missionaries were very numerous. (See Martyr Saints of China). Altogether, about 200 MEP missionaries died of violent death. Among them 23 were beatified, of whom 20 were canonized, with an additional 3 in 2000.

Authors such as Chateaubriand, with his Génie du christianisme, also contributed to the recovery of the militant spirit of Catholicism, after the troubles of the French Revolution.

By 1820, the territory of the Missions, which included India since the prohition of the Company of Jesus (the Jesuits) in 1776, extended to Korea, Japan, Manchuria, Tibet, Burma, Malaysia etc.

In the 19th century, the local persecutions of missionary priests of the Paris Foreign Missions Society was often a pretext for French military intervention in Asia, based on the doctrine of the Protectorate of missions. These persecutions were described in Europe by books, pamphlets, annals, and journals, inspiring numerous young men either with the desire for martyrdom or that of evangelization. They played a part in inspiring European nations, especially France and England, to intervene in Indochina and China. However, in late nineteenth century Indochina, missionaries from the Foreign Missions Society often were at odds the staunchly secular French state, which questioned their commitment to the colonial cause.

Another cause of the progress of the missionaries was the ease and frequency of communication in consequence of the invention of steam and the opening of the Suez Canal. A voyage could be made safely in one month which formerly required eight to ten months amid many dangers. In Vietnam, the persecutions of numerous priests such as Pierre Borie or Augustin Schoeffer was used as a justification for the armed interventions of Jean-Baptiste Cécille and Charles Rigault de Genouilly, ultimately leading to the occupation of Vietnam and the creation of French Indochina. In Korea, the beheading of Siméon-François Berneux and other priests justified the 1866 French Campaign against Korea.

=== Vietnam ===
Martyrdom of Joseph Marchand in Vietnam in 1835

In 1825, emperor Minh Mạng, the son and successor of Gia Long, prohibited foreign missionaries in Vietnam, on the grounds that they perverted the people. The prohibition proved largely ineffective, as missionaries continued their activities in Vietnam, and participated in armed rebellions against Minh Mạng, as in the Lê Văn Khôi revolt (1833–1835). He banned Catholicism completely, as well as French and Vietnamese priests (1833–1836), leading to persecutions of French missionaries. These included the martyrdom of Joseph Marchand in 1835 or Pierre Borie in 1838. These events served in France to stoke a desire among young men to intervene and protect the Catholic faith.

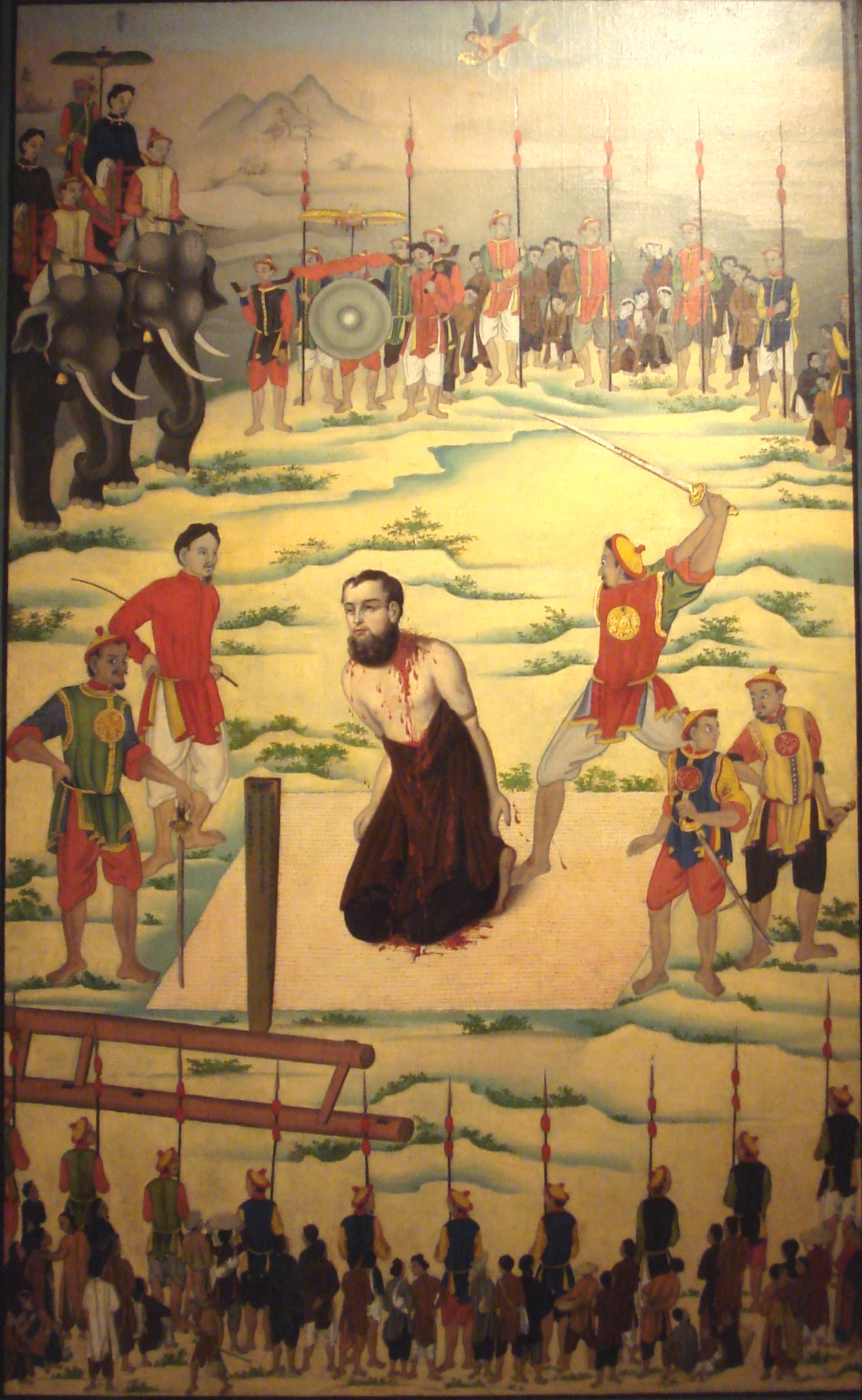
Martyrdom of Pierre Borie, 24 November 1838, in Tonkin, Vietnam; Vietnamese painting

Ming Man's successor, Thiệu Trị, upheld the anti-Catholic policy of his predecessor. In 1843, the French Foreign Minister François Guizot sent a fleet to Vietnam under Admiral Jean-Baptiste Cécille and Captain Charner,. The action also was related to the British successes in China in 1842, and France hoped to be able to establish trade with China from the south. The pretext was to support British efforts in China, and to fight the persecution of French missionaries in Vietnam.

In 1847, Cécille sent two warships (Gloire and Victorieuse) under Captain Lapierre to Da Nang (Tourane) in Vietnam to obtain the release of two imprisoned French missionaries, Bishop Dominique Lefèbvre (imprisoned for a second time as he had re-entered Vietnam illegally) and Duclos, and freedom of worship for Catholics in Vietnam. As negotiations drew on without results, on 15 April 1847, a fight named the Bombardment of Đà Nẵng erupted between the French fleet and Vietnamese ships, three of which were sunk as a result. The French fleet sailed away.

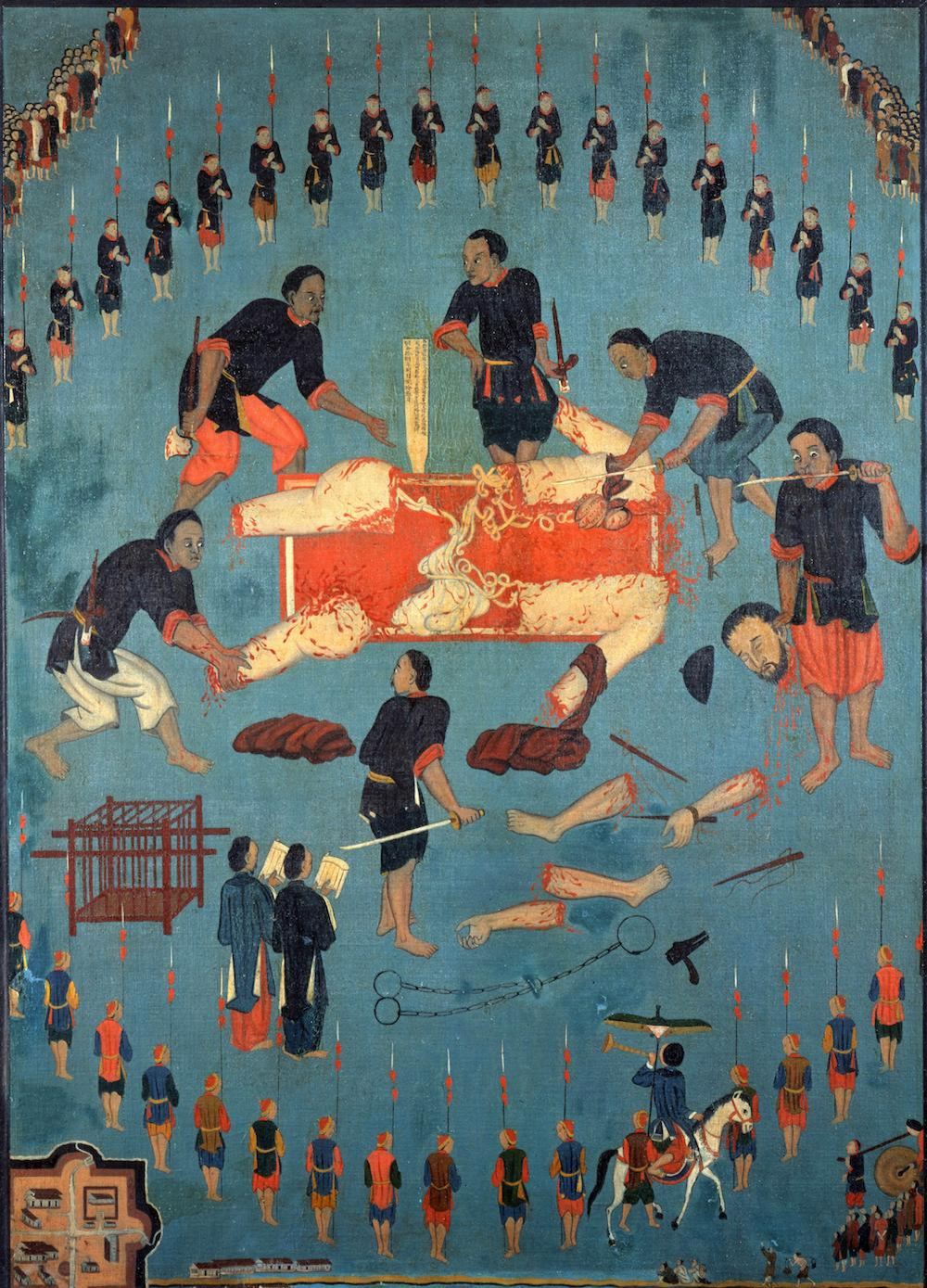
Martyrdom of Jean-Charles Cornay, 1837

Other missionaries were martyred during the reign of Emperor Tự Đức, such as Augustin Schoeffer in 1851 and Jean Louis Bonnard in 1852, prompting the Paris Foreign Missions Society to ask the French government for a diplomatic intervention. In 1858, Charles Rigault de Genouilly attacked Vietnam under the orders of Napoleon III following the failed mission of diplomat Charles de Montigny. His stated mission was to stop the persecution of Catholic missionaries in the country and assure the unimpeded propagation of the faith. Rigault de Genouilly, with 14 French gunships, 3,000 men and 300 Filipino troops provided by the Spanish, attacked the port of Da Nang in 1858, causing significant damage, and occupying the city. After a few months, Rigault had to leave due to problems with supplies and illnesses among many of his troops. Sailing south, De Genouilly captured Saigon, a poorly defended city, on 18 February 1859. This was the beginning of the French conquest of Cochinchina.

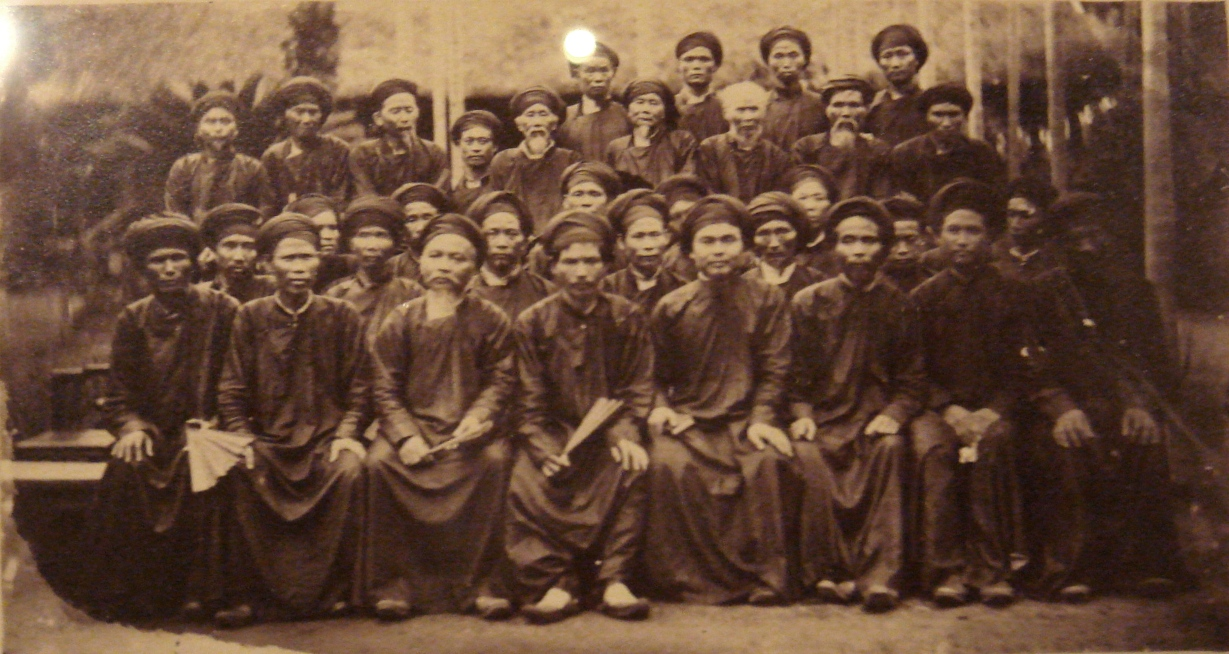
Native priests of the Paris Foreign Missions Society, in western Tonkin

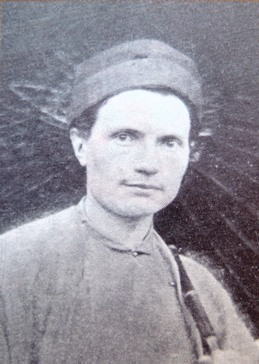
Jules Paspin, of the MEP. Died of malnutrition in Vietnam in 1856.

=== Korea ===
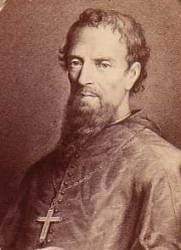
Laurent-Joseph-Marius Imbert of the Paris Foreign Missions Society, Saint, martyred in Korea (21 September 1839)

In the mid-19th century that the first western Catholic missionaries began to enter Korea. This was done by stealth, either via the Korean border with Manchuria or the Yellow Sea. These French missionaries of the Paris Foreign Missions Society arrived in Korea in the 1840s to proselytize to a growing Korean flock that had in fact independently introduced Catholicism into Korea but needed ordained ministers.

==== 1839 persecutions ====
On 26 April 1836, Laurent-Joseph-Marius Imbert of the Paris Foreign Missions Society was appointed Vicar Apostolic of Korea and Titular Bishop of Capsa. On 14 May 1837, he was ordained Titular Bishop of Capsa and crossed secretly from Manchuria to Korea the same year. On 10 August 1839, Bishop Imbert, who was secretly going about his missionary work, was betrayed. He was taken to Seoul where he was tortured to reveal the whereabouts of foreign missionaries. He wrote a note to his fellow missionaries, Pierre-Philibert Maubant and Jacques-Honoré Chastan, asking them to surrender to the Korean authorities as well. They were taken before an interrogator and questioned for three days to reveal the names and whereabouts of their converts. As torture failed to break them down, they were sent to another prison and beheaded on 21 September 1839 at Saenamteo. Their bodies remained exposed for several days but were finally buried on Noku Mountain.

==== 1866 persecutions ====
Bishop Siméon-François Berneux, appointed in 1856 as head of the infant Korean Catholic church, estimated in 1859 that the number of Korean faithful had reached nearly 17,000. At first the Korean court turned a blind eye to such incursions. This attitude changed abruptly, however, with the enthronement of King Gojong in 1864. By the time the Heungseon Daewongun assumed de facto control of the government in 1864 there were twelve French Paris Foreign Missions Society priests living and preaching in Korea and an estimated 23,000 native Korean converts.

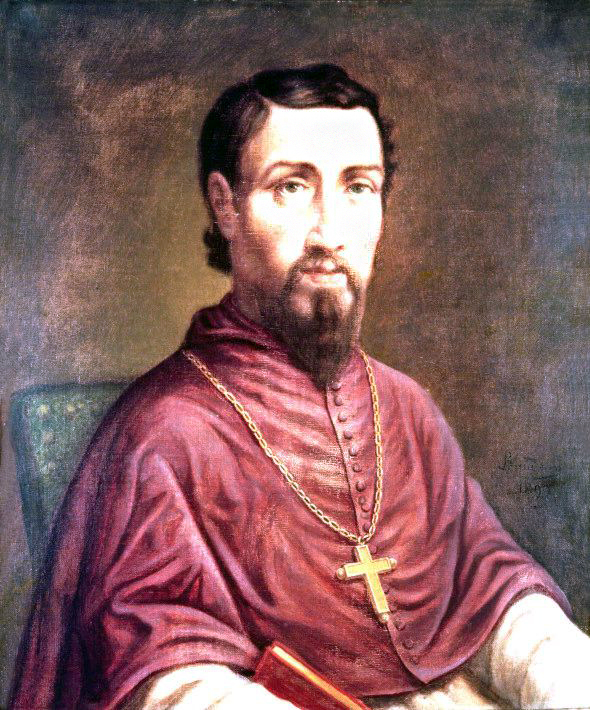
Bishop Berneux of the Paris Foreign Missions Society was tortured and then beheaded on 7 March 1866.

In January 1866 Russian ships appeared on the east coast of Korea demanding trading and residency rights in what seemed an echo of the demands made on China by other western powers. Native Korean Christians, with connections at court, saw in this an opportunity to advance their cause and suggested an alliance between France and Korea to repel the Russian advances, suggesting further that this alliance could be negotiated through Bishop Berneux. The Heungseon Daewongun seemed open to this idea, though it is uncertain whether this was ruse to bring the head of the Korean Catholic Church out into the open. Berneux was summoned to the capital, but upon his arrival in February 1866, he was seized and executed. A roundup then began of the other French Catholic priests and native converts.

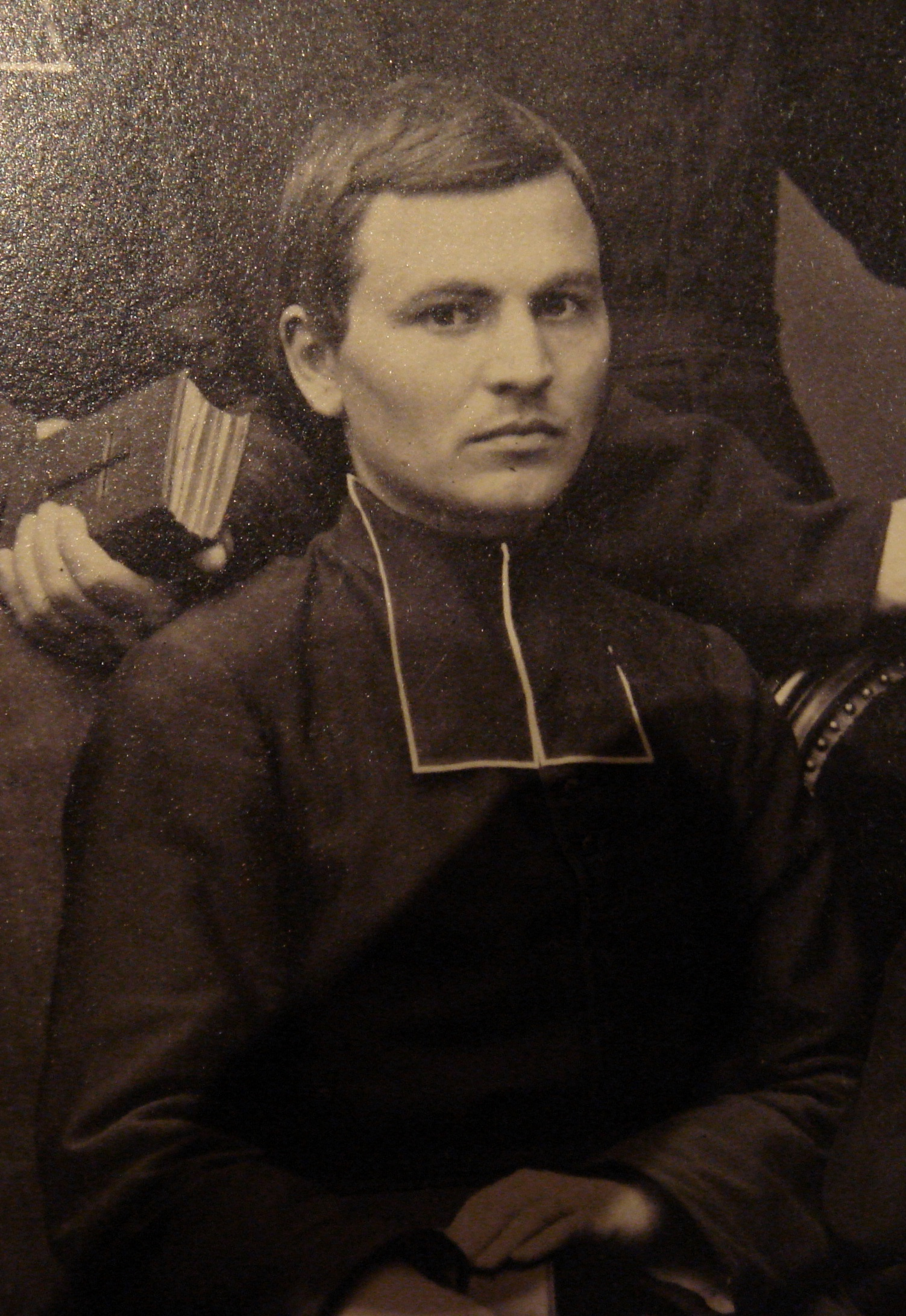
Pierre Henri Dorié of the Paris Foreign Missions Society, also martyred in Korea in 1866

As a result of the Korean dragnet all but three of the French missionaries were captured and executed: among them were Siméon Berneux, Antoine Daveluy, Just de Bretenières, Louis Beaulieu, Pierre Henri Dorié, Pierre Aumaître, Luc Martin Huin, all of them members of the Paris Foreign Missions Society and canonized by Pope John Paul II on 6 May 1984. An untold number of Korean Catholics also met their end (estimations run around 10,000), many being executed a place called Jeoldu-san in Seoul on the banks of the Han River. In late June 1866 one of the three surviving French missionaries, Felix-Claire Ridel, managed to escape via a fishing vessel and make his way to Tianjin, China, in early July 1866. Fortuitously in Tianjin at the time of Ridel's arrival was the commander of the French Far Eastern Squadron, Rear Admiral Pierre-Gustave Roze. Hearing of the massacre and the affront to French national honor, Roze determined to launch a punitive expedition, the French Campaign against Korea, 1866.

=== China ===
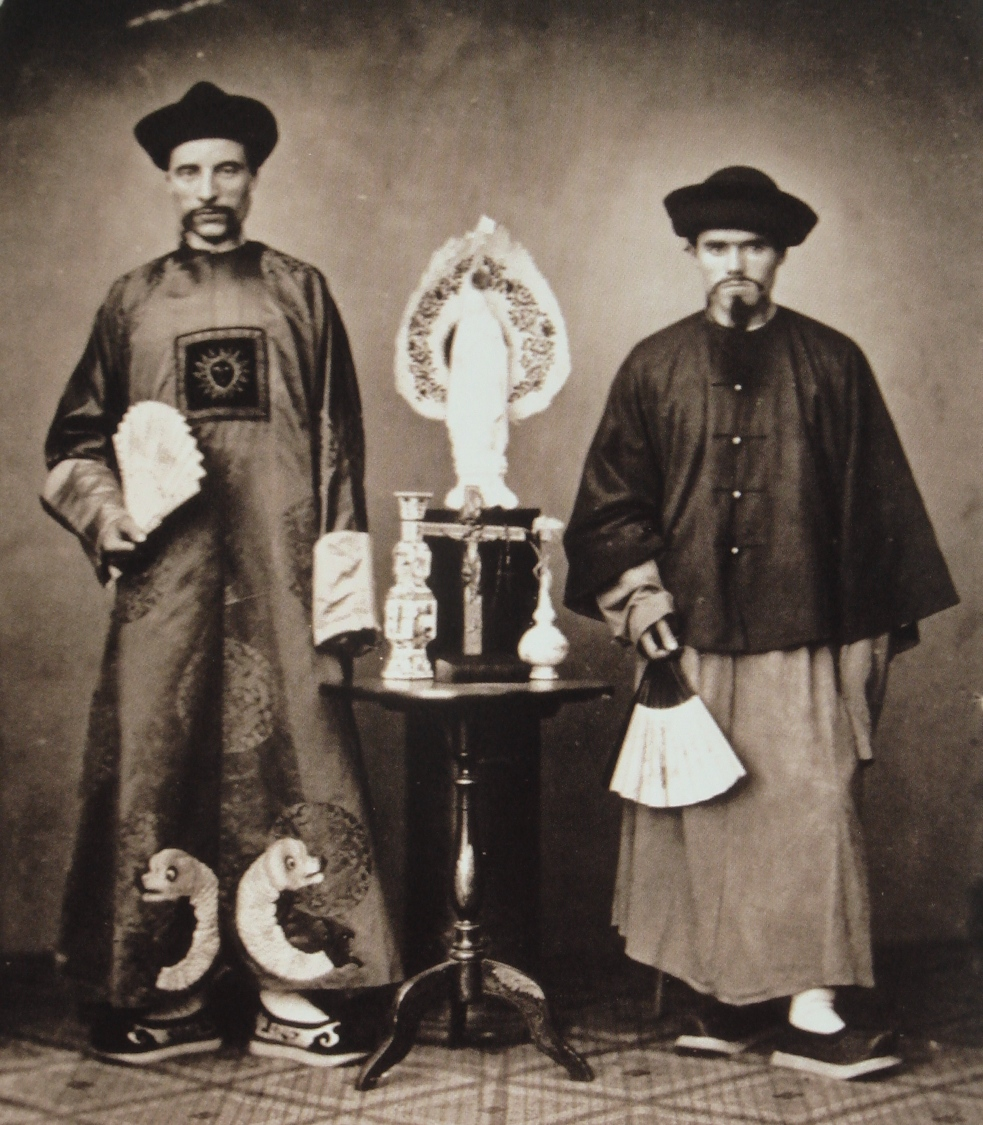
Paris Foreign Missions Society priests in Guangdong and Guangxi in 1860: Étienne Alibert (1835–1868) and Louis Jolly (1836–1878)

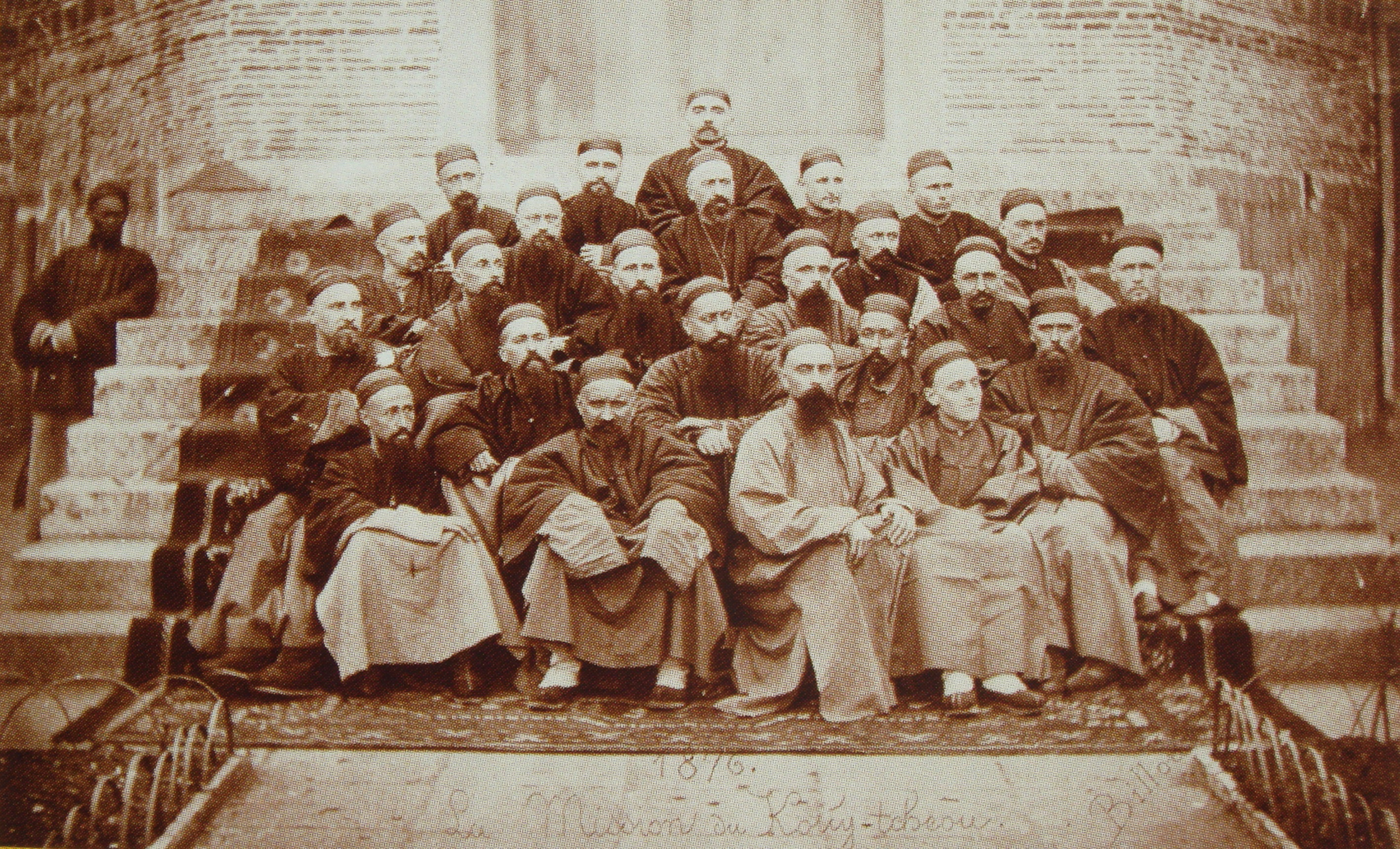
The mission in the Chinese province of Guizhou, 1876

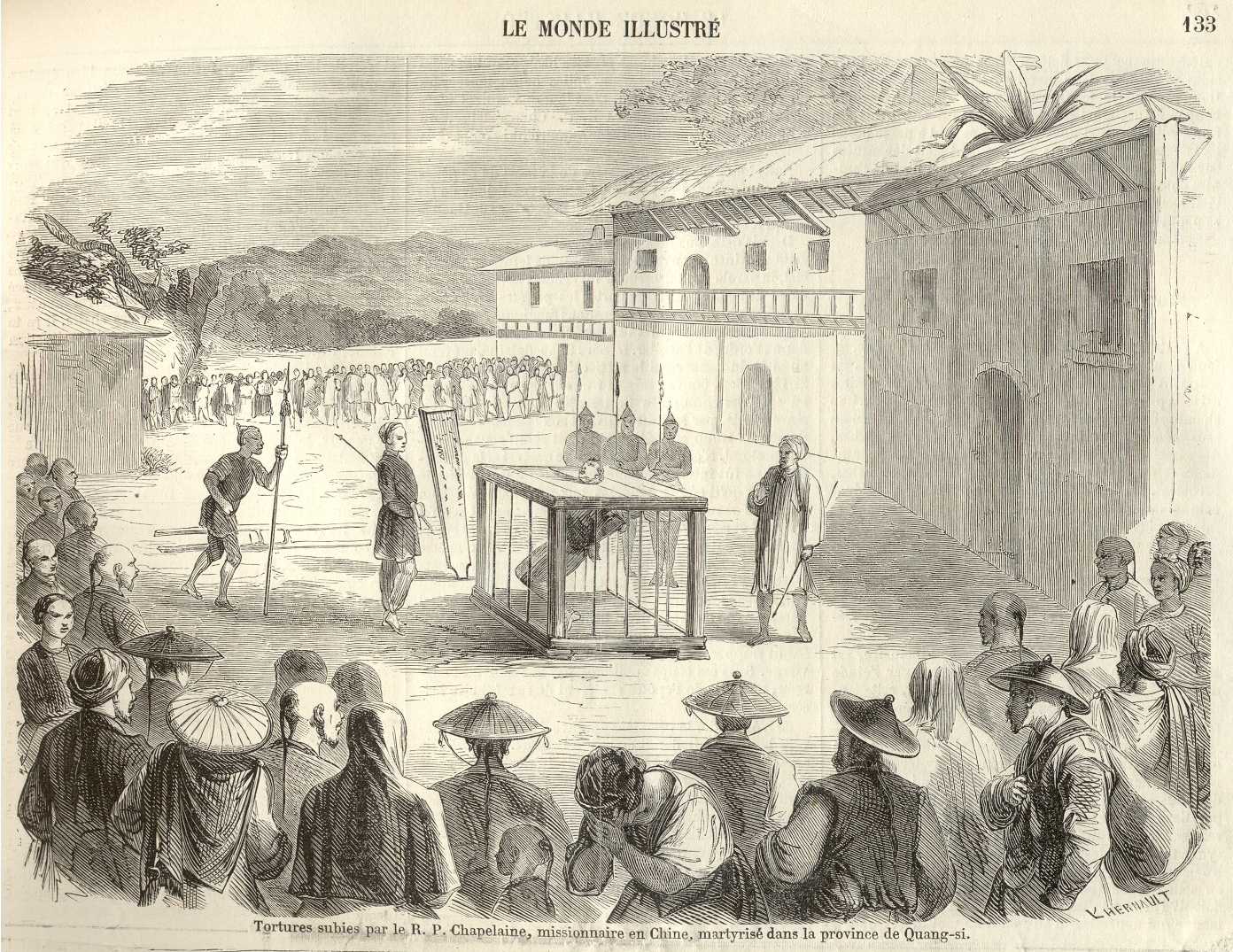
Martyrdom of Auguste Chapdelaine in 1856

Auguste Chapdelaine, who was preaching illegally in China, was imprisoned, tortured and killed by Chinese authorities in 1856. This event, named the "Father Chapdelaine Incident" became the pretext for the French military intervention in the Second Opium War.

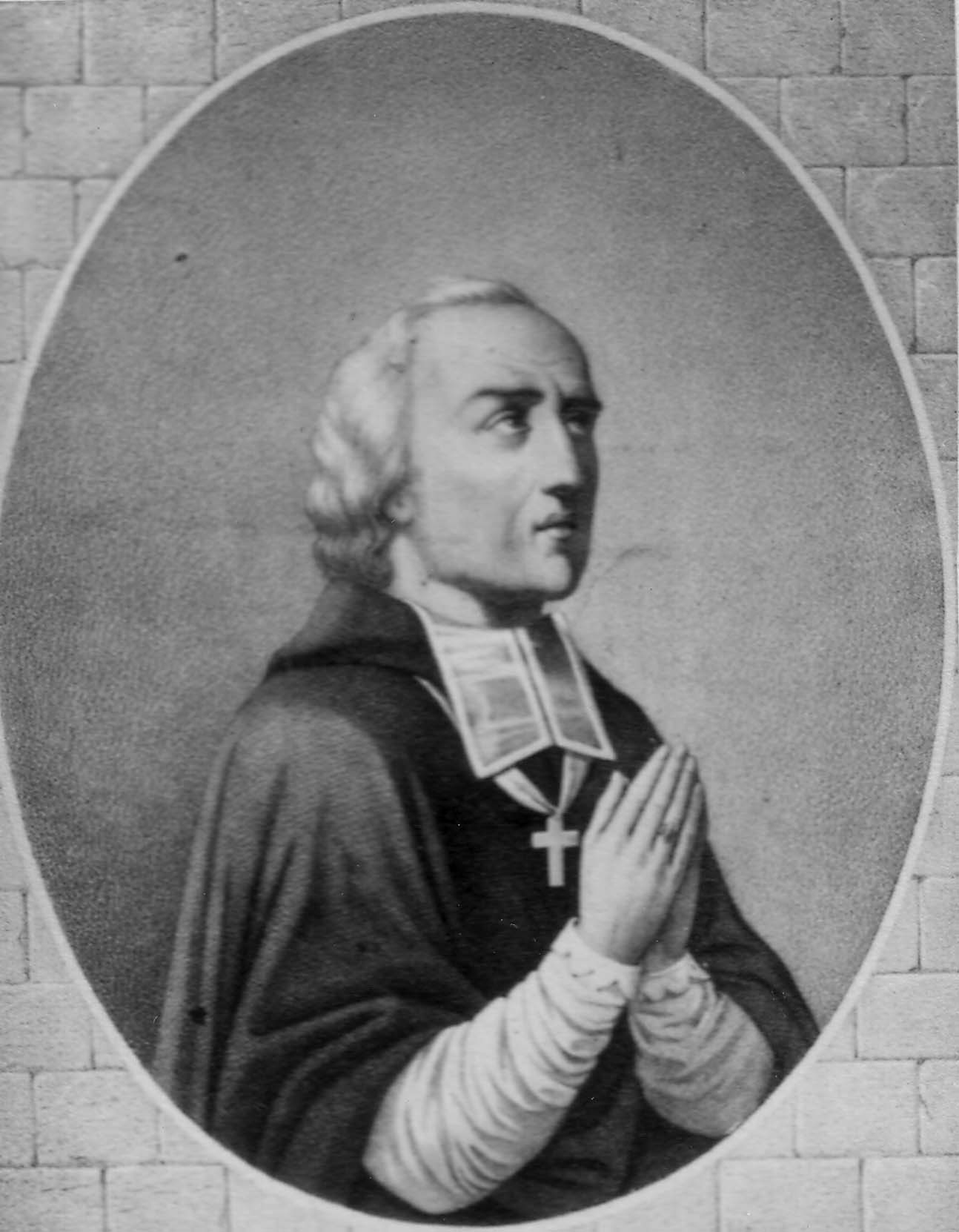
Gabriel-Taurin Dufresse, martyred in Chengdu in 1815

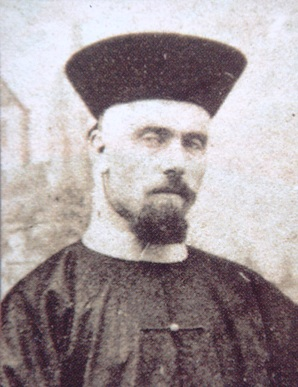
Pierre Dumont, died fleeing a Muslim revolt in Yunnan in 1856

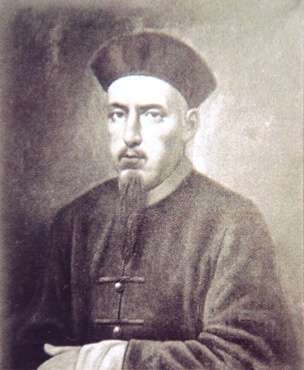
Auguste Chapdelaine, martyred in Guangxi in 1856

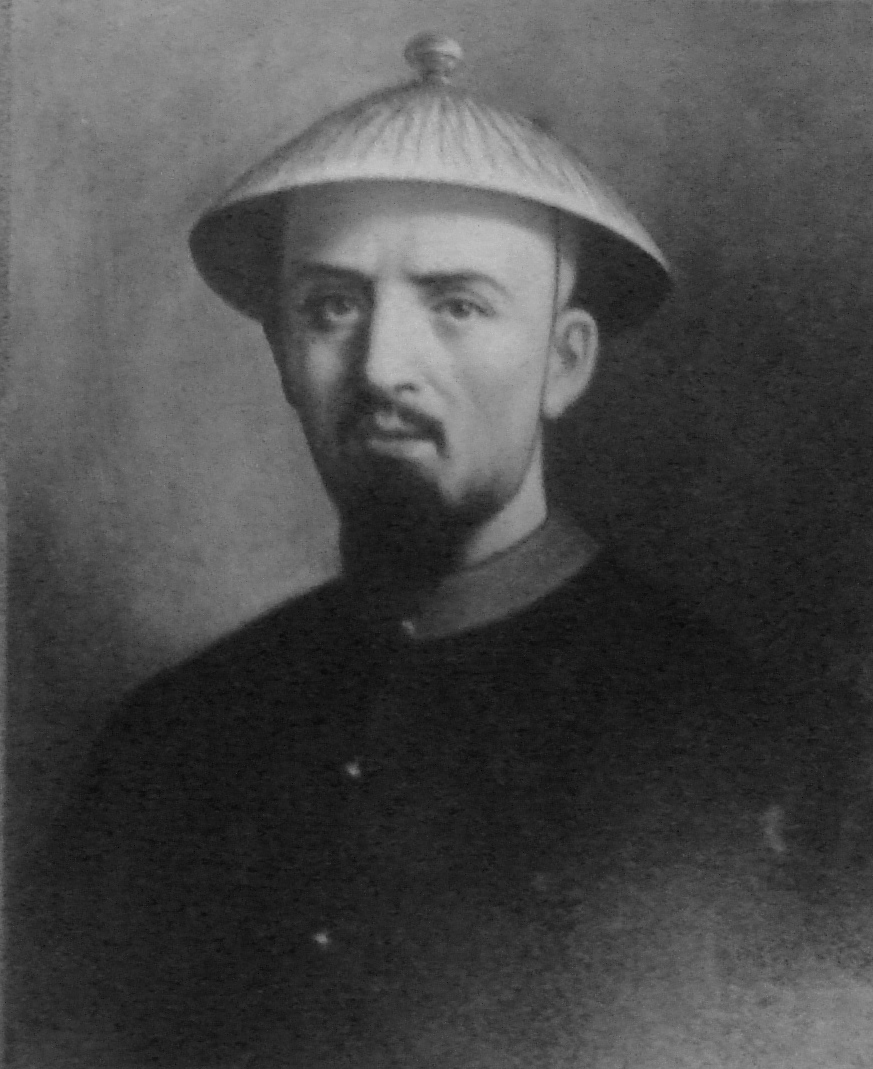
Jean-Pierre Néel, martyred in Guizhou in 1862

Mission areas

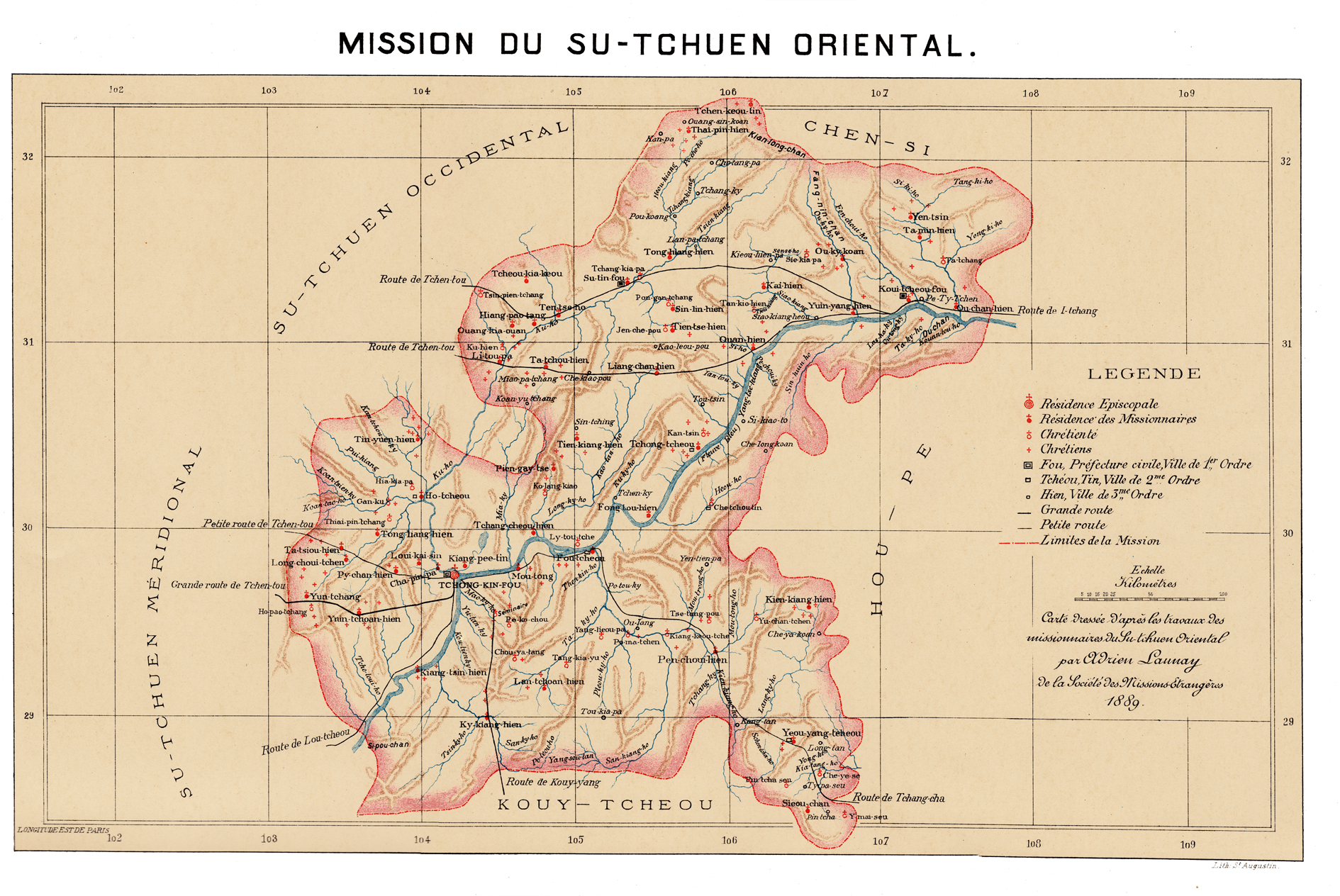
Eastern Szechwan Mission

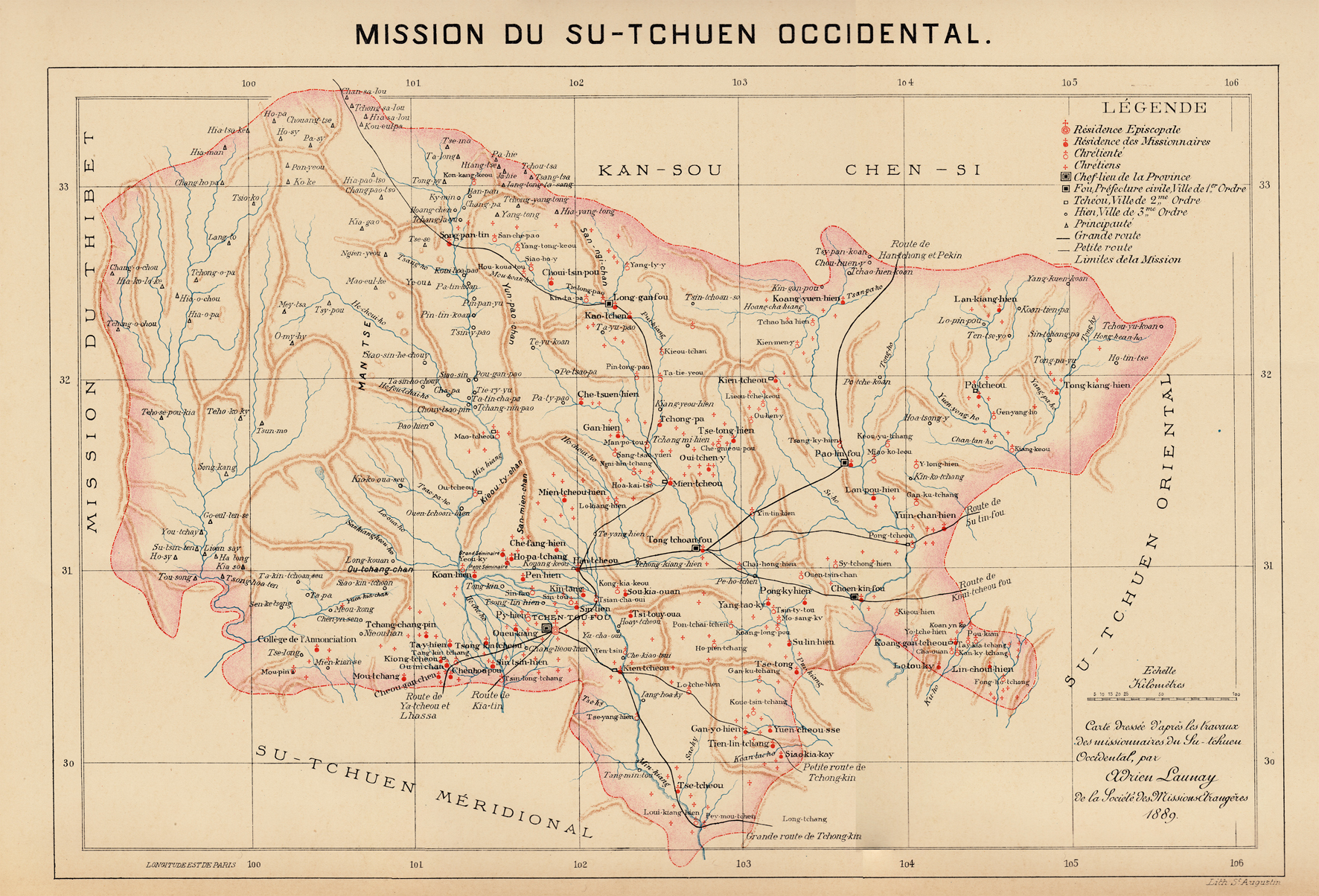
Western Szechwan Mission

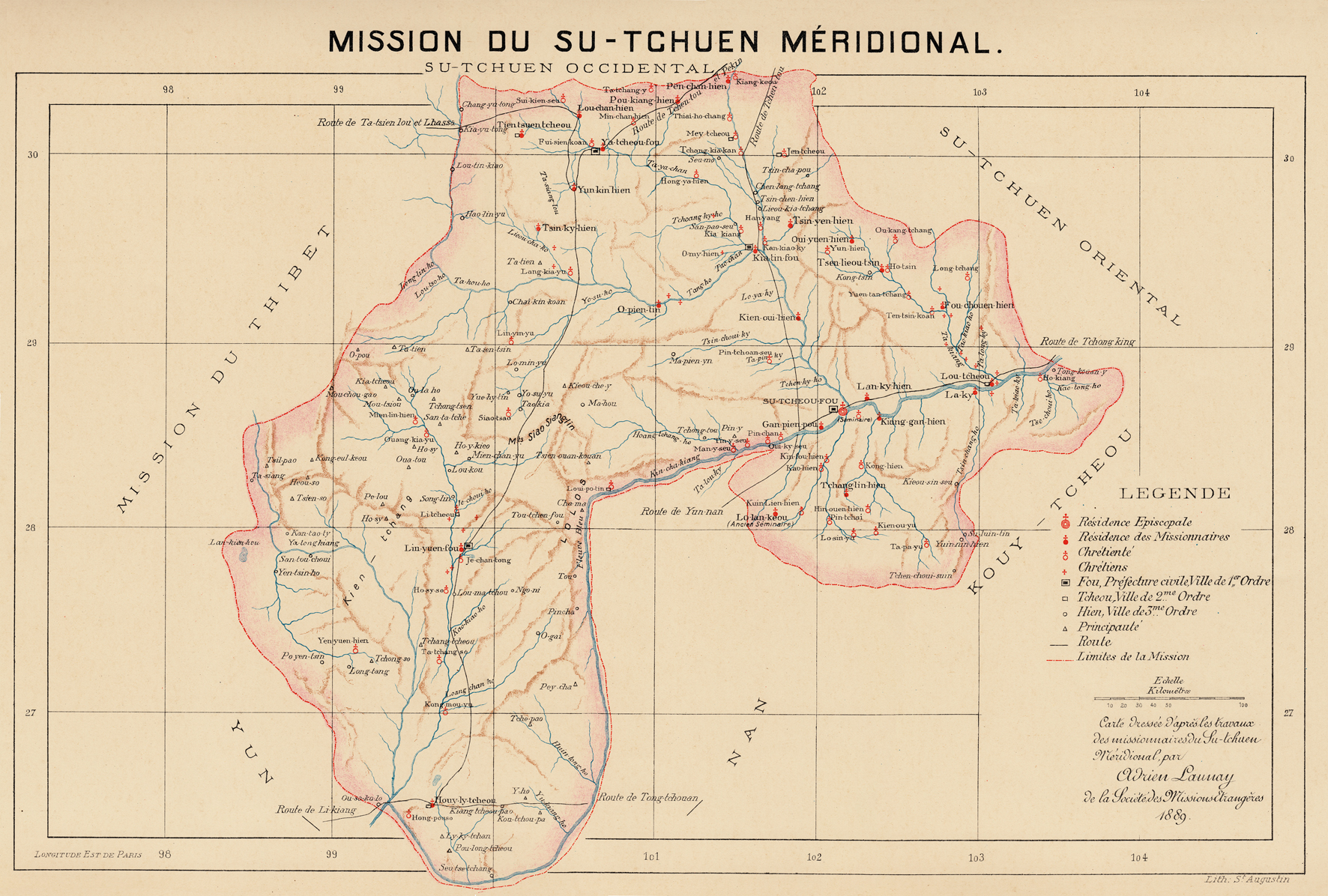
Southern Szechwan Mission

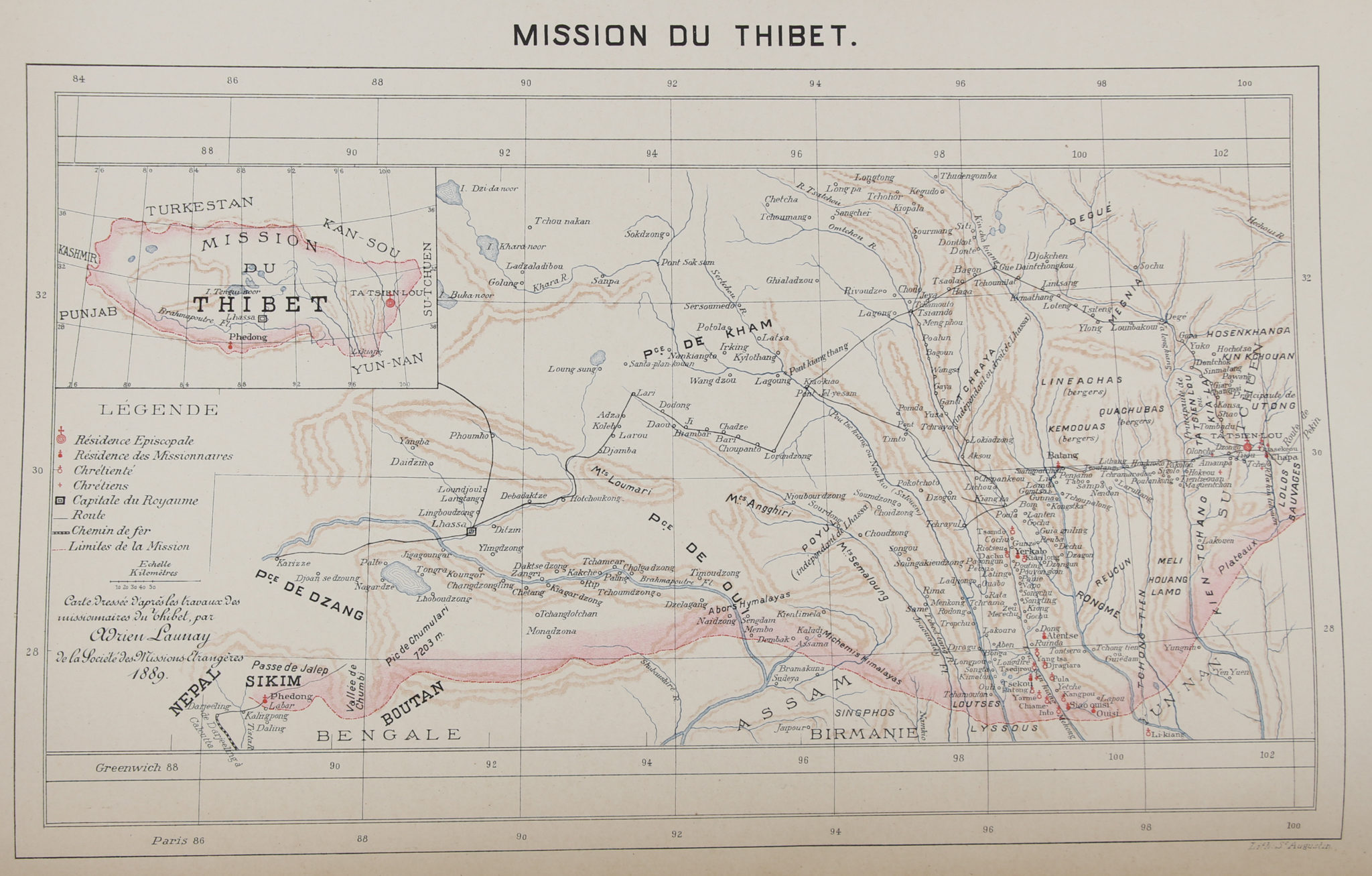
Tibetan Mission

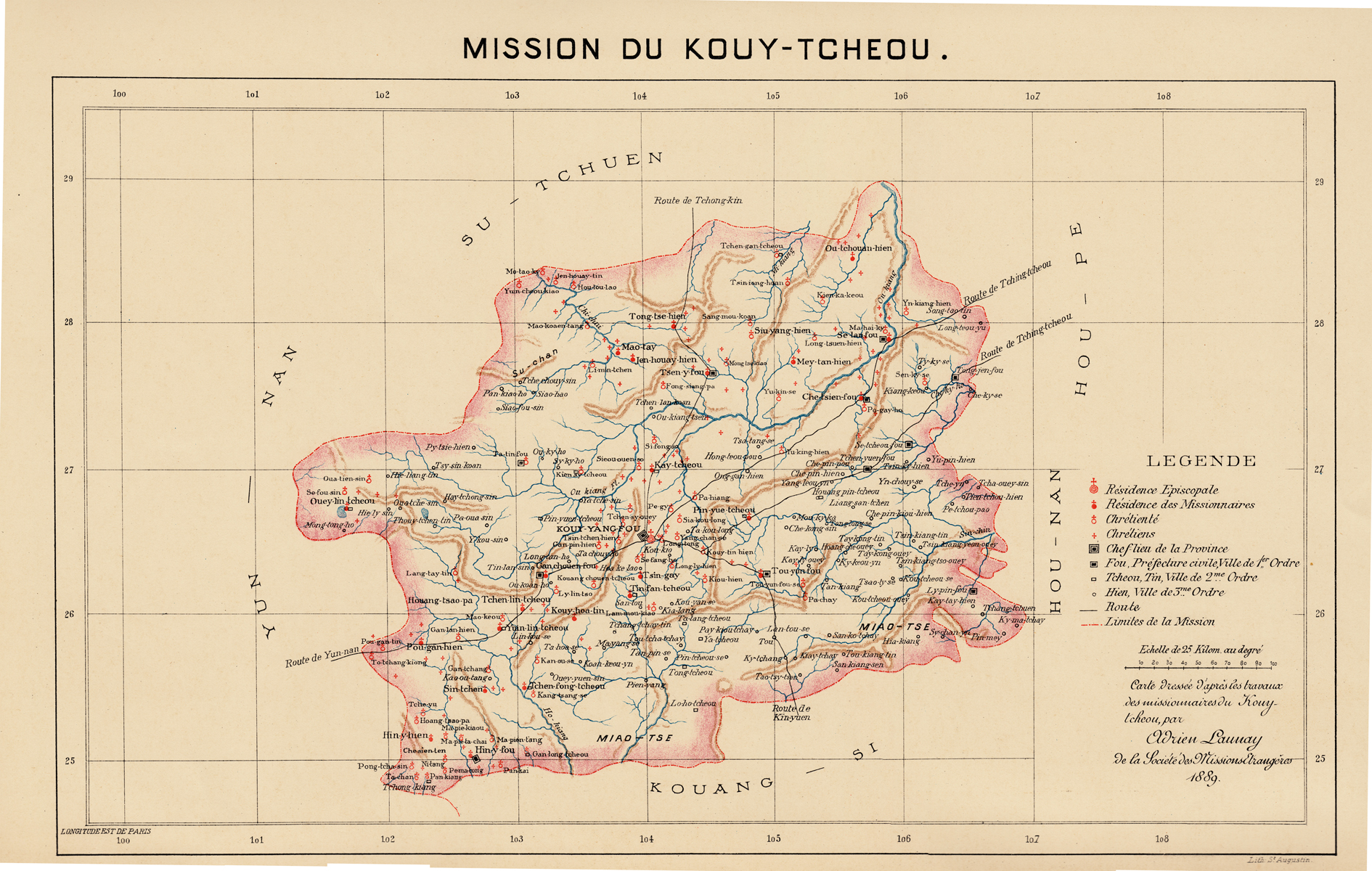
Kweichow Mission

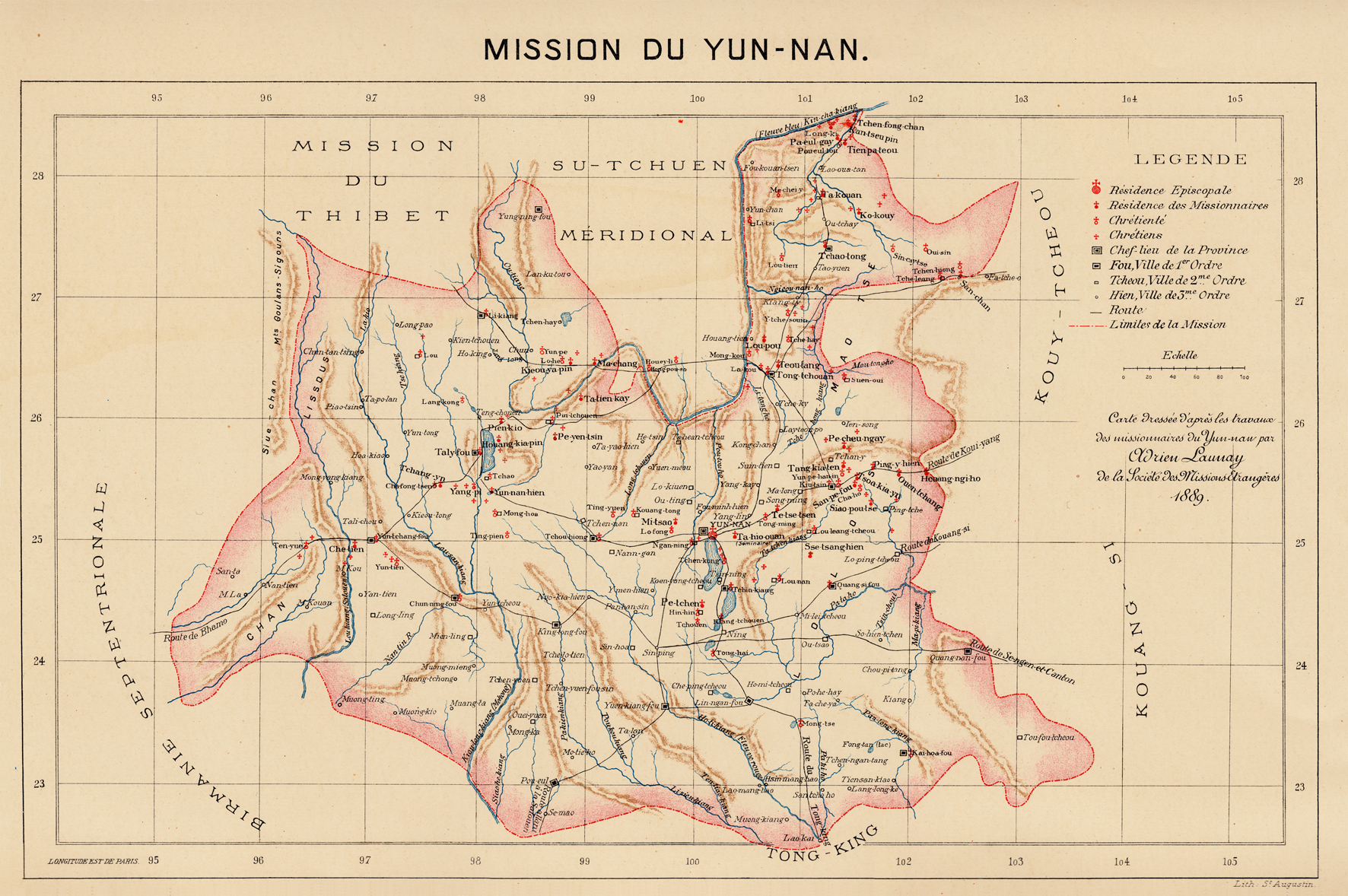
Yunnan Mission

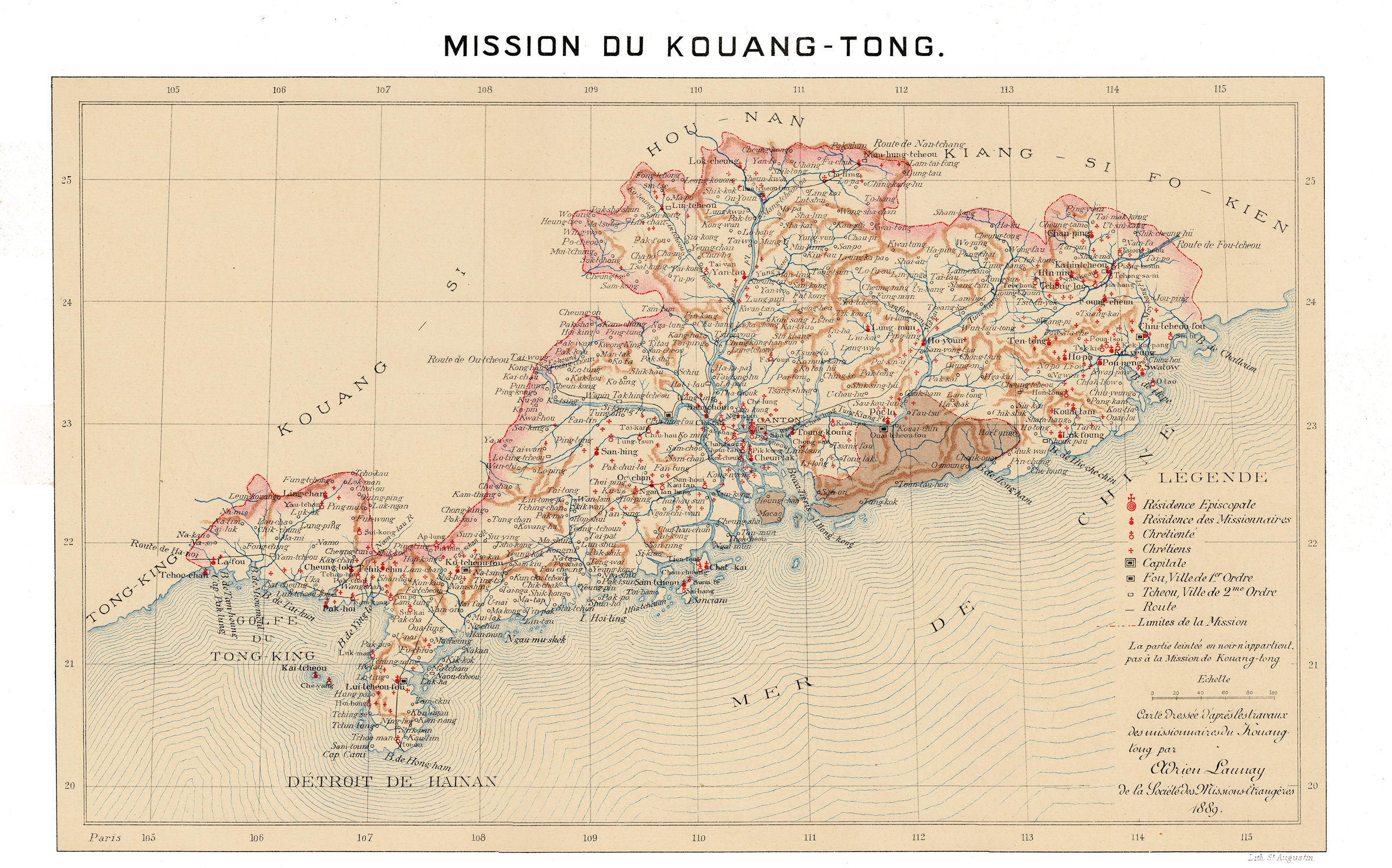
Canton Mission

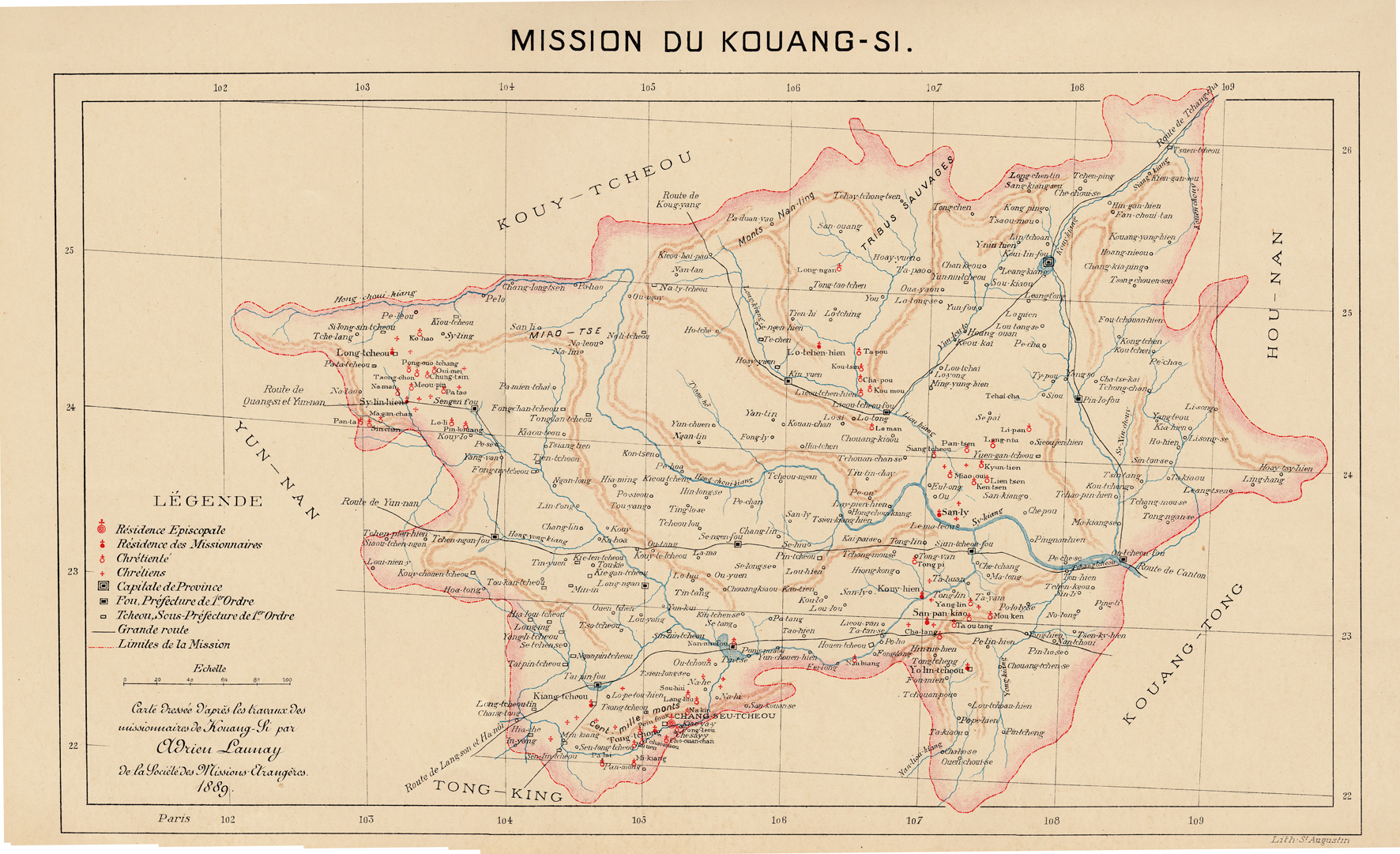
Kwanghsi Mission

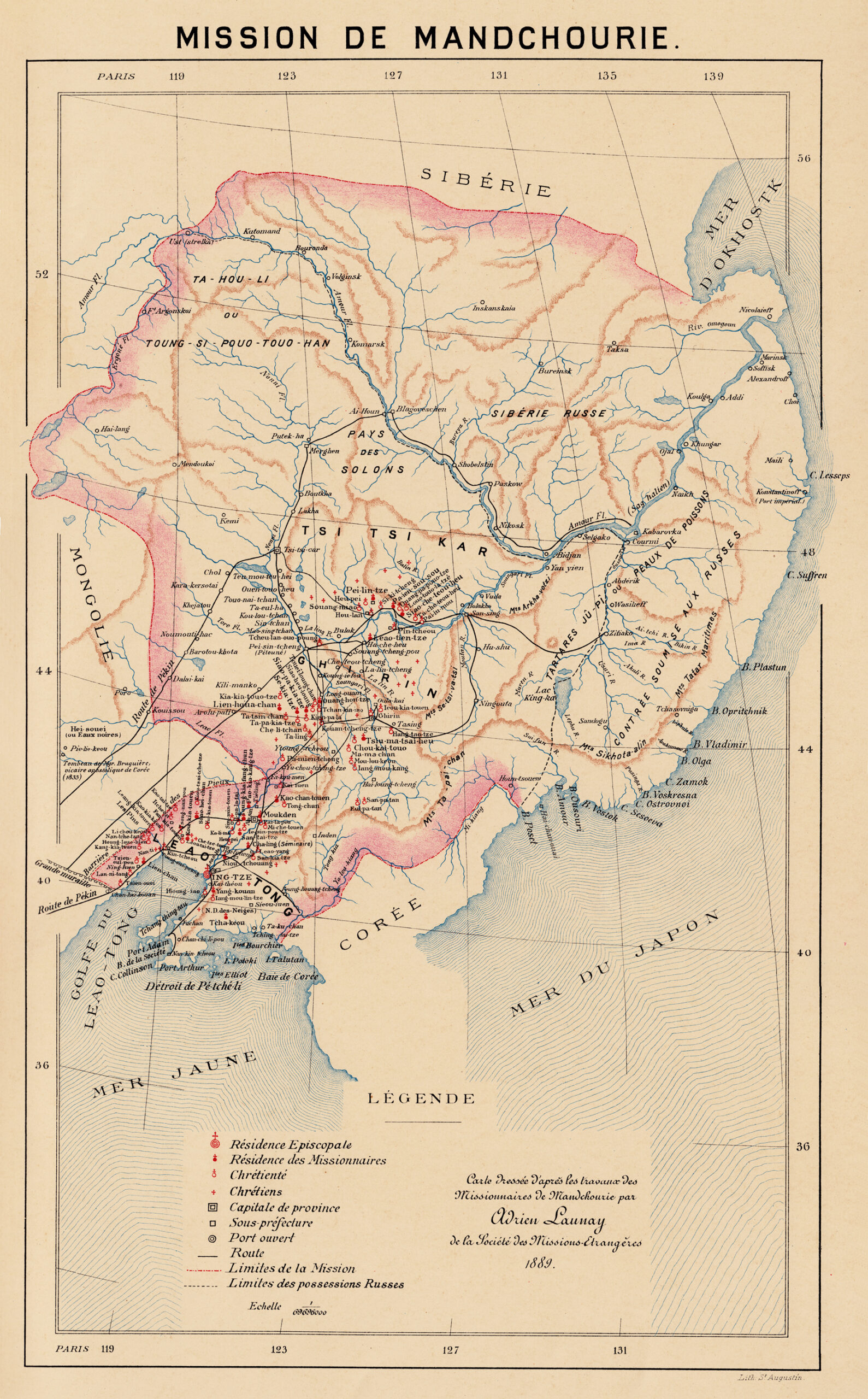
Manchurian Mission

=== Japan ===
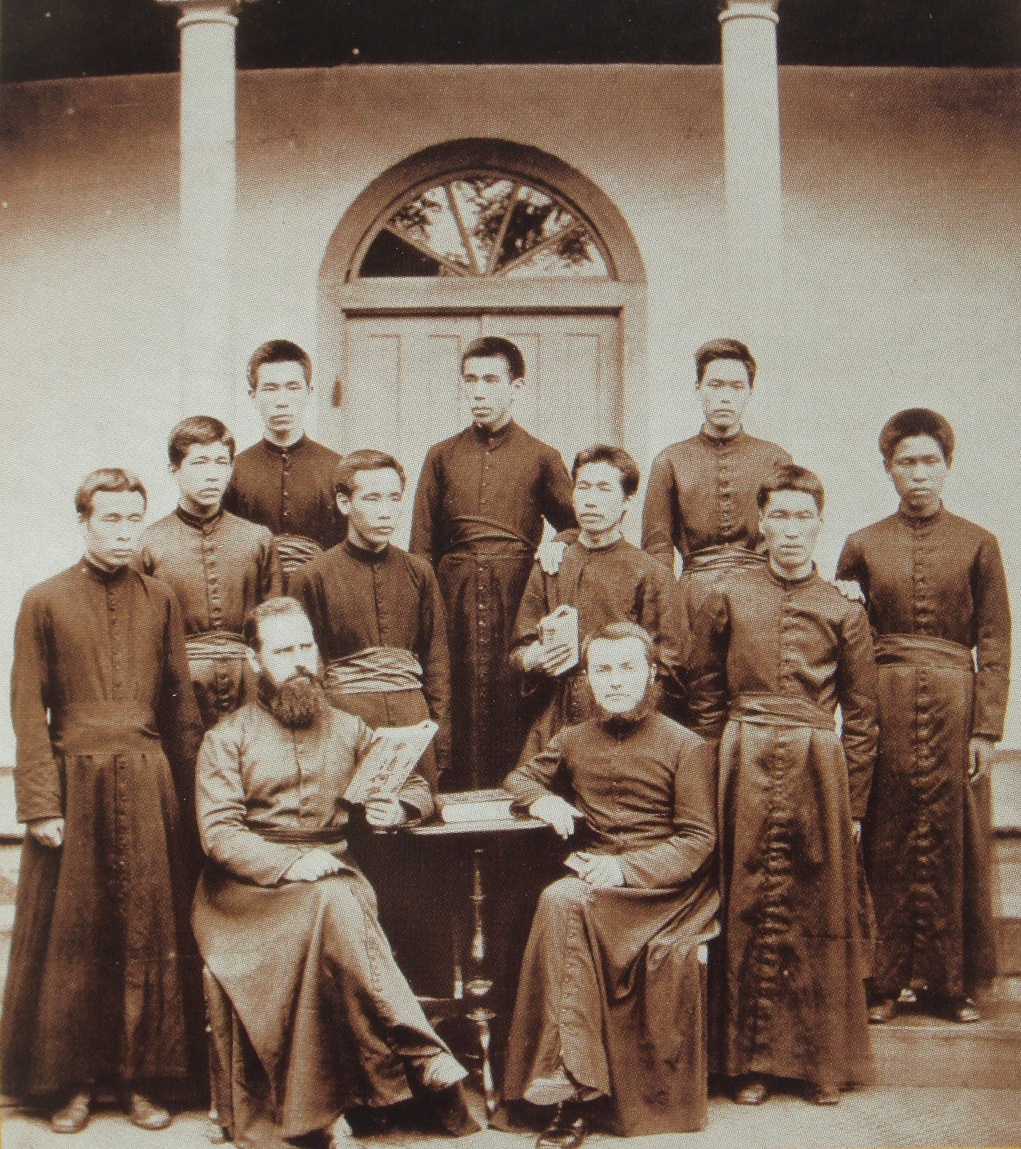
MEP Fathers and seminarists in southern Japan in 1881

After the suppression of Christianity in Japan from around 1620 and nearly two century of strictly enforced seclusion thereafter, various contacts occurred from the middle of the 19th century as France was trying to expand its influence in Asia. After the signature of the Treaty of Nanking by Great Britain in 1842, both France and the United States tried to increase their efforts in the Orient.

The first attempts at resuming contacts occurred with the Ryūkyū Kingdom (modern Okinawa), a vassal of the Japanese fief of Satsuma since 1609. In 1844, a French naval expedition under Captain Fornier-Duplan onboard Alcmène visited Okinawa on 28 April 1844. Trade was denied, but Father Forcade of the Paris Foreign Missions Society was left behind with a Chinese translator, named Auguste Ko. Forcade and Ko remained in the Temple of Amiku, city of Tomari, under strict surveillance, only able to learn the Japanese language from monks. After a period of one year, on 1 May 1846, the French ship Sabine, commanded by Guérin, arrived, soon followed by La Victorieuse, commanded by Charles Rigault de Genouilly, and Cléopâtre, under Admiral Cécille. They came with the news that Pope Gregory XVI had nominated Forcade Bishop of Samos and Vicar Apostolic of Japan. Cécille offered the kingdom French protection against British expansionism, but in vain, and only obtained that two missionaries could stay.

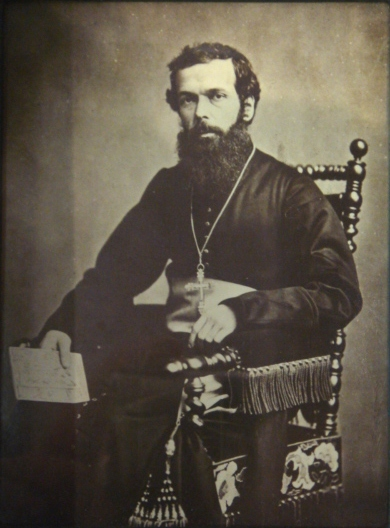
Petitjean, of the Paris Foreign Missions Society, first effective Vicar Apostolic of Japan

Forcade and Ko were picked up to be used as translators in Japan, and Leturdu was left in Tomari, soon joined by Mathieu Adnet. On 24 July 1846, Admiral Cécille arrived in Nagasaki, but failed in his negotiations and was denied landing, and Bishop Forcade never set foot in mainland Japan. The Ryu-Kyu court in Naha complained in early 1847 about the presence of the French missionaries, who had to be removed in 1848.

France would have no further contacts with Okinawa for the next 7 years, until news came that Commodore Perry had obtained an agreement with the islands on 11 July 1854, following his treaty with Japan. France sent an embassy under Rear-Admiral Cécille onboard La Virginie in order to obtain similar advantages. A convention was signed on 24 November 1855.

As contacts between France and Japan developed during the Bakumatsu period (on the military side this is the period of the first French military mission to Japan), Japan was formed into a unique Vicariate Apostolic from 1866 until 1876. The Vicariate was administered by Bernard Petitjean, of the Paris Foreign Missions Society (1866–1884).

== 20th century ==
The following table shows the state of the missions at the turn of the 20th century:

== Missions of Japan and Korea == : Tokio; Nagasaki; Osaka; Hakodate; Korea; === Total numbers === : Catholics, 138,624; churches or chapels, 238; bishops and missionaries, 166; native priests, 48; catechists, 517; seminaries, 4; seminarists, 81; communities of men and women, 44, containing 390 persons; schools, 161, with 9024 pupils; orphanages and work-rooms, 38, with 988 children; pharmacies, dispensaries, and hospitals, 19	== Missions of China and Tibet == : Western Szechwan; Eastern Szechwan; Southern Szechwan; Tibet; Yunnan; Kweichow; Guangdong; Guangxi; Southern Manchuria; Northern Manchuria; === Total numbers === : Catholics, 272,792; churches or chapels, 1392; bishops and missionaries, 408; native priests, 191; catechists, 998; seminaries, 19; seminarists, 661; communities of men and women, 23, with 222 members; schools, 1879, with 31,971 pupils; orphanages and work-rooms, 132, with 4134 children; pharmacies, dispensaries, and hospitals, 364	== Missions of Eastern Indo-China == : Tongking; Cochinchina; Cambodia; === Total numbers === : Catholics, 632,830; churches or chapels, 2609; bishops and missionaries, 365; native priests, 491; catechists, 1153; seminaries, 14; seminarists, 1271; communities of men and women, 91, with 2538 persons; schools, 1859, with 58,434 pupils; orphanages and work-rooms, 106, with 7217 children; pharmacies, dispensaries, and hospitals, 107	== Missions of Western Indo-China == : Siam; Malacca; Laos; Southern Burma; Northern Burma; === Total numbers === : Catholics, 132,226; churches or chapels, 451; bishops and missionaries, 199; native priests, 42; catechists, 242; seminaries, 3; seminarists, 81; communities of men and women, 47, with 529 members; schools, 320, with 21,306 pupils; orphanages and work-rooms, 132, with 3757 children; pharmacies, dispensaries, and hospitals, 86	== Missions of India == : Pondicherry; Mysore; Coimbatore; Kumbakonam; === Total numbers === : Catholics, 324,050; churches or chapels, 1048; bishops and missionaries, 207; native priests, 67; catechists, 274; seminaries, 4; seminarists, 80; communities of men and women, 54, with 787 members; schools, 315, with 18,693 pupils; orphanages and work-rooms, 57, with 2046 children; pharmacies, dispensaries, and hospitals, 41

A sanatorium for sick missionaries was established in Hong Kong (Béthanie); another in India among the Nilgiri mountains, and a third in France. In Hong Kong there were also a house of spiritual retreat and a printing establishment (Nazareth) which published works of art of the Far East – dictionaries, grammars, books of theology, piety, Christian doctrine, and pedagogy. Houses of correspondence, or agencies, were established in the Far East, in Shanghai, Hong Kong, Saigon, Singapore, and one in Marseille, France.

== Exhibits ==
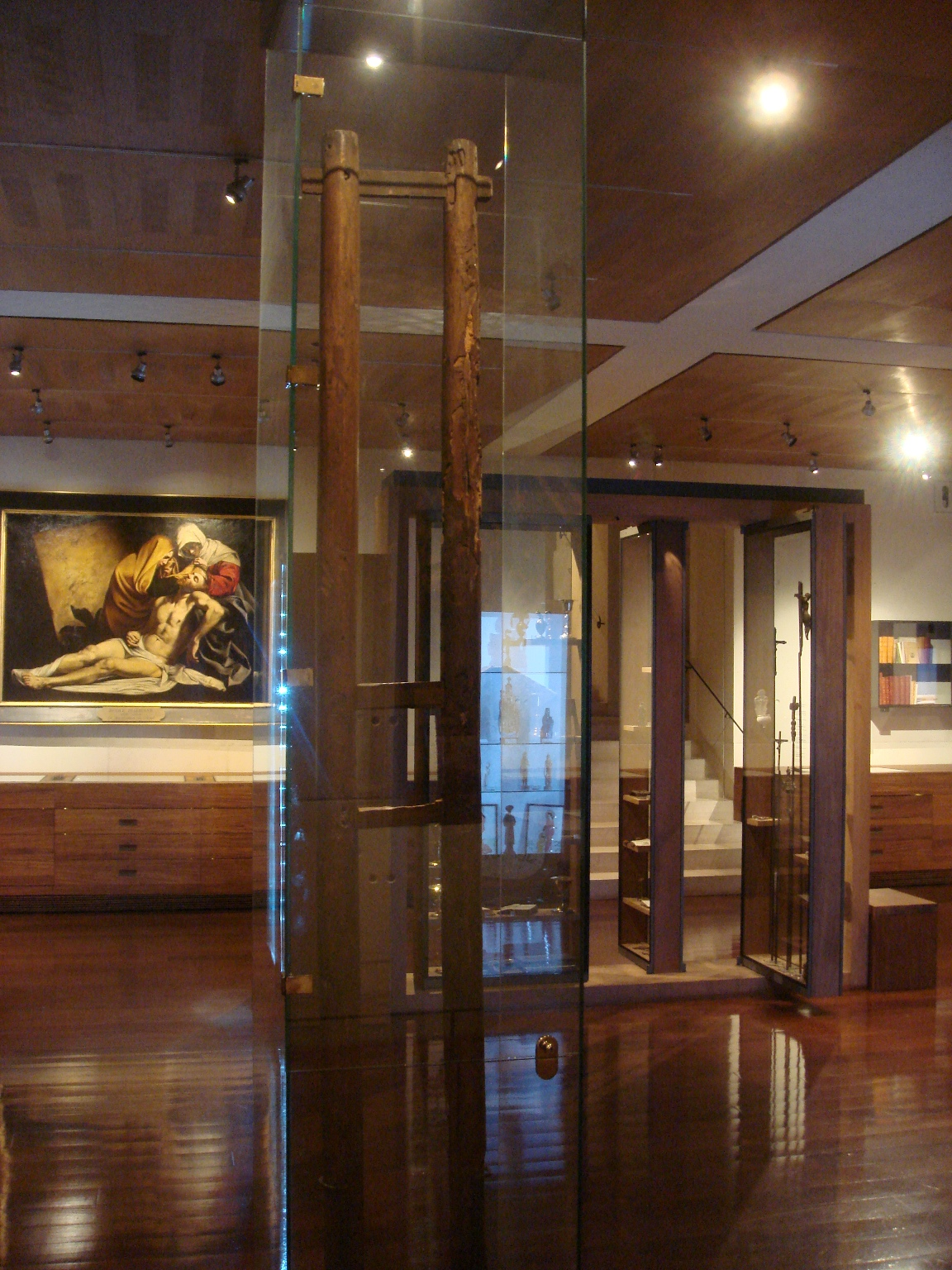
Salle des Martyrs. The ladder-like apparatus in the middle is the cangue that was worn by Pierre Borie in captivity.

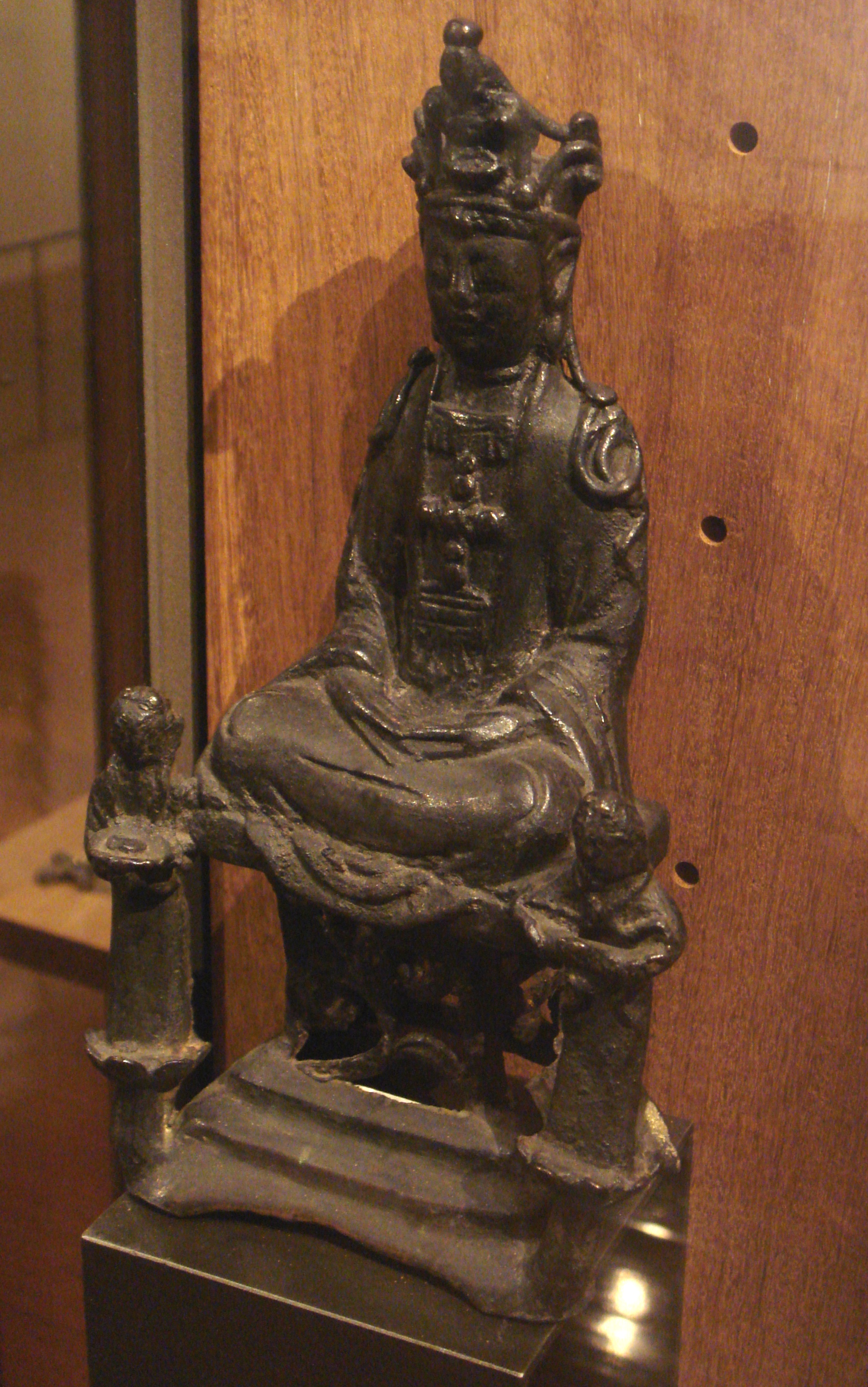
The Virgin Mary disguised as Kannon, Kirishitan cult, 17th century Japan. Salle des Martyrs, Paris Foreign Missions Society.

The crypt at the Paris Foreign Missions Society headquarters located Rue du Bac houses a permanent display called "Salle des Martyrs" ("Room of the Martyrs"). Numerous artifacts are on display, mainly remains and relics of martyred members of the missions, depictions of various martyrdoms endured during the history of the missions, and objects related to the Catholic Faith in the various countries of Asia. Also, historical archives and graphic material are available, regarding the details of the missions. The Salle des Martyrs can be visited for free from Tuesday to Saturday, from 11:00 to 18:30, and on Sundays from 13:00 to 18:00.

Another, much larger, exhibition is located on the ground floor of the main building of the Paris Foreign Missions Society. Established as a temporary exhibition in 2007–2008, it remains in place but is now closed to the general public. It is only opened for visits once a year during the free-access "Journée des Musées Nationaux", although there seem to be plans to make it a permanent exhibition in the near future.

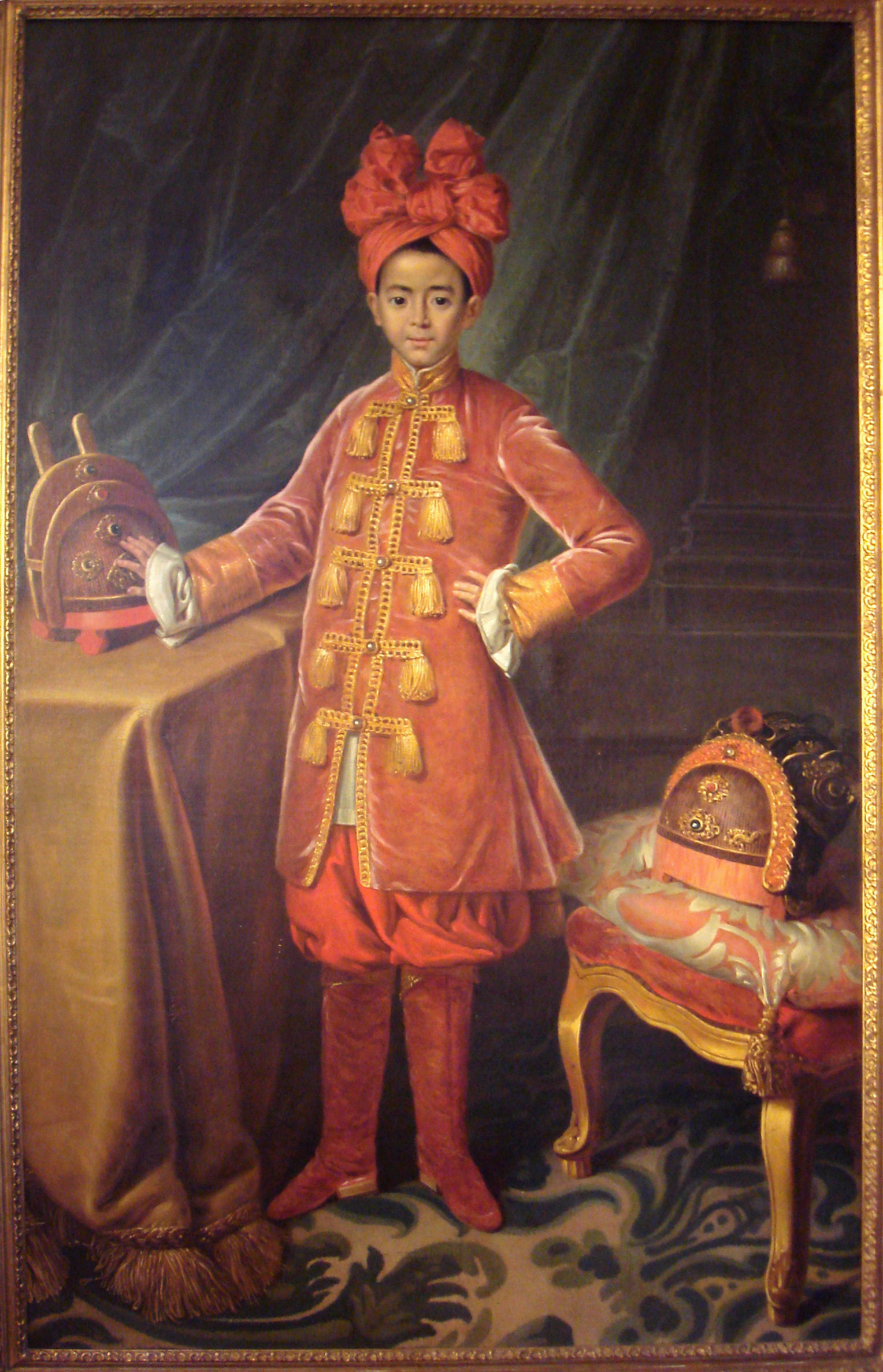
Portrait of Vietnamese crown prince Nguyễn Phúc Cảnh

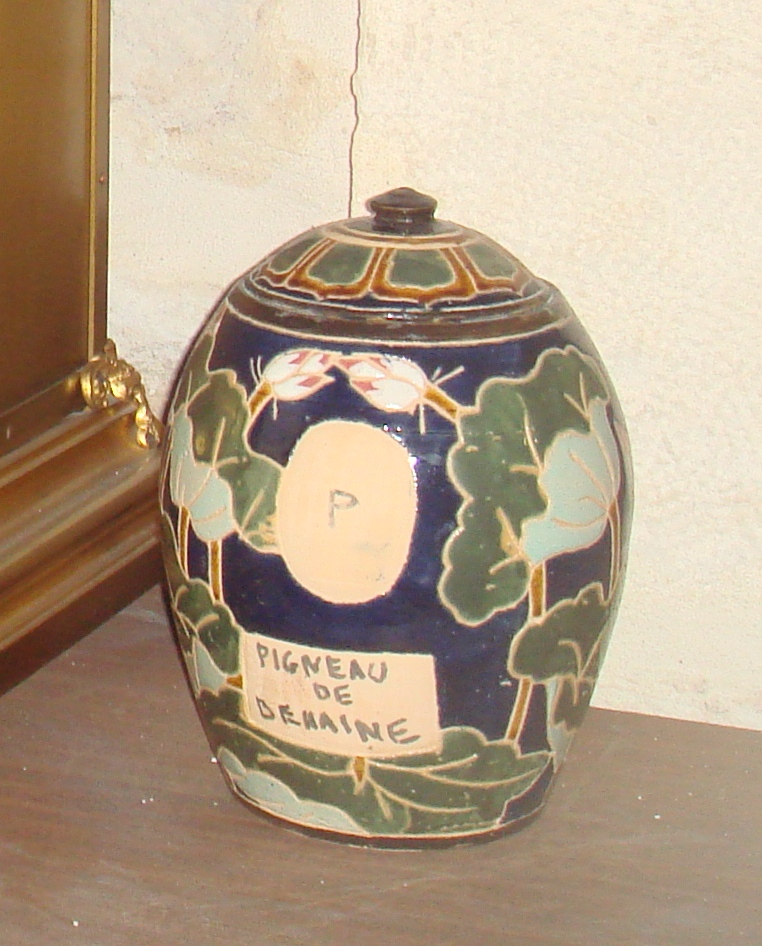
Ashes of Pigneau de Behaine

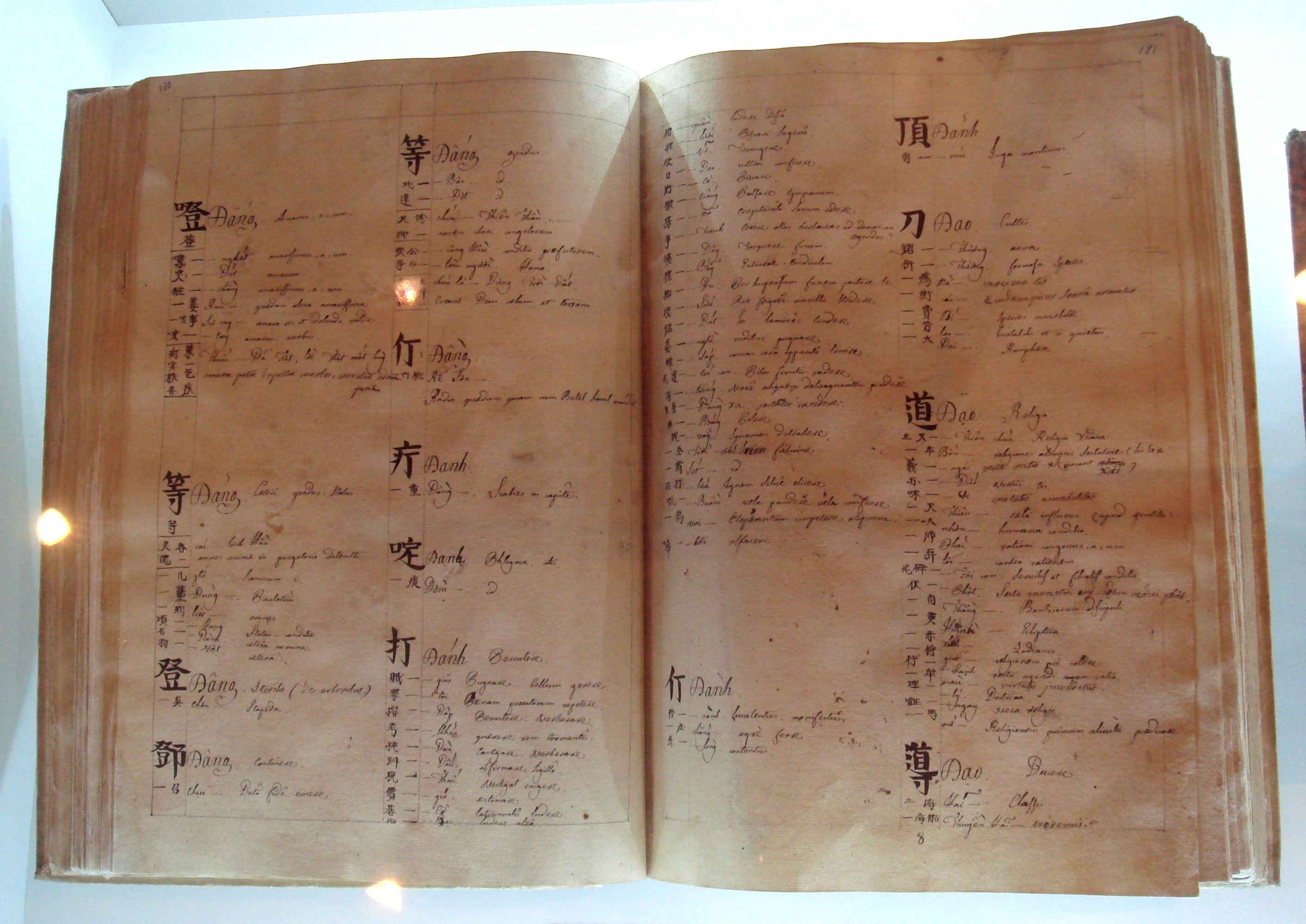
Pigneau's 1772 Dictionarium Anamitico-Latinum

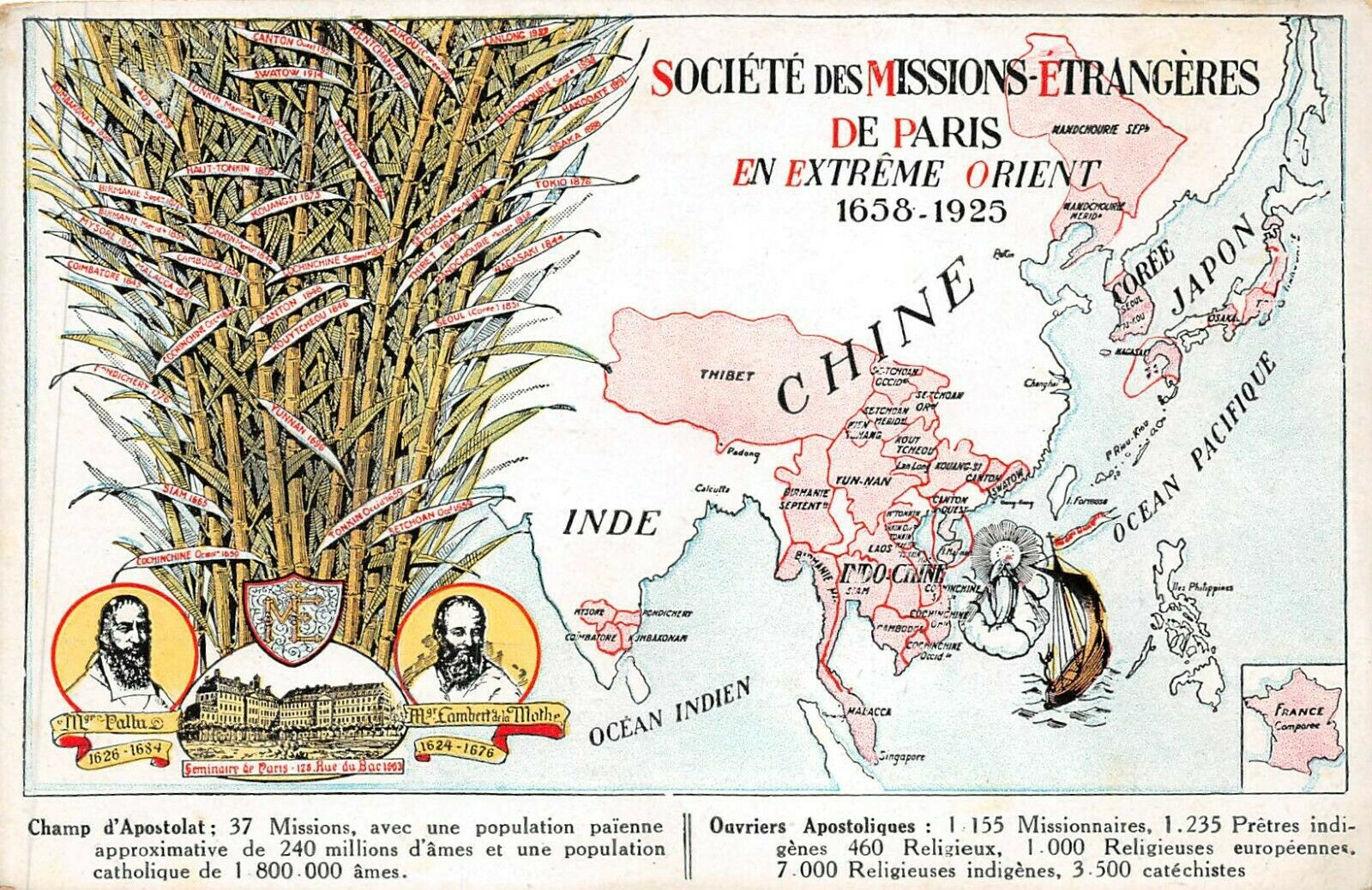
The Society in 1925

== Park ==
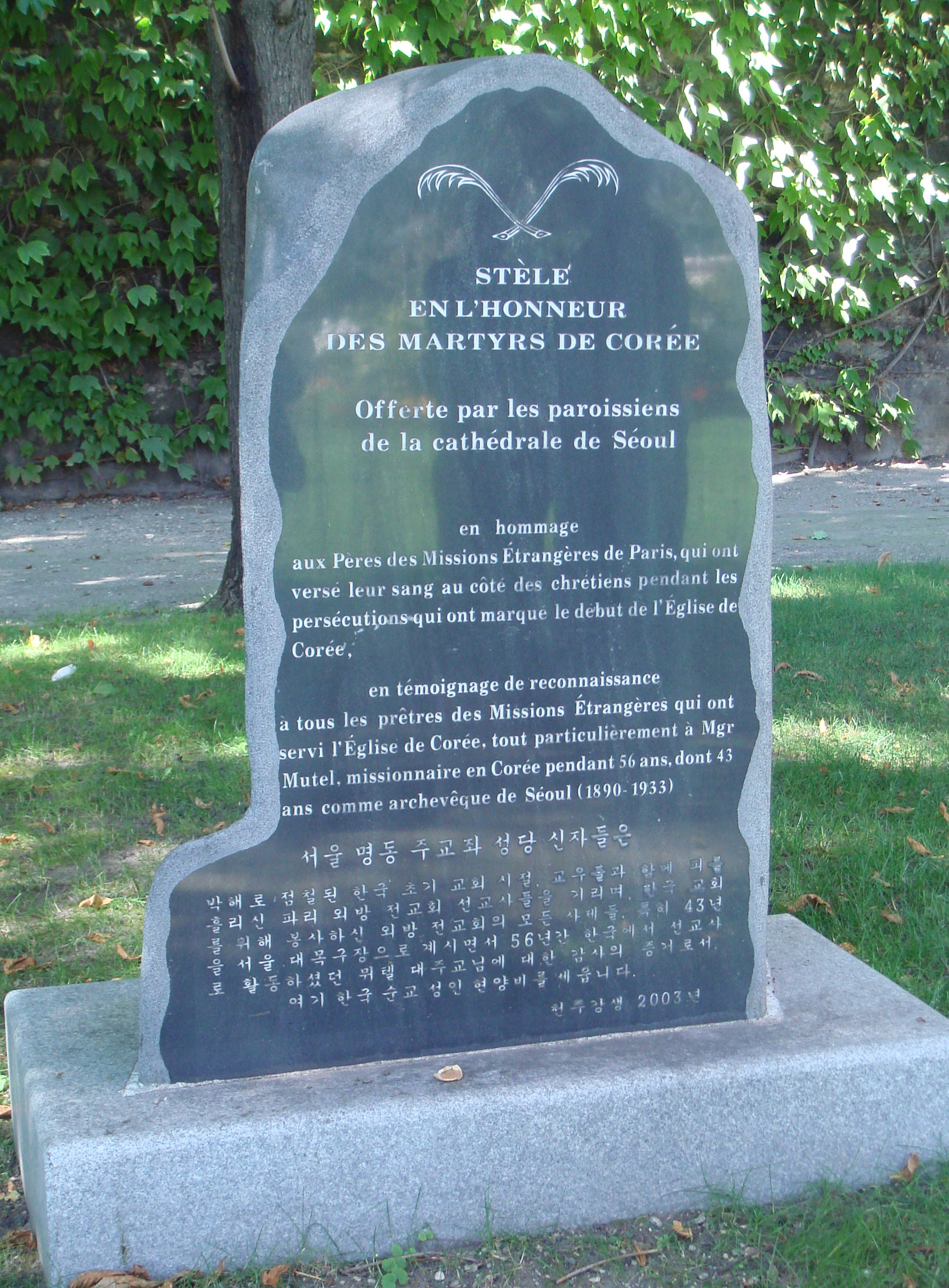
Stela to the members of the Paris Foreign Missions Society who were martyred in Korea

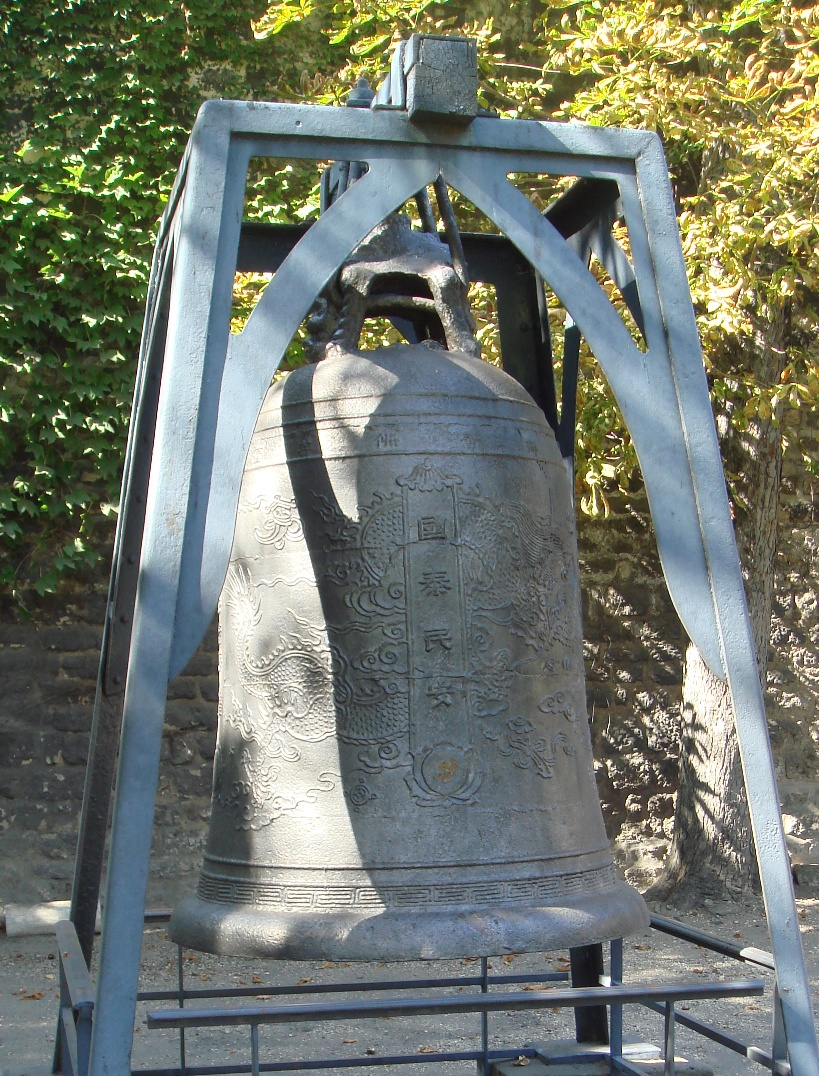
Chinese bell brought from Canton by Charles Rigault de Genouilly, now in the park of the Paris Foreign Missions Society

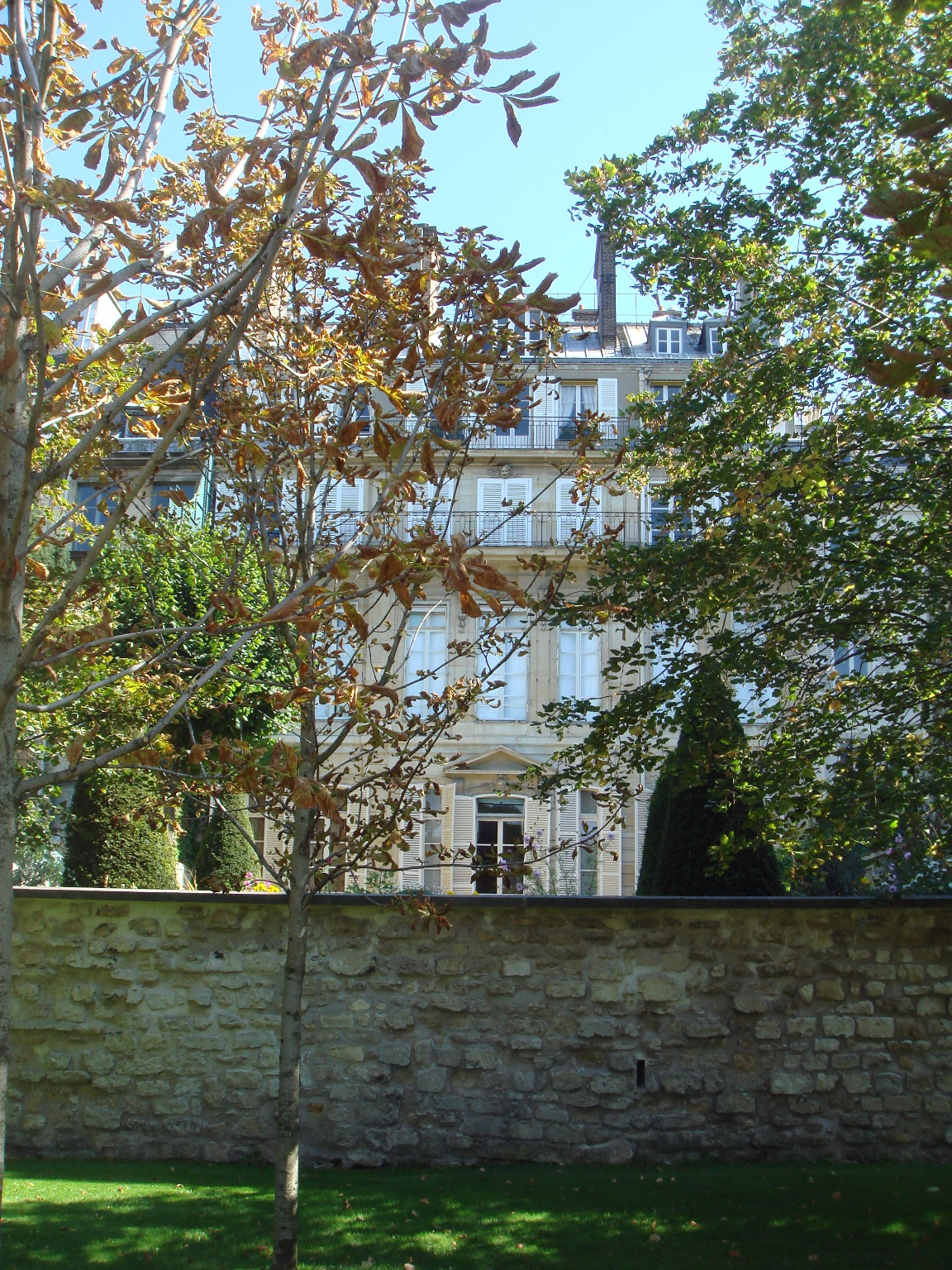
House of Chateaubriand, 120 Rue du Bac, with view on the park of the Paris Foreign Missions Society

The park of the Paris Foreign Missions Society is the largest private garden in Paris. It houses various significant artifacts, such as a Chinese bell from Canton brought to France by the French Admiral Charles Rigault de Genouilly, a stela to Korean Martyrs and the list of canonized members of the Paris Foreign Missions Society. The park can be visited every Saturday at 15:30.

The French writer Chateaubriand lived in an apartment 120 Rue du Bac, with a view on the park, a fact he mentions in the last paragraph of his Mémoires d'Outre-Tombe:

"As I write these last words, my window, which looks west over the gardens of the Foreign Mission, is open: it is six in the morning; I can see the pale and swollen moon; it is sinking over the spire of the Invalides, scarcely touched by the first golden glow from the East; one might say that the old world was ending, and the new beginning. I behold the light of a dawn whose sunrise I shall never see. It only remains for me to sit down at the edge of my grave; then I shall descend boldly, crucifix in hand, into eternity."

— Chateaubriand Mémoires d'Outre-Tombe Book XLII: Chapter 18

== Venerated members of the Society ==
=== Saints ===
As part of the 117 Martyrs of Vietnam, 10 martyrs of the M.E.P. were canonized by Pope John Paul II on 19 June 1988, including 11 Dominican priests, 37 Vietnamese priests, and 59 Vietnamese laity:

- François-Isidore Gagelin (10 May 1799 – 17 October 1833), priest
- Joseph Marchand (17 August 1803 – 30 November 1835), priest
- Jean-Charles Cornay (27 February 1809 – 20 September 1837), priest
- François Jaccard (16 September 1799 – 21 September 1838), priest
- Pierre Borie (20 February 1808 – 24 November 1838), Titular Bishop of Achantus and Vicar Apostolic of Western Tonking
- Augustin Schoeffler (22 November 1822 – 1 May 1851), priest
- Jean-Louis Bonnard (1 March 1824 – 1 May 1852), priest
- Pierre-François Néron (21 September 1818 – 3 November 1860), priest
- Théophane Vénard (21 November 1829 – 2 February 1861), priest
- Étienne-Théodore Cuenot (8 February 1802 – 14 November 1861), Titular Bishop of Metellopolis and Vicar Apostolic of Eastern Cochinchina

As part of the 103 Martyrs of Korea, 10 martyrs of the M.E.P. were canonized by Pope John Paul II on 6 May 1984,including Andrew Kim Taegon, the first Korean priest, and 92 Korean laity:

- Laurent-Marie-Joseph Imbert (15 April 1797 – 21 September 1839), Titular Bishop of Capsus and Apostolic Vicar of Korea
- Pierre-Philibert Maubant (20 September 1803 – 21 September 1839), priest
- Jacques-Honore Chastan (7 October 1803 – 21 September 1839), priest
- Siméon-Francois Berneux (14 May 1814 – 7 March 1866), Titular Bishop of Capsus and Apostolic Vicar of Korea
- Sinon-Marie-Just Ranfer de Bretenières (28 February 1838 – 7 March 1866), priest
- Bernard-Louis Beaulieu (8 October 1840 – 7 March 1866), priest
- Pierre-Henri Dorie (23 September 1839 – 7 March 1866), priest
- Antoine Daveluy (16 March 1818 – 30 March 1866), Titular Bishop of Akka and Coadjutor Apostolic Vicar of Korea
- Pierre Aumaître (April 1837 – 30 March 1866), priest
- Martin-Luc Huin (20 October 1836 – 30 March 1866), priest

As part of 120 Martyrs of China, 3 missionaries of the M.E.P. were canonized by Pope John Paul II on 1 October 2000, including 9 Franciscans, 6 Dominicans, 7 Franciscan missionary sisters of Mary, 1 Lazarist, 1 Italian priest of the Foreign Missions of Milan, 4 Chinese priests and 83 Chinese laity:

- Gabriel-Taurin Dufresse (8 December 1750 – 14 September 1815), Titular Bishop of Thrabaca and Vicar Apostolic of Szechwan
- Auguste Chapdelaine (6 January 1814 – 29 February 1856), priest
- Jean-Pierre Néel (18 October 1832 – 18 February 1862), priest

=== Blesseds ===
As part of 17 Martyrs of Laos, 5 martyrs of the M.E.P. were beatified under Pope Francis' pontificate on 11 December 2016.

- Jean-Baptiste Malo (2 June 1889 – 28 March 1954), priest
- René Dubroux (28 November 1914 – 19 December 1959), priest
- Noël Tenaud (11 November 1904 – 27 April 1961), priest
- Marcel Denis (8 July 1919 – 31 July 1961), priest
- Lucien Galan (9 December 1921 – 12 May 1968), priest

Non-martyred members include:

- Jean-Martin Moye (27 January 1730 – 4 May 1793), priest and missionary, beatified on 21 November 1954 by Pope Pius XII

=== Servants of God ===
- François Pallu (c. 1626 – 29 October 1684), founder of the Society, declared as a Servant of God on 9 October 2023
- Pierre Lambert de la Motte (16 January 1624 – 15 June 1679), founder of the Society, Titular Bishop of Berytus, Apostolic Vicar of Cochin, and founder of the Lovers of the Holy Cross, declared as a Servant of God in 2023
- Barthélemy Bruguière (12 February 1792 – 20 October 1835), titular bishop of Capsus, apostolic vicar of Korea, declared as a Servant of God on 12 January 2023
- Nicolas-Michel Krick (1 March 1819 – 1 September 1854), martyred in Arunanchal Pradesh, India, declared as a Servant of God in 2013
- Augustin-Étienne Bourry (27 December 1826 – 1 September 1854), martyred in Arunanchal Pradesh, India, declared as a Servant of God in 2013
- Jean-Baptiste Houillon (3 December 1825 – 27 May 1871), Martyr of the Paris Commune
- Louis Savinien Dupuis (18 August 1806 – 4 June 1874), founder of Franciscan Sisters of the Immaculate Heart of Mary ‒ Pondicherry and Franciscan Sisters of the Immaculate Heart of Mary ‒ Quinlon, declared as a Servant of God on 4 April 2016
- Joseph-Louis Ravel (24 August 1824 – 31 January 1881), founder of the Franciscan Sisters of the Presentation of Mary, declared as a Servant of God on 8 March 2019
- Pierre Rapin (26 July 1926 – 24 February 1972), Martyr of Cambodia
- Marie-Pierre-Jean Cassaigne (30 January 1895 – 31 October 1973), Titular Bishop of Gadara and Apostolic Vicar of Saigon

== See also ==
- Timeline of Christian missions
- Catholic religious order
- Society of Saint-Sulpice
- Catholic Church in Asia
- Christianity in Asia
- Chinese Rites controversy
- Category:Paris Foreign Missions Society
- Former French Mission Building in Hong Kong
- Augustine Périé
- Augustin Bourry
