= Chronological list of saints and blesseds in the 19th century =

A list of people, who died during the 19th century, who have received recognition as Blessed (through beatification) or Saint (through canonization) from the Catholic Church:

Name	Birth	Birthplace	Death	Place of death	Notes
Blessed Didacus Joseph of Cadiz	1743	Cádiz, Spain	1801		
Joseph Pignatelli	1737	Zaragoza, Spain	1811		
Blessed Giles Mary of St. Joseph	1729		1812		
Blessed Peter Ou			1814		
Augustine Zhao Rong			1815		
Francis Bianchi	1743		1815		
Gabriel-Taurin Dufresse	1750		1815		Bishop of Sichuan province
Blessed Joseph Tchang Ta-Pong	1754		1815		
Blessed Joseph Yuen			1815		
Julie Billiart	1751	Cuvilly, Picardy, France	1816	Namur, Belgium	
John Lantrua of Triora	1760		1816		
Joseph Yuan	1766		1817		
Peter Liu Hanzuo			1819		
Clement Mary Hofbauer	1751		1820		
Blessed Francis Regis Clet	1748		1820		
Elizabeth Ann Seton	1774	New York City	1821	Emmitsburg, Maryland	
Antonio Galvao	1739		1822		
Blessed Thaddeus Lieu	1773		1823		
Vincent Strambi	1745		1824		Bishop of Macera
Blessed Anne Catherine Emmerick	1774		1824		
Blessed Elisabeth Canori Mora	1774		1825		
Joan Antidea Thouret (Jane Antide)	1765		1828		
Blessed Dominic Lentini	1770		1828		
Blessed Vincent Romano	1751		1831		
Bartholomea Capitanio	1807		1833		
Francis Isidore Gagelin	1799		1833		
Paul Tong Buong			1833		
Peter Tuy			1833		
Andrew Hubert Fournet	1752		1834		
Peter Liu Wenyuan			1834		
Blessed Peter Lieou			1834		
Andrew Trong van Tran	1814		1835		
Joseph Marchand			1835		
Magdalena of Canossa	1774		1835		
Blessed Catherine Jarrige	1754		1836		
Blessed Nunzio Sulprizio	1817		1836		
Caspar Del Bufalo	1786		1837		
Claudine Thevenet	1774		1837		
Francis Xavier Can			1837		
Jean-Charles Cornay	1809		1837		
Blessed Anna Maria Taigi	1769		1837		
Anthony Peter Dich			1838		
Bernard Due			1838		
Domingo Hanh Van Nguyen	1772		1838		
Domingo Nicolas Dat Dinh	1803		1838		
Dominic Henares			1838		
Dominic Uy, Francis Xavier Mau, Augustin Mot, Stephen Vihn, and Thomas De			1838		
Dominic Van Honh Dieu			1838		
Francis Jaccard			1838		
Ignacio Delgado y Cebrian	1761		1838		Bishop of East Tonkin
James Nam			1838		
Joan Elizabeth Bichier des Ages	1773		1838		
Jose Uyen Dinh Nguyen	1775		1838		
Joseph Canh			1838		
Joseph Peter Uyen			1838		
Joseph Vien Dinh Dang	1786		1838		
Michael My			1838		
Paul My, Peter Duong, and Peter Truat			1838		
Peter Dumoulin-Borle, Peter Vu Dang Khoa, Vincent Nguyen The Diem, and Companions			1838		
Peter Duong			1838		
Peter Tu Van Nguyen and Jose Canh Luong Hoang			1838		
Peter Tu			1838		
Peter Tuan			1838		
Peter Yi Ho-yong	1802		1838		
Thomas Dien			1838		
Vincent Diem			1838		
Vincent Yen			1838		
Blessed Joseph Fernandez			1838		
Blessed Marie Rivier	1768		1838		
Andrew Dung Lac An Tran	1795		1839		
Anne Pak A-gi	1783		1839		
Augustine Moi			1839		
Augustine Nyou Tjin-kil (Yu Chin-gil)	1790		1839		
Augustine of Huy			1839		
Barbara Han A-gi	1791		1839		
Cecilia Ryou So-Sa	1760		1839		
Columba Kim Hyo-im	1813		1839		
Dominic Doan Xuyen			1839		
Dominic Tuoc			1839		
Elizabeth Chong Chong-hye	1796		1839		
Francis Ch'oe Kyong-Hwan	1804		1839		
Jacques Honore Chastan	1803		1839		priest and martyr
Joachim Hao Kaizhi			1839		
John Baptist Yi Kwang-nyol			1839		
Joseph Chang Song-jib	1785		1839		
Julietta Kim Yuridae	1783		1839		
Laurent Imbert	1796		1839		Bishop of Capsa
Lucy Pak Hui-sun	1800		1839		
Magdalene Ho Kye-im	1771		1839		
Magdalene Pak Pong-son	1795		1839		
Nicholas The and Augustine Hue			1839		
Peter Thi	1763		1839		
Peter Yu Taech'oi			1839		
Protasius Chong Kuk-bo	1798		1839		
Thomas Du			1839		
Blessed Francis Man			1839		
Agatha Kwon Chin-I	1819		1840		
Agatha Yi	1822		1840		
Andrew Chong Hwa-Gyong	1807		1840		
Anthony Kim Song-U	1794		1840		
Anthony Nam-Quynh	1768		1840		
John Baptist Con			1840		
John Baptist Thanh			1840		
Joseph Hien Quang Do	1775		1840		
Joseph Nghi, priest and martyr, and Companions			1840		
Joseph Nien Vien			1840		
Luke Loan			1840		
Mary Yi In-dok	1818		1840		
Paul Ho Hyob	1795		1840		
Paul Khoan Khan Pham and Companions			1840		
Paul Ngan			1840		
Peter Hieu			1840		
Peter Hong Pyong-ju and Paul Hong Yong-ju			1840		
Peter Tu			1840		
Stephen Min Kuk-ka	1787		1840		
Theresa Kim	1795		1840		
Blessed John-Gabriel Perboyre			1840		
Marcellinus Champagnat	1789		1840		
Blessed Stephen Bellesini	1774		1840		
Thomas Toan			1840		
Agnes Le Thi Thanh	1781		1841		
Peter Chanel	1803		1841		
Dominic Trach			1842		
Giuseppe Benedetto Cottolengo	1786		1842		
Peter Khanh	1780		1842		
Blessed Edmund Ignatius Rice	1762		1844		
Blessed Peter Francis Jamet	1762		1845		
Andrew Kim Taegon	1821		1846		
Anthony Mary Gianelli	1789		1846		Bishop of Bobbio
Charles Hyon Song-mun	1797		1846		
Mary Magdalen Postel	1756		1846		
Teresa Kim Im-i	1811		1846		
Matthew Gam Van Le	1812		1847		
Vincentia Gerose	1784		1847		
Blessed Dominic Barberi	1792		1849		
Blessed Lodovico Pavoni	1784		1849		
Blessed Marie-Rose Durocher	1811		1849		
Vincent Pallotti			1850		
Blessed William Joseph Chaminade	1761		1850		
Augustine Schoeffler	1822		1851		
Blessed Anne Mary Javouhey	1779		1851		
Blessed Emilie Tavernier Gamelin	1800		1851		
Emily de Rodat	1787		1852		
John Louis Bonnard	1824		1852		
Rose Philippine Duchesne	1769		1852		
Blessed Theresa-Eustochium Verzeri	1801		1852		
Gaspard Bertoni	1777		1853		
Philip Minh			1853		
Blessed Maria Rafols	1781		1853		
Joaquina Vedruna de Mas	1783		1854		
Joseph Luu			1854		
Andrew Nam-Thuong			1855		
Andrew Thong Kim Nguyen	1790		1855		
John Baptist Mazzucconi	1825		1855		
Blessed Francisca Ana Cirer Carbonell	1781		1855		
Blessed Michael Ghebre (Mikael Gabra)			1855		
Agnes Cao Guiying	1833		1856		
Auguste Chapdelaine	1814		1856		
Emily de Vialar	1797		1856		
Lawrence Bai Xiaoman	1821		1856		
Lawrence Huong Van Nguyen	1802		1856		
Blessed Lawrence PeMan			1856		
Blessed Lawrence Salvi	1782		1856		
Blessed Rosalie Rendu	1786		1856		
Dominic Savio	1842		1857		
Jose Diaz Sanjurjo	1818		1857		Bishop of Central Tonkin
Michael Hy-Dinh-Ho	1808		1857		
Paul Tinh			1857		
Peter Van			1857		
Blessed Caterina Cittadini	1801		1857		
Blessed Elisabetta Sanna (full name Elisabetta Sanna Porcu)	1788	Codrongianos	1857	Rome	
Agatha Lin	1817		1858		
Dominic (Ha Trong) Mau	1808		1858		
Francis Trung Van Tran	1825		1858		
Melchor Garcia Sampedro	1821		1858		
Jerome Lu Tingmei			1858		
Blessed Benedicta Cambiagio Frassinello	1791		1858		
Blessed Lawrence Wang	1811		1858		
Nimatullah Youssef Kassab Al-Hardini	1808		1858		
Emmanuel Phung			1859		
John Mary Vianney	1786		1859		
Paul Hanh			1859		
Paul Loc Van Le	1830		1859		
Peter Quy and Emmanuel Phung			1859		
John Neumann	1811		1860		Bishop of Philadelphia
Joseph Thi Dang Le	1825		1860		
Justin de Jacobis	1800		1860		Bishop of Massawa
Martyrs of Damascus			1860		
Peter Francis Neron	1818		1860		
Blessed Elisabetta Vendramini	1790		1860		
Blessed Emmanuel Ruiz and companions	1804		1860		
Gaetano Errico	1791		1860		
Blessed John Nepomucen	1777		1860		
Blessed Peter Friedhofen	1819		1860		
Etienne-Theodore Cluenot	1802		1861		
Eugene de Mazenod	1782		1861		
Ignatius Delgado, Vincent Liem, Francis Gil, and companions	1745		1861		
John Hoan			1861		
Jose Khang Duy Nguyen	1832		1861		
Joseph Khang			1861		
Joseph Zhang Wenlan, Paul Chen Changpin, John Baptist Luo Tingying, and Martha Wang Luo			1861		
Matthew Dac Nguyen			1861		
Théophane Vénard	1829		1861		
Trinh Doan			1861		
Valentine Berrio-Ochoa			1861		
Blessed Mancius of the Holy Cross			1861		
Blessed Pierre Bonhomme	1803		1861		
Bénilde Romançon	1805		1862		
Dominic Mao Trong Ha and Companions			1862		
Dominican Martyrs of Vietnam	1856		1862		
Gabriel of Our Lady of Sorrows			1862		
Peter Dung Van Dinh			1862		
Peter Thuan			1862		
Vincent Duong			1862		
Blessed Jean-Pierre Néel and companions	1832		1862		
Lucy Yi Zhenmei			1862		
Michael Garicoits	1797		1863		
Blessed Jacques-Désiré Laval	1803	Croth, France	1864	Port Louis, Mauritius	
Madeleine Sophie Barat	1779		1865		
Maria Micaela Desmaisieres	1809		1865		
Blessed Adolf Kolping	1813		1865		
Blessed Paula Cerioli	1816		1865		
Andrew Dung-Lac and Companions			1866		
Bartholomew Chong Mun-ho	1801		1866		
Francis Maria of Camporosso	1804	Camporosso	1866	Genoa	Called Padre Santo
John Baptist Chon Chang-un	1810		1866		
John Baptist Nam Chong-Sam	1816		1866		
Joseph Cho Yun-ho	1847		1866		
Mark Chong Ui-bae	1794		1866		
Peter Cho Hwa-so			1866		
Peter Ch'oe Hyong	1813		1866		
Simeon Berneux	1814		1866		
Henri Dorie	1839		1866		
Antoine Daveluy	1818		1866		
Mary de Mattias	1805		1866		
Blessed Peter Ryou Tiyeng-Rioul	1816		1866		
Thomas Son Cha-son	1838		1866		
John Yi Yun-il	1822		1867		
Paul Chong Hasang and Companions	1839		1867		
Blessed Francis Xavier Seelos	1819		1867		
Peter Julian Eymard, priest, founder of Congregation and Servants of the Blessed Sacrament	1811		1868		
Blessed Marie-Dominique Brun Brabantini	1789		1868		
Blessed Mary of Saint Euphrasia Pelletier	1796		1868		
Narcisa de Jesus Martillo Moran	1832		1869		
Anthony Mary Claret	1807		1870		
Clelia Barbieri	1847		1870		
Blessed Edmund Bojanowski	1814		1871		
Kuriakose Elias Chavara	1805		1871		Founder of Carmelites of Mary Immaculate and Congregation of the Mother of Carmel
Blessed Frézal Tardieu	1814	Chasseradès, Kingdom of France	1871	Paris, [France	Priest and martyr of the Paris Commune
Blessed Henri Planchat	1823	Bourbon-Vendée, Kingdom of France	1871	Paris, France	Priest and martyr of the Paris Commune
Blessed Ladislas Radigue	1823	Saint-Patrice-du-Désert, Kingdom of France	1871	Paris, France	Priest and martyr of the Paris Commune
Blessed Marcelino Rouchouze	1810	Saint-Julien-en-Genevois, France	1871	Paris, France	Priest and martyr of the Paris Commune
Blessed Polycarpe Tuffier	1807	Le Malzieu, France	1871	Paris, France	Priest and martyr of the Paris Commune
Blessed Francisco Palau	1811		1872		
Blessed Wincenty Lewoniuk and companions			1874		
Catherine Laboure	1806		1876		
Maria Rosa Molas y Vallve	1815		1876		
Blessed Federico Albert	1820	Turin	1876	Turin	
Blessed Marie-Therese Haze	1782		1876		
Placide Viel	1815		1877		
Blessed Mariam Bawardy	1846		1878		
Blessed Mother Mary of Jesus (Emilie d'Oultremont d'Hooghvorst)	1818		1878		
Blessed Pius IX	1792		1878		Pope
Bernadette Soubirous			1879		
Blessed Anthony Chevrier	1825		1879		
Jeanne Jugan	1792		1879		
Blessed Margaret Bays	1815		1879		
Blessed Marie-Therese of Jesus	1797		1879		
Blessed Marcantonio Durando	1801		1880		
Blessed Pauline von Mallinckrodt	1817		1881		
Blessed Jacinto Vera Durán	1813	Santa Catarina, Brazil	1881	Pan de Azúcar, Uruguay	First bishop of Montevideo
Paula Frassinetti	1809		1882		
Blessed Annunciata Cocchetti	1800		1882		
Blessed Martha Le Bouteiller	1816		1883		
Blessed Mercedes de Jesús Molina	1828		1883		
Luigi Scrosoppi	1804		1884		
Blessed Marie De Jesus Deluil-Martiny	1841		1884		
Adolphus Ludigo-Mkasa			1885		
Bruno Seronkuma			1885		
Dionysius Sebuggwao			1885		
Mary Di Rosa	1813		1885		
Blessed Louise Therese de Montaignac de Chauvance	1820		1885		
Blessed Ludovico of Casoria	1814		1885		
Blessed Maria del Transito Cabanillas	1821		1885		
Blessed Thérèse Couderc	1805		1885		
Achilleus Kewanuka			1886		
Ambrose Kibuka			1886		
Anatole Kiriggwajjo			1886		
Andrew Kaggwa			1886		
Athanasius Badzekuketta			1886		
Gonzaga Gonza			1886		
Gyavire			1886		
James Buzabalio			1886		
John Maria Muzeyi			1886		
Joseph Mukasa			1886		
Luke Banabakiutu			1886		
Mary-Joseph Rosello	1811		1886		
Matiya Mulumba (Mathias Murumba)			1886		
Mbaga Tuzinde			1886		
Mugagga			1886		
Mukasa Kiriwawanyu			1886		
Noe Mawaggali			1886		
Pontian Ngondwe			1886		
Blessed Kizito			1886		
Blessed Maria Encarnacion Rosal	1820		1886		
Charles Lwanga and companions, Martyrs of Uganda			1887		
John Mary Mzec			1887		
Maria Soledad (Maria Desolata)	1826		1887		
Blessed Clare Bosatta of Pianello	1858		1887		
Blessed Mary Catherine of Saint Rose (Constantia Troiani)	1813		1887		
John Bosco	1815		1888		
Blessed Ann Michelotti	1843		1888		
Blessed Francis Faa of Bruno	1825		1888		
Blessed Giacomo Cusmano	1834		1888		
Blessed Giovanni Antonio Farina	1803		1888		
Blessed Marie-Therese Scherer	1825		1888		
Paula Montal Fornes	1799		1889		
Damien of Molokai (Damien Joseph de Veuster)	1840		1889		
Blessed Gaetana Sterni	1827		1889		
Blessed Marie-Therese de Soubiran	1835		1889		
John Henry Newman	1801	London, England	1890	Edgbaston, England	Cardinal-Deacon of San Giorgio in Velabro
Blessed Arnold Rèche	1838		1890		
Blessed Innocent of Berzo	1844		1890		
Blessed Maria Repetto	1807		1890		
Blessed Marie Anne Blondin	1809		1890		
Blessed Tommaso Maria Fusco	1831		1891		
Antonio Maria Pucci	1819		1892		
Blessed Augusto Czartoryski	1858		1893		
Blessed Ferdinand Mary Baccilieri	1821		1893		
Charles of Mount Argus (John Andrew Houben)	1821		1893		
Blessed Mary Joseph Naval Girbes (Josepha Naval Girbés)	1820		1893		
Agostina Livia Pietrantoni	1864		1894		
Conrad Birndorfer of Parzham	1818		1894		
Caterina Volpicelli	1839		1894		
Blessed Joseph Benedict Dusmet	1818		1894		
Blessed Marie-Henry Dominic	1829		1894		
Blessed Victoria Rosoamanarivo	1848		1894		
Joseph Marello	1844		1895		Bishop of Acqui
Blessed Salvator Lilli and 7 companions	1853		1895		
Blessed Sigmund Felix Felinski	1822		1895		Bishop of Warsaw
Enrique de Ossó i Cervelló	1840	Kingdom of Spain	1896	Kingdom of Spain	
Vincentia Maria Lopez y Vicuña	1847	Cascante, Spain	1896	Madrid, Spain	
Blessed James Berthieu	1838		1896		
Blessed Zefirino Agostini	1813		1896		
Teresa of Jesus Jornet e Ibars	1843		1897		
Therese de Lisieux (Therese of the Child Jesus)	1873		1897		
Blessed Giuseppe Tovini	1841		1897		
Sharbel Makhluf	1828		1898		
Marie-Eugenie of Jesus	1817		1898		
Blessed Kaspar Stanggassinger	1871		1899		
Blessed Maria Droste zu Vischering	1863		1899		
Blessed Angela Truszkowska, foundress of the Felician Sisters	1825		1899		
Alberic Crescitelli			1900		
Gregory Grassi, Francis Fogolla, and companions			1900		
Leonardo Murialdo	1828		1900		
Modeste Andlauer and Rémy Isoré			1900		
Blessed Anna Rosa Gattorno	1831		1900		
Blessed Anthony Fantosat			1900		
Blessed Eugenia Ravasco	1845		1900		
Blessed Franciscan Martyrs of China			1900		
86 martyrs of the Boxer rebellion in China			1900		
Leo Ignatius Mangin and Paul Denn			1900		
Blessed Luigi Monti	1825		1900		
Blessed Helena Stollenwerk	1852	Aachen, German Confederation	1900	Steyl, Netherlands	co-foundress of the Missionary Sisters Servants of the Holy Spirit
Blessed Rafaela Ybarra de Vilallonga	1843		1900		

== See also ==
- Christianity in the 19th century
