= Catholic Persecution of 1866 =

Mass persecution of Korean Catholics

The Catholic Persecution of 1866, known in Korea as the Byeong-in Persecution (Korean: 병인박해; Hanja: 丙寅迫害), refers to the large-scale persecution of Catholics that took place in Joseon in 1866 under the regency of Heungseon Daewongun during the third year of King Gojong 's reign. The persecution lasted for six years until 1872, during which more than 8,000 laypeople and many missionaries from the Paris Foreign Missions Society were executed.

Heungseon Daewongun originally had no antipathy toward Catholicism, so he had no plans to suppress it. In fact, he even tried to block Russia's southward expansion policy by seeking help from France through French missionaries. However, he implemented a policy of persecution of Catholicism in order to prevent his political position from being shaken by internal and external changes.

The anti-Catholic policy, which began in the spring of 1866, became more severe after the General Sherman Incident (August 1866), the Byeong-in Yangyo (October 1866), and was further entrenched when in 1868 German merchant Ernst Oppert attempted to take hostage the bones of the Daewongun's father in order to force him to open Korea to trade; and even further so after the 1871 American attack of Gwanghwado, all of which strengthened the Heungseon Daewongun government's isolationist and anti-Catholic policies.

== Causes ==
=== Daewongun and Catholicism ===
In 1831, the Vatican designated Joseon as an independent diocese and in 1837, appointed Laurent-Joseph-Marius Imbert (who had been serving in China) to be Vicar Apostolic of the Catholic Church in Korea. In Joseon he joined Fr. Philibert Maubant, and Fr. Jacques Honorẻ Chastan) to spread Catholicism, mainly among the fallen yangban. However, the yangban, the ministries and the ministers were concerned that Christianity was connected to the imperialism of the Western powers, so they banned Catholicism, and in 1839, they launched one of the persecutions of Catholicism, the Gihae Persecution, executing three French Catholic priests (Imbert, Maubant & Chastan) on September 21, 1839. However, despite this suppression, Catholicism continued to expand.

Heungseon Daewongun himself originally had no intention of suppressing Catholicism, and he had no antipathy towards it. Rather, he thought of interacting with Western powers such as France via Catholicism, a Western learning introduced from the West. Catholicism was also the religion of his wife, Lady Min of Yeoheungbu. One of the reasons why Heungseon Daewongun tolerated Catholicism was that he wanted to use Catholicism to broker a relationship with France and block Imperial Russia from advancing south. However, he had no choice but to deny Catholicism due to external events in Qing. This was because news was heard that the Qing Dynasty was suppressing Catholicism following the occupation of Beijing by British and French forces (the Second Opium War. Thus, since Joseon was a vassal state of Qing, Heungseon Daewongun Lee Ha-eung had no choice but to also deny Catholicism.

=== Frustration with Russia's southward policy ===
In 1864 (the first year of King Gojong's reign), when Russians came to Gyeongheungbu and demanded to trade, government officials including the Daewongun were surprised and embarrassed, but were helpless in coming up with countermeasures. On the other hand, some Catholics took a keen interest in this incident, thought of countermeasures on their own, and suggested them to the Daewongun. That is, if they could form a tripartite alliance of Korea, France, and England, they would be able to block Russia's southward expansion policy, and they thought that if this was accomplished, they would also be able to obtain religious freedom . Thus, they received a request from the Daewongun for a meeting with French missionaries. However, the request was not responded to.

== Prince Daewongun's change of position ==
The French Catholic missionaries, including Bishop Berneux, were not interested in politics and thus had no diplomatic value, while the Russians' border crossing and trade demands, which had been such important issues in the court, came to be thought of as unfounded concerns as time passed. The ruling class also opposed the expansion of Catholicism, which they regarded as " a heretical teaching that advocated heaven and hell and tyrannized the people," and furthermore, due to the Catholics' slow actions, incompetent mediation, and irresponsible remarks, rumors that "even Unhyeongung Palace is frequented by Catholics" spread throughout the capital, leading the government of Prince Daewongun to believe that the hoped-for results of this policy were not achievable.

At the same time, the high-ranking officials including Queen Dowager Jo, also began to criticize the Catholics' machinations. At that time, the persecution of Catholics was again becoming an issue in the Qing Dynasty because of its having been invaded by Western Powers, and Prince Daewongun reached a point where he did not want to take the risk of jeopardizing his political base. Thus, he gave up all expectations of Catholics and decided that it would be best to follow public opinion, and he changed his policy from acquiescence to persecution. Accordingly, an order was made for the persecution of Catholics .

== Progression of events ==
=== Persecution of Catholicism ===
In January 1866 (3rd year of King Gojong's reign), when the Daewongun's decree to suppress Catholicism was promulgated, 9 out of 12 French missionaries were executed, and over 8,000 Catholics in Korea were executed in just a few months. Countless women and children fled to the mountains, were chased away, or died of disease or starvation. Many non-believers were persecuted. Three French priests, including Daveluy, were beheaded in Suyeong, Chungcheong Province.

Large numbers of Catholics renounced their faith; Catholic books were confiscated and burned; and crosses and statues of the Virgin Mary were trampled. In October 1866, the Byeong-in Yangyo (the French expedition to Korea) occurred, and in May 1868, the German Ernst Oppert robbed the tomb of Prince Namyeon, the father of Heungseon Daewongun, and the persecution intensified. The oppression of Catholicism continued for six years, and the areas where the oppression was severe were Hapjeong in Seoul, Ongjin, Pungcheon, Jangyeon in Hwanghae-do, Naepo in South Chungcheong Province, and around Haemi-myeon in Seosan.

=== Martyrdom of Jeoldusan ===
Father Ridel (1830–1884), who escaped Joseon to escape the persecution of Daewongun, reported the news of the martyrdom of nine French missionaries to Admiral Roze, the commander of the Far East Fleet in Tianjin. Roze refused the Qing Dynasty's offer of mediation and led three warships to retaliate with force, resulting in the Byeong-in Yangyo. The warships passed by Mapo ferry terminal (Yanghwajin) and Seogang around September 26, then attacked Ganghwa Island and plundered before withdrawing in November. Furious at this incident, Heungseon Daewongun said, "It is right to wash the land that Western barbarians have defiled with the blood of Western scholars," and he set up an execution ground on Jamdubong next to Yanghwanaru and executed Catholics. Thousands of Catholics died here. After that, it was called Jeoldusan, (Korean: 절두산; Hanja: 切頭山; lit. 'decapitation mountain'). It is said that the severed heads were thrown into the Han River, and the heads formed mountains and the water of the Han River turned blood red.

== Haemi Martyrdom (Buried Alive) ==
In a valley called 'Yeosutgol' in Josan-ri, Haemi-myeon, Seosan-si, Chungcheongnam-do, about 1,000 Catholics were executed or buried alive. At the time, the Haemi Garrison was in charge of identifying and punishing Catholics, so Catholics captured in the Haemi-hyeon government office area spanning Chungcheong-do and Pyeongtaek, Gyeonggi-do were taken to Haemi-eupseong. They were imprisoned and executed outside its west gate. When the number became too large, they were buried alive in large holes dug along the Haemicheon Stream outside the town wall for the convenience of disposing of the bodies. This fact became known through the investigation and excavation by Father Barraux of Seosan Cathedral in 1935.

== List of Martyrs ==
Number	Name and Christian name	Employment/Title	Date of martyrdom	Method of execution
80	Yoo Jeong-ryul Peter	Secretary	February 17, 1866	
81	Berne Simons	Bishop	March 7, 1866	Military execution
82	Lampert Justo	Bride	March 7, 1866	Military execution
83	Dory Henryco	Bride	March 7, 1866	Military execution
84	Beaulieu Louis	Bride	March 7, 1866	Military execution
85	John the Baptist, Nam Jong-sam		March 7, 1866	Beheaded
86	John the Baptist in Battlefield	Merchant	March 9, 1866	Beheaded
87	Peter Choi Hyung	President?	March 9, 1866	Beheaded
88	Justice Bae Marco	President?	March 11, 1866	Military execution
89	Woo Se-young Alexio	Interpreter	March 11, 1866	Military execution
90	dablüe antonio	Bishop	March 30, 1866	Hanged
91	Wiang Martino Luca	bride	March 30, 1866	Hanged
92	Ometre Peter	bride	March 30, 1866	Hanged
93	Joseph of the Long Cycle	President?	March 30, 1866	Hanged
94	Hwang Seok-du Luca	President?	March 30, 1866	Hanged
95	Sonjasun Thomas	Peasant	May 18, 1866	Hanged
96	Jeong Moon-ho Bartholomew	reeve	December 13, 1866	Decapitation
97	Peter the Harmonist	peasant	December 13, 1866	Decapitation
98	Peter Son Seon-ji	President?	December 13, 1866	Decapitation
99	Lee Myung Seo Peter	Peasant	December 13, 1866	decapitation
100	Han Jae Kwon Joseph	President?	December 13, 1866	Decapitation
101	Gardener Peter	Peasant	December 13, 1866	Decapitation
102	Joseph Jo Yoon-ho	Peasant	December 23, 1866	Decapitation
103	Lee Yoon- il John	President?	January 21, 1867	Decapitation

A partial list of the 103 martyrs is given at Korean Martyrs#Andrew Kim Taegon, Paul Chong Hasang, and 101 Companions,

== Summary ==
In Joseon, nine out of 8,000 Catholics and 12 French missionaries were executed, but a survivor, Father Ridel escaped to Qing and delivered news of the persecution to Pierre Gustave Roze, commander of the French fleet stationed in Tianjin, which led to the Byeong-in Yangyo that occurred in November of that year.

The Byeongin Persecution was a famous event even to Westerners, to the extent that British geographer Isabella Bird Bishop described Heungseon Daewongun in her book " Korea and Her Neighbors" as the person who made Joseon a nation of martyrs through the martyrdom of Christians .

The persecution was occurred in four waves precipitated by different events. The first was in the spring of 1866, the second was from the summer to the fall of 1866, the third was in 1868, and the fourth was in 1871, resulting in a total of more than 8,000 martyrs. The third persecution in 1868 is sometimes called the Mujin Persecution, while the fourth in 1871 is sometimes called the Shinmi Persecution, but since both these were promoted by Daewongun, it is usual to include them in the Byeongin Persecution. Thus, the Byeongin Persecution does not simply refer to the persecution in 1866, the year of Byeongin, but rather to the persecutions during 1866 and of the following six years.
