= Korean Martyrs =

Christian victims of persecution in 19th-century Korea; some canonized in 1984

Saints and Blesseds Korean Martyrs
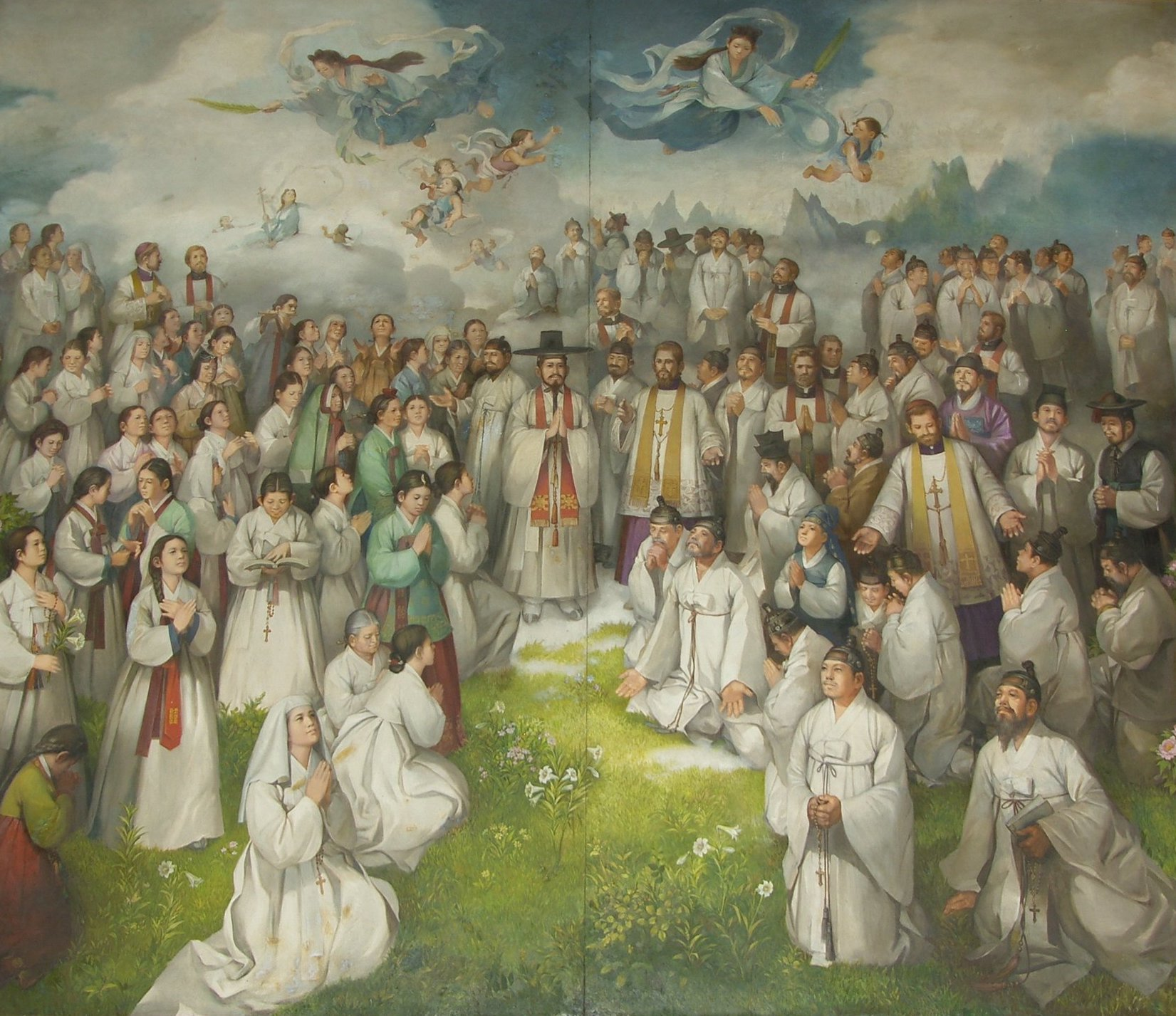
- Painting at Shrine of Saint Andrew Kim

Martyrs
- Born: Various
- Died: 1791–1888
- Venerated in: Catholic Church; Anglicanism
- Beatified: 5 July 1925, by Pope Pius XI; 6 October 1968, by Pope Paul VI; 16 August 2014, Seoul, South Korea by Pope Francis
- Canonized: 6 May 1984, Yeouido, Seoul, South Korea by Pope John Paul II
- Feast: 20 September; 9 May; 29 May

The Korean Martyrs were the victims of religious persecution against Catholics during the 19th century in Korea. Among them are 103 Saints and 124 Blesseds officially recognized by the Catholic Church.

== Overview ==
There were five main sets of persecutions against Christians in nineteenth-century Korea:

- Catholic Persecution of 1791
- Catholic Persecution of 1801
- Catholic Persecution of 1839
- Catholic Persecution of 1846
- Catholic Persecution of 1866

Between 8,000–10,000 Korean Christians were killed during this period. In May 1984, 103 Catholics were canonised en masse, including the first Korean Catholic priest, Andrew Kim Taegon, who was executed by sword in 1846.

In 2014, Paul Yun Ji-Chung and 123 companions were declared "Venerable" on 7 February 2014 and on 16 August 2014. They were beatified by Pope Francis during the Asian Youth Day in Gwanghwamun Plaza in Seoul. They further moved to beatify Catholics who were killed by North Korean communists during the Korean War.

== Background ==
At the end of the eighteenth century, Korea was ruled by the Joseon Dynasty. It was a society based on Confucianism and its hierarchical, class relationships. There was a small minority of privileged scholars and nobility while the majority were commoners paying taxes, providing labor, and manning the military, all above a slave class.

When scholars first introduced Christianity to Korea, ordinary people flocked to the new religion. The new believers called themselves Chonju Kyo Udul, literally "Friends of the Teaching of God of Heaven". The term "friends" was the only term in the Confucian understanding of relationships which implied equality.

== History ==
During the early seventeenth century, Christian literature written in Chinese was imported from China to Korea. The Catholic ideas espoused in them were debated and denounced as heterodoxy as early as 1724. In 1777, Christian literature obtained from Jesuits in China led educated Korean Christians to study the faith. At this point some Koreans started to be converted to Catholicism.

When a Chinese priest managed to secretly enter the country a dozen years later, he found 4,000 Catholics, none of whom had ever seen a priest. The Catholic communities were led almost entirely by educated laypeople from the aristocracy, as they were the only ones who could read the books that were written in Hanja.

The community sent a delegation on foot to Beijing, 750 miles away, to ask the city's bishop for their own bishops and priests. Eventually, two Chinese priests were sent, but their ministry was short-lived, and another forty years passed before the Paris Foreign Mission Society began its work in Korea with the arrival of Father Maubant in 1836. Paul Chong Hasang, Augustine Yu Chin-gil and Charles Cho Shin-chol had made several visits to Beijing to find ways of introducing missionaries into Korea.

Since the Sinhae persecution of 1791–1801, there had been no priest to care for the Catholic community. Serious dangers awaited the missionaries who dared to enter Korea. The bishops and priests who confronted this danger, as well as the laypeople who aided and sheltered them, were in constant threat of losing their lives.

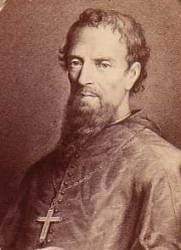
Saint Laurent-Marie-Joseph Imbert, M.E.P.

Bishop Laurent Imbert and ten other French missionaries were the first Paris Foreign Missions Society priests to enter Korea. During the daytime, they stayed in hiding, but at night they traveled about on foot attending to the spiritual needs of the faithful and administering the sacraments. The first Korean Catholic priest, Andrew Kim Taegŏn, who was trained in Macau, succeeded in entering Korea as a missionary. However, thirteen months after his ordination he was put to death by the sword in 1846 at the age of 26. He is now recognised as the patron saint of Korean clergy.

The idea of Catholics gathering in one place with no distinction on the basis of class were perceived to undermine "hierarchical Confucianism", the ideology which held the state together. The new learning was seen to be subversive of the establishment and this gave rise to systematic suppression and persecution. Official documents detail trials and the sentences. There were four major persecutions; the last one was in 1866, at which time there were only 20,000 Catholics in Korea (other Christian denominations did not enter Korea until sometime later). The vast majority of the martyrs were laypeople.

== Recognition ==
More than 10,000 martyrs died in persecutions which extended over more than one hundred years. Of all these martyrs, seventy-nine were beatified in 1925. Twenty-four others were beatified on 6 October 1968. They had died in the persecutions of 1839 (Ki-hae persecution), 1846 (Pyong-o persecution) and 1866 (Pyong-in persecution). All together, 103 martyrs were canonized by Pope John Paul II on 6 May 1984. In breaking tradition, the ceremony did not take place in Rome but Seoul. Their feast day is September 20.

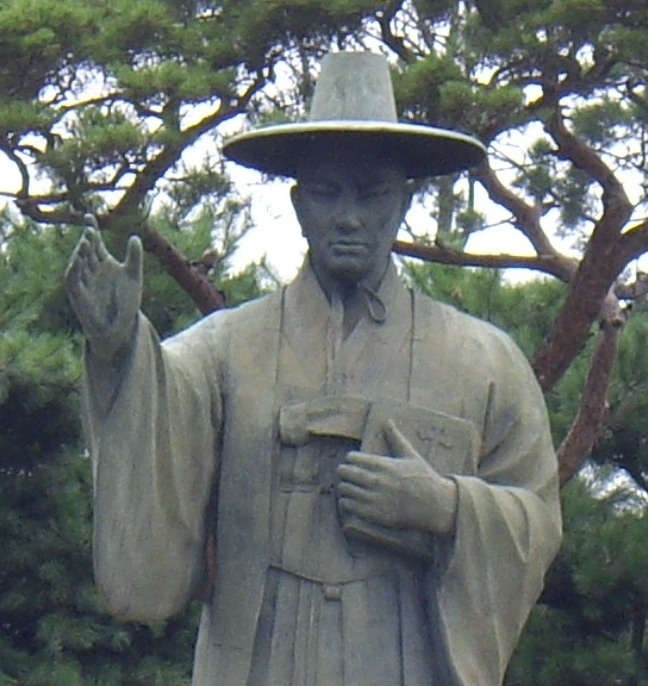
Kim Taegon Statue in Jeoldu-san

Andrew Kim Taegŏn wrote to his parish as he awaited his execution with a group of twenty persons:

My dear brothers and sisters, know this: Our Lord Jesus Christ upon descending into the world took innumerable pains upon and constituted the holy Church through his own passion and increases it through the passion of its faithful... Now, however, some fifty or sixty years since the holy Church entered into our Korea, the faithful suffer persecutions again. Even today persecution rages, so that many of our friends of the same faith, among whom I am myself, have been thrown into prison... Since we have formed one body, how can we not be saddened in our innermost hearts? How can we not experience the pain of separation in our human faculties? However, as Scripture says, God cares for the least hair of our heads, and indeed he cares with his omniscience; therefore, how can persecution be considered as anything other than the command of God, or his prize, or precisely his punishment?... We are twenty here, and thanks be to God all are still well. If anyone is killed, I beg you not to forget his family. I have many more things to say, but how can I express them with pen and paper? I make an end to this letter. Since we are now close to the struggle, I pray you to walk in faith, so that when you have finally entered into Heaven, we may greet one another. I leave you my kiss of love.

In the early 1870s, Father Claude-Charles Dallet compiled a comprehensive history of the Catholic Church in Korea, largely from the manuscripts of martyred Bishop Antoine Daveluy. The Korean Martyrs were known for their staunchness, sincerity, and number of their converts. An English lawyer and sinologist Edward Harper Parker observed that:

Coreans [sic], unlike Chinese and Japanese, make the most staunch and devoted converts... The Annamese [Vietnamese] make better converts than either Chinese or Japanese, whose tricky character, however, they share; but they are gentler and more sympathetic; they do not possess the staunch masculinity of the Coreans.

According to Ernst Oppert,

An observation, founded upon many years' experience, may not be out of place here, and that is, that among all Asiatic nationalities there is probably none more inclined to be converted to Christianity than the Corean [sic]... He becomes a Christian from conviction, not from any mercenary motives.

Bishop and martyr Simeon François Berneux wrote,

The Corean [sic] possesses the most perfect dispositions for receiving the faith. Once convinced, he accepts and attaches himself to it, in spite of all sacrifices it may cost him.

The priest Francis Goldie stated,

Certainly few countries, if any, have to tell of such a painful apostolate, or of one which has had such success. Japan alone in later days can boast a martyrology at all to compare with that of Corea [sic] in the number of the slain, or in the heroism of those who died for Christ.

== Individual martyrs ==
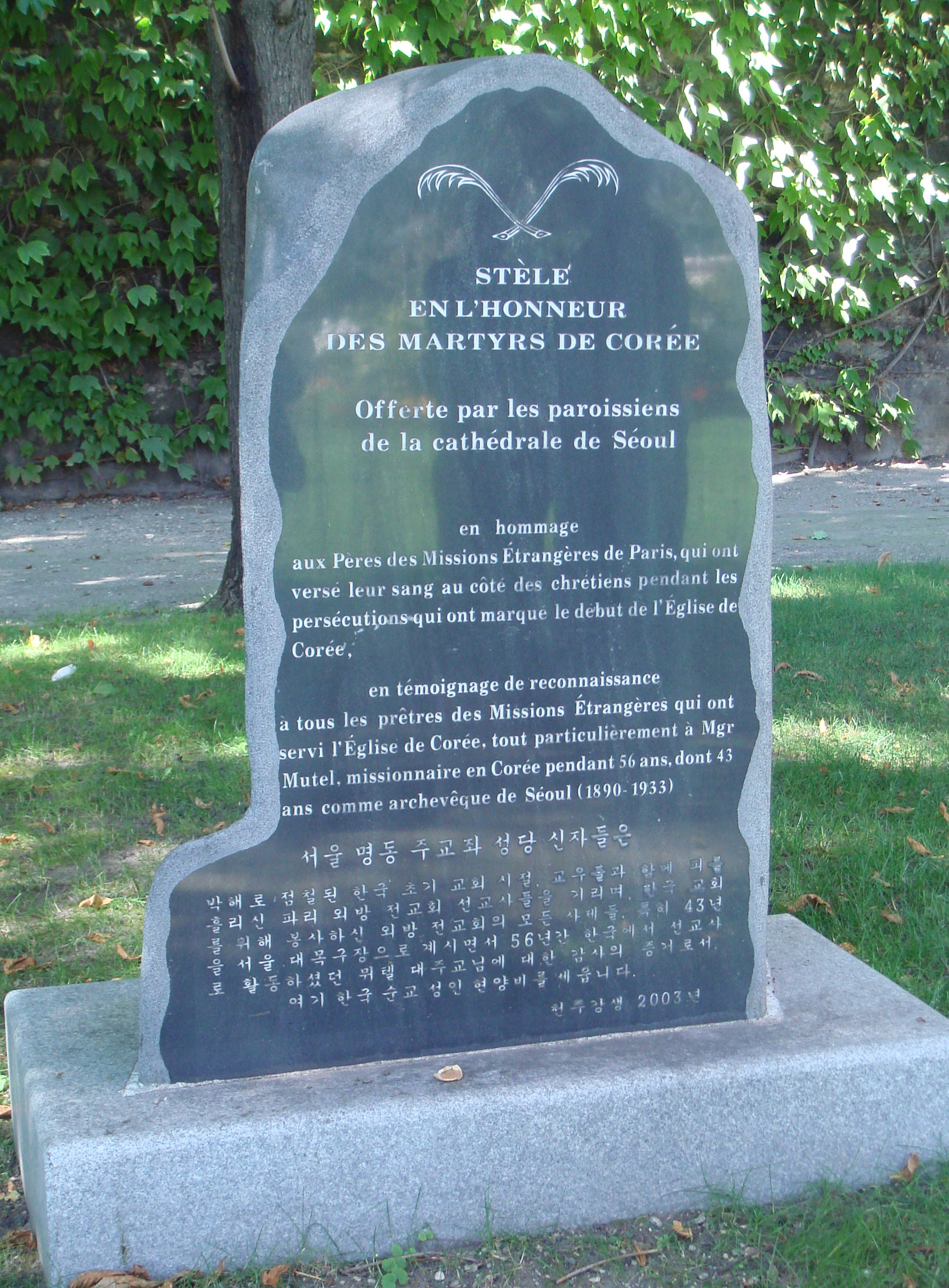
Stela to the members of the Paris Foreign Missions Society who were martyred in Korea

The Christian community first began to take shape when Yi Seung-hun started to study Christian doctrine by himself and was eventually baptized and given the name Peter in 1784. Because of their belief in the Christian God, the first Korean Christians were persecuted repeatedly, rejected by their families, and suffered a loss of their social rank. Despite persecutions, the faith continued to spread.

The Christian community in Korea was given the assistance of two Chinese priests, but their ministry was short-lived, and another forty years passed before the Paris Foreign Missions Society began its work in Korea with the arrival of Father Mauban in 1836. A delegation was selected and sent to Beijing on foot, 750 miles, to ask the Bishop of Beijing to send them bishops and priests.

The same appeal was made to the Pope in Rome. Serious dangers awaited the missionaries who dared to enter Korea. The bishops and priests who confronted this danger, as well as the lay Christians who aided and sheltered them, were in constant threat of losing their lives.

Until the granting of religious liberty in Korea in 1886, there were many "disciples who shed their blood, in imitation of Christ Our Lord, and who willingly submitted to death, for the salvation of the world" (Lumen Gentium, 42). Among those who died, and were later named as martyrs, were eleven priests and ninety-two lay people who would be canonized as saints.

Bishop Laurent Imbert and ten other French missionaries were the first Paris Foreign Mission Society priests to enter Korea and to embrace a different culture for the love of God. During the daytime, they stayed in hiding, but at night they travelled about on foot attending to the spiritual needs of the faithful and administering the sacraments.

=== Andrew Kim Taegon, Paul Chong Hasang, and 101 Companions ===
The first Korean priest, Andrew Kim Taegon, found a way to make the difficult task of entering Korea as a missionary from Macau. Thirteen months after his ordination he was put to death by the sword when he was 25 years old.

Paul Chong Hasang, Augustine Yu Chin-gil and Charles Cho Shin-chol had made several visits to Beijing to find new ways of introducing missionaries into Korea and a bishop and ten priests from the Paris Foreign Missions Society arrived in the country for the first time since 1801.

Among the martyrs honored were fifteen women, including the two sisters, Agnes Kim Hyo-ju and Columba Kim Hyo-im. These women, in an era when Christian religious life was still unknown in Korea, lived in community and cared for the sick and the poor. John Yi Kwang-hyol died a martyr's death after having lived a life of celibacy in consecrated service to the Church.

Some of the other martyrs who were canonized that day included:

- Damien Nam Myong-hyok and Maria Yi Yon-hui
- John Nam Chong-sam, though of high social rank, was a model of justice, chastity and poverty;
- John Pak Hu-jae who, after he lost his parents in the persecutions, learned to survive by making straw sandals;
- Peter Kwon Tug-in who devoted himself to meditation;
- Anna Pak Agi who, although she did not have a deep grasp of Christian doctrine, was wholly devoted to Jesus and Mary;
- Peter Yu Tae-chol who confessed his faith and died a martyr at the age of 13 years old.
- Peter Yi Hoyong
- Protasius Chong Kukbo
- Magdalena Kim Obi
- Anna Pak Agi
- Agatha Yi Sosa
- Agatha Kim Agi
- Augustine Yi Kwanghon
- Barbara Han Agi
- Lucia Pak Huisun
- Damian Nam Myonghyok
- Peter Kwon Tugin
- Joseph Chang Songjib
- Barbara Kim
- Barbara Yi
- Rosa Kim Nosa
- Martha Kim Songim
- Teresa Yi Maeim
- Anna Kim Changgum
- John Baptist Yi Kwang-nyol
- Magdalena Yi Yonghui
- Lucia Kim Nusia
- Maria Won Kwiim
- Maria Pak Kunagi
- Barbara Kwon Hui
- Johannes Pak Hujae
- Barbara Yi Chonghui
- Maria Yi Yonhui
- Agnes Kim Hyochu
- Francis Choe Kyonghwan
- Laurent-Marie-Joseph Imbert
- Pierre-Philibert Maubant
- Jacques-Honoré Chastan
- Paul Chong Hasang
- Augustine Yu Chinkil
- Magdalena Ho Kyeim
- Sebastian Nam Igwan
- Kim Juliette
- Agatha Chon Kyonghyob
- Charles Cho Shinchol
- Ignatius Kim Chejun
- Magdalena Pak Pongson
- Perpetua Hong Kimju
- Columba Kim Hyoim
- Lucia Kim Kopchu
- Catherine Yi
- Madeleine Cho
- Peter Yu Tae-chol
- Cecilia Yu Sosa
- Barbara Choe Yong-i
- Magdalena Han Yongi
- Peter Choe Changhub
- Benedicta Hyong Kyongnyon
- Elizabeth Chong Chonghye
- Barbara Ko Suni
- Magdalena Yi Yongdok
- Teresa Kim Im-i
- Agatha Yi
- Stephen Min Kuk-ka
- Andrew Chong Hwagyong
- Paul Ho Hyob
- Augustine Pak Chongwon
- Peter Hong Pyongju
- Magdalena Son Sobyok
- Agatha Yi Kyong-i
- Maria Yi Indok
- Agatha Kwon Chin-i
- Paul Hong Yongju
- Johannes Yi Munu
- Barbara Choe Yongi
- Anthony Kim Songu
- Andrew Kim Taegon
- Charles Hyon Songmun
- Peter Nam Kyongmun
- Lawrence Han Ihyong
- Susanna U Surim
- Joseph Im Chipek
- Teresa Kim Imi
- Agatha Yi Kannan
- Catherina Chong Choryom
- Peter Yu Chongnyul
- Siméon-François Berneux
- Simon-Marie-Just Ranfer de Bretenières
- Pierre-Henri Dorie
- Louis Beaulieu
- John Baptist Nam Chongsam
- John Baptist Chon Changun
- Peter Choe Hyong
- Mark Chong Uibae
- Alexis U Seyong
- Marie-Nicolas-Antoine Daveluy
- Martin-Luc Huin
- Pierre Aumaitre
- Joseph Chang Chugi
- Lucas Hwang Soktu
- Thomas Son Chasuhn
- Bartholomew Chong Munho
- Peter Cho Hwaso
- Peter Son Sonji
- Peter Yi Myongso
- Joseph Han Wonso
- Peter Chong Wonji
- Joseph Cho Yunho
- John Yi Yun-il

=== Paul Yun Jichung and 123 Companions ===
The 124 martyrs were beatified on August 16, 2014 in Seoul by Pope Francis during his visit to Korea.

Biography of major martyrs: Yun Ji-chung Paul (1759–1791). The first Chosun martyr killed for his Catholic faith, was born in 1759 to a noble family in Jinsan, Jeolla-do. Yun Ji-heon Francis, who was martyred during the Shinyu Persecution of 1801, was his younger brother.

In 1783, Yun passed the first state examination and learned about Catholicism for the first time through his cousin Jung Yak Yong John. After being baptized in 1787, he preached the Catholic doctrine to his mother, younger brother, and cousin Kwon Sang Yeon James. He also kept in touch with Yoo Hang Geom Augustine to keep up mission work.

In 1791, Bishop Gouvea of Beijing ordered a ban on traditional ancestral rites within his diocese. Yun Ji Chung and Kwon Sang Yeon, in accordance with the Church's commands, set their families ancestral tablets on fire. Chung's mother died the following year. She requested to receive a Catholic funeral which her son duly provided for her. These actions angered the royal family.

News of Yun's actions led to dispute in the royal court. In the end, Jeongjo backed the Noron faction push to oppress Catholicism and ordered the arrest of Yun and Kwon. The governor of Jinsan went to Yun's house and discovered the absence of the family's ancestral plates. At the time the pair were in hiding. Upon hearing that Yuns's uncle had been taken into custody they handed themselves into the authorities.

In the face of calls to renounce their Catholic faith the pair refused. The governor judged that getting them to abandon their religion was beyond him. They were sent to a government building in Jeonju. The pair continued to refuse apostasy despite interrogation and torture. An official report on the situation was delivered to the royal court. Opinion within the court was in favour of the death penalty. Jeongjo supported this view and ordered their execution. On the 8th of the December 1791 Yun and Kwon were beheaded.

This episode is referred to as the 'Jinsan incident'.

Fr. Jacob Zhou Wenmo (1752–1801): The first missionary priest to be dispatched to Chosun. Born in Suzhou, China in 1752, he lost his parents early in life and were raised by his grandmother. He became a priest as one of the first graduates at Beijing Archdiocese seminary. At that time, Bishop Gouvea in Beijing was planning to send a clergy to Chosun. He chose Father Ju, who had a strong faith and looked similar to Chosun people. After leaving Beijing in February 1794, Father Ju waited at Yodong area until the Amnokgang River froze enough to cross across. On the appointed date, he went to a town located on the border between China and Chosun to meet secret envoys sent from Chosun and entered Chosun on the night of December 24. Since then, Father Ju stayed at the house of a faithful Christian so that he could learn Hangul, the Korean alphabets. On Easter of 1795, he held a mass with the faithful for the first time. However, after his entry was revealed, he escaped to female President Kang Wan Sook (Colomba)'s house and continued to pray in many areas in secrecy. The number of the faithful increased to 10,000 after six years but as the Catholic Persecution of 1801 occurred and the faithful were forced to confess the location of Father Ju, he decided to surrender on March 11 of that year. On May 31, Father Ju was decapitated at Saenamteo area near Han River at the age of 49.

Yun Yoo Il Paul (1760–1795): A secret envoy from Beijing who helped missionary to enter Chosun. He was born in Yeoju, Kyungki-do in 1760. After moving to Yanggeun, he encountered Catholicism while studying under Kwon Chul Shin. He learned Catholic doctrine from Kwon Il Shin, the younger brother of Kwon Chul Shin, and became a Catholic. He then preached the doctrine to his family. In 1789, Yun Yoo Il was selected as a secret envoy by the church leaders to report the situation of Chosun church to Bishop Gouvea. He went to Beijing twice, in 1789 and in 1790. In 1791, Bishop Gouvea's plan to dispatch a priest failed and persecution took place in Chosun. Nonetheless, Yun Yoo Il continued to endeavor to dispatch a priest. In 1794, he finally succeeded in bringing Father Ju Mun Mo to Chosun. In 1795, he was arrested along with Ji Hwang (Sabas), Choi in Gil (Mathew). They were tortured to tell the location of Father Ju, but their strong endurance and wise response rather confused the persecutors. As a result, the three of them were beaten to death on June 28 of that year, when Yun Yoo Il was 35, Ji Hwang 28, and Choi in Gil 30.

Jeong Yak Jong Augustinus (1760–1801): The first Catholic lay theologian in Korea. In 1760, he was born into a family of scholars in Majae (current Neungnae-ri Joan-myeon, Namyangju-si Gyeonggi-go). He is the father of Jeong Chul Sang (Charles) (?-1801) who was beatified together with the 123 Blessed and St. Jeong Ha Sang Paul (martyred in 1839), who was declared saint in 1984. After learning Catholic doctrine from his older brother Jeong Yak Jeon in 1786, he moved to Yanggeon Bunwon (current Bunwon-ri, Namjeong-myeon, Gwangju-gun, Gyeonggi-go) to preached Catholic doctrine to his neighbors while participating in church activities. After Father Ju Mun Mo came in 1794, Jeong Yak Jong often visited Han Yang to help church work. He also wrote two easy Hangul textbooks called 'Jugyo-yoji' a Catechism in the Korean language and distributed them to Christians with Father Ju's approval. Later he became the first president of a layperson association called 'Myeongdo-hoe' which was organized by Father Ju. When persecution began in his hometown in 1800, Jeong Yak Jong and his family moved to Han Yang. However, the 1801Catholic Persecution began and Jeong Yak Jong was arrested. As he tried to preach doctrine to persecutors, he was decapitated at Seosomun, 15 days after he was arrested, on 8 April 1801. When he was martyred, he said "I'd rather die looking up at the sky than to die looking down at the ground" and was decapitated while looking up at the sky.

Kang Wan Sook Columba (1761–1801): Female leader of Chosun Catholics. In 1761, she was born to a concubine of a noble family in Naepo area in ChungCheong-do. She learned about Catholicism soon after she was married and followed Christianity by reading Catholic books. During the persecution in 1791, she was imprisoned while taking care of the imprisoned faithful. Kang Wan Sook guided her mother-in-law and her son from previous marriage (Hong Pil Joo Phillips, martyred in 1801) to become Catholics, but could not persuade her husband. Later, when her husband got a concubine, Kang Wan Sook and her husband lived separately. After hearing that the faithful in Han Yang are well-informed with Catholic doctrine, she moved to Han Yang with her mother-in-law and her son. She provided financial support to Christians who were working on recruiting a clergy and she was baptized by Father Ju Mun Mo. Father Ju appointed her as a female President to take care of the faithful. When a persecution in 1795 took place, she took advantage of the fact that persecutors cannot search a house owned by a woman and let Father Ju to take refuge in her house. Her house was also used for the faithful's assembly. On April 6, 1801, she helped Father Ju to escape while being arrested. Although persecutors tried to trace Father Ju's whereabouts through her, she refused to confess. On 2 July, she was decapitated outside Seosomun at age 40.

Yu Hang-geom Augustine (1756–1801). The priest of Ho Nam. He was born in 1756 in Chonam, Jeonju and became a Catholic soon after Catholicism was introduced to Korea in 1784. His sons Yu Jung-cheol John, Yu Mun-seok John, daughter-in-law Yi Sun-i Lutgarda and his nephew Yu Jung-seong Matthew were beatified along with Yu Hang-geom Augustine. He showed compassion and gave alms to poor neighbors as well as to his servants. Augustine Yu was appointed as pastor of Jeolla-do region in the spring of 1786, when the leaders of the Catholics held a meeting and appointed clergy at their own discretion. Afterwards, he returned to his hometown and celebrated Mass and administered the Sacraments to the faithful. However, after a while, the leaders of the Catholics understood that such an act was a sacrilege. As soon as this was brought to his attention, he stopped immediately. When the Persecution of 1801 broke out, Augustine Yu, who was recognized as the head of the Church in the Jeolla-do region, was first to be arrested. He was taken to Seoul (Hanyang) where he underwent interrogation and torture at the Police Headquarters. However, since he was already determined to die a martyr, he neither betrayed the other believers nor said anything that would harm the Church. The persecutors, despite all their efforts, could not get any of the information they were looking for. Instead, they charged him with the crime of treason and ordered that he be executed. He was transferred back to Jeonju, where he was hacked to pieces outside the South Gate of Jeonju.

Hwang Il-gwang Simon (1757–1802). Hwang Il-gwang Simon was born in Hongju, Chungcheong-do to a low-class family. Around 1792, he moved to Hongsan, where he went to see Yi Jon-chang Louis Gonzaga to learn about the Catholic teaching. After he understood the faith, he left his hometown and moved to Gyeongsang-do to have more freedom to practice his religious life. He stated, "Here, everybody treats me as a human being despite my low-class status. Now, I believe that Heaven exists here and hereafter." In 1800 Simon Hwang moved to the neighboring house of Chŏng Yakjong Augustine and when Augustine Chŏng moved to Seoul (Hanyang), he also moved to Seoul (Hanyang) with his younger brother and made his living by selling firewood. In 1801, he was arrested while he was on his way to the mountain to get firewood. After stating that the Catholic religion is a 'holy religion', he was beaten to the point that one of his legs was broken. He was then transferred to his hometown Hong ju and was beheaded on 30 January 1802.

Yi Sun-I Lutgarda (1782–1802) and her husband, Yu Jung-cheol John. A couple who kept their virginity through faith. Yi Sun-I Lutgarda was born in 1782 to a well-known noble family. Her brothers Yi Gyeong-do Charles (martyred in 1801) and Yi Gyeong-eon Paul (martyred in 1827), and her husband Yu Jung-cheol John (martyred in 1801) were beatified with her. Yi Yun-ha. Her father Matthew and great-grandfather Yi Ik were renowned scholars. Matthew Yi became a Catholic in 1784, soon after Catholicism was introduced to Korea, when he met Kwon Chol-sin, and Kwon Il-sin. Lutgarda Yi received her First Holy Communion from Father Zhou Wen-mo James and made a vow of chastity. However, in the society of that time, it was extremely difficult for a young woman to remain single. Her mother consulted Father James Zhou who remembered that Yu Jung-cheol John also wanted to live a life of celibacy. He sent a messenger and arranged their marriage. In 1798, Lutgarda Yi went to her husband's hometown, Chonam in Jeonju and made a vow to live a celibate life. During Shinyu Persecution in 1801, Yu Hang-gom Augustine, her father-in-law, was first arrested. She was arrested later and was taken to Jeonju. She was condemned to exile and left for Hamgyeong-do. However soon the police followed them and arrested them again. On 31 January 1802, she was taken to the execution ground in Jeonju, called 'Supjeongi' and was beheaded. The letter she wrote while she was imprisoned in Jeonju still remains and testifies for the values of Catholics of the time.

Kim Jin-hu Pius (1739–1814). The ancestor of the St. Kim Taegon Andrew. Kim Jin-hu Pius was born in Solmoe, Chungcheong-do. He was the great-grandfather of St. Kim Taegon Andrew and the father of Kim Jong-han Andrew, who was martyred in 1816 and was beatified with the 123 Blessed. Pius Kim encountered Catholicism when his eldest son learned the catechism from Yi Jon-chang Gonzaga and taught it to his brothers. As his sons continued to tell him about God, he gradually drew towards Jesus Christ and left his government position to focus on fulfilling religious duties. When Pius Kim was arrested during the Sinhae persecution in 1791, he professed his faith in God. He was arrested four to five more times but was released each time. He was also arrested during the Shinyu Persecution in 1801, but was exiled and set free. Pius Kim was arrested again in 1805 and was taken to Haemi. He continued to profess his faith in God without hesitation and was held in prison for a long time without being sentenced to death. In prison, the officials and prison guards respected him for his dignity and conduct. He spent 10 years in prison and died there on 1 December 1814 at the age of 75.

Yi Seong-rye (1801–1840): A mother who inherited faith to her children. She was born in 1801 in Hongju, Chungcheong-do to the family of Louis Gonzaga Yi Jon-chang. At the age of 17, she married St. Francis Choe Kyeong-hwan and lived in Darakgol, Hongju. In 1821 she gave birth to their first son, Thomas Choe Yang-up. Due to the danger of persecution the family had to move frequently but Yi Seong-rye told Bible stories to her children and taught them to endure difficulties. After settling down in Surisan (currently Gunpo-city, Gyeonggi-do) she helped her husband to set up a Christian village. Meanwhile, her son Thomas Choe Yang-up was chosen to be a seminary candidate and was sent to Macau to study theology. In 1839, during the Gihae persecution her husband went back and forth to Hanyang (now Seoul) to take care of the bodies of the Martyrs, she supported her husband and finally was arrested by the police with her whole family in Surisan. At that time, her new-born baby was nearly starved to death due to lack of milk. She could no longer abandon her baby so she yielded to defy her faith and was released from prison. When her eldest son left to study at a Chinese seminary, she was imprisoned once again. When she was sentenced to death, she was sent to Danggogae (now Wonhyoro 2-ga, Yongsan-gu, Seoul) to be beheaded at the age of 39. Her son Thomas Choe Yang-eop went on to become the second ordained Catholic priest in Korean history.

Full list:

- Paul Yun Ji Chung
- Jacob Gwon Sangyeon
- Peter Won Sijang
- Paul Yun Yuil
- Matthew Choe Ingil
- Sabas Jihwang
- Paul Yi Dogi
- Francis Bang
- Lawrence Pak Chwideuk
- Jacob Won Sibo
- Peter Jeong Sanpil
- Francis Bae Gwangyeom
- Martin In Eonmin
- Francis Yi Bohyeon
- Peter Jo Yongsam
- Barbara Simagi
- Johannes Choe Changhyeon
- Augustine Chŏng Yakjong
- Francis Xavier Hong Gyoman
- Thomas Choe Pilgong
- Luke Hong Nakmin
- Marcellinus Choe Changju
- Martin Yi Jungbae
- Johannes Won Gyeongdo
- Jacob Yun Yuo
- Barnabas Kim Ju
- Peter Choe Pilje
- Lucia Yun Unhye
- Candida Jeong Bokhye
- Thaddeus Jeong Inhyeok
- Carol Jeong Cheolsang
- Father Jacob Zhou Wenmu, Missionary from Qing dynasty
- Paul Yi Gukseung
- Columba Gang Wansuk
- Susanna Gang Gyeongbok
- Matthew Kim Hyeonu
- Bibiana Mun Yeongin
- Juliana Kim Yeoni
- Anthony Yi Hyeon
- Ignatius Choe Incheol
- Agatha Han Sinae
- Barbara Jeong Sunmae
- Agatha Yun Jeomhye
- Andrew Kim Gwangok
- Peter Kim Jeongduk
- Stanislaus Han Jeongheum
- Matthew Choe Yeogyeom
- Andrew Gim Jonggyo
- Philip Hong Pilju
- Augustine Yu Hanggeom
- Francis Yun Jiheon
- Johannes Yu Jungcheol
- Johannes Yu Munseok
- Paul Hyeon Gyeheum
- Francis Kim Sajip
- Gervasius Son Gyeongyun
- Carol Yi Gyeongdo
- Simon Kim Gyewan
- Barnabas Jeong Gwangsu
- Anthony Hong Ikman
- Thomas Han Deokun
- Simon Hwang Ilgwang
- Leo Hong In
- Sebastian Kwon Sangmun
- Lutgrada Yi Suni
- Matthew Yu Jungseong
- Pius Kim Jinhu
- Agatha Magdalena Kim Yundeok
- Alexis Kim Siu
- Francis Choe Bonghan
- Simon Kim Gangi
- Andrew Seo Seokbong
- Francis Kim Huiseong
- Barbara Ku Seongyeol
- Anna Yi Simi
- Peter Ko Seongdae
- Joseph Ko Seongun
- Andrew Kim Jonghan
- Jacob Kim Hwachun
- Peter Jo Suk
- Teresa Kwon
- Paul Yi Gyeongeon
- Paul Pak Gyeonghwa
- Ambrose Kim Sebak
- Richard An Gunsim
- Andrew Yi Jaehaeng
- Andrew Pak Saui
- Andrew Kim Sageon
- Job Yi Ileon
- Peter Sin Taebo
- Peter Yi Taegwon
- Paul Jeong Taebong
- Peter Gim Daegwon
- Johannes Cho Haesong
- Anastasia Kim Joi
- Barbara Kim Joi
- Anastasia Yi Bonggeum
- Brigida Choe
- Protasius Hong Jaeyeong
- Barbara Choe Joi
- Magdalena Yi Joi
- Jacob Oh Jongrye
- Maria Yi Seongrye
- Thomas Jang
- Thaddeus Ku Hanseon
- Paul Oh Banji
- Mark Sin Seokbok
- Stephan Kim Wonjung
- Benedict Song
- Peter Song
- Anna Yi
- Felix Peter Kim Giryang
- Matthias Pak Sanggeun
- Anthony Jeong Chanmun
- Johannes Yi Jeongsik
- Martin Yang Jaehyeon
- Peter Yi Yangdeung
- Luke Kim Jongryun
- Jacob Heo Inbaek
- Francis Pak
- Margarita Oh
- Victor Pak Daesik
- Peter Joseph Yun Bongmun

== Legacy ==
Pope John Paul II, speaking at the canonization, said, "The Korean Church is unique because it was founded entirely by lay people. This fledgling Church, so young and yet so strong in faith, withstood wave after wave of fierce persecution. Thus, in less than a century, it could boast of 10,000 martyrs. The death of these martyrs became the leaven of the Church and led to today's splendid flowering of the Church in Korea. Even today their undying spirit sustains the Christians in the Church of silence in the north of this tragically divided land".

== Beatification ==
After the canonization of the 103 Martyrs, the Catholic Church in Korea felt that the martyrs who died in the other persecutions also need to be recognized. In 2003, the beatification process for 124 martyrs who died in persecutions between 1791 and 1888 began. In 2004 the Archdiocese of Seoul opened its investigation into the cause for beatification of the Servant of God Paul Yun Ji-Chung and his 123 companions who in 1791 were tortured and killed in odium fidei, in hatred of the faith.

This group was declared Venerable by Pope Francis on 7 February 2014.

Among the martyrs in this group are;

- Fr. James Zhou Wen-mo (1752–1801), a Chinese priest who secretly ministered to the Christians in Korea;
- Augustine Chŏng Yakjong (1760–1801), the husband of St. Cecilia Yu So-sa and father of Sts. Paul Chong Ha-sang and Elizabeth Chong Chong-hye;
- Columba Kang Wan-suk (1761–1801), known as the "catechist of the Korean Martyrs";
- Maria Yi Seong-rye (1801–1840) the wife of St. Francis Choe Kyeong-hwan.
- Barbara Sim-gi, an 18-year-old virgin and martyr
- Augustine Yu Hang-geom (1756–1801), also known as the "apostle of Jeolla-do";
- Augustine Yu Hang-geom's son John Yu Jeong-cheol (1779–1801) and his wife Lutgarda Yi Sun-i (1782–1802). They both decided to live celibate lives to fully dedicate themselves to God, but the Confucian society, which greatly valued furthering the family line, made it impossible for them to live as celibates. Fr. James Zhou introduced the two to each other and suggested them to marry each other and live as a "virgin couple". The two were married in 1797 and were martyred 4 years later.

== Korean Martyrs Museum-Shrine ==
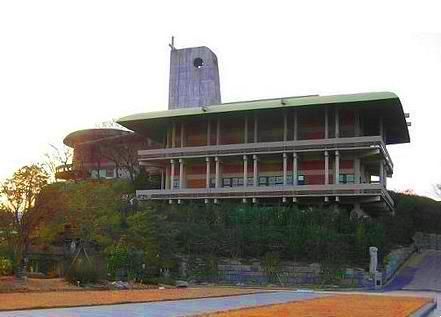
Jeoldu-san Shrine

The Museum-Shrine, which contains rooms for liturgical celebration and prayer, was built in 1967 on the site in Jeoldu-san, where many of the Korean martyrs died from 1866 to 1873. The Shrine-Museum presents numerous historical documents, visual reconstructions, photographs and documentaries.

== Churches named after the martyrs ==
- Holy Korean Martyrs, San Jose, California, US
- Church of the Korean Martyrs, Nashville, Tennessee, US
- Church of the Korean Martyrs, Saddle Brook, New Jersey, US
- Korean Martyrs Catholic Church of Portland, Oregon, US
- Korean Martyrs Catholic Church of Atlanta, Georgia, US
- Korean Martyrs Catholic Church of Westminster, California, US
- Korean Martyrs Catholic Church of Chicago, Illinois, US
- Korean Martyrs Catholic Church of Boerne, Texas, US

== See also ==
- Christianity in Korea
- Roman Catholicism in South Korea
- Seohak
- Catholic Persecution of 1801
- Robert Jermain Thomas
- Christianization

== Bibliography ==
- Attwater, Donald and Catherine Rachel John (1993). The Penguin Dictionary of Saints. 3rd ed. New York: Penguin Books. ISBN 0-14-051312-4.
- Dallet, Charles (1874). Histoire de l'Église de Corée, Vol. 1. Paris: Librairie Victor Palmé. (in French)
- Dallet, Charles (1874). Histoire de l'Église de Corée, Vol. 2. Paris: Librairie Victor Palmé. (in French)
- Fathers of the London Oratory (1859). The New Glories of the Catholic Church. London: Richardson and Son.
