= Pierre-Henri Dorie =

French Roman Catholic saint

Saint Pierre-Henri Doris
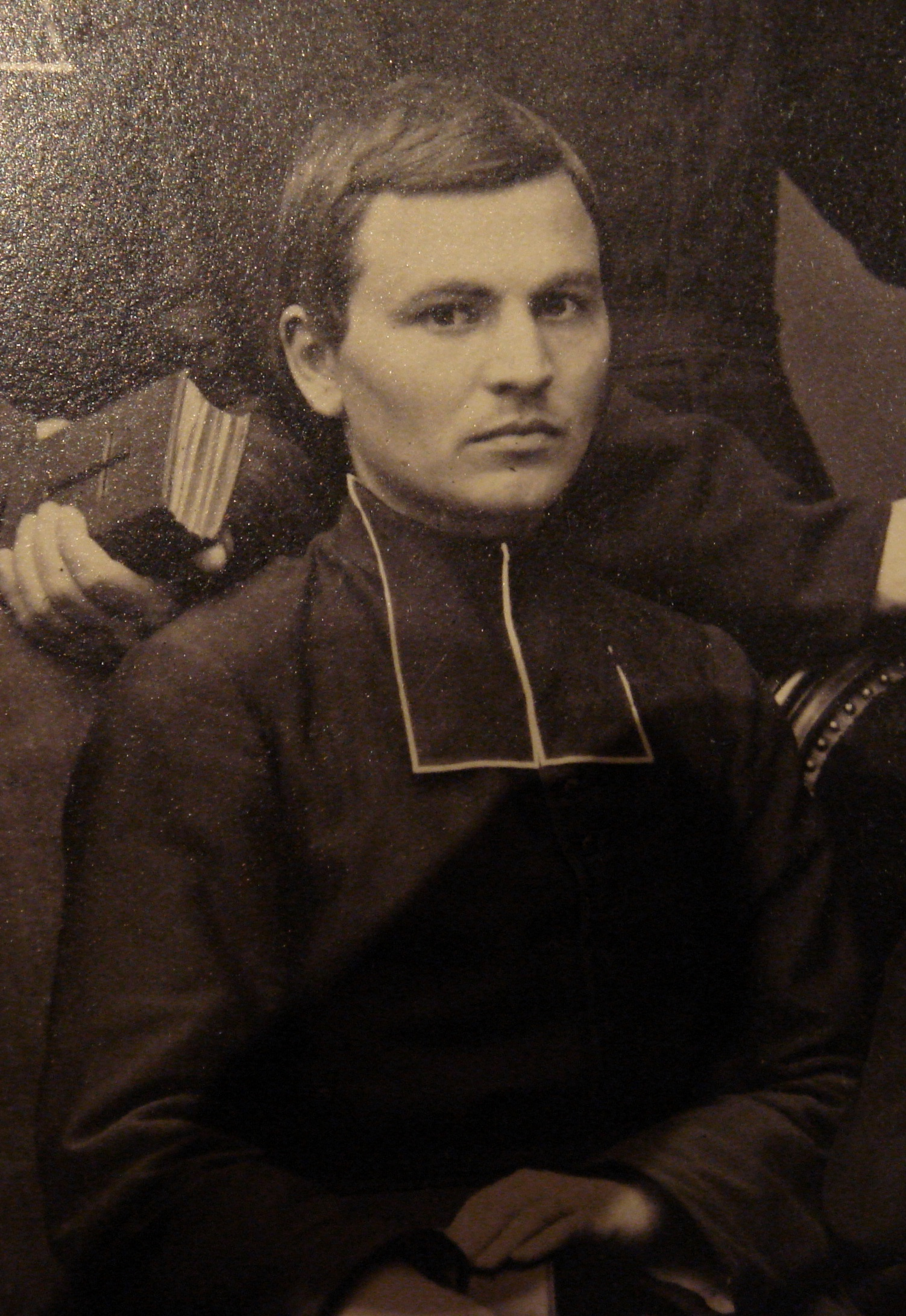
- Pierre Henri Dorie in 1864, before his departure for Korea
- Born: 23 September 1839; Saint-Hilaire-de-Talmont, Vendée, France
- Died: 7 March 1866 (aged 26); Saenamteo, Seoul, South Korea
- Beatified: 6 October 1968 by Pope Paul VI
- Canonized: 6 May 1984 by Pope John Paul II
- Feast: 7 March; 20 September (Roman calendar, along with the Korean Martyrs)

Pierre Henri Dorie (1839–1866) was a French missionary of the Paris Foreign Missions Society, who was martyred in Korea in 1866. His feast day is 7 March, and he is also venerated along with the rest of the 103 Korean Martyrs on 20 September.

== Biography ==
Henri Dorie was born on 23 September 1839 in Saint-Hilaire-de-Talmont.

Following the arrest and execution of Bishop Siméon-François Berneux on 7 March 1866, all but three of the French missionaries in Korea were also captured and executed: among them were Bishop Antoine Daveluy, Father Just de Bretenières, Father Louis Beaulieu, Father Dorie, Father Pierre Aumaître, Father Martin-Luc Huin, all of them members of the Paris Foreign Missions Society.

The persecutions triggered the French Campaign against Korea in October–November 1866, which reinforced the Korean policy of isolationism.

Like the other martyrs, Pierre Henri Dorie was canonized by Pope John Paul II on 6 May 1984 under the name Peter Henricus Dorie.

== See also ==
- France-Korea relations

== Bibliography ==
- The Lives of the 103 Martyr Saints of Korea 38: Saint Pierre Henri Dorie, Priest (1839-1866), Catholic Bishops' Conference of Korea Newsletter No. 51 (Summer 2005).
