= Thomas Son Chasuhn =

Saint Thomas Son Chasuhn
- Venerated in: Catholic Church
- Feast: March 30; September 20 (Roman calendar, along with The Korean Martyrs)

- Thomas Son Chasuhn
- Hangul: 손자선
- RR: Son Jaseon
- MR: Son Chasŏn

Baptismal name
- Hangul: 토마스
- RR: Tomaseu
- MR: T'omasŭ

Thomas Son Chasuhn (1838–1866) was one of the Korean Martyrs canonised by the Roman Catholic church in 1984. His feast day is March 30, and he is also venerated along with the rest of the 103 Korean martyrs on September 20.

Thomas was a devout Catholic. When Bishop Daveluy was arrested, an authority commissioned anybody to claim the confiscated objects. Everyone was too afraid to go and claim the Church property, and Thomas accepted commission to claim them. But, instead of holding its promise, the officials questioned his religion. Thomas confessed it boldly, and was thrown in prison. It was the time of Lent, and Thomas observed with a scrupulous exactitude the fasts and the abstinences of the Church, fasts and abstinences whose rigour was doubled both by his other sufferings and the insufficient food given to the prisoners. In the same way, nothing could make him omit any of his ordinary practices of piety. He was severely tortured with amazing constancy and gladness. When fellow Catholics buried him four days later and reburied him somewhere else twenty days later, his body was found to be incorrupt and did not have any bad smell to it.

== Bibliography ==
- The Lives of the 103 Martyr Saints of Korea: Son Cha-soun Thomas (1836-1866), Catholic Bishops' Conference of Korea Newsletter No. 77 (Winter 2011).
