= Jeoldu-san =

Jeoldu-san Martyrs' Shrine
- 절두산
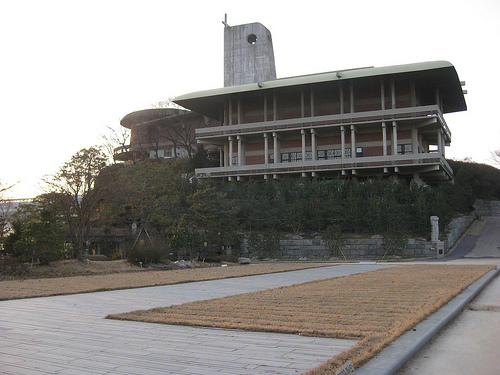
- Established: 1967
- Location: 96-1, Hapjeong-dong, Mapo-gu, Seoul
- Type: Museum & Shrine
- Website: 절두산

Jeoldu-san (Korean: 절두산; Hanja: 切頭山; lit. 'decapitation mountain') is a rocky promontory overlooking the Han River in the district of Mapo-gu, Seoul, South Korea. A public memorial shrine is located at a historic ferry landing next to Yanghwajin Foreigners' Cemetery.

== History ==
It came into use as an execution site for mostly Korean converts to Catholicism during the rule of the Daewon-gun, the regent of Joseon, in the late 1860s. The present memorial was built for the 100th anniversary of the Byeonin Persecution, and dedicated to the approximately 8,000 executions at the site. In 1984, Pope John Paul II visited the site, while Mother Teresa did so a year later. The memorial currently enshrines some 3,000 relics related to the martyrs.

== See also ==
- Korean Martyrs
- List of museums in South Korea
- List of museums in Seoul
