= Madeleine Cho =

Korean Catholic saint (1807–1839)

Saint Madeleine Cho
- Born: 조막달레나; 1807; Seoul, Joseon
- Died: 1839; Seoul, Joseon
- Honored in: Roman Catholic
- Beatified: 1925, Seoul by Pope Pius XI
- Feast: 20 September

Madeleine Cho (Korean: 조막달레나, romanized: Jo Magdallena) was a Korean Christian laywoman and saint. She is known as one of the Korean Martyrs of the 19th century.

She was recognized as a martyr and beatified in 1925 by Pope Pius XI, and was solemnly canonized in Seoul by Pope John Paul II on 6 May 1984 with the other martyrs of Korea.

Saint Madeleine Cho is celebrated on 20 and 26 September.

== Biography ==
Madeleine Cho was born in 1806 or 1807 in Seoul, Joseon. She was the daughter of Catherine Yi, a Catholic and future martyr, who converted her husband.

Madeleine was considered the most devout of her siblings, and would get up early every morning to pray, and helped her mother by sewing and weaving. When she turned 18, her mother wanted her to marry a Catholic, but she refused and insisted on remaining a virgin for Jesus.

Since celibacy was frowned upon and viewed with suspicion in the family, she left home to avoid judgement. She became a servant in a Catholic household where the hard work and low quality food made her ill. Once she had recovered, she went to another household where the work was easier. She sent the money she earned to her mother.

At over 30 years old, she returned to her mother's home, believing she would no longer be pressured to marry. She taught illiterate catechumens, cared for the sick, and baptized children who were close with to death. Saint Madeleine was known for being gentle, humble, and selfless and reserved the most arduous work for herself, leaving the less difficult tasks to others.

Madeleine Cho was arrested at the end of June or the beginning of July 1839. She was tortured, along with her mother and other women in their circle. She refused to renounce her faith and was severely tortured. She was ill for two months, like her mother, who died of illness that autumn. Madeleine was beheaded in September 1839.

== Canonisation ==
Madeleine Cho was recognized as a martyr by decree of the Holy See on 9 May 1925 and thus proclaimed venerable. She was beatified (proclaimed blessed ) on 6 June following by Pope Pius XI.

She was canonized (proclaimed a saint) by Pope John Paul II on 6 May 1984 in Seoul at the same time as the other Korean martyrs.

Saint Madeleine Cho is celebrated on 26 September individually, and 20 September, which is the common date for celebrating the martyrs of Korea.

== See also ==
- Korean Martyrs
