= Teresa Kim Im-i =

Korean Roman Catholic martyr and saint (1811–1846)

Saint Teresa Kim Im-i Martyr
- Born: 1811; Seoul, Korea
- Died: 20 September 1846 (aged 34–35); Seoul, Korea
- Venerated in: Catholic Church
- Beatified: 5 July 1925 by Pope Pius XI
- Canonized: 6 May 1984, Yeouido, Seoul, South Korea by Pope John Paul II
- Feast: 20 September (with the 102 martyrs of Korea)

Saint Teresa Kim Im-i (Korean: 남경문 베드로; 1811 – 20 September 1846) was a Korean lay Christian seamstress who was killed for her faith in 1846. She was declared a martyr and beatified in 1925, and canonized in 1984 along with the Korean Martyrs.

== Life ==
She was born in Seoul, Korea in 1811 into a Christian family. From a young age, she took an interest in the biographies of saints, and at the age of seventeen, she decided to remain a virgin.

Teresa lived for three years in the princess’s palace as a seamstress, and later moved in with relatives or friends, particularly with the foster mother of Saint John Yi-Mun-u. In 1845, she worked as a housekeeper for Saint Andrew Kim Taegon, and Teresa told her sister that if Saint Andrew were ever arrested, she would remain by his side.

The following year, in 1846, a persecution of Christians began and despite seeking refuge at her sister’s home and wanting to meet Saint Charles Hyon Song-mun, on 10 July 1846, she was arrested at his home along with three other women. Teresa spent more than two months in prison, and official records indicate that she remained steadfast in her faith despite interrogation and torture.

On 20 September 1846, along with six others, she was executed at the Seoul prison at the age of 36, following a beating and possibly by strangulation.

== Canonization ==
She was declared a martyr following the decree of 9 May 1925. Teresa was beatified on 5 July 1925, by Pope Pius XI along with 79 other Korean martyrs, and canonized by Pope John Paul II in Yeouido square of Seoul on 6 May 1984, along with the rest of the martyrs. Her feast day is celebrated on 20 September.
