= Catherine Yi =

Korean Catholic saint (1783–1839)

Saint Catherine Yi
- Born: 1783; Seoul
- Died: September 1839; Seoul
- Honored in: Roman Catholic
- Beatified: 6 June 1925, Seoul by Pope Pius XI
- Canonized: 6 May 1984 by Pope John Paul II
- Feast: 20 September

Catherine Yi (Korean: 이 가타리나) was a Korean Christian laywoman, martyr, and saint. She was recognized as a martyr and beatified in 1925 by Pius XI, she was solemnly canonized in Seoul by Pope John Paul II on 6 May 1984 with a group of 102 other Korean martyrs. Saint Catherine Yi is celebrated on 20 and 26 September.

== Biography ==
Catherine Yi was born in 1782 or 1783 in Seoul, Korea. She came from a Catholic family, but was not well educated about religion.

She married a non-Christian man and converted him. They had many children, whom she raised in her faith in God. Among her children, Madeleine Cho was the most devout. Catherine Yi wanted her daughter Madeleine to marry, but Madeleine refused in order to remain a virgin for Christ. She understood her daughter's desire but worried about her; so as not to embarrass her mother, Madeleine left to live and work in Seoul for several years, and only returned to live with her mother when she was over the age of 30.

Catherine Yi decided to move to Seoul with her daughter Madeleine to avoid religious persecution. The episcopal vicar, Laurent-Joseph-Marius Imbert, learned of their arrival in Seoul and helped them find accommodation in a Catholic home. They were able to live there peacefully, but only for a short time, as Seoul proved to be a more dangerous place for Catholics than in the countryside. Despite this they decided to stay.

Catherine Yi was arrested in summer 1839 along with her daughter Madeleine and three other women from their circle. She refused the police chief's invitation to renounce her faith and was severely tortured. She was ill in prison for two months, as was her daughter, and is believed to have eventually died of illness in the autumn, or was beheaded.

== Canonisation ==
Catherine Yi was recognized as a martyr by decree of the Holy See on 9 May 1925 and thus proclaimed venerable. She was beatified on 6 June 1925 following by Pope Pius XI.

She was canonized (proclaimed a saint) by Pope John Paul II on 6 May 1983 in Seoul along with 102 other Korean martyrs.

Saint Catherine Yi is celebrated on 26 September individually, and 20 September, which is the common date for celebrating the martyrs of Korea.

== See also ==
- Korean Martyrs
