= Thaddeus Liu =

Saint Thaddeus Liu
- Born: 1773; Qionglai, Sichuan, Qing China
- Died: 1823 (aged 49–50); Qu County, Sichuan, Qing China
- Cause of death: Martyrdom
- Beatified: 1900 by Pope Leo XIII
- Canonized: 2000 by Pope John Paul II

Thaddeus Liu (Chinese name: 劉瑞庭; 1773–1823) was a Chinese priest and martyr of the 19th century.

== Life ==
He was born in 1773 in Qionglai, near Chengdu, in Sichuan. His Chinese name was Liu Ruiting. His father died when he was only two years old, and his mother raised him in extreme poverty until she remarried. She then took him to live with them together on her new husband's farm.

After his mother and stepfather died, he became a priest's assistant. He learned Latin from the priest and later joined a seminary. He was ordained at the age of 34 by Gabriel-Taurin Dufresse. Following ordination, he served as a priest in Sichuan and Guizhou.

In 1821, Thaddeus and a group of other Catholics were arrested by the authorities. Thaddeus was imprisoned and tortured. He was later executed by strangulation on November 30th 1823.

== Canonization ==
He was beatified on May 27, 1900, by Pope Leo XIII and canonized along with other martyrs of China on October 1, 2000, by Pope John Paul II.

== See also ==
- Catholic Church in Sichuan
