= Gaetana Sterni =

Italian Roman Catholic nun

Blessed Gaetana Sterni

Religious
- Born: 26 June 1827; Cassola, Vicenza, Kingdom of Lombardy–Venetia
- Died: 26 November 1889 (aged 62); Bassano del Grappa, Vicenza, Kingdom of Italy
- Venerated in: Roman Catholic Church
- Beatified: 4 November 2001, Saint Peter's Square, Vatican City by Pope John Paul II
- Feast: 26 November
- Attributes: Religious habit
- Patronage: Sisters of Divine Will

Gaetana Sterni (26 June 1827 – 26 November 1889) was an Italian Roman Catholic nun and the founder of the Sisters of Divine Will. Sterni's life became marred due to the deaths of close relations including her husband and sole child which prompted her to look towards an apostolate to aid others and to ease others' sufferings. The order she founded was dedicated to total consecration to Jesus Christ and to an active apostolate of evangelic zeal.

Her beatification cause commenced under Pope John XXIII in 1960 while she became titled as Venerable in 1991. Pope John Paul II presided over her beatification on 4 November 2001 at Saint Peter's Square.

== Life ==
Gaetana Sterni was born in Cassola in Vicenza on 26 June 1827 as one of six children to Giovanni Battista Sterni and Giovanna Chiuppani. Her baptism was celebrated on 26 June at the local parish church of San Giovanni Evangelista. At Pentecost on 17 May 1835 she and her sister Rosa received their Confirmation from the Bishop of Padua Modesto Farina and her elder sister Margherita acted as the sponsor. She received her First Communion in 1837. Siblings were:

- Margherita (6 August 1817 – 15 November 1835)
- Francesco (b. 23 May 1822)
- Antonio (b. 25 August 1830)
- Maria Teresa (b. 3 May 1833)

In her adolescence her elder sister Margherita died in late 1835 and her father had contracted dementia in 1836 and soon after died on 28 May 1838. Her brother Francesco left home around this time in order to pursue a career as an actor. Her confessor from 1839 until 1851 was the priest Girolamo Maria Maritani (30 August 1785 – 13 May 1852). It was around this point that she received a marriage offer from Liberale Conte (20 August 1811 – 1843) – a widower with three children – and the two married on 7 November 1842 at the church of San Rocco in Santa Chiara with Maritani presiding. A brother-in-law was Angelo Conte. Liberate had married in 1831 to Maddalena Rizzoli who died aged 28 on 26 September 1841. The step-children included Ippolita (b. 27 September 1831) as well as Luigi (b. 22 December 1833) and Antonia (b. 3 January 1835). She attended Mass with her husband and step-children on 29 June 1843 when Liberate fell ill all of a sudden and deteriorated in the following weeks. Her husband died eight months after the two married before her sole child Francesco was born on 15 December 1843 and that child died within a week of its birth.

In March 1844 she and her step-children moved to a new home. Her in-laws – who resented her – demanded in 1846 that her three step-children be returned to them. In 1846 she decided to return home due to widowhood but later in February 1847 with her sister Rosa joined a Canossian convent at Bassano del Grappa where she remained until the death of her mother on 17 February 1849; she left the convent to care for her siblings.

In 1835 she started to work at a hospice for beggars at Bassano del Grapo and remained there for over three decades. In 1860 she made a private vow of total devotion to God. Sterni founded the Sisters of Divine Will in 1865 and it received diocesan approval from the Bishop of Vicenza Giovanni Antonio Farina on 19 May 1875. Sterni made her profession as a professed religious of her order on 20 August 1865.

Sterni died on 26 November 1889 and her remains were interred at the order's motherhouse in Bassano del Grapo. Her order received the decree of praise from Pope Pius XI on 10 July 1934 and full pontifical approval from Pope Pius XII on 12 January 1942. In 2005 there were 311 religious in 54 houses in places such as Ecuador and Cameroon.

== Beatification ==
The beatification process opened under Pope John XXIII in 1960 – she became titled as a Servant of God – and Bishop Carlo Zinato opened the informative process in 1960 for the potential beatification and later closed it in 1964. Theologians approved all of her spiritual writings in a decree issued on 14 July 1967 while historians for the Congregation of Rites approved the cause on 4 May 1968 as did historians for the Congregation for the Causes of Saints later on 21 January 1986. The C.C.S. then received the Positio in 1987 and then validated the informative process on 16 January 1987.

Theologians approved the cause on 19 December 1989 as did the C.C.S. on 3 July 1990 before Pope John Paul II confirmed her heroic virtue on 22 January 1991 and named her as Venerable. The process for a miracle spanned from 1967 until 1969 and was then validated on 28 November 1986 before a medical board approved it on 15 June 2000. Theologians also assented to this on 12 January 2001 as did the C.C.S. on 20 March 2001 before the pope granted final approval for it on 24 April 2001; John Paul II beatified Sterni in Saint Peter's Square on 4 November 2001.

The current postulator for this cause is Paolo Vilotta.
