= John Yi Yun-il =

Korean Catholic saint (1822–1867)

Saint John Yi Yun-il
- Born: 1822
- Died: January 21, 1867 (aged 44–45); Daegu, South Korea
- Venerated in: Catholic Church
- Feast: January 21; September 20 (Roman calendar, along with The Korean Martyrs)

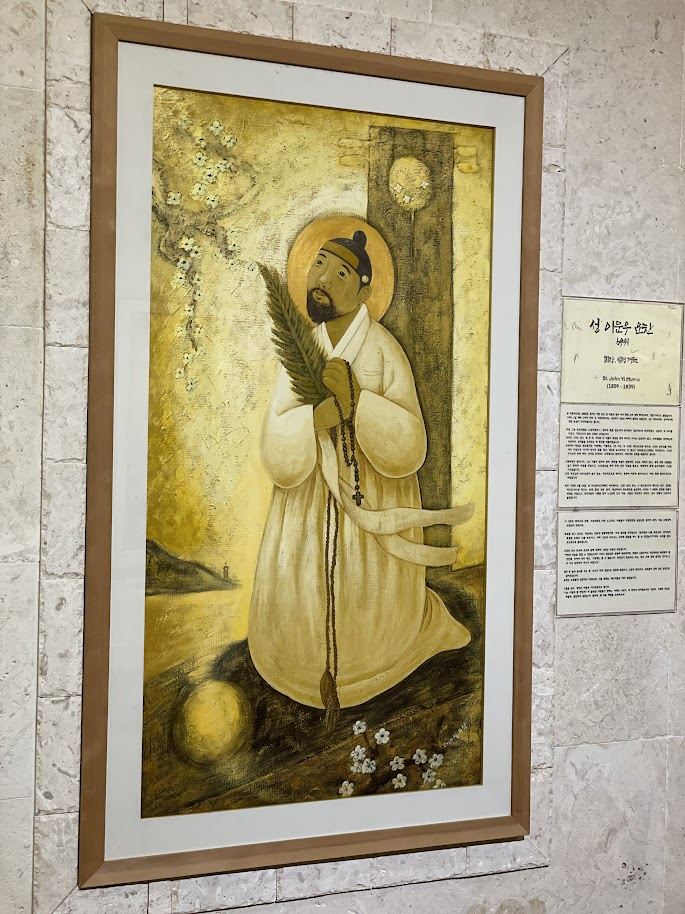
Photo taken at Danggogae Catholic Martyrs' Shrine in Seoul, South Korea

John Yi Yun-il (1822 – January 21, 1867) was a Korean Catholic who was killed during the 19th-century Korean persecution of Christians. He was a family man who made his living as a farmer and who also served as a catechist, i.e. a teacher of Christian religion.

== Death ==
John Yi Yun-il was killed during the Catholic Persecution of 1866 at Gwandeokjeong, a military training center in what is now Daegu, South Korea. Though flogged until the flesh of his limbs was torn, he remained strong in the Christian faith, and he was finally decapitated.

== Sainthood ==
He is venerated in the Catholic Church as a martyr and was canonized as one of 103 Korean martyr saints by John Paul II on May 6, 1984.

He is one of two patron saints of the Archdiocese of Daegu, along with Our Lady of Lourdes. His body is preserved in a chapel in the Archdiocese of Daegu. At the time of John's death, the site of his execution, Gwandeokjeong was used for the execution of criminals. Due to the number of Christian martyrs who were executed there, the site is now treated by the Archdiocese as a sacred place.

John Yi Yun-il's feast day is January 21, the day of his death, and he is also venerated along with the rest of the 103 Korean martyrs on September 20.
