= Stephen Min Kuk-ka =

Korean Roman Catholic saint and martyr

Saint Stephen Min Kuk-ka
- Born: 1787; Joseon
- Died: 1840 (aged 52–53)
- Venerated in: Catholic Church

Stephen Min Kuk-ka (Korean: 민극가; Hanja: 閔克可; 1787–1840) was a Korean Roman Catholic saint. He was martyred by strangulation after refusing to deny his faith. His feast day is January 20, and he is also venerated along with the rest of the 103 Korean martyrs on September 20.

Born in 1787 in a non-Christian sect of Korea, his mother died soon after childbirth. With his brothers and father, he converted to Catholicism. He married, but his wife died shortly after their wedding. A few years later, he remarried and his wife had a beautiful daughter. Both later died, leaving him alone once more.

He decided to devote his life to Christ by becoming a Catechist. This was risky: He lived in an era where the Confucian government did not approve of people spreading their own faiths. After a length of time in which he converted many people, he was taken into government custody. The government beat and tortured him, trying to get him to deny his faith. He refused many times over. In 1840, he paid for his conviction when he was strangled to death.

== Sources ==
- St. Stephen Min Kuk-Ka. Online. http://www.catholic.org/saints/saint.php?saint_id=5993

== Bibliography ==
- The Lives of the 103 Martyr Saints of Korea: Min Kŭk-ka Stephen (1788-1840), Catholic Bishops' Conference of Korea Newsletter No. 78 (Spring 2012).
