= Anna Pak Agi =

Catholic saint, one of the Korean Martyrs

Saint Anna Pak Agi
- Born: 1783; Kangchon, Gangwon-do, South Korea
- Died: 24 May 1839 (aged 55–56); Small West Gate, Seoul, South Korea
- Venerated in: Catholic Church
- Beatified: 5 July 1925 by Pope Pius XI
- Canonized: 6 May 1984 by John Paul II
- Feast: 20 September

- Anna Pak Agi
- Hangul: 박아기
- RR: Bak Agi
- MR: Pak Agi

Baptismal name
- Hangul: 안나
- RR: Anna
- MR: Anna

Anna Pak Agi (Korean: 박아기 안나; 1782 – 24 May 1839) is one of 103 Korean Martyrs. Her feast day is May 24, and she is also venerated along with the rest of the 103 Korean martyrs on 20 September.

== Biography ==
Anna Pak A-gi [Agi] was born in 1783 in Gangcheon, Joseon. Her family was Catholic. Anna was naturally slow, and she had great difficulty in learning about religion. She consoled herself by saying, "Since I cannot know my God as I should desire to do, I will at least endeavor to love Him with all my heart."

She married a Christian, Frans Tae Mun-haeong. They had two sons and three daughters. She felt particular devotion in meditating on the Passion of our Lord: the sight of his five wounds was sufficient to draw tears from her eyes.

She was arrested with her husband and eldest son. The latter had numerous friends at court, who did all in their power to make them apostates, and at length succeeded as far as her husband and son were concerned: they were then set free. Anna, however, remained firm. The judge often tried to shake her determination by severity or by kindness, but his endeavors were vain.

Her husband and son came to see her daily and entreated her to say but one word, and leave the prison. They presented to her the desolation of her family, her old mother at the point of death, her children crying out for her, but her resolution was unshaken. "What," she said, "for a few days of life will you expose yourselves to everlasting death? Instead of soliciting me to transgress, you should exhort me to remain steadfast. Return, return rather to God, and envy me my happiness."

Anna remained in prison for three months, and died on 24 May 1839, at the age of fifty-seven. After this, Anna was beatified on 5 July 1925 following her death in prison after refusing to renounce her Catholic faith. She was later canonized by Pope John Paul II, in Seoul, South Korea, as one of the Korean Martyrs.

== Bibliography ==
- The Lives of the 103 Korean Martyr Saints: Saint Pak A-gi Anne (1783-1839), Catholic Bishops' Conference of Korea Newsletter No. 46 (Spring 2004).
