= John Baptist Yi Kwang-nyol =

Korean Roman Catholic saint and martyr

Saint John Baptist Yi Kwang-nyol
- Feast: July 20; September 20 (Roman calendar, along with The Korean Martyrs)

- John Baptist Yi Kwang-nyol
- Hangul: 이광렬
- RR: I Gwangryeol
- MR: I Kwangnyŏl

Baptismal name
- Hangul: 요한
- RR: Yohan
- MR: Yohan

John Baptist Yi Kwang-nyol (c. 1800 – July 20, 1839) was one of the 103 Korean Martyrs. His feast day is July 20, and he is also venerated along with the rest of The Korean martyrs on September 20.

John embraced Roman Catholicism with his elder brother when he was 28 years old. His fervor attracted the attention of the catechists, who sent him to Beijing to negotiate affairs of religion. The priests of the capital, in admiration of his piety, conferred upon him baptism and the other sacraments. John Baptist, after his return to his country, abstained from eating meat throughout the rest of his life, and made a resolution to live in celibacy. He was noted for his holy exterior appearance. He was martyred at the age of 39, severely tortured with torturing instruments and at last beheaded with an axe.

== Bibliography ==
- The Lives of the 103 Martyr Saints of Korea: Saint John Baptist Yi Kwang-nyol (1795~1839), Catholic Bishops' Conference of Korea Newsletter No. 56 (Fall 2006).
