= Maria Repetto =

Blessed Maria Repetto
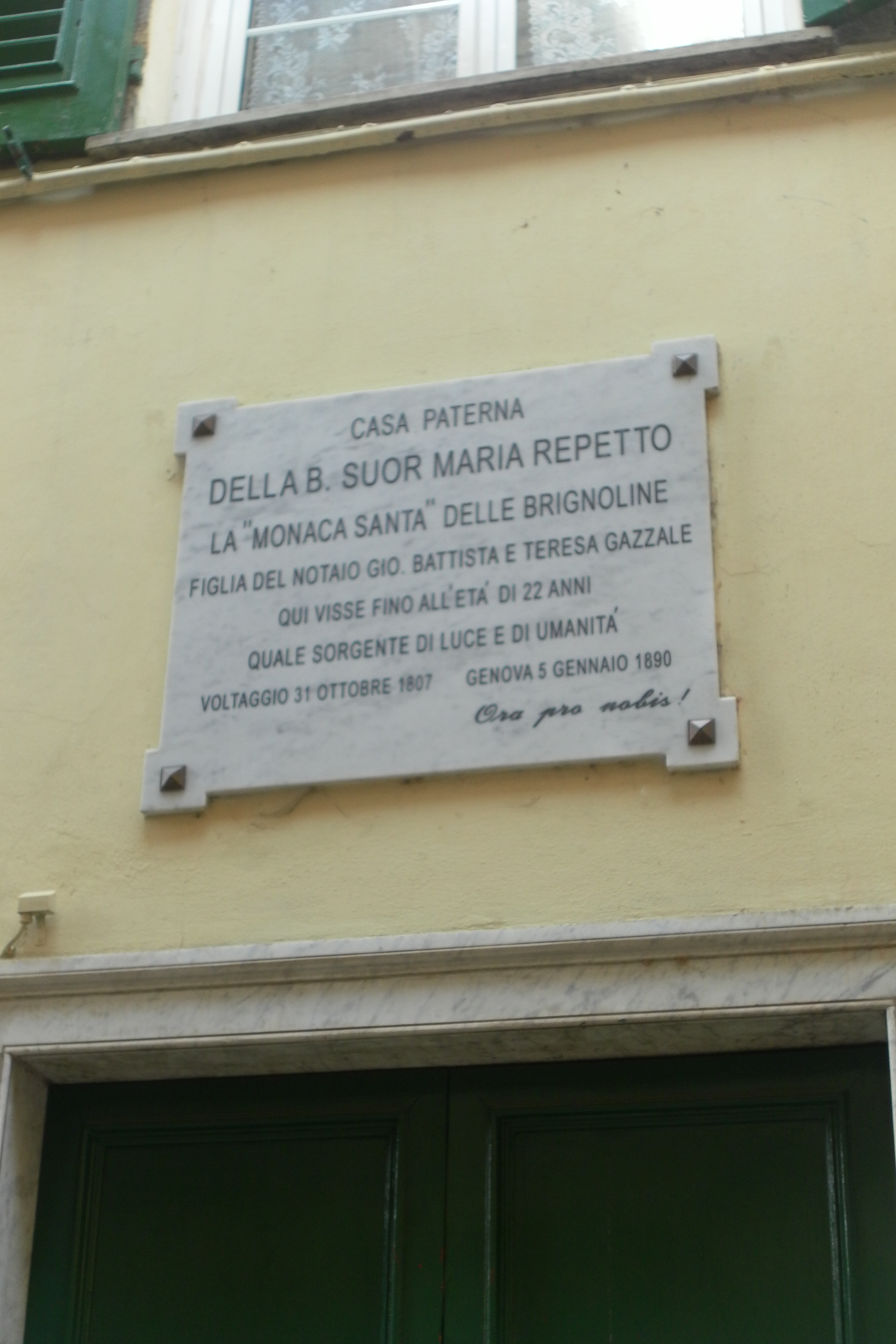

Religious
- Born: 1 November 1807; Voltaggio, Alessandria, Kingdom of Sardinia
- Died: 5 January 1890 (aged 82); Genoa, Kingdom of Italy
- Venerated in: Roman Catholic Church
- Beatified: 4 October 1981, Saint Peter's Square, Vatican City by Pope John Paul II
- Feast: 5 January
- Attributes: Religious habit

Maria Repetto (1 November 1807 – 5 January 1890) was an Italian Roman Catholic professed religious from the Sisters of Our Lady of Refuge in Mount Calvary. Repetto was an ardent devotee of Saint Joseph and promoted devotion to him while distributing medals and images of him to those who visited the convent she was at; she also distinguished herself as an able carer for cholera victims on two occasions of epidemic.

Repetto's cause for sainthood was introduced under Pope Pius XII on 11 March 1949 (she therefore was titled as a Servant of God) and Pope Paul VI named her as Venerable in 1968 after confirming her heroic virtue. Pope John Paul II beatified her in Saint Peter's Square on 4 October 1981.

== Life ==
Maria Repetto was born on 1 November 1807 in Voltaggio as the first of eleven children to Giovanni Battista Repetto and Teresa Gazzale; three sisters became nuns and one brother became a priest and one sister was Josephine. She was baptized on the date of her birth and later made her First Communion in 1817. Around the time she was thirteen she had seen the death of two of her brothers.

Repetto joined the Brignolines at Bisagno near Genoa on 7 May 1829 and later received the habit of the order on 15 August 1829 - the Feast of the Assumption. She professed her final vows in 1831. She worked as a seamstress and embroiderer. Her sight began to fail and so she was made the portress and the gatekeeper of the convent that she was stationed at where she would promote a devotion to Saint Joseph and distribute both medals and images of him to people. Repetto also distinguished herself in aiding the ill during two cholera epidemics in 1835 and 1854. People flocked from all over Genoa to see her at the convent and some religious saw this as a disruption to their activities so removed her from her position. The sisters later re-evaluated this and put her back in her old position.

Repetto suffered a minor convulsion and died mere moments later in 1890 and her final words were: "Regina coeli laetare hallelujah". On 8 September 1888 she had asked God to take her to Heaven.

== Beatification ==
The beatification cause commenced in Genoa in an informative process that Carlo Dalmazio Minoretti opened in 1927 and later closed in 1933. Theologians approved her spiritual writings on 18 November 1941; the formal introduction to her cause opened under Pope Pius XII on 11 March 1949 and she was made a Servant of God. The informative process was validated on 19 January 1958.

An antepreparatory committee approved the cause on 28 February 1961 as did a preparatory one on 8 March 1966 and the general committee on 22 May 1967. Pope Paul VI named her as Venerable on 4 July 1968 after confirming that she had lived a life of heroic virtue. The cognitional process for a miracle spanned from 1951 to 1953 and was validated on 17 January 1958. A medical approved it on 25 September 1968 as did the Congregation for the Causes of Saints and their consultants on 8 January 1980 before Pope John Paul II approved it on 30 March 1981. John Paul II beatified Repetto on 4 October 1981 at Saint Peter's Square.
