= Claude-Charles Dallet =

French Catholic missionary

Claude-Charles Dallet (1829–1878) was a Catholic missionary who is best known for his work The History of the Church of Korea (Histoire de l'Église de Corée).

Charles Dallet was born in Langres, France, on 18 October 1829. He joined the Paris Foreign Missions Society in 1850 and was ordained on 5 June 1852. Shortly after, he was sent to Mysore, in southern India. He was appointed as the Apostolic Vicar in Bangalore in 1857. In 1859, he published there, in English, a work titled Controversial Catechism, or short answers to the objections of Protestants against the true religion.

He spent the years 1860 to 1863 in France, recovering from epilepsy. During this period, he supervised the casting of type fonts for the Telugu and Kanara languages, which he took with him when he returned to Bangalore in 1863, using them for some publications in vernacular languages under his editorship. In 1867, he got ill again and returned to France.

In 1870 he was sent to North and South America on a fund-raising tour. He stayed for a time at Laval University in Quebec. After returning to France, he classified manuscripts regarding the Catholic Church in Korea—largely the work of the martyred bishop Antoine Daveluy—which provided the material for his Histoire de l'Église de Corée (1874, two volumes). In 1877, Dallet went back to Asia, this time passing Russia, Manchuria, China and Japan. From Japan he stopped at Cochin China. While in Tongkin, he died of dysentery on 25 April 1878.
