= Peter Lieou =

Catholic saint

Saint Peter Lieou 彼得·列欧

Martyr
- Born: 1760; Guizhou, China
- Died: 17 May 1834 (aged 73–74); Guiyang, China
- Venerated in: Roman Catholic Church
- Beatified: 1900, Saint Peter's Square, Vatican City by Pope Leo XIII
- Canonized: 1 October 2000, Saint Peter's Square, Vatican City by Pope John Paul II
- Feast: 17 May

Peter Lieou also known as Liu Wenyuan Petrus / Baiduo / Peter Liu Wenyuan was Chinese Catholic convert, layman, missionary and a martyr. He was exiled and was strangled to death in a prison for being a Christian and preaching Christianity in China.

== Early life ==
Lieou was born in Guizhou, China in 1760. Peter was a married man who converted to Christianity and then became a catechist in the church.

== Persecution ==
Peter was warned by authorities about his practice of faith and preaching and finally because of his faith he was exiled to Mongolia in 1814. He was allowed to return from exile in 1827 and as soon as he came back, he started working with Catholic missionaries. Many Christians were made prisoners once again with the fresh persecution of Christianity in China. Peter was able to evade arrest initially but was soon caught ministering to prisoners, his sons were also among the other prisoners in the prison.

== Martyrdom ==
Peter was martyred by strangling to death on 17 May 1834 in Guiyang, China.

== Canonization ==
On 2 July 1899, Peter was venerated and declared a martyr by Pope Leo XIII. Pope Leo XIII beatified him in 1900. He was finally canonized and declared a saint on 1 October 2000 by Pope John Paul II.
