= Tommaso Maria Fusco =

Italian Catholic priest (1831–1891)

Blessed Tommaso Maria Fusco
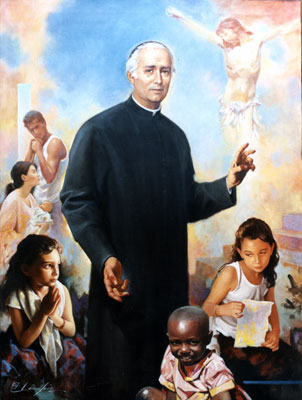
- Tommaso Maria Fusco, was an Italian Roman Catholic priest

Priest
- Born: 1 December 1831; Pagani, Salerno, Kingdom of the Two Sicilies
- Died: 24 February 1891 (aged 59); Pagani, Salerno, Kingdom of Italy
- Venerated in: Roman Catholic Church
- Beatified: 7 October 2001, Saint Peter's Square, Vatican City by Pope John Paul II
- Feast: 24 February
- Attributes: Crucifix; Zucchetto
- Patronage: Daughters of Charity of the Most Precious Blood

Tommaso Maria Fusco (1 December 1831 – 24 February 1891) was an Italian Roman Catholic priest who established the Daughters of Charity of the Most Precious Blood.

Pope John Paul II beatified him in 2001 and his cause for sainthood still continues.

== Life ==
Tommaso Maria Fusco was born on 1 December 1831 to Antonio Fusco and Stella Giordano as the seventh of eighth children. His mother died when he was six and his father when he was ten which led to his uncle Giuseppe adopting the children. In Nocera he commenced his studies for the priesthood in 1847 which also marked the death of his uncle. He was ordained to the priesthood on 22 December 1855.

Fusco served as a parish priest and opened a school in his own home. He became a member of the Congregation of the Missionaries of Nocera in 1857 and became a traveler in the south to preach. He also established the Priestly Society of the Catholic Apostolate as a means of supporting missions, and it was to receive the formal papal approval of Pope Pius IX in 1874. He then founded the Daughters of Charity of the Most Precious Blood on 6 January 1873 and served as a parish priest in Pagani from 1874 to 1887. He wrote a number of publications on a variety of different topics that included moral theology.

He died at the beginning of 1891.

== Beatification ==
The cause for sainthood commenced on a local level and spanned from 2 April 1955 to 10 December 1957. However the formal introduction of the cause came on 31 July 1981. The Positio was sent to the Congregation for the Causes of Saints so that the latter could evaluate whether he lived a life of heroic virtue. Pope John Paul II approved this and declared him to be Venerable on 7 July 2001, and he beatified him on 7 October 2001.
