= Joseph Yuan =

Saint Joseph Yuan
- Born: 1766; Pengshui, Chongqing, Sichuan, Qing China
- Died: 1817 (aged 50–51); Chengdu, Sichuan, Qing China
- Cause of death: Martyrdom
- Beatified: 1900 by Pope Leo XIII
- Canonized: 2000 by Pope John Paul II

Joseph Yuan (Chinese name: 袁在德; 1766 – 1817) was a Chinese priest and martyr of the 19th century.

== Life ==
He was born in 1766 in Pengshui, Chongqing, Sichuan. His Chinese name was Yuan Zaide. When he was young, he heard the preaching of Gabriel-Taurin Dufresse and converted to Christianity. His baptismal name was Joseph.

He felt a calling to the priesthood and studied to become a priest at the Luoranggou mission seminary in Yibin, Sichuan. He was ordained to the priesthood on September 20th 1794. Following his ordination, he worked as a missionary priest in eastern Sichuan.

A wave of persecution against Christians occurred during the reign of the Jiaqing Emperor. During this persecution, Joseph Yuan was arrested and ordered to renounce his faith. He refused and was executed by strangulation on June 24th 1817.

== Canonization ==
He was beatified on May 27, 1900, by Pope Leo XIII and canonized along with other martyrs of China on October 1, 2000, by Pope John Paul II.

== See also ==
- Catholic Church in Sichuan
