= Ernst Oppert =

German businessman

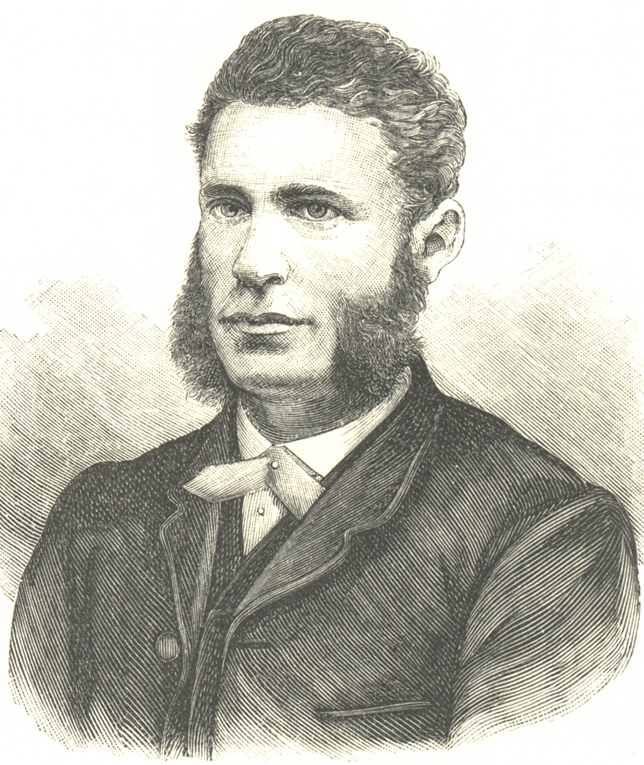
1895 portrait of Oppert

Ernst Jakob Oppert (5 December 1832 – 19 September 1903) was a German businessman best known for his unsuccessful attempt in 1868 to remove the remains of the father of regent Yi Ha-eung from his grave in order to use it to blackmail the regent into removing Korean barriers on foreign trade.

== Life ==
Oppert was born into a wealthy banker family in Hamburg. Two of his brothers, Julius and Gustav, became leading German orientalists, while Ernst opened a trading business in 1851 in Hong Kong. When that company went bankrupt in 1866, he became interested in trading with Korea, which at that time followed a strict isolationist policy and was a hermit kingdom, with a closed market to westerners. Still, Oppert visited Korean shores two times in 1866, without much business success as his efforts were thwarted by Korean emissaries. Although Oppert himself had no experience in learning the Korean language, he judged the Korean language to be much harder to learn than either Chinese or Japanese. Oppert based this judgment on a scarcity of sources as stated below:

The difficulties in acquiring and properly speaking the Corean language are by no means inferior to those which beset the study of the Chinese; they are even considered by many to be infinitely greater, and they cannot be likened to the comparatively easy manner with which even foreigners are able to acquire a knowledge of Japanese in a proportionately short time.

— A Forbidden Land: Voyages to the Corea

== Attempted Robbery of the Tomb of Prince Namyeon ==
Back in Shanghai, Oppert allegedly met a French priest Stanislas Féron (MEP), who had devised a plan to excavate and hold hostage the remains of the father of regent Yi Haeung, who ruled the country for his son, King Gojong, to use them to blackmail him into opening the country for trade. Other accounts alleged that Oppert just sought to rob the royal graves for the gold and precious antiquities that they were supposedly filled with. Financed by the American E. F. B. Jenkins who also participated in the enterprise, Oppert and Féron set out on 30 April 1868 on the ships China and Greta, manned with a crew of about 130. Arriving in Korea on 8 May, they "acquired" two fishing boats from the locals, and proceeded further inlands. When they reached the tomb on 10 May, Oppert's men tried to steal the body, but were stopped by the massive stone slab that covered Prince Namyeon's remains. Being observed by large crowds of Koreans and fearing the arrival of the Korean military, the graverobbers had to leave without having achieved their objective. The stone that had impeded their success was thought to be steel, but it was in fact quicklime. On their second attempt at landing, Oppert's party was engaged by Korean soldiers in a battle where they lost two men and had to retreat. Oppert, Jenkins and Féron then sailed along the coast to Incheon, sending missives to the Korean regent who was not impressed by the promises of impending doom if the westerners were ignored. Running low on fuel, the ships eventually had to flee the country.

The entire incident enraged the Koreans, who were now even less inclined to trade with the foreigners.

Back in China, the ringleaders of the expedition reportedly faced trial. The catholic priest Féron was expulsed from China and was later a missionary in Puducherry, India. Jenkins was set free because of inconclusive evidence of his involvement. Oppert opted to return to Germany, but was sentenced to a three-month prison sentence in Hamburg.

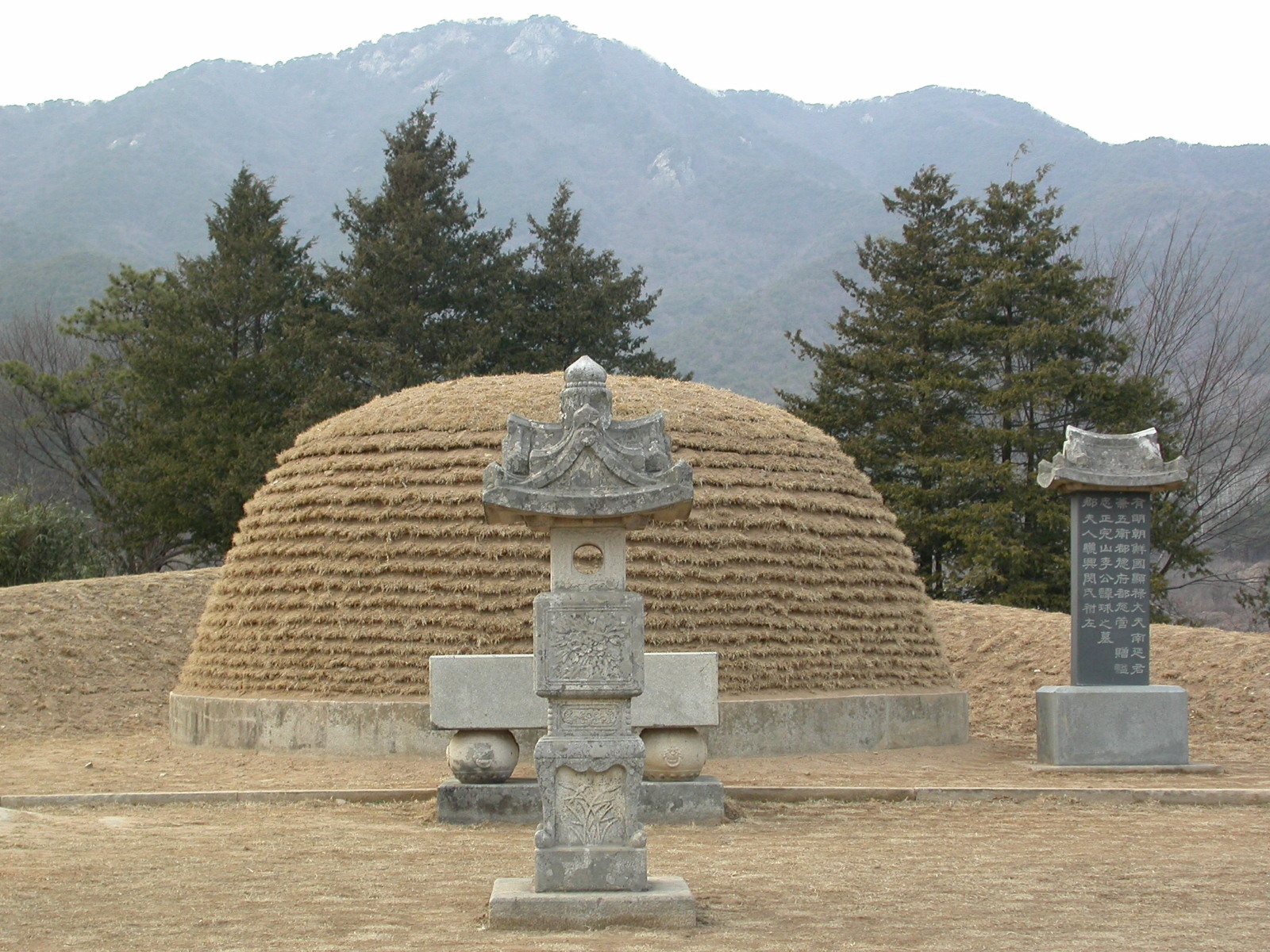
The tomb of Prince Namyeon

According to A. H. S. Landor, the tale of Oppert's unsuccessful tomb raiding was still well known in Korea around the end of the 19th century and was being told to foreigners on arriving, with one member of the raid party allegedly still living in Chemulpo.

== Later life ==
Oppert returned to Germany, where he thereafter had an unremarkable businessman's life. Some sources claim that he spent a few months in jail for this grave robbing episode. In 1880 he published a book about Korea titled Ein verschlossenes Land. Reisen nach Corea. It was originally published by Brockhaus in Leipzig and was also translated into English. Other authors of the time who published about Korea called Oppert out for brazenly publishing about his own international incident, referring to the ″monstrous impertinence″ of his book. Oppert also translated into German a few more books by other authors about Africa and East Asia.

== See also ==
- Germans in Korea

== Works ==
- Ein verschlossenes Land. - Brockhaus, Leipzig 1880 (Digital)
