= Paul Chong Hasang =

Korean Roman Catholic saint and martyr

Saint Paul Chong Hasang

Lay Leader, Korean Martyr
- Born: Chong Hasang; 1794 or 1795; Korea
- Died: 22 September 1839 (aged 44–45); Hanseong, Joseon
- Venerated in: Catholic Church
- Beatified: 6 June 1925 by Pope Pius XI
- Canonized: 6 May 1984 by Pope John Paul II
- Feast: September 20 (Roman calendar, along with The Korean Martyrs)
- Attributes: Hanbok and gat, crucifix, palm of martyrdom
- Patronage: Korea

- Paul Chong Hasang
- Hangul: 정하상
- Hanja: 丁夏祥
- RR: Jeong Hasang
- MR: Chŏng Hasang

Baptismal name
- Hangul: 바오로
- RR: Baoro
- MR: Paoro

Paul Chong Hasang (1794 or 1795–22 September 1839) was a Korean Catholic lay missionary known as one of the Korean Martyrs. His feast day is September 20, and he is also venerated along with the rest of the 103 Korean martyrs on 20 September.

== Life and legacy ==
He was the son of the martyr Augustine Chŏng Yakjong.

When Yakjong was martyred with Hasang's older brother, Yakjong's wife and the remaining children were spared and went into a rural place. Hasang was then seven years old.

When he grew up, Hasang chose to become a servant of a government interpreter; this enabled him to travel to Beijing multiple times, where he entreated the bishop of Beijing to send priests to Korea, and wrote to Pope Gregory XVI via the bishop of Beijing requesting the establishment of a diocese in Korea. This happened in 1825.

Some years later, Bishop Laurent-Marie-Joseph Imbert and two priests were sent. The bishop found Hasang to be talented, zealous, and virtuous; he taught him Latin and theology, and was about to ordain him when a persecution broke out. Hasang was captured and gave the judge a written statement defending Catholicism. The judge, after reading it, said, "You are right in what you have written; but the king forbids this religion, it is your duty to renounce it." Hasang replied, "I have told you that I am a Christian, and will be one until my death."

After this, Hasang went through a series of tortures in which his countenance remained tranquil. Finally, he was bound to a cross on a cart and led to his death, at the age of 45.

The Korean Martyrs are commemorated by the Roman Catholic Church with a memorial on 20 September. 103 of them, including Hasang, were canonized by Pope John Paul II in 1984.

== Bibliography ==
- The Lives of the 103 Korean Martyr Saints (4): St. Chong Ha-sang Paul (1795–1839), Catholic Bishops' Conference of Korea Newsletter No. 29 (Winter 1999).
