= Andrew Kim Taegon =

Korean Catholic saint (1821–1846)

Saint Andrew Kim Taegon
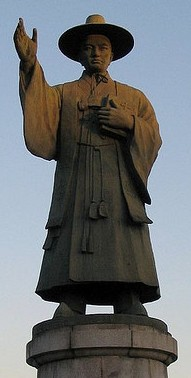
- Statue of Saint Andrew Kim Taegon, the first Korean Catholic priest

Martyr
- Born: 21 August 1821; Solmou, Dangjin, Joseon
- Died: 16 September 1846 (aged 25); Saenamteo, Hansŏng, Joseon
- Venerated in: Catholic Church
- Beatified: 11 September 1925
- Canonized: 6 May 1984 by Pope John Paul II
- Feast: 20 September
- Patronage: Korean clergy

Korean name
- Hangul: 김대건
- Hanja: 金大建
- RR: Gim Daegeon
- MR: Kim Taegŏn

Baptismal name
- Hangul: 안드레아
- RR: Andeurea
- MR: Andŭrea

Andrew Kim Taegon (21 August 1821 – 16 September 1846), also referred to as Andrew Kim in English, was the Korean Catholic priest of the Joseon period and is the patron saint of Korean clergy.

== Biography ==
In the late 18th century, Catholicism began taking root in Korea, having been introduced by scholars who visited China and brought back Western books translated into Chinese. In 1836 Korea saw its first consecrated missionaries (members of the Paris Foreign Missions Society) arrive, only to find out that the people there were already practicing Korean Catholics.

Born into the aristocratic Gimhae Kim clan (Yangban) Kim's parents were converts and his father, uncles, and grandfathers were subsequently martyred for practising Christianity, a prohibited activity in heavily Confucian Korea. After being baptized at age 15, Kim studied at a seminary in the Portuguese colony of Macau. He also spent time in studying at Lolomboy, Bocaue, Bulacan, Philippines, where today he is also venerated. He was ordained a priest in Shanghai after nine years (1844) by the French bishop Jean-Joseph-Jean-Baptiste Ferréol. He then returned to Korea to preach and evangelize. During the Joseon period, Catholicism was suppressed and many were persecuted and executed. Catholics had to practise their faith covertly. Kim was one of thousands who were executed during this time. In 1846, at the age of 25, he was tortured and finally beheaded near Seoul on the Han River. His last words were:

This is my last hour of life, listen to me attentively: if I have held communication with foreigners, it has been for my religion and my God. It is for Him that I die. My immortal life is on the point of beginning. Become Christians if you wish to be happy after death, because God has eternal chastisements in store for those who have refused to know Him.

== Legacy ==
Before Ferréol, the first bishop of Korea, died from exhaustion on 3 February 1853, he wanted to be buried beside Kim, stating, "You will never know how sad I was to lose this young native priest. I have loved him as a father loved his son; it is a consolation for me to think of his eternal happiness."

On 6 May 1984, Pope John Paul II canonized Kim along with 102 other Korean Martyrs, including Paul Chong Hasang, during his trip to Korea. The feast day of Andrew Kim Taegon, Paul Chong Hasang and companions is celebrated on 20 September.

A historical drama depicting Kim's life, A Birth, was released in 2022.

== See also ==
- Shrine of Saint Andrew Kim, Bocaue, Bulacan, Philippines
- St. Andrew Kim Tae Gon Catholic Church, Jakarta, Indonesia

== Bibliography ==
- "The Lives of the 103 Korean Martyr Saints (2): St. Kim Tae-gon Andrew," Catholic Bishops' Conference of Korea Newsletter No. 27 (Summer 1999).
