= Siméon-François Berneux =

French Roman Catholic saint

Saint Siméon-François Berneux
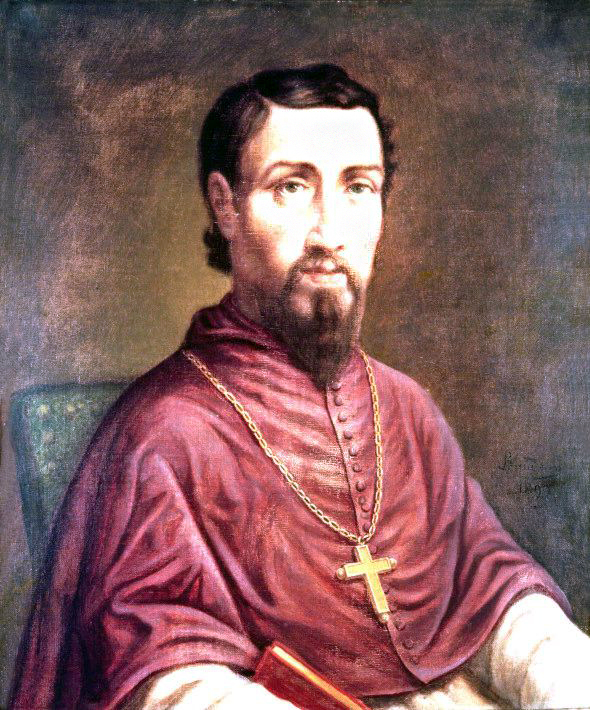

Martyr
- Born: 14 May 1814; Château-du-Loir, French Empire
- Died: April 8, 1866 (aged 51); Saenamteo, Joseon
- Venerated in: Catholic Church
- Beatified: 6 October 1968 by Pope Paul VI
- Canonized: 6 May 1984 by Pope John Paul II
- Feast: 7 March; 20 September (Roman calendar, along with The Korean Martyrs)

Korean name
- Hangul: 장경일
- Hanja: 張敬一
- RR: Jang Gyeongil
- MR: Chang Kyŏngil

Siméon-François Berneux (14 May 1814 – 8 March 1866) was a French Catholic missionary to Asia, and a member of the Paris Foreign Missions Society who was canonized as a saint. Berneux was executed in the anti-Christian purges at Saenamteo, Seoul, Korea, in 1866. His death provoked the French campaign against Korea the same year, which led to Korea reinforcing its ongoing policy of isolationism.

== Biography ==
Siméon-François Berneux was born in Château-du-Loir on 14 May 1814 and entered the Seminary of Foreign Missions in 1831 at the age of seventeen. In 1833 he entered the Seminary of Le Mans to complete his studies. He was ordained on 20 May 1837 and appointed as Professor of Theology at the Foreign Missions Seminary in October 1838.

Berneux departed from Le Havre on 12 February 1840 and arrived at Anyer in Java on 31 May. He spent the summer in Manila before sailing to Macau. In January 1841 he sailed to Tonkin. In Vietnam he was imprisoned and taken to Huế for trial, where he arrived on 28 May. In 1842 he was convicted of proselytism and sentenced to death, a sentence which was indefinitely postponed. He was released on 12 March 1843 and set sail to return to France. However, at the Isle of Bourbon (now Réunion), he received permission to return to Macao. He was appointed to begin missions in Manchuria, and arrived in the Liaodong Peninsula on 15 March 1844.

Berneux was consecrated as bishop on 27 December 1854, appointed titular bishop of Capsus and Apostolic Vicar of Corea. The previous Apostolic Vicar of Korea, Jean-Joseph-Jean-Baptiste Ferréol, had been consecrated in 1843 and ministered in Korea from 1845 until his death in 1853. Berneux sailed from Shanghai to Korea in January 1856 on a Chinese ship, arriving in Korean waters on 15 March. They met a vessel owned by Korean Christians on Good Friday and were landed near Seoul. Entering the city on foot, Berneux and his company were taken to the house of Marie-Nicolas-Antoine Daveluy, a French priest who had come to Korea along with Bishop Ferréol. Berneux set up a residence in Seoul, living and working secretly.

In 1866 Berneux was arrested and put on trial. In February 1866 he was repeatedly interrogated under torture, and sentenced to death. He was executed by decapitation on 8 March 1866 at Saenamteo outside Seoul. Daveluy served as Apostolic Vicar for a short time until he was also executed on 30 March. The deaths of Berneux and other Catholic missionaries in Korea was followed by a French punitive expedition which reinforced the Korean policy of isolationism.

== Canonization ==
Berneux's spiritual writings were approved by theologians on 13 May 1914, and his cause was formally opened on 13 November 1918, granting him the title Servant of God. He was beatified by Pope Paul VI on 6 October 1968 and canonized on 6 May 1984 by Pope John Paul II. His feast day is 7 March, and he is also venerated along with the rest of the 103 Korean Martyrs on 20 September.

His relics were brought to Berlin in 2001 and are held in the Institut St. Philipp Neri in Berlin, Germany.

== Bibliography ==
- The Lives of the 103 Martyr Saints of Korea 37: Saint Siméon François Berneux, Bishop (1814-1866), Catholic Bishops' Conference of Korea Newsletter No. 51 (Summer 2005).
- Frédéric Pichon (1872). The Life of Monseigneur Berneux, Bishop of Capse, Vicar-Apostolic of Corea. Burns, Oates, and Company, London.
- Jones, George Heber (March 1898). "Siméon-François Berneux, Bishop and Martyr". The Korean Repository. 5 (3): 81.

LECLEIR, Stefaan, Siméon-François Berneux (1814-1866), Missionsbischof und Märtyrer in Korea, Böhlau, Köln, 2000.

- Stefaan Lecleir (2005). "Siméon-François Berneux". In Bautz, Traugott (ed.). Biographisch-Bibliographisches Kirchenlexikon (BBKL) (in German). Vol. 24. Nordhausen: Bautz. cols. 232–235. ISBN 3-88309-247-9.
