= Marie-Nicolas-Antoine Daveluy =

French Roman Catholic saint (1818–1866)

Saint Marie-Nicolas-Antoine Daveluy
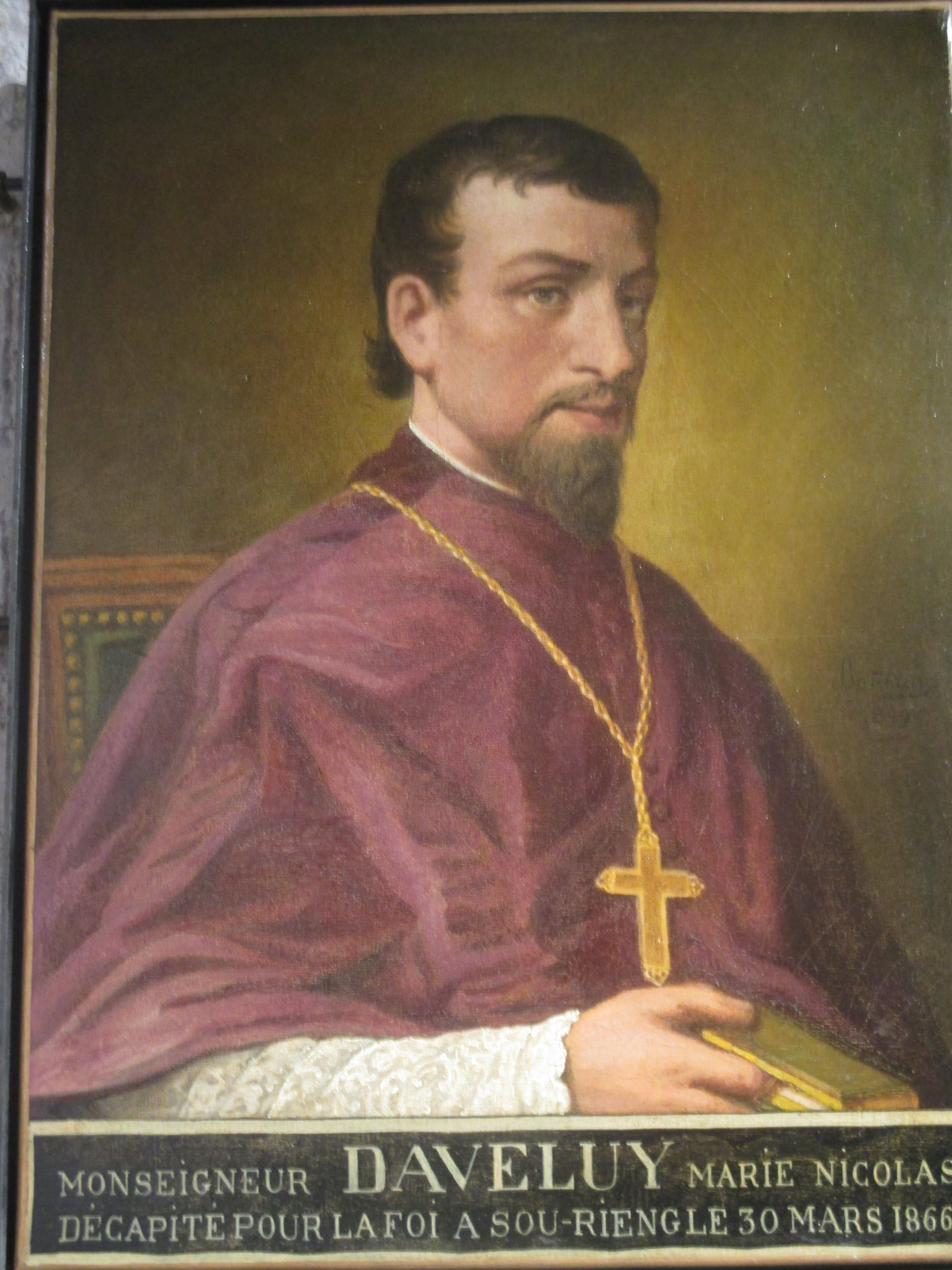

Martyr
- Born: 16 March 1818; Amiens, France
- Died: 30 March 1866 (aged 48); Galmaemot, Joseon
- Venerated in: Roman Catholicism
- Beatified: 6 October 1968
- Canonized: 6 May 1984, Seoul, South Korea by Pope John Paul II
- Major shrine: Galmaemot Martyrium, Boryeong, South Korea
- Feast: 30 March; 20 September (along with other Korean Martyrs)

Marie-Nicolas-Antoine Daveluy (16 March 1818 – 30 March 1866) was a French missionary and saint. His feast day is March 30, and he is also venerated along with the rest of the 103 Korean martyrs on September 20.

== Biography ==
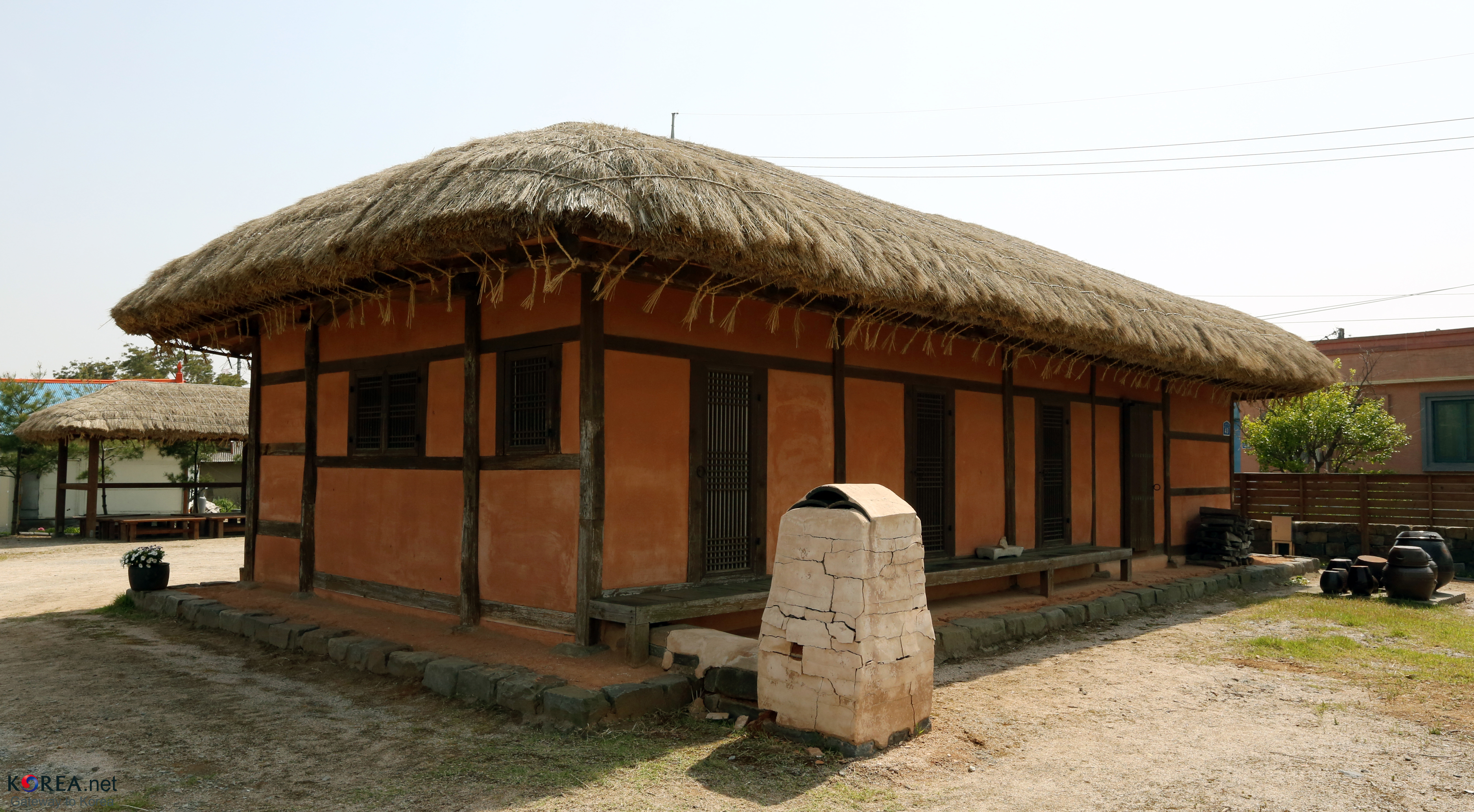
Residence of Bishop Antoine Daveluy between 1845 and 1866 in the village Sin-ri (rural part of Dangjin).

Antoine Daveluy was born 16 March 1818 in Amiens, France. His father was a factory owner, town councilman, and government official. The members of his family were devout Catholics and two of his brothers became priests. He entered the St. Sulpice Seminary in Issy-les-Moulineaux himself in October 1834 and was ordained a priest on 18 December 1841.

His first assignment was as an assistant priest in Roye. Despite poor health, he joined the Paris Foreign Missions Society on 4 October 1843. He departed for East Asia on 6 February 1844, intending to serve as a missionary in the Ryukyu Islands of Japan. He arrived in Macau, where he was persuaded by the newly appointed apostolic vicar of Korea, Jean-Joseph-Jean-Baptiste Ferréol, to accompany him there instead. The two were joined by Andrew Kim Tae-gŏn, a Korean seminarian who had been studying for the priesthood in Macau. They first traveled to Shanghai, where Bishop Ferréol ordained Father Kim on 17 August 1845. The three priests then made a stormy crossing by sea to Korea, arriving in Chungcheong Province in October.

Father Daveluy began work as a missionary in Korea, becoming fluent in the language. He was the most scholarly of the early mission priests. He wrote a Korean-French dictionary and other books about the Catholic Church and its history in Korean. With the assistance of Hwang Sŏk-tu, he wrote A Brief Record of Reflection and First Journey in Divine Life, published in Woodblock print.

On 13 November 1855, Pope Pius IX appointed him titular bishop of Akka and coadjutor to Bishop Siméon-François Berneux, who had been appointed apostolic vicar in 1854 after the death of Bishop Ferréol in 1853. He was consecrated by Bishop Berneux on 25 March 1857.

After Bishop Berneux was executed during a campaign by the Korean government against Christians, Bishop Daveluy became apostolic vicar on 8 March 1866. He was promptly arrested on 11 March. Imprisoned and tortured, he staunchly defended his Catholic faith. Sentenced to death, he asked to be executed on Good Friday 30 March. He was beheaded at a Korean naval base in Galmaemot (갈매못) near present-day Boryeong along with two French priests, Pierre Aumaître and Martin-Luc Huin, and two lay catechists, Lucas Hwang Sŏk-tu (Bishop Daveluy's personal assistant) and Joseph Chang Chu-gi.

All five were canonized on 6 May 1984 along with Father Kim, Bishop Berneux and 96 other Korean martyrs.

The deaths of Berneux, Daveluy and other Catholic missionaries in Korea was followed by a French punitive expedition which reinforced the Korean policy of isolationism.

== See also ==
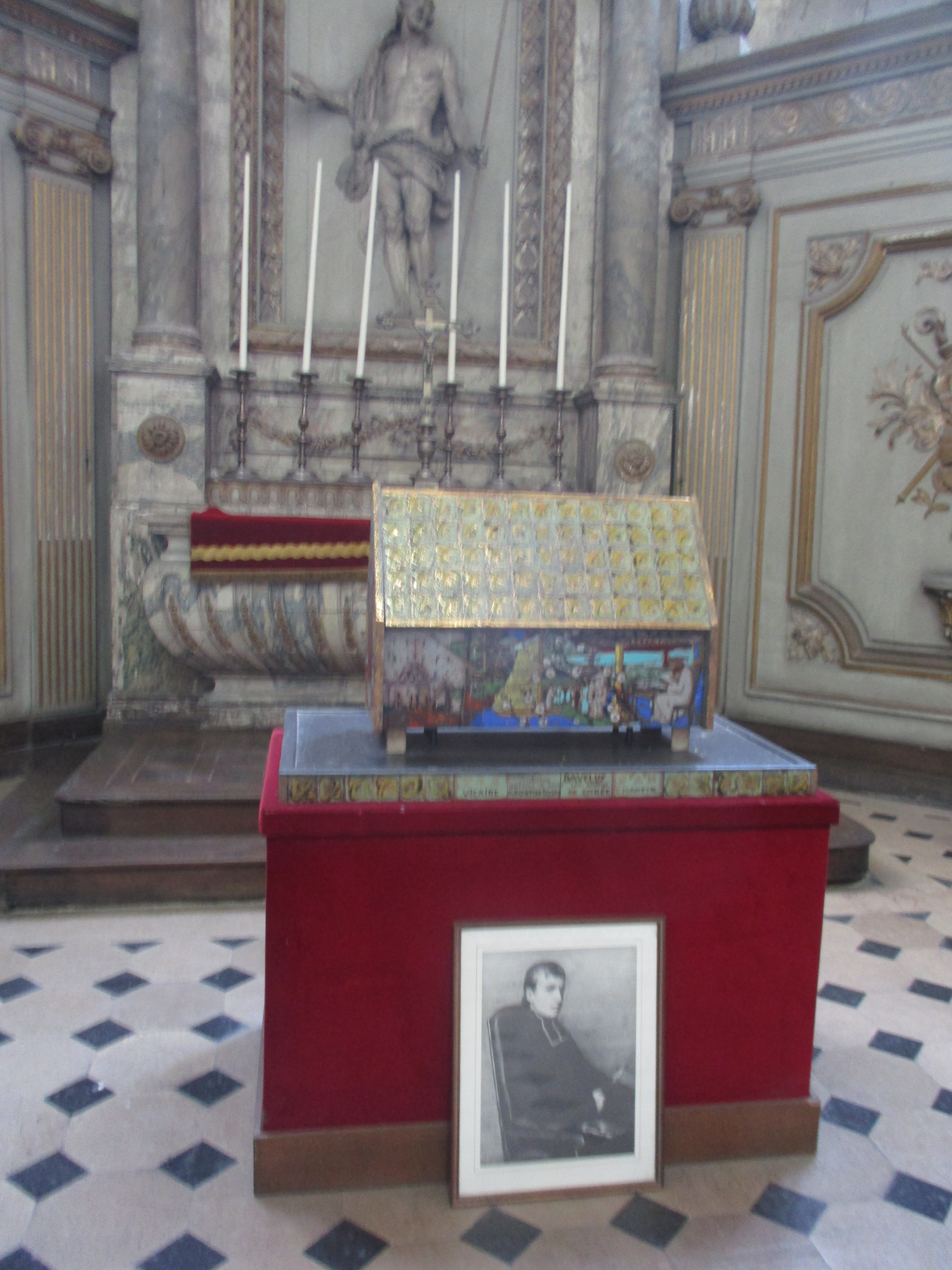
Reliquary of saint Anthony Daveluy in Amiens Cathedral.

- Roman Catholicism in South Korea
- French campaign against Korea (1866)
- Claude-Charles Dallet

== Bibliography ==
- The Lives of the 103 Korean Martyr Saints: Bishop Marie Nicholas Antoine Daveluy (1818-1866), Catholic Bishops' Conference of Korea Newsletter No. 47 (Summer 2004).
- (in Latin) Remigius Ritzler and Pirminus Sefrin (1968). Hierarchia catholica medii et recentioris aevi, vol. 7. Il Messaggero di S. Antonio, Padua. ISBN 978-88-7026-057-1.
- (in Latin) Remigius Ritzler and Pirminus Sefrin (1978). Hierarchia catholica medii et recentioris aevi, vol. 8. Il Messaggero di S. Antonio, Padua. ISBN 978-88-7026-264-3.
- Bishop Anthony Daveluy, Pontifical Society of the Holy Childhood Bulletin 15 (24 March 2009), p. 11.
- (in French) Paul Le Gall (1966). Mgr Antoine Daveluy: témoin du Christ en Corée, 1818-1866. Les Auxiliaires du clergé, Saint-Riquier.
- (in French) Charles Salmon (1883). Vie de Mgr Daveluy: évêque d'Acônes, vicaire apostolique de Corée. Bray et Retaux, Paris.
