= Saint John =

Saint John or St. John usually refers to either John the Baptist or John the Apostle.

Saint John or St. John may also refer to:

== People ==
=== Saints ===
==== In multiple denominations ====
- John the Baptist (c. 6 BC – c. AD 30), preacher, ascetic, and baptizer of Jesus Christ
- John the Evangelist (c. AD 6 – c. 100), presumed author of the Fourth Gospel, traditionally identified with John the Apostle
- John of Patmos, author of the Book of Revelation, traditionally identified with John the Apostle and John the Evangelist
- John the Wonderworking Unmercenary (died c. 304), Egyptian or Mesopotamian healer
- John (died 320), one of the 40 Martyrs of Sebaste
- John the Hieromartyr (died 362), Roman priestmartyr
- John and Paul (died 362), Roman martyrs
- John of Egypt (died 394), Egyptian hermit
- John I of Naples (bishop) (died 5th century), Bishop of Naples
- John the Dwarf (c. 339 – c. 405), Egyptian Desert Father
- John Chrysostom (c. 347 – 407), Antiochene Archbishop of Constantinople
- John Angeloptes (died 433), Bishop of Ravenna from 430 to 433
- John Cassian (360–435), abbot, priest and theologian probably from Scythia-Minor
- John (died c. 447), one of the Seven Sleepers of Ephesus
- John Calybite (died c. 450), Greek monk
- John of Châlon (died 475), Bishop of Chalon-sur-Saône
- John of Ravenna (died 494), Bishop of Ravenna
- John of Chinon (died 6th century), Breton hermit in Chinon and spiritual father of Queen Radegund
- Pope John I (470–526), Italian pope from 523 to 526
- John of Réôme (died c. 539), French abbot and hermit
- John the Prophet (c. 543), Greek Desert Father
- John the Silent (452–558), Bishop of Taxara
- John Scholasticus (died 577), a.k.a. John III of Constantinople, 32nd Patriarch of Constantinople from 565 to 577
- John IV of Constantinople (died 595), a.k.a. John the Faster, first Ecumenical Patriarch of Constantinople from 582 to 595
- John the Merciful (c. 552 – c. 620), Melkite Patriarch of Alexandria and almoner
- John I Agnus ('the Lamb', fl. 7th century), 25th bishop of Tongres
- John of Verona (died 7th century), Bishop of Verona who succeeded Saint Maurus
- John of Syracuse (died c. 609), Bishop of Syracuse from 595 to c. 609
- John the Merciful (died c. 610), Cypriot Patriarch of Alexandria
- John Climacus (579–649), Syrian or Byzantine monk and abbot
- John the Good (bishop of Milan) (died c. 660 or 669), Bishop of Milan
- John of Bergamo (died 690), Bishop of Bergamo from c. 656 – c. 690
- John of Beverley (died 721), Anglian Bishop of York from 705 to 718
- John of Damascus (676–749), a.k.a. John Damascene, Syrian hieromonk
- John of Pavia (died 813), Bishop of Pavia from 801 to 813
- John IV of Naples (died 849), Bishop of Naples from 842 to 849
- John of Tuy (died 9th century), Galician hermit in Tui, Pontevedra, Spain
- John of Rila (876–946), Bulgarian priest and hermit
- John of Gorze (c. 900–974), a.k.a. John of Lorraine; abbot of Gorze Abbey, diplomat and monastic reformer
- Theodore the Varangian and his son John (died c. 978 – c. 988), martyrs
- John Vincent (died 998), a.k.a. John X, Archbishop of Ravenna
- John Gradenigo (died 1025), Venetian nobleman, monk and hermit
- John Angelus (died c. 1050), Venetian monk in Pomposa Abbey
- John of Autun, Bishop of Autun
- John Theristus (1049–1129), Italian Benedictine monk

==== Eastern Orthodox ====
- John V of Constantinople (died 674), Ecumenical Patriarch of Constantinople from 669 to 674
- John of Gothia (died c. 791), Bishop of Gothia (Gothic Crimea)
- John Vladimir (c. 990 –1016), a.k.a. Jovan Vladimir, King of Duklja, megalomartyr, myroblyte and wonderworker
- John VIII of Constantinople (c. 1010–1075), Ecumenical Patriarch of Constantinople from 1064 to 1075
- John of Karpathos (fl. 11th century – c. 14th century), Bishop of Karpathos and writer in the Philokalia
- John of Novgorod (died 1186), Archbishop of Novgorod from 1165 to 1186
- John Kaloktenes (died c. 1190), a.k.a. John the New Merciful, Metropolitan of Thebes
- John the New of Suceava (died 1330), Moldavian megalomartyr and monk; patron saint of Saint John the New Monastery
- John (died 1347), one of the 3 Martyrs of Vilnius
- John Kukuzelis (1280–1360), Byzantine composer, singer and reformer
- John Uroš (1350–1422 or 1423), a.k.a. Joasaph of Meteora, titular Emperor of Serbs and Greeks and monk
- John Branković (c. 1465–1502), a.k.a. John the New; Despot of Serbia
- John the Hairy (died 1580), a.k.a. John the New Merciful, Russian fool for Christ and almoner
- John of Moscow (died c. 1589), Russian fool for Christ and wonderworker
- John of Tobolsk (1651–1715), Metropolitan of Tobolsk and ascetic
- John the Russian (c. 1690–1730), Russian soldier, Ottoman slave and confessor of the faith
- John of Kronstadt (1829–1909), Russian archpriest and synod member
- John of Sonkajanranta (1884–1918), a.k.a. Johannes Karhapää, Finnish Karelian teacher, missionary and new martyr
- John Kochurov (1871–1917), Russian priest, missionary, hieromartyr and protomartyr of the New Martyrs and Confessors of Russia
- John of Valamo (1873–1958), hegumen (abbot) and schemamonk of New Valaam Monastery
- John of Shanghai and San Francisco (1896–1966), a.k.a. John the Wonderworker, Archbishop of Shanghai and San Francisco

==== Oriental Orthodox ====
- John of Ephesus (507–586), Syrian ecclesiastical historian
- John III of the Sedre (died 648), Syriac Orthodox Patriarch of Antioch

==== Roman Catholic ====
===== Martyrs =====
====== Forty Martyrs of England and Wales ======
- John Houghton (martyr) (1486–1535), English abbot
- John Stone (martyr) (died 1539), English friar
- John Rigby (martyr) (died 1600), English martyr
- John Roberts (martyr) (c. 1577 – 1610), Welsh priest and prior of Saint Gregory's
- John Southworth (martyr) (1592–1654), English priest
- John Kemble (martyr) (1599–1679), English priest
- John Wall (priest and martyr) (1620–1679), English priest
- John Plessington (c. 1637–1679), English priest
- Saint John Lloyd (died 1679), Welsh priest
- John Payne (martyr) (1532–1582), English priest
- John Boste (1544–1594), English priest
- John Jones (martyr) (died 1598), Welsh priest

====== North American Martyrs ======
- Jean de Lalande (died 1646), French missionary
- Jean de Brébeuf (1593–1649), French missionary

====== Vietnamese Martyrs ======
- John Dat (c. 1765–1798), Vietnamese priest
- John Charles Cornay (1809–1837), a.k.a. Jean-Charles Cornay, French missionary and martyr
- John Thanh Van Dinh (1796–1840), Vietnamese martyr
- John Gabriel Perboyre (1802–1840), a.k.a. Jean-Gabriel Perboyre, French missionary
- John Baptist Con (1805–1840), Vietnamese martyr

====== Korean Martyrs ======
- John Baptist Y (1800–1839), Korean martyr

===== Other Roman Catholic saints =====
- John Gualbert (died 1073), founder of the Vallumbrosan Order
- John of Pulsano (1070–1139), a.k.a. Giovanni di Matera, Italian abbot
- John of Meda (1100–1159), Italian priest
- John of the Grating (1098–1168), Bishop of Aleth
- John of Tufara (1084–1170), Italian monastery founder
- John of Matha (1160–1213), French priest and founder of the Trinitarian Order
- John of Nepomuk (1340–1393), Bohemian vicar general of Jan of Jenštejn
- John of Capistrano (1386–1456), Italian friar, summoner of European troops for the 1456 siege of Belgrade
- John Cantius (1390–1473), Polish priest and theologian
- John of Sahagún (1419–1479), Spanish priest
- John Fisher (c. 1469 – 1535), English cardinal and martyr
- Juan Diego (1474–1548), Nahua peasant said to have witnessed apparitions of Our Lady of Guadelupe
- John of God (1495–1550), Portuguese friar; founder of the Brothers Hospitallers of St. John of God
- John of Ávila (1500–1569), Spanish Jewish converso priest, missionary and mystic
- John of the Cross (1542–1591), Spanish Jewish converso friar, priest and mystic; joint founder of the Discalced Carmelites
- John Leonardi (1541–1609), Italian priest; founder of the Clerks Regular of the Mother of God of Lucca
- John de Ribera (1532–1611), a.k.a. Juan de Ribera, Bishop of Valencia
- John Ogilvie (saint) (1579–1615), Scottish priest and martyr
- John Sarkander (1576–1620), Polish priest and martyr
- John Berchmans (1599–1621), Flemish seminarian
- John Francis Regis (1597–1640), French priest
- John Macias (1585–1645), Spanish missionary
- John Eudes (1601–1680), a.k.a. Jean Eudes, French priest and founder of the Congregation of Jesus and Mary
- John de Britto (1647–1693), Portuguese missionary and martyr
- Jean-Baptiste de La Salle (1651–1719), French priest; founder of the Institute of the Brothers of the Christian Schools
- John Joseph of the Cross (1654–1739), Ischian friar, priest and Vicar Provincial of the Alcantarine Reform in Italy
- Jean Vianney (1786–1859), French priest and confessor
- John Neumann (1811–1860), Bohemian missionary, Bishop of Philadelphia and founder of the first American Catholic diocesan school system
- John Hoan Trinh Doan (c. 1789/1798–1861), Vietnamese priest and martyr
- John Bosco (1815–1888), Italian priest and educator; founder of the Salesians of Don Bosco and the Salesian Cooperators
- John Henry Newman (1801–1890), English Oratorian priest and convert from Anglicanism
- Pope John XXIII (1881–1963), Italian pope from 1958 to 1963
- Pope John Paul II (1920–2005), Polish pope from 1978 to 2005

=== Other people ===
- St John (name), a list of people and fictional characters with the given name or surname

== Places ==
=== Canada ===
- Saint John (electoral district), New Brunswick
- Saint John, New Brunswick, a port city on the Bay of Fundy
- Saint John River (Bay of Fundy), a river flowing through Saint John, New Brunswick
- Roman Catholic Diocese of Saint John, New Brunswick, a suffragan of the Archdiocese of Moncton

=== United States ===
- Saints John, Colorado, or Saint John, a former mining town
- St. John, Florida
- St. John, Indiana
- Saint John, Warrick County, Indiana
- St. John, Kansas
- Saint John, Kentucky
- Saint John Plantation, Maine
- Saint John River (Bay of Fundy), from northern Maine into Canada
- St. John, Missouri
- St. John, Pulaski County, Missouri
- St. John, North Dakota
- St. John, Utah, Rush Valley, Utah
- Saint John, Austin, Texas, a neighborhood
- St. John, Washington
- St. John, Wisconsin
- Saint John, U.S. Virgin Islands, an island in the Caribbean Sea
- Saint John, Saint Croix, U.S. Virgin Islands, a small town on Saint Croix
- St. John Township (disambiguation)

=== Elsewhere ===
- Saint John Parish, Antigua and Barbuda, a parish on the island of Antigua
- Saint John Parish, Barbados
- Saint John Parish, Dominica
- Saint John Parish, Grenada
- Saint John, Jersey, a parish of Jersey in the Channel Islands
- Saint John, Malacca, original name of the Portuguese settlement in Malaysia
- Saint John, Malta
- St John, Cornwall, England

== Other uses ==
- St John Ambulance, a foundation established by the Order of St. John
- Order of Saint John (chartered 1888), a royal order of chivalry established in 1831
- St. John (clothing), a luxury American fashion brand
- St. John (crater), an eroded lunar impact crater on the Moon's far side
- St. John (restaurant), Smithfield, London
- St. John Publications, a defunct American magazine and Golden Age comic book publisher
- "St. John", a song by Aerosmith from the 1987 album Permanent Vacation

== See also ==
- St John (name), a list of people and fictional characters with the given name or surname
- Saint Jhn, American musician
- John the Divine (disambiguation)
- Saint John Cemetery (disambiguation)
- Saint John's (disambiguation)
- St. John the Baptist (disambiguation)
- Agios Ioannis (disambiguation) (Greek)
- Saint Juan (disambiguation) (Spanish)
- Saint-Jean (disambiguation) (French)
- San Giovanni (disambiguation) (Italian)
- San Juan (disambiguation) (Spanish)
- Sankt Johann (disambiguation) (German)
- Sant Joan (disambiguation) (Catalan)
- São João (disambiguation) (Portuguese)
- Sveti Ivan (disambiguation) (Croatian)
