= St. John's Cemetery =

St. John Cemetery may refer to:

- St. John Cemetery, Cincinnati, Ohio
- St. John Cemetery, Queens, New York

St. John's Cemetery may refer to:

- St. John's Cemetery (Dubuque), Iowa
- St. John's Cemetery, Frederick, Maryland
- Saint Johns Cemetery, Union County, South Dakota
- St. John's Cemetery, Halifax, Nova Scotia

== See also ==
- New St. John's Cemetery
- Old St. John's Cemetery
- Saint John (disambiguation)
