= Jean-Charles Cornay =

French missionary and martyr

Saint Jean-Charles Cornay M.E.P.
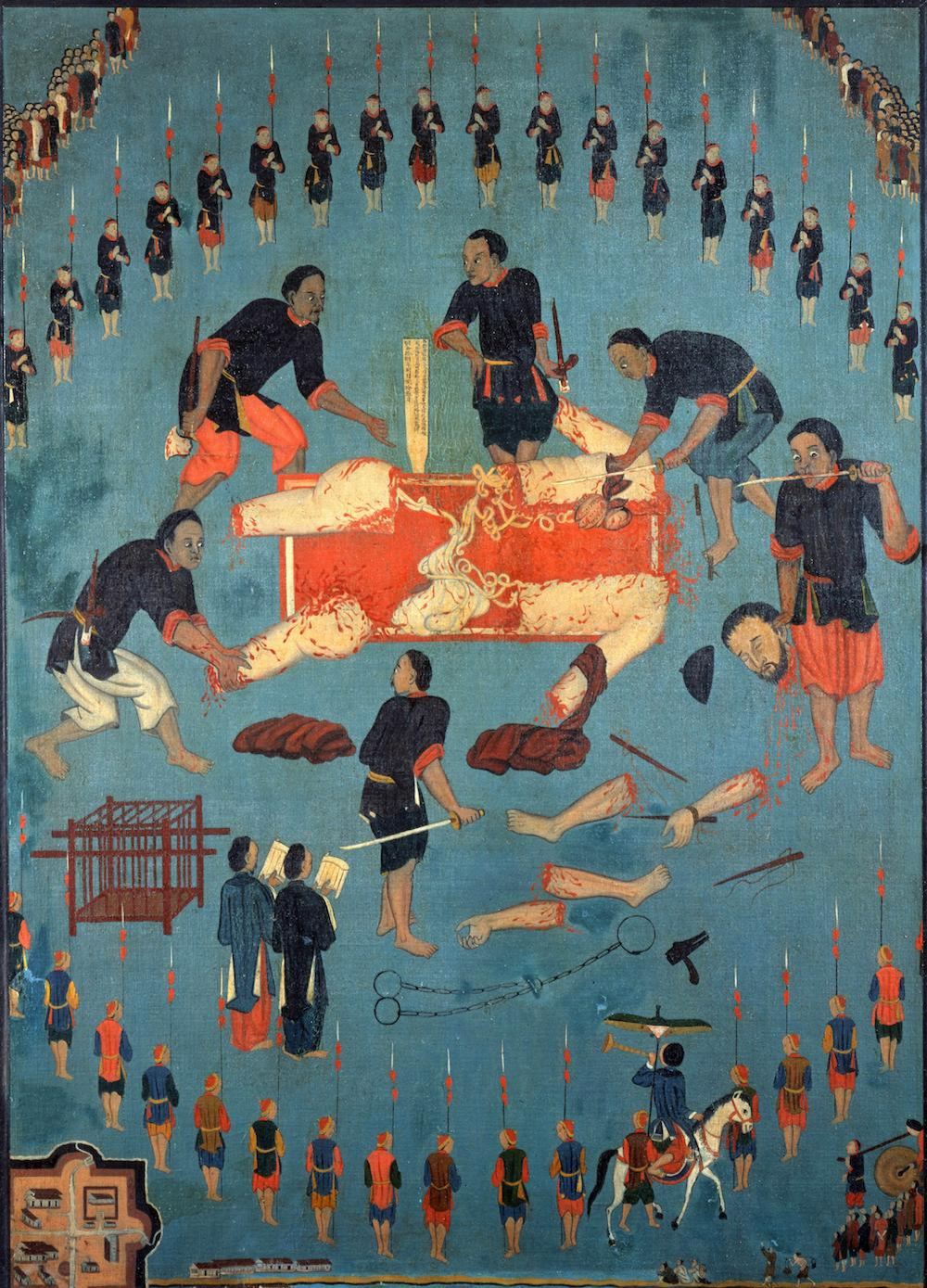
- Martyrdom of St. Jean-Charles Cornay, M.E.P.

Priest and martyr
- Born: 27 February 1809; Loudun, Vienne, France
- Died: 20 September 1837 (aged 28); Son Tay, Tonkin, Vietnam
- Beatified: 27 May 1900 by Pope Leo XIII
- Canonized: 19 June 1988 by Pope John-Paul II
- Feast: 20 September

Jean-Charles Cornay (French pronunciation: [ʒɑ̃ ʃaʁl kɔʁnɛ]; 27 February 1809 – 20 September 1837) was a French missionary of the Paris Foreign Missions Society who was martyred in Vietnam. He was executed in Ha Tay, Tonkin, now Vietnam, during the persecutions of Emperor Minh Mạng.

Cornay was beatified on 27 May 1900, and canonized by Pope John Paul II on 19 June 1988. A town in France still carries his name.

== Biography ==
He was born in Loudun, Vienne, France, the third child of Jean-Baptiste Cornay (born 1777) and Françoise Mayaud (1780–1857); he had one brother, Eugène (1817–1893), and three sisters: Élisabeth (1804–1871), Olympe (1806–1888), and Louise (1821–1890). Their parents brought them up as good Catholics. Jean-Charles was baptized on 3 March 1809 in the Church of Saint-Pierre-du-Marché in Loudun. His godparents were Henri Mayaud and Thérèse Cornay, his aunt.

Cornay studied first at the school Saint-Louis in Saumur, then in the Jesuit minor seminary in Montmorillon, after which he studied at the major seminary of Poitiers. He was known as a normal student, humble and with a gentle disposition.

At Poitiers, Cornay received the tonsure on 1 June 1828 and Minor Orders on 14 June 1829. He was installed as a sub-deacon on 6 June 1830 in the Cathedral of Sts. Peter and Paul of Poitiers.

After he completed his theological studies, Corday left Poitiers to enter the seminary of the Paris Foreign Missions Society on 13 October 1830. His missionary vocation was met with reluctance and misunderstanding on the part of his parents. This his first struggle to be faithful to God's call put him in opposition to the wishes of his parents, while maintaining his filial love. To his mother he said: "Just let me go to Paris, I will have at least three years there with every opportunity to examine my vocation, and all the means of preparing for it if it is authentic". But his stay at the Foreign Missions Seminary in Paris was brief, due to periods of insecurity following the July Revolution. The seminary was targeted; Cornay wrote in his diary: "Yesterday our seminary was invaded and seven or eight posters were put up, proclaiming ‘Death to the Jesuits of the Rue du Bac', and a dagger as signature".

Corday was ordained a deacon in 1831 and left France to go to the Sichuan province of China. His departure was hurried because of the need to replace another missionary. His intended destination was Sichuan (formerly spelled Szechwan), a province in western China, some 1,250 miles from the coast. After six months of travel he landed in Macau, in Tonkin, in the midst of the violent persecution of 1831. Two guides had been sent to accompany him up the Yang-Tse-Kiang to reach Sichuan, but they never arrived. Cornay was stuck in Tonkin.

Cornay was secretly ordained to the priesthood three years later on 26 April 1834 by Bishop Joseph-Marie-Pélagie Havard, Coadjutor Apostolic Vicar of Western Tonkin, after traveling along the Red River disguised as a Chinese. In January 1836, he was told in a letter from the Apostolic Vicar of Szechwan that it was impossible to send him new guides, and gave him the choice between remaining in Tonkin or returning to Macao. With no hope of reaching China from Tonkin, he chose to stay there. In his grueling ministry he was always calm, even joyous. Even his deteriorating health did nothing to reduce his faith.

Cornay was arrested in 1837, accused of being the leader of an evil sect and of fomenting a rebellion. He was subjected to the cangue (a wooden torture collar) and then the cage. His response to torture was to sing. "After fifty blows I was untied. Arriving at the prison, I sang the Salve Regina, the hymn to the Virgin".

He was sentenced to death by lang-tri. On 20 September 1837, as decreed by the Emperor Minh Mang, he was dismembered and beheaded near the Son-Tay citadel, not far from Hanoi. The executioner tore out his liver, took a piece of it and ate it. His head was displayed for three days and then thrown into the river.

In the midst of all kinds of difficulties and even when facing death, Cornay proclaimed his faith: "The Lord is faithful: he expects from us a total trust in his promises". He wrote to his parents: "When you receive this letter, my dear father, my dear mother, do not grieve for my death; by consenting to my departure, you have already made most of the sacrifice". His remains are in the church at Chieu-Ung.

Cornay's attempts at missionary work in Vietnam were in direct defiance of Vietnamese law at the time, a fact of which he was aware.

Cornay's example occasioned the vocation of Théophane Vénard (1829–1861), who was among those canonized the same day as he.

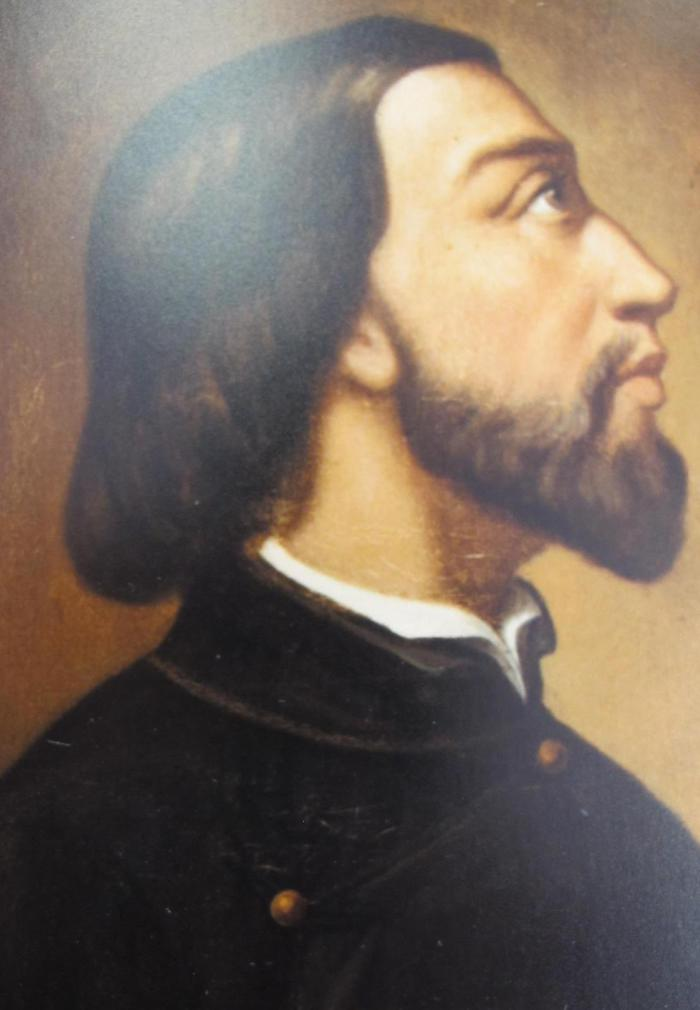
Jean-Charles Cornay.

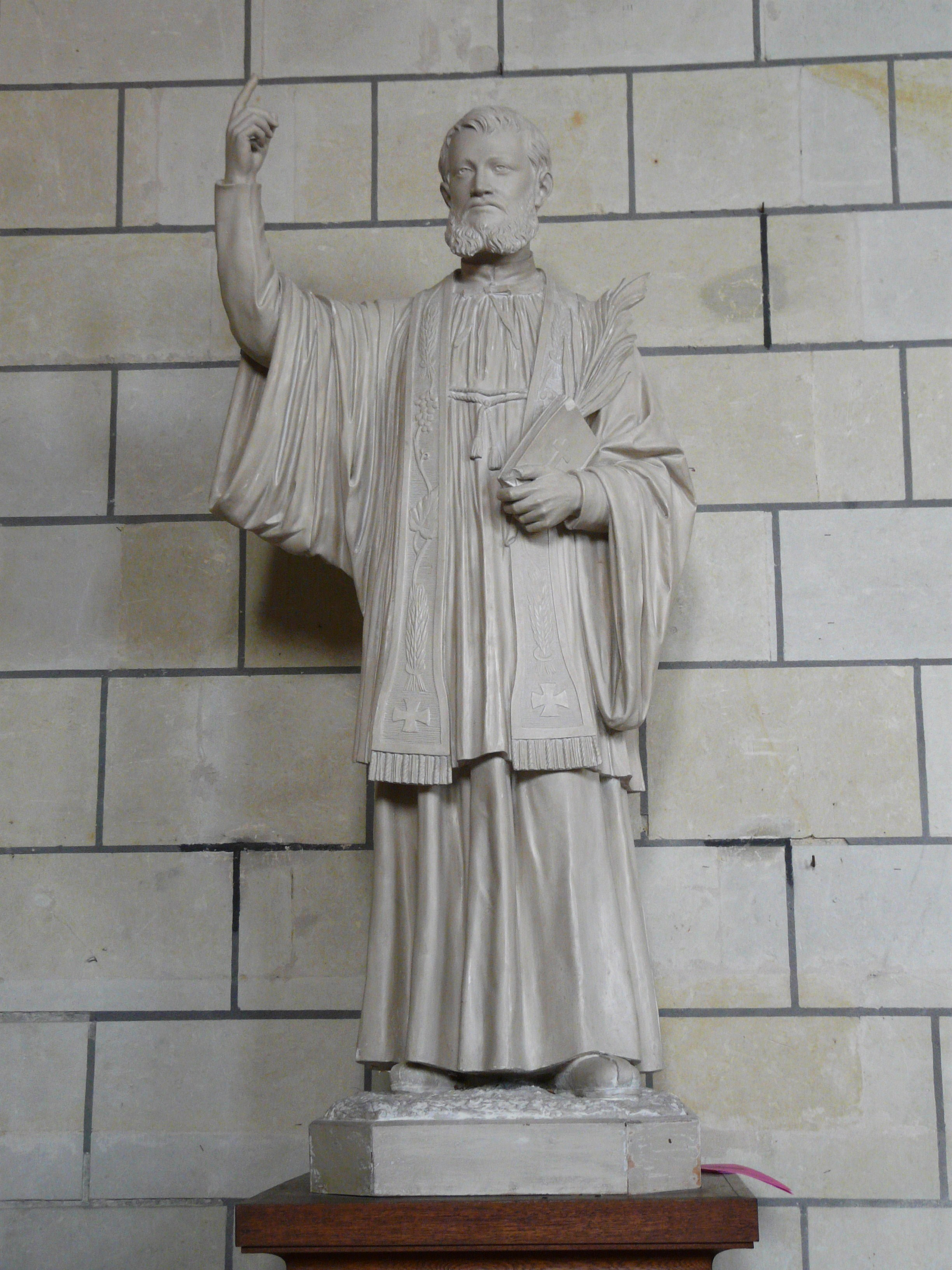
Statue of Jean-Charles Cornay, in the church of Saint-Pierre du Marché, Loudun.

Cornay was declared Venerable on 19 June 1840 by Pope Gregory XVI. He was included in the Martyrology on 2 July 1899 by Pope Leo XIII after he had been beatified by that pope on 27 May 1900. He was canonized by Pope John Paul II on 19 June 1988 as one of the 117 Martyrs of Vietnam, whose feast day is celebrated on 24 November.

== See also ==
- Catholic Church in Sichuan
- Catholic Church in Vietnam
- France-Vietnam relations
