= Vietnamese Martyrs =

Catholic saints who died between 1745 and 1862

Saints Vietnamese Martyrs
- Died: 1745–1862, present-day Vietnam
- Martyred by: Vietnamese rulers (Trịnh, Tây Sơn, and Nguyễn dynasties)
- Means of martyrdom: varies (from dying in prison to death by a thousand cuts)
- Venerated in: Catholic Church
- Beatified: May 27, 1900, by Pope Leo XIII; May 20, 1906 & May 2, 1909, by Pope Pius X; April 29, 1951, by Pope Pius XII
- Canonized: June 19, 1988, Vatican City, by Pope John Paul II
- Major shrine: Basilica of the Immaculate Conception (Sở Kiện), Hà Nam, Vietnam
- Feast: 24 November (General Roman Calendar); 33rd Sunday in Ordinary Time (Vietnam); First Sunday in September (pre-canonization)
- Patronage: Vietnam

Vietnamese Martyrs (Vietnamese: Các Thánh Tử đạo Việt Nam), also known as the Martyrs of Tonkin and Cochinchina, collectively Martyrs of Annam or formerly Martyrs of Indochina, are saints of the Catholic Church who died between 1745 and 1862, and were canonized by Pope John Paul II. On June 19, 1988, thousands of overseas Vietnamese worldwide gathered at St. Peter's Square for the celebration of the canonization of 117 Vietnamese Martyrs, an event organized by Monsignor Trần Văn Hoài. Their memorial in the current General Roman Calendar, which refers to Saint Andrew Dũng-Lạc and Companions (Vietnamese pronunciation: [zʊwŋ͡m laːk̚]), is on November 24, although many of these saints have a second memorial, having been beatified and inscribed on the local calendar prior to the canonization of the group.

The Vatican estimates the number of Vietnamese martyrs at between 130,000 and 300,000. John Paul II decided to canonize both those whose names are known and unknown, giving them a single feast day.

== History ==
The Vietnamese Martyrs fall into several groupings: those of the Dominican and Jesuit missionary era of the 18th century, and those killed in the politically inspired persecutions of the 19th century. A representative sample of only 117 martyrs, including 96 Vietnamese, 11 Spanish Dominicans, and 10 French members of the Paris Foreign Missions Society (Missions Etrangères de Paris; MEP), were beatified on four separate occasions: 64 by Pope Leo XIII on May 27, 1900; eight by Pope Pius X on May 20, 1906; 20 by Pope Pius X on May 2, 1909; and 25 by Pope Pius XII on April 29, 1951.

All 117 of these Vietnamese Martyrs were canonized on June 19, 1988. From 1925 to 1990, the Vietnamese Church commemorated the feast of the Vietnamese Martyrs on the first Sunday of September. The memorial was then assigned to 24 November in the General Roman Calendar. A young Vietnamese Martyr, Andrew of Phú Yên, was beatified in March 2000, by Pope John Paul II. Phú Yên is also known as the protomartyr or first martyr of Vietnam with his execution on July 26, 1644, at the age of 19.

=== Martyrs of the Dominican and Jesuit missionary era of the 18th century ===
Six of the canonised martyrs died during the 18th century.

=== The Nguyễn persecution in the 19th century ===
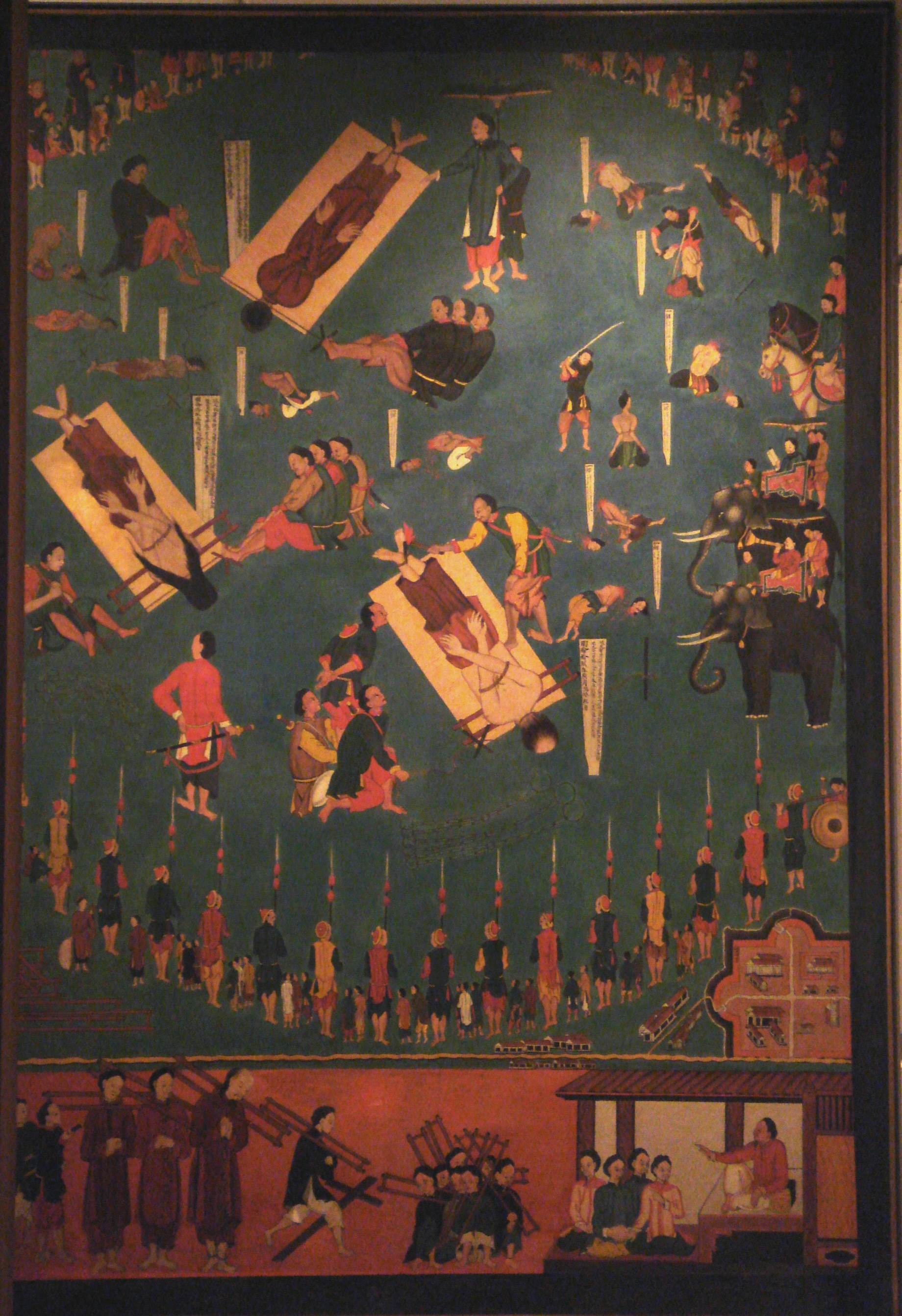
Vietnamese martyrs Paul Mi, Pierre Duong, Pierre Truat, martyred on 18 December 1838

The Catholic Church in Vietnam was devastated during the Tây Sơn rebellion in the late 18th century. During the turmoil, the missions revived, however, as a result of cooperation between the French Vicar Apostolic Pigneaux de Behaine and Nguyen Anh. After Nguyen's victory in 1802, he was grateful for the assistance received and ensured protection for missionary activities. However, only a few years into the new emperor's reign, there was growing antipathy among officials against Catholicism and missionaries reported that it was purely for political reasons that their presence was tolerated. Tolerance continued until the death of the emperor and the new emperor, Minh Mang, succeeding to the throne in 1820.

Converts began to be harassed by local governments without official edicts in the late 1820s. In 1831, the emperor passed new laws regulating religious groupings in Vietnam, and Catholicism was then officially prohibited. In 1832, the first act occurred in a largely Catholic village near Hue, with the entire community being incarcerated and sent into exile in Cambodia. In January 1833, a new kingdom-wide edict was passed calling on Vietnamese subjects to reject the religion of Jesus and required suspected Catholics to demonstrate their renunciation by walking on a wooden cross. Actual violence against Catholics, however, did not occur until the Lê Văn Khôi revolt.

During the rebellion, a young French missionary priest, Joseph Marchand, was sick and residing in the rebel citadel of Gia Dinh. In October 1833, an officer of the emperor reported to the court that a foreign Christian religious leader was present in the citadel. This news was used to justify the edicts against Catholicism and led to the first executions of missionaries in over 40 years. The first executed was named Francois Gagelin. Marchand was eventually captured and executed as a "rebel leader" in 1835; he was put to death by "slow slicing". Further repressive measures were introduced in the wake of this episode in 1836. Before 1836, village heads had only to report to local mandarins about how their subjects had recanted Catholicism. However, after 1836, officials could visit villages and force all the villagers to line up one by one to trample on a cross, and if a community was suspected of harboring a missionary, militia could block off the village gates and perform a rigorous search; if a missionary was found, collective punishment could be meted out to the entire community.

Missionaries and Catholic communities were able to escape punishment through bribery of officials on occasion; they were also sometimes victims of extortion attempts by people who demanded money under the threat that they would report the villages and missionaries to the authorities. The missionary Father Pierre Duclos said:

with gold bars murder and theft blossom among honest people.

The court became more aware of the problem of the failure to enforce the laws and applied greater pressure on its officials to act; officials who failed to act or those who were seen to be acting too slowly were demoted or removed from office (and sometimes were given severe corporal punishment), while those who attacked and killed the Christians could receive promotion or other rewards. Lower officials or younger family members of officials were sometimes tasked with secretly going through villages to report on hidden missionaries or Catholics who had not apostatized.

The first missionary arrested during this (and later executed) was the priest Jean-Charles Cornay in 1837. A military campaign was conducted in Nam Dinh after letters were discovered in a shipwrecked vessel bound for Macao. Quang Tri and Quang Binh officials captured several priests along with the French missionary Bishop Pierre Dumoulin-Borie in 1838 (who was executed). The court translator, Francois Jaccard, a Catholic who had been kept as a prisoner for years and was extremely valuable to the court, was executed in late 1838; the official who was tasked with this execution, however, was almost immediately dismissed.

A priest, Father Ignatius Delgado, was captured in the village of Can Lao (Nam Định Province), put in a cage on public display for ridicule and abuse, and died of hunger and exposure while waiting for execution; the officer and soldiers that captured him were greatly rewarded (about 3 kg of silver was distributed out to all of them), as were the villagers that had helped to turn him over to the authorities. The bishop Dominic Henares was found in Giao Thuy district of Nam Dinh (later executed); the villagers and soldiers that participated in his arrest were also greatly rewarded (about 3 kg of silver distributed). The priest, Father Joseph Fernandez, and a local priest, Nguyen Ba Tuan, were captured in Kim Song, Nam Dinh; the provincial officials were promoted, the peasants who turned them over were given about 3 kg of silver and other rewards were distributed. In July 1838, a demoted governor attempting to win back his place did so successfully by capturing the priest Father Dang Dinh Vien in Yen Dung, Bac Ninh province. (Vien was executed). In 1839, the same official captured two more priests: Father Dinh Viet Du and Father Nguyen Van Xuyen (also both executed).

Pope Gregory XVI wrote to the faithful of the Apostolic vicariates of Tonkin and Cochinchina in August 1839 to express his shock at these executions and to offer consolation to those who remained, and spoke in similar terms to the Cardinals assembled in consistory in April 1840, referring to a number of specific missionaries and local converts executed for their faith.

In Nhu Ly near Hue, an elderly Catholic doctor named Simon Hoa was captured and executed. He had been sheltering a missionary named Charles Delamotte, whom the villagers had pleaded with him to send away. The village was also supposed to erect a shrine for the state-cult, which the doctor also opposed. His status and age protected him from being arrested until 1840 when he was put on trial, and the judge pleaded (due to his status in Vietnamese society as both an elder and a doctor) with him to publicly recant; when he refused, he was publicly executed.

A peculiar episode occurred in late 1839, when a village in Quảng Ngãi province called Phuoc Lam was victimized by four men who extorted cash from the villagers under threat of reporting the Christian presence to the authorities. The governor of the province had a Catholic nephew who told him about what happened, and the governor then found the four men (caught smoking opium) and had two executed as well as two exiled. When a Catholic lay leader then came to the governor to offer their gratitude (thus perhaps exposing what the governor had done), the governor told him that those who had come to die for their religion should now prepare themselves and leave something for their wives and children; when news of the whole episode came out, the governor was removed from office for incompetence.

Many officials preferred to avoid execution because of the threat to social order and harmony it represented, and resorted to use of threats or torture in order to force Catholics to recant. Many villagers were executed alongside priests according to mission reports. The emperor died in 1841, and this offered respite for Catholics. However, some persecution still continued after the new emperor took office. Catholic villages were forced to build shrines to the state cult. The missionary Father Pierre Duclos (quoted above) died in prison in after being captured on the Saigon river in June 1846. The boat he was traveling in, unfortunately contained the money that was set for the annual bribes of various officials (up to 1/3 of the annual donated French mission budget for Cochinchina was officially allocated to 'special needs') in order to prevent more arrests and persecutions of the converts; therefore, after his arrest, the officials then began wide searches and cracked down on the Catholic communities in their jurisdictions. The amount of money that the French mission societies were able to raise made the missionaries a lucrative target for officials that wanted cash, which could even surpass what the imperial court was offering in rewards. This created a cycle of extortion and bribery which lasted for years.

The letters and example of Théophane Vénard inspired the young Saint Thérèse of Lisieux to volunteer for the Carmelite nunnery at Hanoi, though she ultimately contracted tuberculosis and could not go. In 1865, Vénard's body was transferred to his Congregation's church in Paris, but his head remains in Vietnam.

Christians at the time were branded on the face with the words "tả đạo" (左道, lit. "unorthodox religion") and families and villages which subscribed to Christianity were obliterated.

== List of Vietnamese Martyrs ==
Those whose names are known are listed below:

- Andrew Trần An Dũng-Lạc, Vietnamese priest
- Andrew Nguyễn Kim Thông, catechist
- Andrew Trần Văn Trông, layman and soldier
- Andrew Tường, layman
- Anthony Nguyễn Đích, layman
- Anthony Nguyễn Hữu Quỳnh, layman and doctor
- Agnes Lê Thị Thành, laywoman
- Augustine Schoffler Ðông MEP, French priest
- Augustine Phan Viết Huy TOP, layman and soldier
- Augustine Nguyễn Văn Mới TOP, layman
- Bernard Vũ Văn Duệ, Vietnamese priest
- Dominic Cẩm TOP, Vietnamese priest
- Dominic Đinh Đạt, layman and soldier
- Dominic Nguyễn Văn Hạnh OP, Vietnamese priest
- Dominic Henares Minh OP, Spanish bishop
- Dominic Huyên, layman and fisherman
- Dominic Phạm Trọng Khảm TOP, layman and local judge
- Dominic Nguyễn Ðức Mạo, layman
- Dominic Mậu OP, Vietnamese priest
- Dominic Nguyên, layman
- Dominic Nhi, layman
- Dominic Ninh, layman
- Dominic Trần Văn Toại, layman and fisherman
- Dominic Trạch-Đoài OP, Vietnamese priest
- Dominic Vũ Đình Tước OP, Vietnamese priest
- Dominic Bùi Văn Úy TOP, catechist
- Dominic Nguyễn Văn Xuyên OP, Vietnamese priest
- Emmanuel Lê Văn Phụng, layman
- Emmanuel Nguyễn Văn Triệu, Vietnamese priest
- Francis Đỗ Văn Chiểu TOP, catechist
- Francis Gil de Frederich Tế OP, Spanish priest
- Francis Isidore Gagelin Kính MEP, French priest
- Francis Jaccard Phan MEP, French priest
- Francis Trần Văn Trung, layman and military officer
- Francis Xavier Cần, catechist
- Francis Xavier Hà Trọng Mậu TOP, catechist
- Ignatius Clement Delgado Y OP, Spanish bishop
- Hyacinth Casteñeda Gia OP, Spanish priest
- James Ðỗ Mai Năm, Vietnamese priest
- Jerome Hermosilla Liêm-Vọng OP, Spanish bishop
- John Théophane Vénard Ven MEP, French priest
- John Baptist Cỏn, layman
- John Baptist Ðinh Văn Thành, catechist
- John Ðạt, Vietnamese priest
- John Ðoàn Trịnh Hoan, Vietnamese priest
- John Charles Cornay Tân MEP, French priest
- John Louis Bonnard Hương MEP, French priest
- Joseph Ðặng Ðình Viên, Vietnamese priest
- Joseph Ðỗ Quang Hiển OP, Vietnamese priest
- Joseph Fernández de Ventosa Hiền OP, Spanish priest
- Joseph Hoàng Lương Cảnh TOP, layman and doctor
- Joseph Lê Ðăng Thị, layman and military officer
- Joseph Marchand Du MEP, French priest
- Joseph Nguyễn Ðình Nghi, Vietnamese priest
- Joseph Nguyễn Đình Uyển, catechist
- Joseph Nguyễn Duy Khang TOP, catechist
- Joseph Nguyễn Văn Lựu, layman
- Joseph Mary Díaz Sanjurjo An OP, Spanish bishop
- Joseph Melchor García-Sampedro Suárez OP, Spanish bishop
- Joseph Phạm Trọng Tả TOP, layman and governor
- Joseph Túc, layman
- Joseph Tuân OP, Vietnamese priest
- Joseph Trần Văn Tuấn, layman
- Lawrence Ngôn, layman and soldier
- Lawrence Nguyễn Văn Hưởng, Vietnamese priest
- Luke Vũ Bá Loan, Vietnamese priest
- Luke Phạm Trọng Thìn TOP, layman and governor
- Martin Tạ Đức Thịnh, Vietnamese priest
- Martin Thọ, layman
- Matthew Alonzo Leciniana Ðậu OP, Spanish priest
- Matthew Nguyễn Văn Phượng, layman
- Matthew Lê Văn Gẫm, layman and merchant
- Michael Hồ Đình Hy, layman and court mandarin
- Michael Nguyễn Huy Mỹ, layman
- Nicholas Bùi Ðức Thể, layman and soldier
- Paul Tống Viết Bường, layman and military officer
- Paul Ðổng-Dương, layman
- Paul Hạnh, layman
- Paul Phạm Khắc Khoan, Vietnamese priest
- Paul Lê Văn Lộc, Vietnamese priest
- Paul Nguyễn Văn Mỹ, catechist
- Paul Nguyễn Ngân, Vietnamese priest
- Paul Lê Bảo Tịnh, Vietnamese priest
- Peter Joseph Almató Bình OP, Spanish priest
- Peter Đinh Văn Thuần, layman
- Peter Đinh Văn Dũng, layman
- Peter Ða, layman and carpenter
- Peter Duong Văn Ðường, catechist
- Peter Francis Néron Bắc MEP, French priest
- Peter Nguyễn Văn Hiếu, catechist
- Peter Hoàng Khanh, Vietnamese priest
- Peter Võ Ðăng Khoa, Vietnamese priest
- Peter Nguyễn Văn Lựu, Vietnamese priest
- Peter Ðoàn Công Quý, Vietnamese priest
- Peter Trương Văn Thi, Vietnamese priest
- Peter Vũ Văn Truật, catechist
- Peter Nguyễn Văn Tự OP, Vietnamese priest
- Peter Nguyễn Khắc Tự, catechist
- Peter Nguyễn Bá Tuần, Vietnamese priest
- Peter Lê Tùy, Vietnamese priest
- Peter Ðoàn Văn Vân, catechist
- Philip Phan Văn Minh, Vietnamese priest
- Peter Dumoulin-Borie Cao MEP, French bishop
- Simon Phan Ðắc Hòa, layman and doctor
- Stephen Theodore Cuenot Thể MEP, French bishop
- Stephen Nguyễn Văn Vinh, layman
- Thomas Nguyễn Văn Đệ, layman
- Thomas Ðinh Viết Dụ, Vietnamese priest
- Thomas Trần Văn Thiện, seminarian
- Thomas Toán TOP, catechist
- Thomas Khuông TOP, Vietnamese priest
- Valentine Berriochoa Vinh OP, Spanish bishop
- Vincent Liêm of Peace OP, Vietnamese priest
- Vincent Dương, layman
- Vincent Nguyễn Thế Ðiểm, Vietnamese priest
- Vincent Tương, layman and local judge
- Vincent Ðỗ Yến OP, Vietnamese priest
Martyrdom of Joseph Marchand, 1835

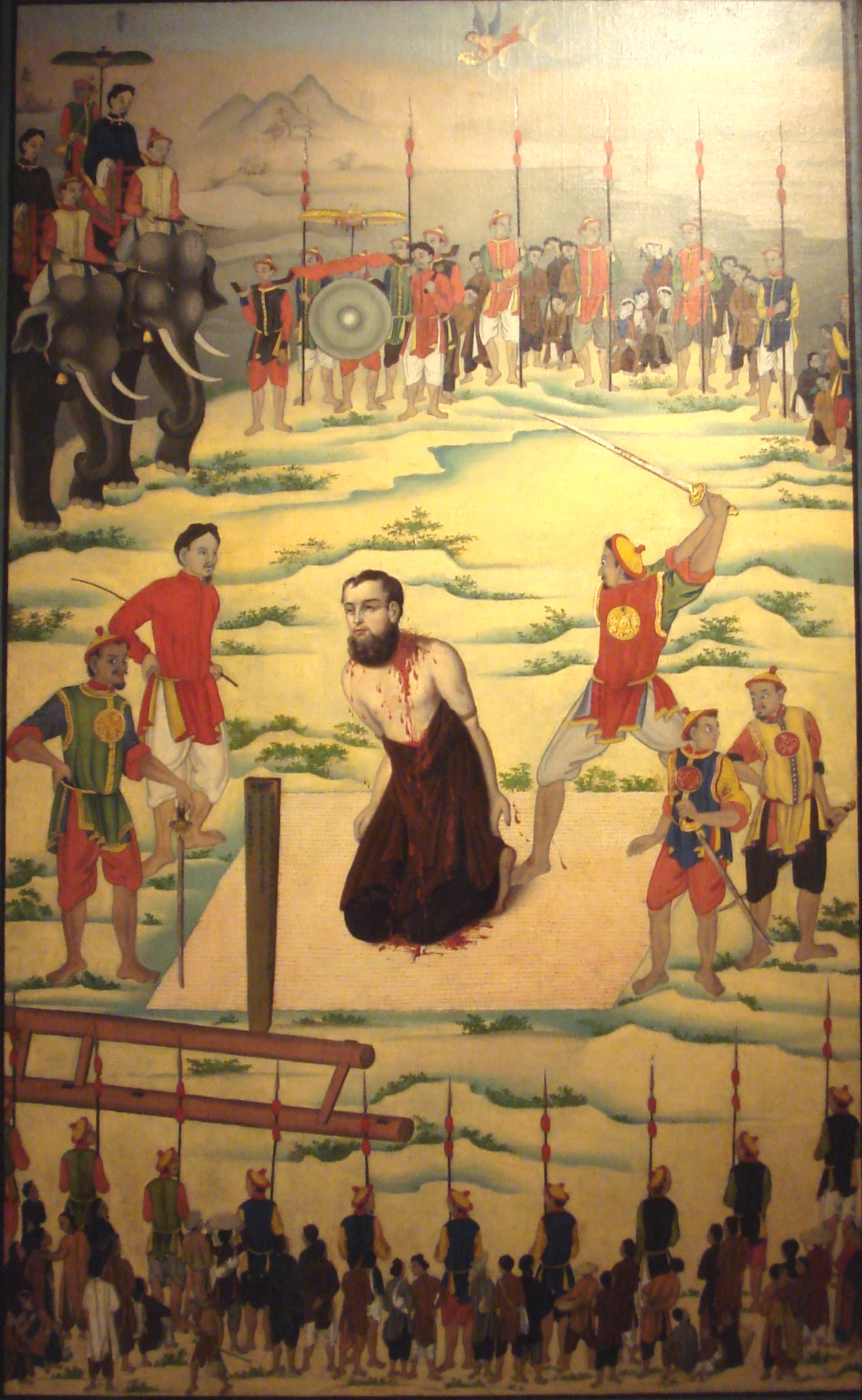
Martyrdom of Saint Pierre Borie, 24 November 1838, Tonkin, Vietnam

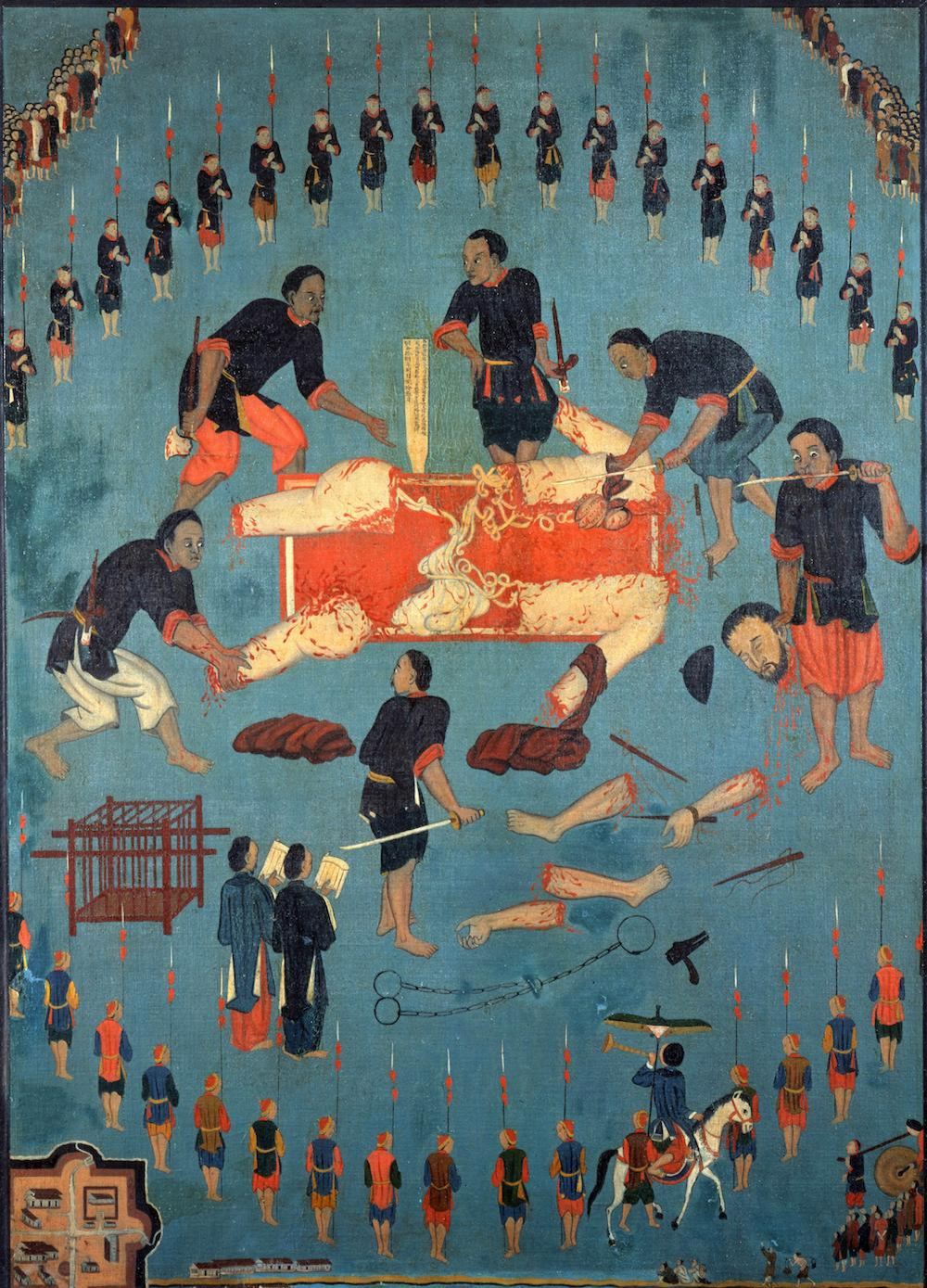
Martyrdom of Jean-Charles Cornay in 1837

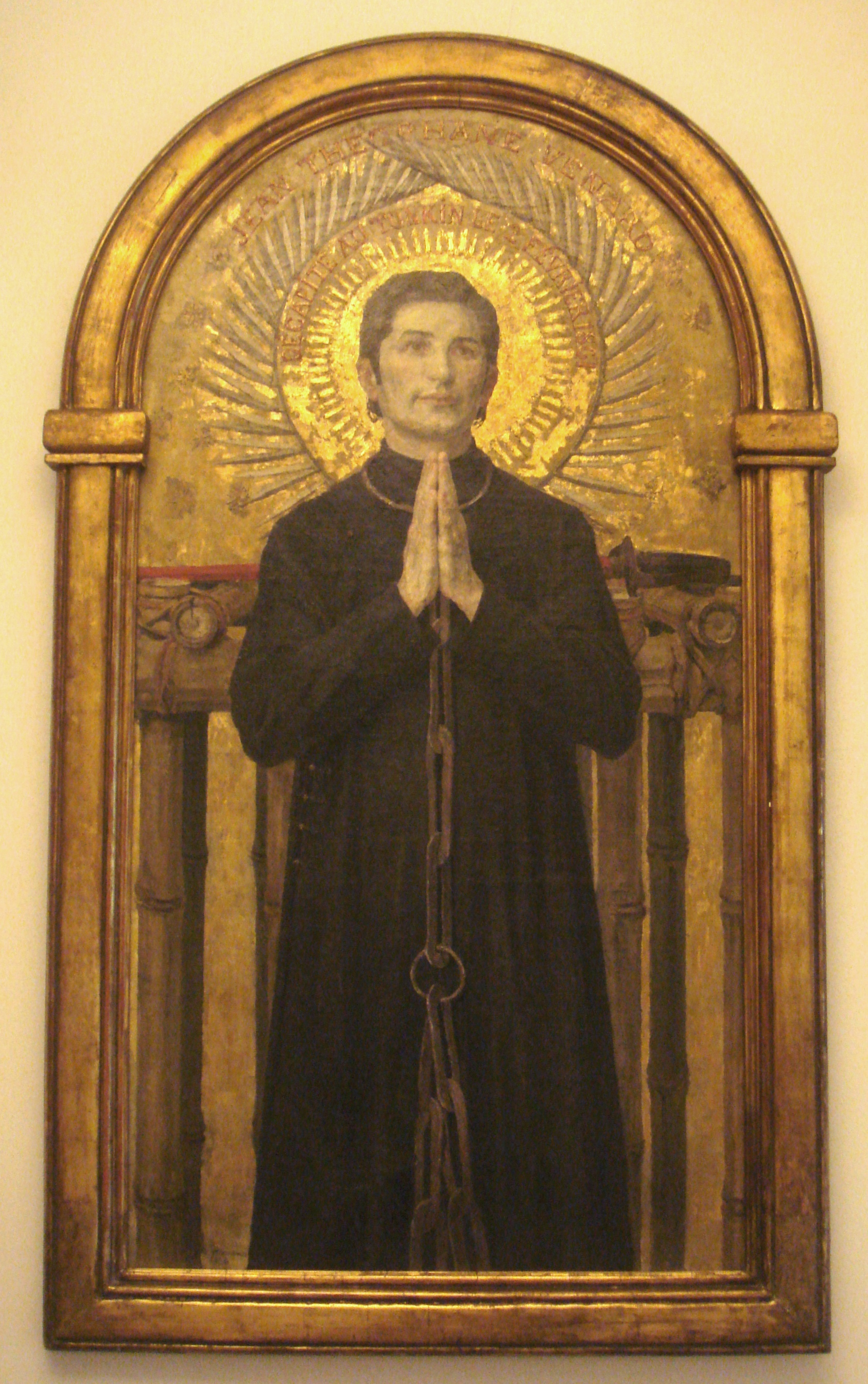
Théophane Vénard in chains, martyred in 1861

== Causes being promoted ==
- Blessed Andrew of Phú Yên, catechist
- Blessed Francis Xavier Trương Bửu Diệp, priest
- Venerable Anthony Hồ Chí Thiện, layman
- Venerable Gilles Delamotte Y MEP, French priest
- Venerable Peter Nguyễn Văn Dinh, layman
- Venerable Louis Phan Văn Ngò, layman
- Servant of God Marcel Nguyễn Tân Văn CSsR, religious brother

== Legacy ==
There are several Catholic parishes in the United States, Canada, and elsewhere dedicated to the Martyrs of Vietnam (Holy Martyrs of Vietnam Parishes), one of the largest of which is located in Arlington, Texas, in the Dallas-Fort Worth area. Others can be found in Houston and Austin, Texas, Denver, Seattle, San Antonio, Arlington, Virginia; Richmond, Virginia; and Norcross, Georgia. There are also churches named after individual saints, such as St. Philippe Minh Church in Saint Boniface, Manitoba.

== See also ==
- Catholic Church in Vietnam
- Vietnamese Martyrs, patron saint archive
- Vietnamese Catholic Lunar New Year: celebrates the Vietnamese Martyrs as part of the second day of New Year
- Nguyễn Văn Thuận, venerated Catholic prelate and cardinal
