= Bernard Vũ Văn Duệ =

Vietnamese priest

Saint Bernard Vu Van Due

Martyr
- Born: 1755; Vietnam
- Died: 1 August 1838 (aged 82–83); Vietnam
- Venerated in: Roman Catholic Church
- Canonized: 19 June 1988, Vatican City by Pope John Paul II
- Feast: 1 August

Bernard Vu Van Due, (Vietnamese: Thánh Bênađô Vũ Văn Duệ) (1755 – 1 August 1838) was a Vietnamese convert to Catholicism. He became a priest and worked as a missionary in the country for several decades. He was arrested and beheaded in 1838, at the age of 82 or 83, for being a Roman Catholic priest in Tonkin. He was later canonised as one of the Martyrs of Vietnam.

In an allocution lauding the missionaries and local converts who were killed in Tonkin for professing the Catholic faith, Pope Gregory XVI refers to his death, noting that although, according to the Tonkin laws at the time, he could not be punished by death because he was over eighty years of age, "an exception was nevertheless made in his case".
