= Pierre Dumoulin-Borie =

French Roman Catholic saint

Saint Pierre Dumoulin-Borie MEP
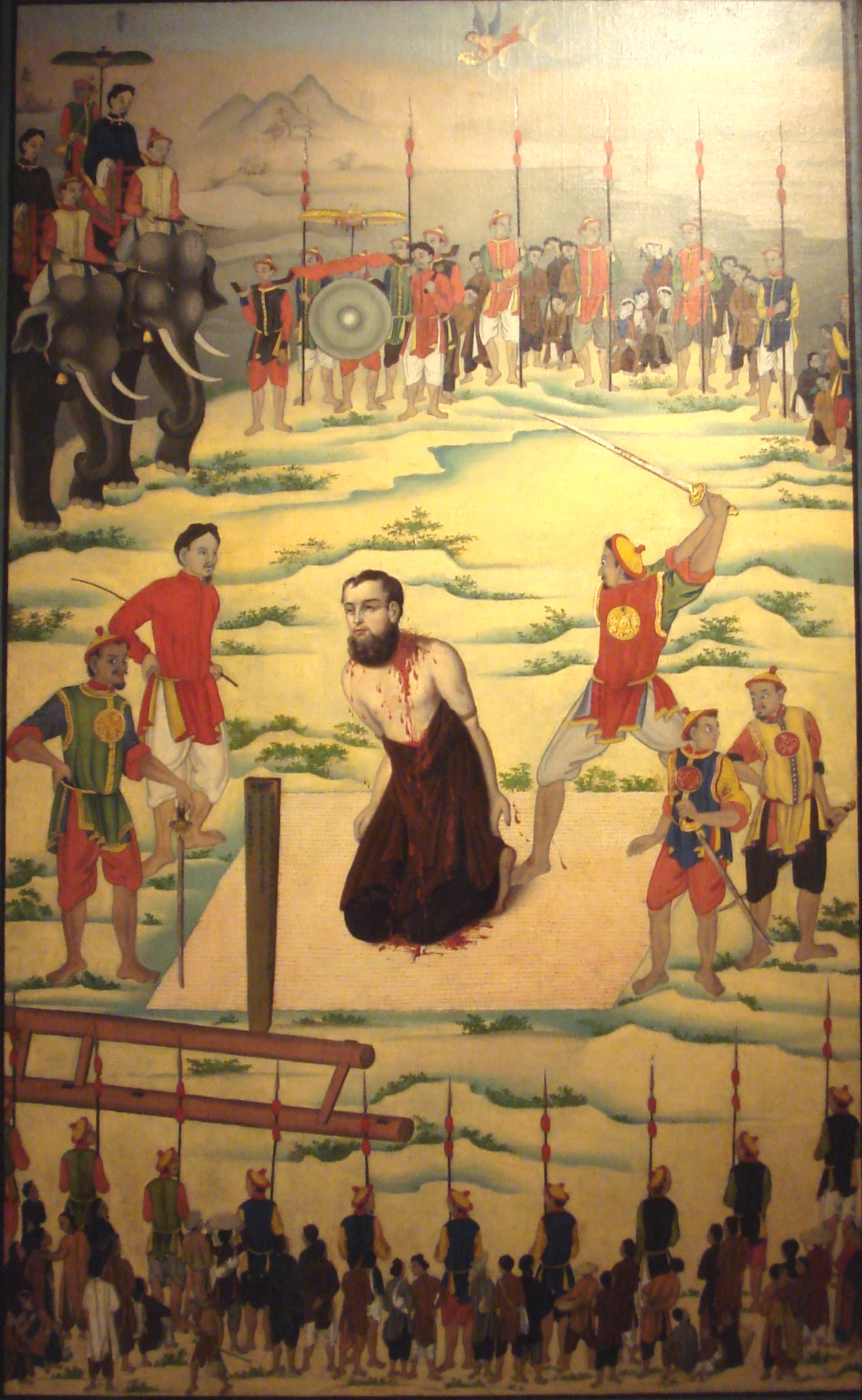
- Beheading of Saint Pierre Borie on 24 November 1838, Tonkin, Vietnam

Martyr
- Born: 20 February 1808
- Died: 24 November 1838 (aged 30)
- Beatified: 27 May 1900 by Leo XIII
- Canonized: 19 June 1988 by John-Paul II
- Feast: November 24

Pierre-Rose-Ursule Dumoulin-Borie (20 February 1808 – 24 November 1838) was a French Catholic missionary priest and a member of the Paris Foreign Missions Society. He is a Catholic saint, canonized in 1988 along with other Vietnamese Martyrs.

== Life ==
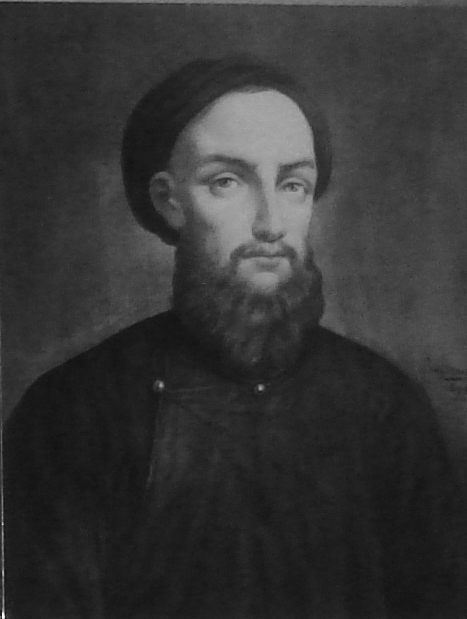
Pierre Borie (1808-1838).

Pierre Borie was the sixth of the twelve children of Guillaume Borie and his wife Rose Labrunie. The Borie family was a middle-class family of Beynat in Bas-Limousin. Family members had different backgrounds. Pierre Dumoulin-Borie had as a godfather his uncle Pierre Borie, a priest refractory during the Revolution, and then curé of Sionac; but an uncle, Jean Borie, was an administrator of Corrèze, deputy in the Legislative Parliament and Convention, and one of those who voted for the death of Louis XVI.

Pierre's godfather undertook the first rudiments of his education before he left for the Seminary of Servières in 1824. He was ordained a priest in Bayeux on 21 November 1830, Pierre was sent overseas, reaching Macao on 18 July 1831.

He was brought to Saigon by Chinese smugglers, evading the ban on proselytizing (to convert people to a religion). He joined the South Tonkin mission, but was met with persecution. He persevered in fulfilling his pastoral task in the area which was entrusted to him. Pierre was arrested in 1838, and he learned in prison that he had been named titular bishop of Acanthus on 30 January 1836. Shortly after this, on 24 November 1838, he was given a death sentence, which was carried out that day.

Exhumed secretly eleven months later, the body of Saint Pierre rests today in The Martyr's Room, at the Paris Foreign Missions Society in Paris.

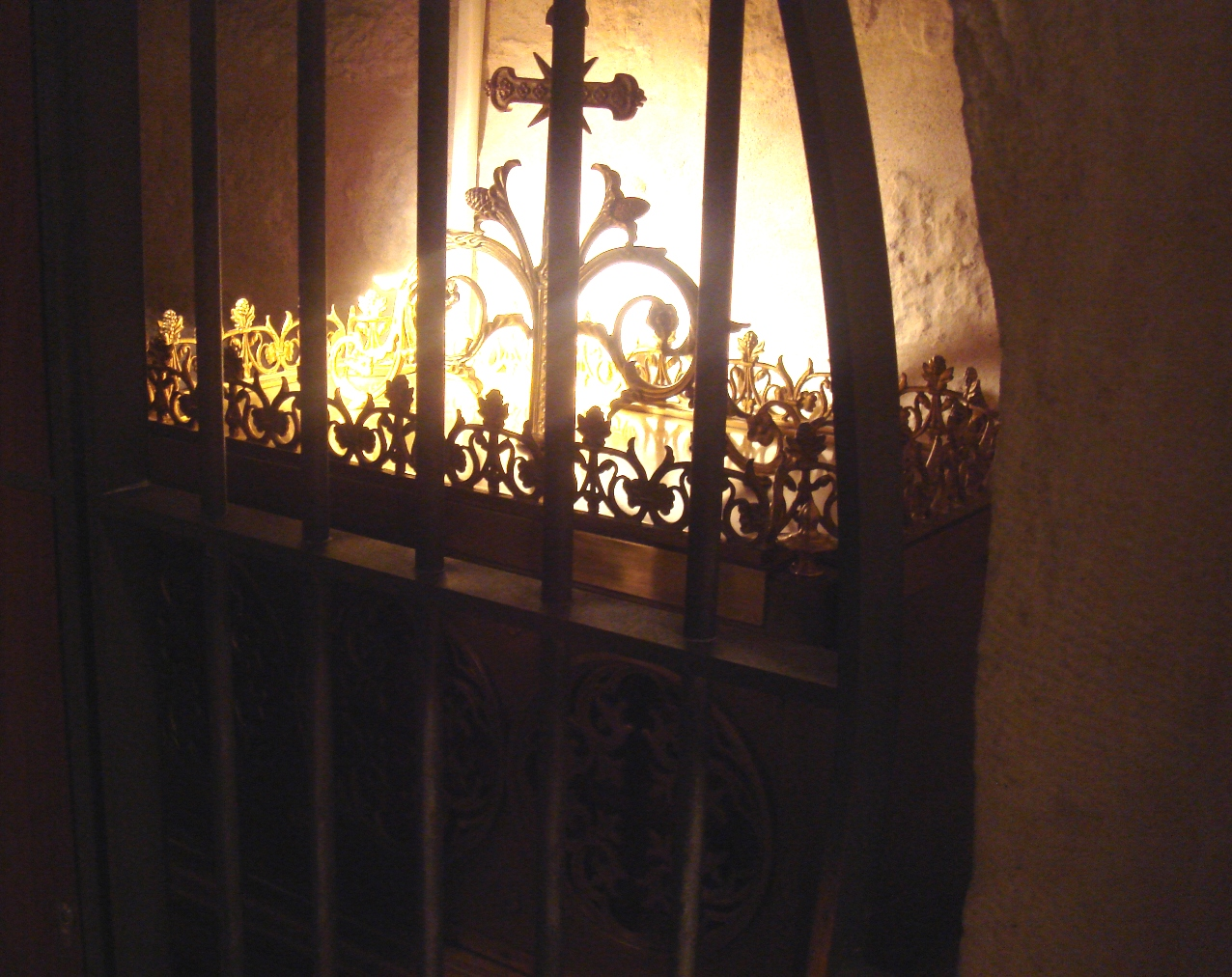
Remains of Pierre Borie, at the Paris Foreign Missions Society.

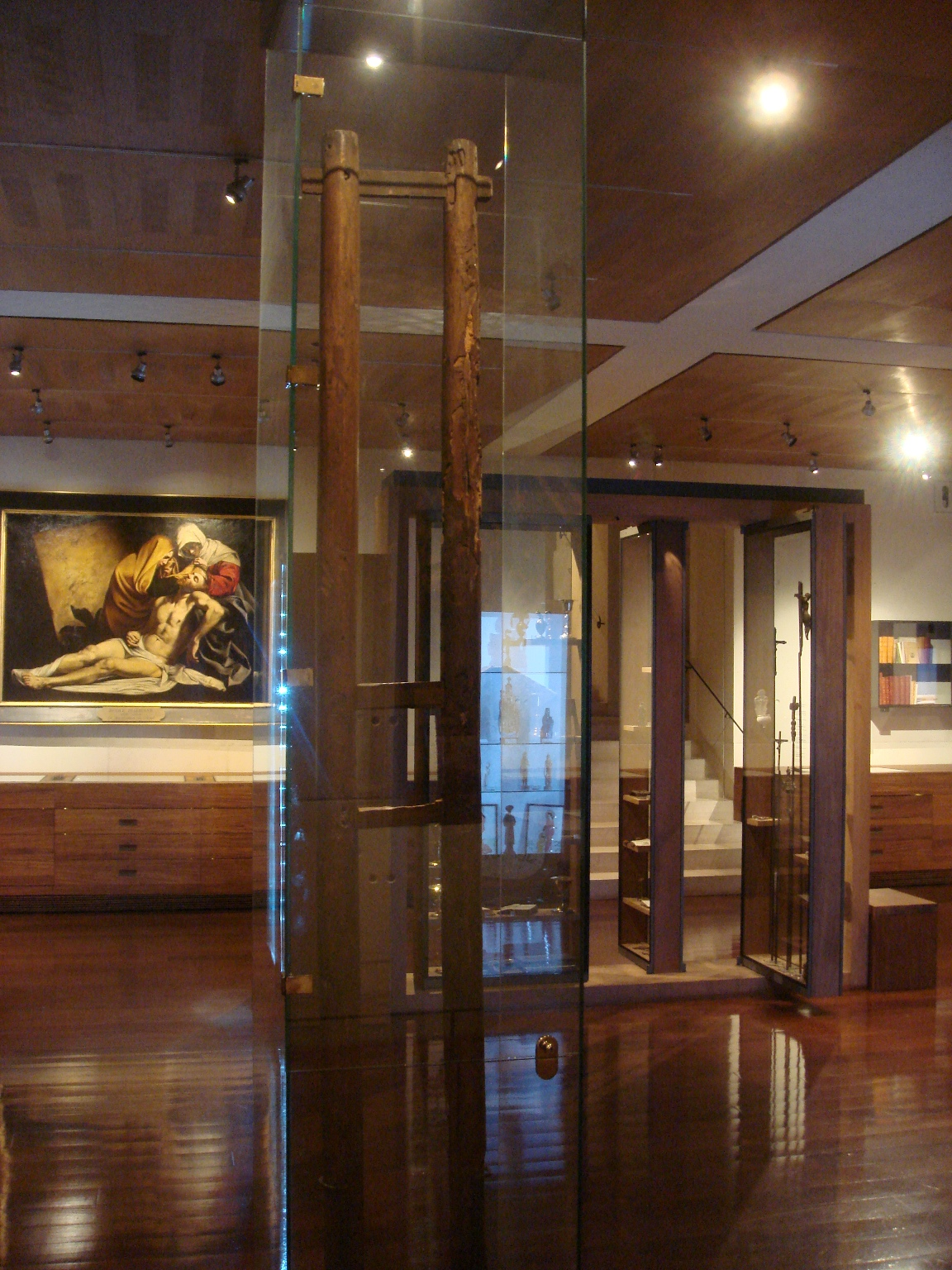
Salle des Martyrs at the Paris Foreign Missions Society. The ladder-like apparatus in the middle is the cangue that was worn by Pierre Borie in captivity.
