= John the Divine (disambiguation) =

John the Divine (John of Patmos) is the traditional author of the Book of Revelation.

John the Divine or Saint/St. John the Divine refers to the man whom Christian tradition variously calls:

- John the Apostle (died 100), disciple of Jesus
- John the Evangelist (15–?), name traditionally given to the author of the Gospel of John

== Churches and schools ==
- St. John the Divine Episcopal Church (Moorhead, Minnesota)
- Cathedral of St. John the Divine, New York
- The Cathedral School of St. John the Divine (New York City)
- Church of St John the Divine, Brooklands, Manchester, England
- Church of St John the Divine, Bulwell, Nottinghamshire, England
- St John the Divine, Horninglow, Staffordshire, England
- St John the Divine, Kennington, London, England

== See also ==
- Community of St. John the Divine, Anglican religious order based in Birmingham, England
- Sisterhood of St. John the Divine, Anglican religious order based in Canada
- Authorship of the Johannine works
- Saint John (disambiguation) for other saints called John
