= Sveti Ivan =

Sveti Ivan may refer to:

- Sveti Ivan Rilski or Saint John of Rila (876–c. 946), Bulgarian hermit
- Sveti Ivan Žabno, a municipality in Koprivnica-Križevci County, Croatia
- Sveti Ivan Zelina, a town in Zagreb county, Croatia
- Sveti Ivan, Buzet, a village near Buzet, Istria County, Croatia
- Sveti Ivan, Višnjan, a village near Višnjan, Istria County, Croatia
- Sveti Ivan, Krk, a village near Malinska, Primorje-Gorski Kotar, Croatia

== See also ==
- Saint John (disambiguation)
