= Agios Ioannis =

Agios Ioannis (Greek: Άγιος Ιωάννης for Saint John) may refer to the following places or churches

== Cyprus ==
- Agios Ioannis (Pyrgos), a village near Kato Pyrgos
- Agios Ioannis Malountas, a village near Malounta
- Agios Ioannis (Limassol), a district of Limassol municipality
- Agios Ioannis, Limassol, a village in Limassol District
- Agios Ioannis, Paphos, a village in Paphos District
- Agios Ioannis (church in Larnaca), a church in the neighborhood of Prodromos, Larnaca

== Greece ==
- Agios Ioannis, older name of Syrna (island), an island in the Aegean Sea
- Agios Ioannis, Argolis, a village in Argolis
- Agios Ioannis, Chania, a village in the municipality Sfakia, Chania regional unit
- Agios Ioannis, Corfu, a village in the municipal unit Parelioi, Corfu
- Agios Ioannis, Elis, a village in the municipality Pyrgos, Elis
- Agios Ioannis, Ithaca, a village on the Strait of Ithaca
- Agios Ioannis, Kavala, a settlement in the city of Kavala, Kavala regional unit
- Agios Ioannis, Evrotas, a village in the municipality Evrotas, Laconia
- Agios Ioannis, Monemvasia, a village in the municipality Monemvasia, Laconia
- Agios Ioannis, Sparti, a village in the municipality Sparti, Laconia
- Agios Ioannis, Lasithi, a village in Lasithi, Crete
- Agios Ioannis, Magnesia, a village in the municipal unit Sourpi, Magnesia
- Agios Ioannis, Pelion, a village and beach resort in Pelion, Magnesia
- Agios Ioannis Rentis, a suburb of Athens
- Agios Ioannis, Mykonos, a beach resort on the island of Mykonos
