= Théophane Vénard =

French Catholic missionary (1829–1861)

Saint Théophane Vénard MEP
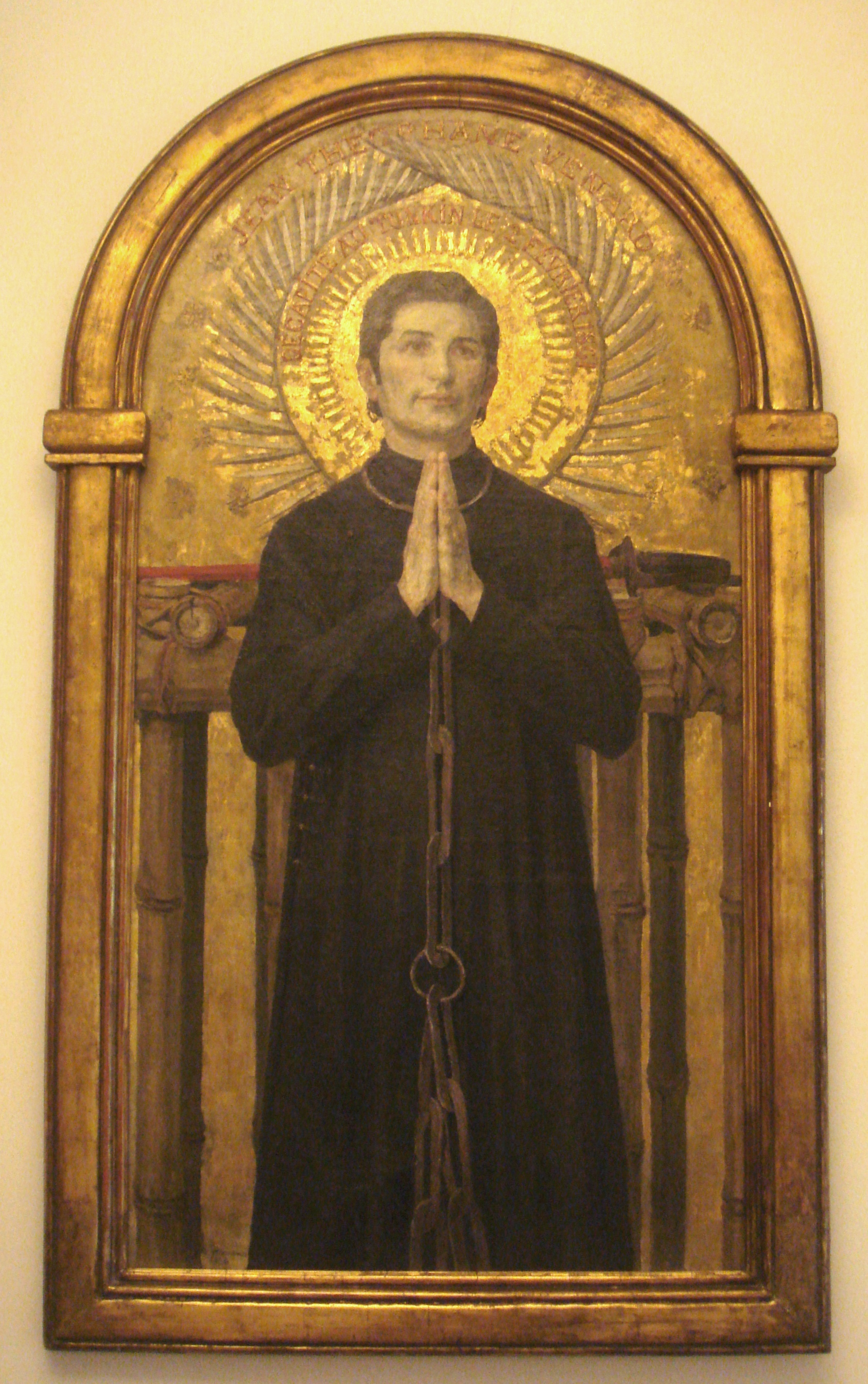
- Painting of Théophane Vénard in chains, at the Paris Foreign Missions Society

Martyr
- Born: 21 November 1829; Saint-Loup-sur-Thouet, Diocese of Poitiers, France
- Died: 2 February 1861 (aged 31); Tonkin, Vietnam
- Venerated in: Roman Catholic Church
- Beatified: 2 May 1909, Rome, Kingdom of Italy by Pope Pius X
- Canonized: 19 June 1988, Vatican City, Rome, Italy by John-Paul II
- Feast: 24 November

Jean-Théophane Vénard (21 November 1829 at Saint-Loup-sur-Thouet, Diocese of Poitiers, France – 2 February 1861 in Tonkin, Vietnam) was a French Catholic missionary to Indo-China. He was a member of the Paris Foreign Missions Society. He was beatified in company with thirty-three other Catholic martyrs, most of whom were natives of Tonkin, Cochin-China, or China. Pope John Paul II canonized him, with nineteen other martyrs, in 1988.

== Life ==
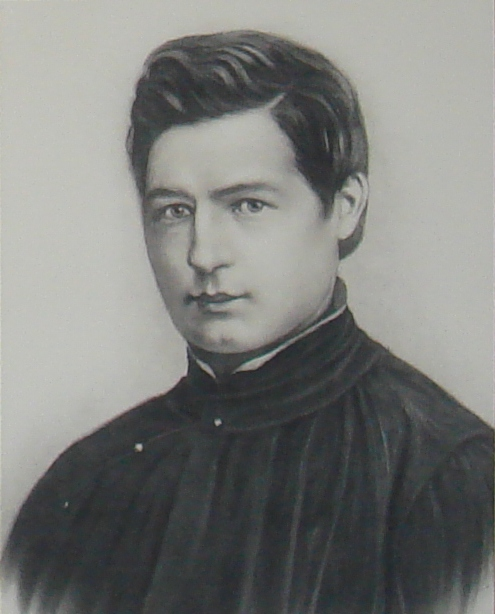
Théophane Vénard

Vénard was one of six children born to the local schoolmaster and his wife. One of Theophane's brothers, Eusebins, later became cure of the parish of Assai, a small village not far from Saint Loup. His sister Melanie entered a religious community at Amiens. As a young boy, he read of the martyrdom of Jean-Charles Cornay and was inspired to become a missionary.

Having learned the basics of Latin from the local parish priest, in 1841 Vénard commenced studies at the college of Doué-la-Fontaine. At the age of eighteen he began philosophical studies at the seminary in Montmorillon, followed by theological studies at the major seminary in Poitiers. He entered the Paris Seminary for Foreign Missions as a sub-deacon and was ordained a priest on 5 June 1852.

He left Paris for the Far East on 19 September, embarking from Antwerp. The vessel was driven by a heavy gale into Plymouth, England, and after some delay sailed October 10 for the East, arriving at Singapore on New Year's Day, 1853. After spending three weeks here, Venard was sent to Hong-Kong, where he remained fifteen months studying the Chinese language. A change in plans resulted in his being sent to assist Bishop Pierre-André Retord, at his mission in West Tonkin (northern Vietnam). Shortly after Vénard's arrival a new royal edict was issued against Christians, and bishops and priests were obliged to seek refuge in caves, dense woods, and elsewhere.

Vénard headed for the mountains, where he continued to exercise his ministry, mostly at night. On 30 November 1860, he was captured and sent to the city of Phủ Lý. From there he was taken to the prefecture in Hanoi. Tried before a mandarin, he refused to apostatize and step on a crucifix. He was sentenced to be beheaded. Vénard remained a captive until 2 February, and during this interval lived in a cage, from which he wrote to his family beautiful and consoling letters, joyful in anticipation of his crown. Towards evening, he was sometimes allowed to go outside to hear confessions from the priests in the prison or to walk around reciting the rosary and singing hymns of thanksgiving, to the amazement of the guards.

Jean-Théophane Vénard was beheaded 2 February 1861. On the way to martyrdom Vénard chanted psalms and hymns. To his executioner, who coveted his clothing and asked what he would give to be killed promptly, he answered: "The longer it lasts the better it will be". His head, after exposure at the top of a pole, was secured by the Christians and is now venerated in Tonkin. The body rests in the crypt at the motherhouse of the Paris Foreign Mission Society in Paris, France.

== Veneration ==
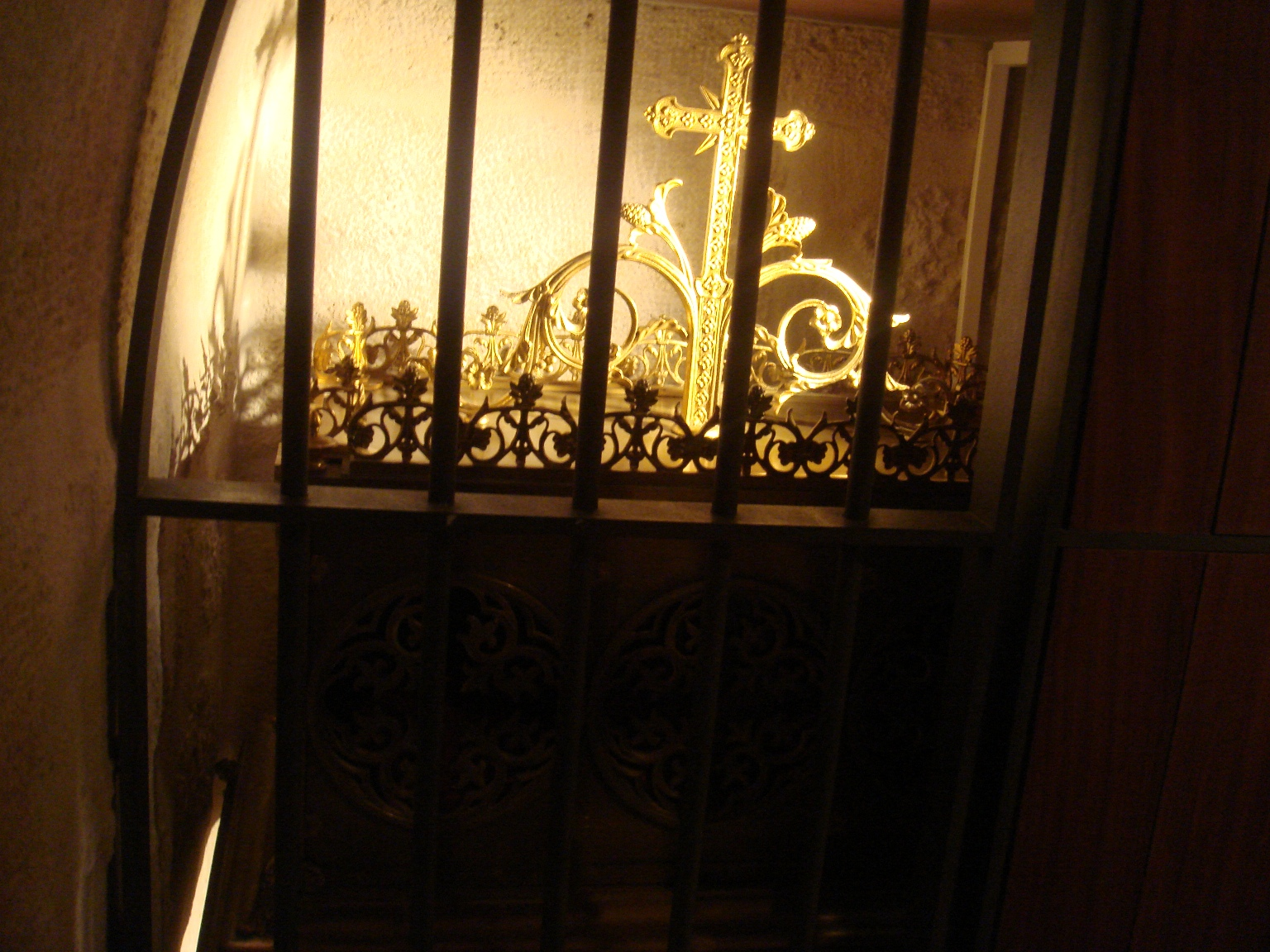
Remains of Théophane Vénard at the Paris Foreign Missions Society

The cause of his beatification was introduced at Rome in 1879, and he was declared Blessed, 2 May 1909. He was canonized on 19 June 1988, by Pope John Paul II.

Roman Martyrology: "In Hanoi, Tonkin, now Viet Nam, Saint Jean-Theophane Vénard, priest of the Paris Society for Foreign Missions and martyr, who, after six years of clandestine ministry marked by hardship and suffering, locked in a cage and condemned to death under Emperor Tự Đức, went peacefully to his martyrdom."

== Sources ==
- Walsh, James A., Thoughts from Modern Martyrs
- F. Trochu, Le Bienheureux Théophane Vénard. Ouvrage couronné par l' Académie française. Lyon, Paris, Édit. E. Vitte, [1929].
