= St. Johns Township =

St. Johns Township may refer to the following places in the United States:

- St. Johns Township, Kandiyohi County, Minnesota
- St. Johns Township, Franklin County, Missouri
- St. Johns Township, Harrison County, Iowa, in Iowa
- St. Johns Township, Hertford County, North Carolina, in North Carolina

== See also ==
- St. John Township (disambiguation)
