= François-Isidore Gagelin =

French Roman Catholic saint

Saint François-Isidore Gagelin
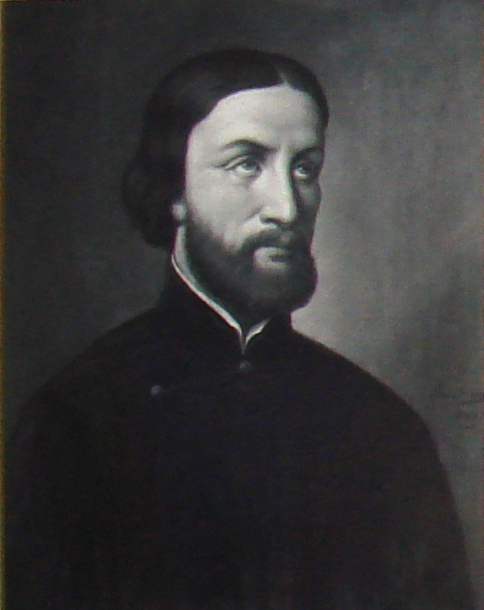
- François-Isidore Gagelin (1799-1833).

Martyr
- Born: 1799
- Died: 1833
- Canonized: 19 June 1988 by John-Paul II

François-Isidore Gagelin (10 May 1799 – 17 October 1833) was a French missionary of the Paris Foreign Missions Society in Vietnam. He died a martyr, and became the first French martyr of the 19th century in Vietnam. He was born in Montperreux, Doubs. He left for Vietnam in 1821. In 1826, when Emperor Minh Mạng ordered all missionaries to gather at the capital Huế, he fled to the south to Đồng Nai in Cochinchina. He was captured once and released.

On 6 January 1833, a new edict of prohibition was promulgated by Minh Mạng and immediately put in application. Churches were destroyed, and missionaries had to live in hiding. Gagelin surrendered in August 1833, and he was brought to Huế. He was killed by strangulation on 17 October 1833, which is the date of his feast.

He was beatified in 1900, and canonized in 1988 by Pope John Paul II.
