= St. John Township =

St. John Township may refer to the following places in the United States:

- St. John Township, Lake County, Indiana, in Lake County
- St. John Township, Stafford County, Kansas, in Kansas
- St. John Township, New Madrid County, Missouri, in Missouri

== See also ==
- St. Johns Township (disambiguation)
