= Old St. John's Cemetery =

Cemetery in Tartu, Estonia

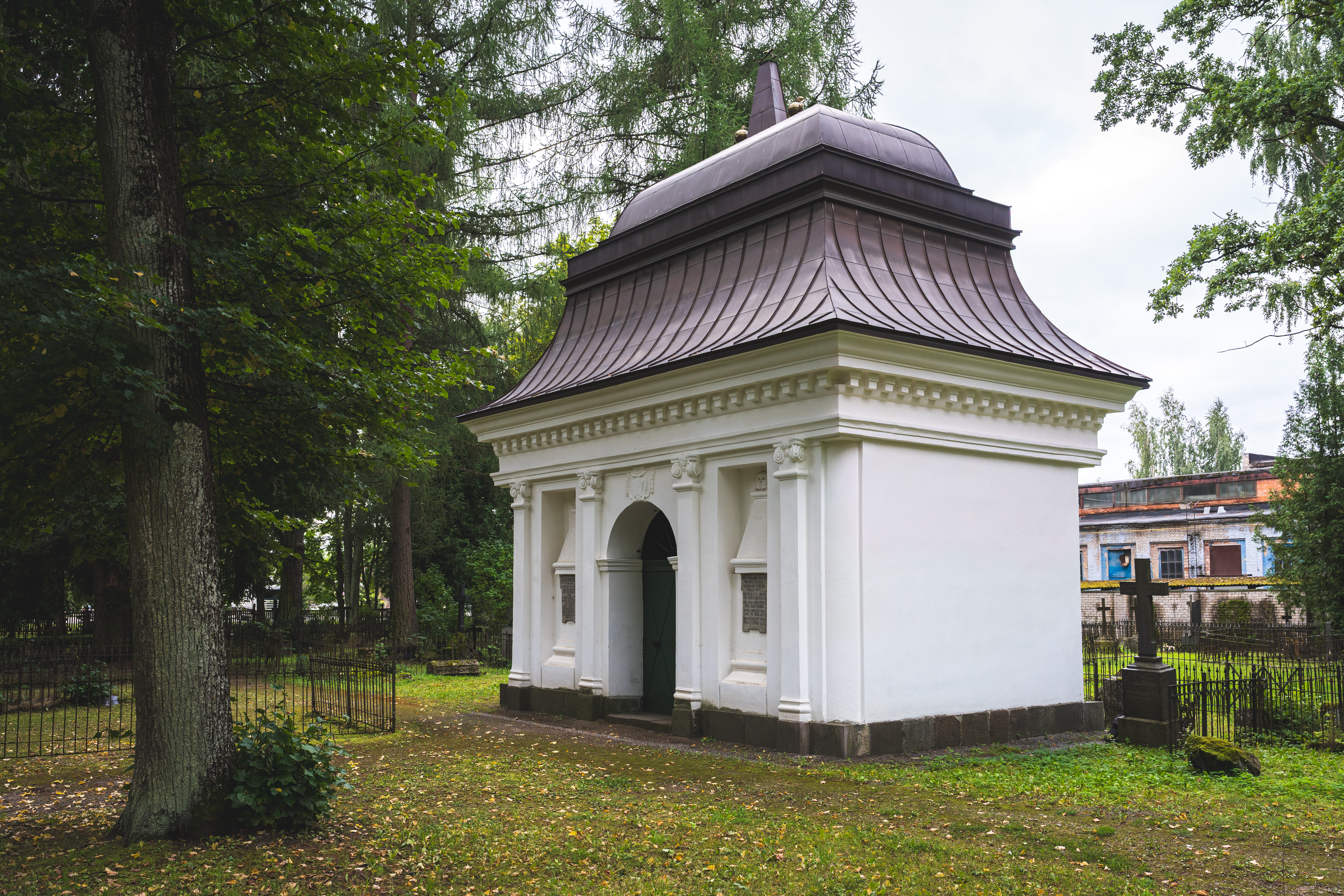
- Teller Chapel in Tartu Vana-Jaani Cemetery
- Interactive map of Old St. John's Cemetery

Details
- Established: 1773
- Location: Tartu
- Country: Estonia
- Coordinates: 58°23′36″N 26°43′41″E

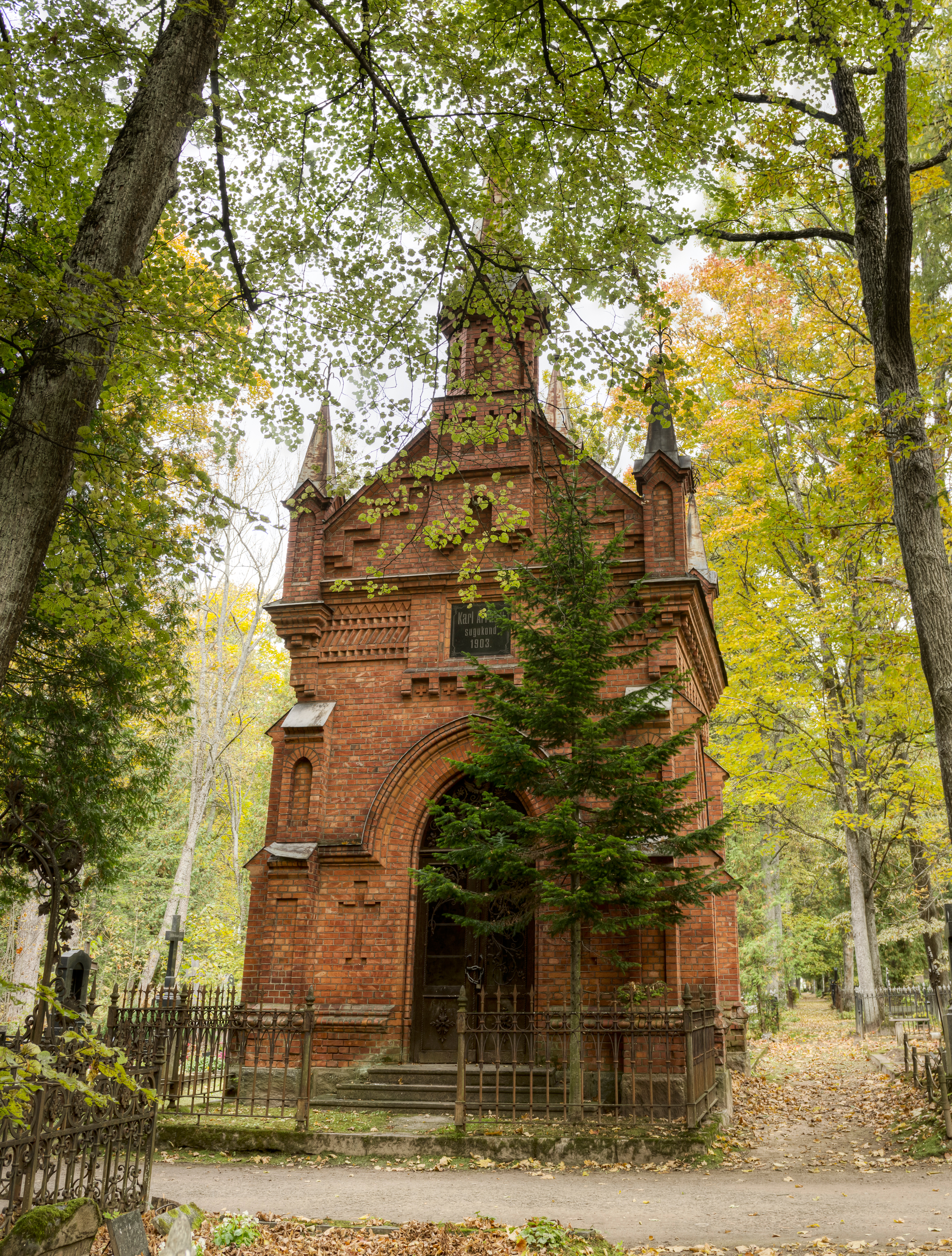
Arrak chapel in Vana-Jaani cemetery

Old St. John's Cemetery (Estonian: Vana-Jaani kalmistu) lies in the southeastern part of Raadi Cemetery in Tartu, Estonia. It was entered into the National Register of Cultural Monuments on 23 May 1997.

Following a ukase of Russian Empress Catherine II forbidding burials in churches, Old St. John's Cemetery was founded in 1773 under the ownership of St. John's Church, and formally opened on 5 November that year. It served as the burial location for St. John's German and Estonian congregations and the Tartu Russian church. However, its name dates to the foundation of New St. John's Cemetery on Puiestee Street.

There are several buildings of historical value in the cemetery: the family chapel of Mayor Jacob Friedrich Teller, the Rauch-Seidlitz chapel, and the Carl Klein chapel.

== Notable burials ==
- Aleksander Adojaan
- Villem Alttoa
- Betti Alver (1906–1999), Estonian poet
- Endel Ani
- Ülo Arend
- Paul Ariste (1905–1990), Estonian linguist
- Lauri Aus (1970–2003), Estonian professional cyclist
- Karl Ernst von Baer (1792–1876), Baltic German scientist and explorer
- Valeri Bezzubov
- Rem Blum
- Erdmann Gustav von Broecker
- Wilhelm Gottfried Eisenschmidt
- Henn Elmet
- Villem Ernits
- Johann Philipp Gustav Ewers (1779–1830), German legal historian and the founder of Russian legal history
- Friedrich Robert Faehlmann (1778–1850), Estonian writer, medical doctor and philologist
- Harald Haberman
- August Matthias Hagen (1794–1878), Baltic German painter and graphic artis
- Julie Wilhelmine Hagen-Schwarz (1824–1902), Baltic German painter
- Traugott Hahn
- Samuel Gottlieb Rudolf Henzi (1794–1828), Swiss linguist, professor at the University of Tartu (stone removed by the Soviets)
- Kaarel Ird
- Aino Järvesoo
- Epp Kaidu
- Ants Kallikorm
- Gunnar Kangro
- Paul Kard
- Elmar Karu
- Arnold Kask
- Paul Kenkmann
- Aksel Kipper
- Johann Wilhelm Krause
- Friedrich Reinhold Kreutzwald
- Fred Kudu
- Olevi Kull
- Eerik Kumari
- Grigori Kuzmin
- Kuno Kõrge
- Bernhard Eduard Otto Körber
- Valter Külvet
- Roland Laasmäe
- Leo Leesment
- Mart Lepik
- Artur Lind
- Juri Lotman
- Johannes Lükki
- Jaan Maramaa
- Otto Wilhelm Masing
- Uku Masing
- Johann Karl Simon Morgenstern
- Oleg Mutt (1920–1986), linguist and translator
- Pent Nurmekund
- Salme Nõmmik
- Uno Palm
- Harald Peep
- Urmas Petti
- Rudolf Põldmäe
- Leo Päi
- Valter Pärtelpoeg
- Richard Ritsing
- Karl August Senff
- Rudolf Säre
- Kulno Süvalep
- Evald Tordik
- Gustav Teichmüller
