= Agios Ioannis, Limassol =

Agios Ioannis Άγιος Ιωάννης
- Village
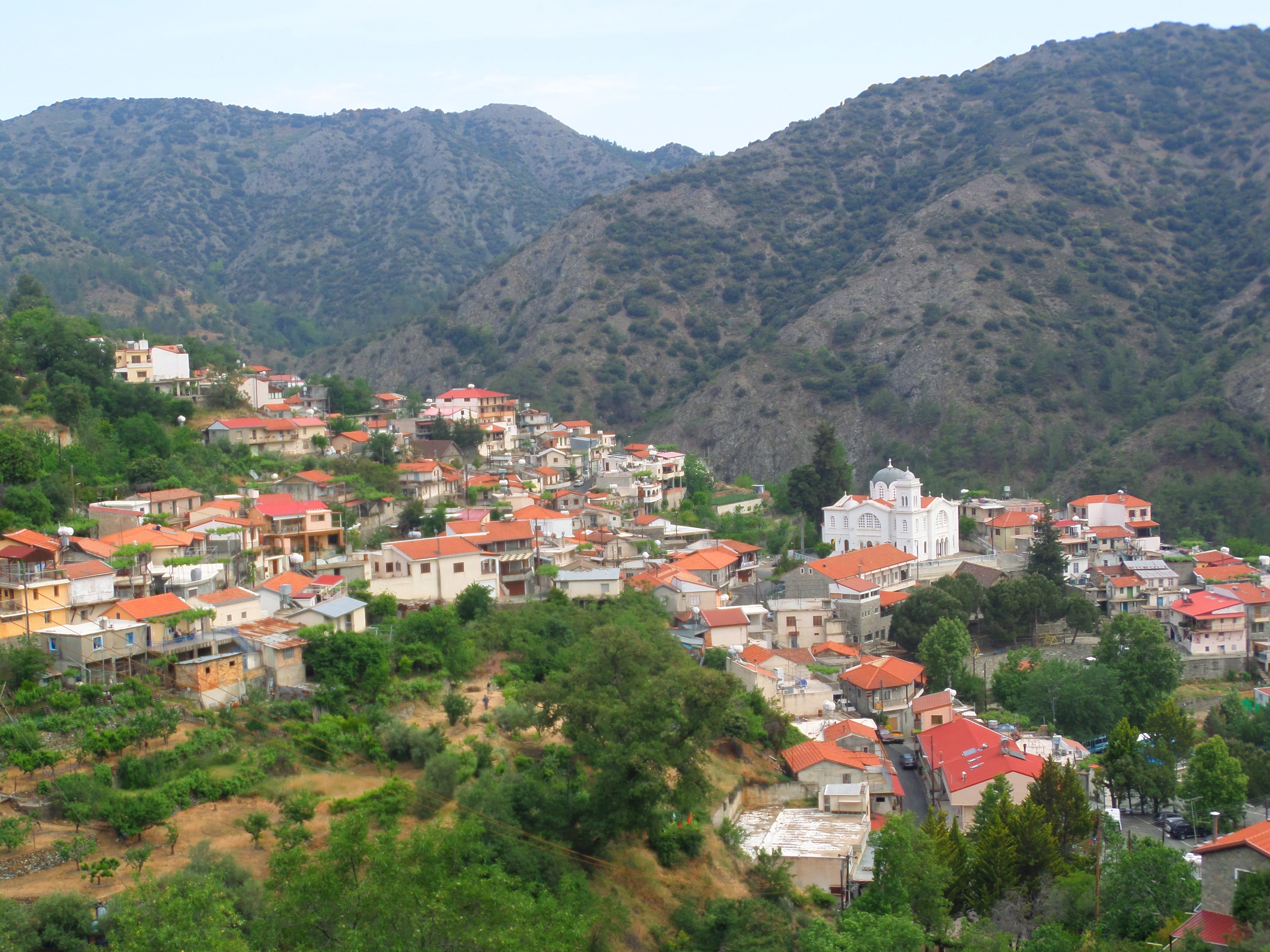

- Location in Cyprus
- Coordinates: 34°53′44″N 33°1′14″E
- Country: Cyprus
- District: Limassol District

Population (2001)
  - Total: 396
- Time zone: UTC+2 (EET)
  - Summer (DST): UTC+3 (EEST)

Agios Ioannis (Greek: Άγιος Ιωάννης) is a village in the Limassol District of Cyprus, located around 30 km north of Limassol.
