= New St. John's Cemetery =

Cemetery in Tartu, Estonia

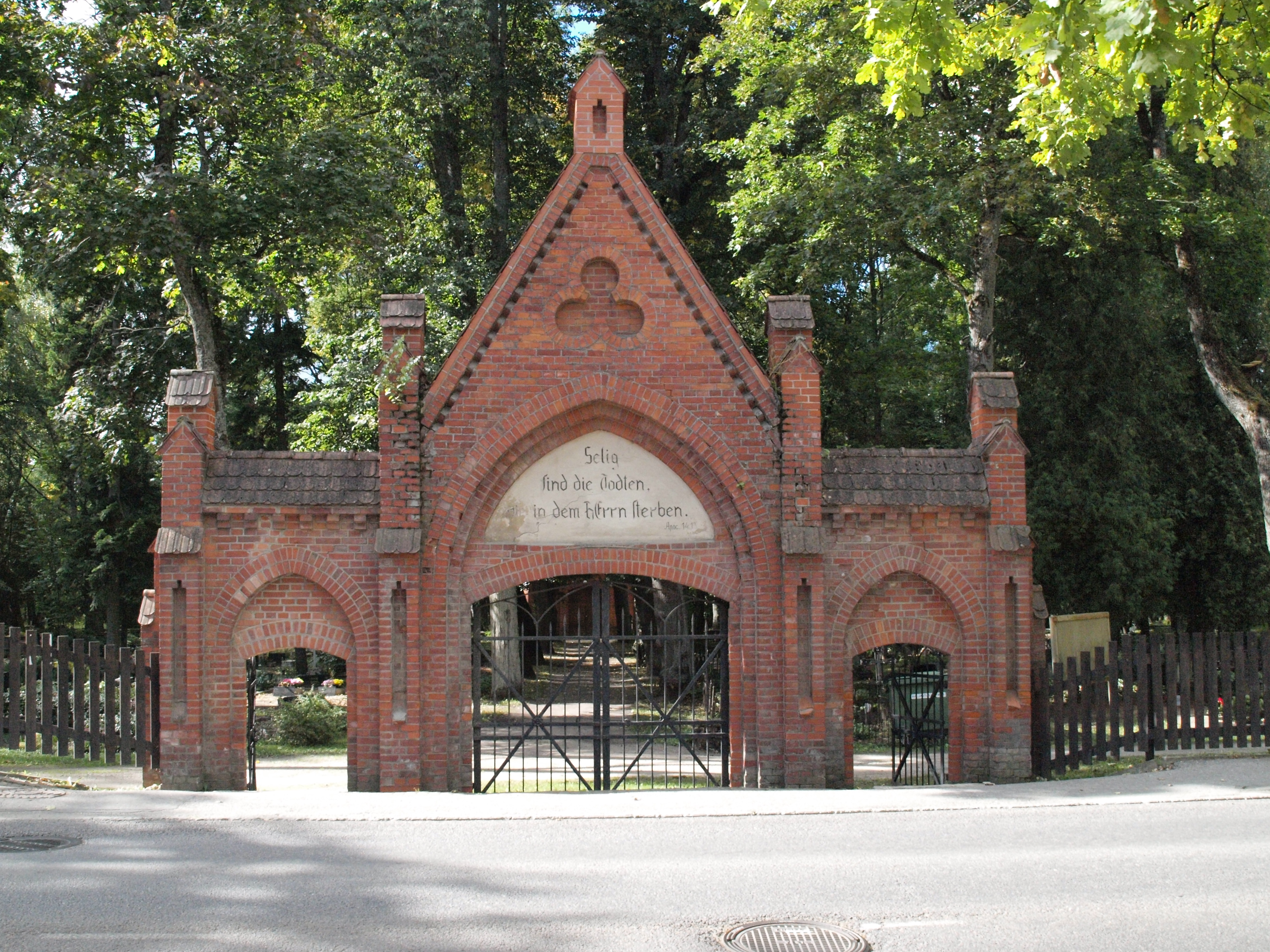
- Cemetery's entrance gate
- Interactive map of New St. John's Cemetery

Details
- Established: 1890
- Location: Tartu
- Country: Estonia
- Coordinates: 58°23′42″N 26°42′47″E
- Find a Grave: New St. John's Cemetery

New St. John's Cemetery (Estonian: Uus-Jaani kalmistu) is a cemetery in Tartu, Estonia. Next to this cemetery is located Old St. John's Cemetery.

The cemetery was opened in April 1890.

== Burials ==
- August Rauber
- Edmund August Friedrich Russow
- Carl Ernst Heinrich Schmidt
- Hugo Treffner
- Mihkel Veske
