= Andrew of Phú Yên =

Vietnamese catechist and martyr (1625–1644)

Blessed Andrew of Phú Yên
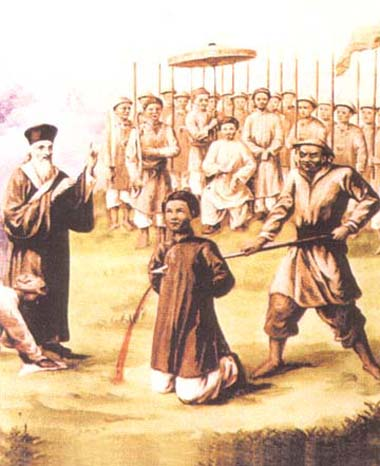
- 20th-century painting of the martyrdom of Andrew of Phú Yên

Protomartyr of Vietnam
- Born: 1625; Phú Yên province, Vietnam
- Died: 26 July 1644 (aged 19 or 20); Kẻ Chàm
- Beatified: 5 March 2000, Rome by Pope John Paul II
- Feast: 26 July
- Patronage: Catechists, Diocese of Qui Nhơn

Andrew of Phú Yên (1625 – 26 July 1644) is known as the "Protomartyr of Vietnam." Baptized in 1641, he was a dedicated assistant to Jesuit missionaries and was thus arrested in the persecution of Christians launched in 1644. After refusing to abjure the faith, he was put to death in Kẻ Chàm. Andrew was beautified by Pope John Paul II on March 5, 2000. His feast day is 26 July.

His real name remains unknown, but two details have been confirmed: his baptismal name was Andrew (Anrê), and his birth place was Phú Yên. This name was widely used in commemorative events.

Some other historical sources suggest that, as a child, he had a name typical of other rural children of the time. After being baptized in 1641, he was given the Christian name Andrew (Anrê). From then on, he no longer used his former name, and people simply referred to him by his baptismal name, Andrew.

== Biography ==
Andrew came from the province of Trấn Biên (Phú Yên), today in Vietnam. On the insistence of his mother, Jeanne, Alexandre de Rhodes, a French Jesuit missionary, agreed to include him among his students. Andrew soon surpassed his fellow pupils. Together with his mother, he received Baptism in 1641. He would have been about 15 years of age, having been born in 1625 or 1626. At the time of his death in 1644, he was 19 or 20. In 1642 Andrew become one of Alexander de Rhodes' closest co-workers and, after a year of further formation, he joined the Maison Dieu ("House of God") catechist association which de Rhodes had instituted. Its members made a public promise to spend their entire lives serving the Catholic Church by helping priests and spreading the Gospel.

Before the end of July 1644, Mandarin Ong Nghe Bo returned to the province which he governed and where Andrew was living. He had orders from the Nguyễn lord to prevent the expansion of Christianity in his kingdom. De Rhodes, unaware of the Mandarin's intentions, paid him a courtesy visit, but was quickly informed that the Nguyễn lord was angered at the great number of Cochinchina who were following the Christian faith. De Rhodes must therefore leave the country and no longer teach Christian doctrine to the Cochinchina; since the latter were the subjects of the emperor, they would incur the most severe penalties.

De Rhodes left the palace and went directly to the prison where an elderly catechist was already incarcerated. Meanwhile, the Mandarin had sent soldiers to Fr. de Rhodes' house in search of another catechist, but he had left on an apostolic mission. They found young Andrew instead. In order not to return empty-handed to Ong Nghe Bo, they beat Andrew, bound him and transferred him to the Governor's palace.

On 25 July 1644 Andrew was taken to the Mandarin, who tried in various ways to make Andrew "desist from that foolish opinion of his, and give up the faith". But he replied that he was a Christian and most ready to undergo any suffering rather than abandon the law that he professed. Indignant at Andrew's inflexibility, the Mandarin ordered that he be taken to prison. The young Andrew was so serene and joyous at being able to suffer for Christ that people who came to see him recommended themselves to his prayers. He would not hear of this, but asked them to pray that God might give him the grace to be faithful to the end and to "respond with fullness of love to the infinite love of his Lord, who gave his life for men, by giving his own life".

The next day, 26 July, Andrew was taken to the Governor's public audience, where he was sentenced to death. In the afternoon, an officer led Andrew to Kẻ Chàm. De Rhodes, many Portuguese and Vietnamese Christians, and even pagans followed the procession and witnessed the killing. Andrew exhorted the Christians to remain firm in their faith, not to be saddened by his death, and to help him with their prayers to be faithful to the end. He was executed with some blows of a lance and, finally, when he was about to be beheaded with a scimitar, he cried out the name of Jesus loudly.

== Beatification ==
Andrew was beatified by Pope John Paul II on 5 March 2000. In Andrew’s beatification homily, Pope John Paul II preached "The words he repeated as he advanced on the path of martyrdom are the expression of what motivated his whole life: ‘Let us return love for love to our God, let us return life for life.’"

26 July, the date of his martyrdom, is Andrew of Phú Yên's feast day.

== Places of Veneration ==
=== Churches named after Andrew Phú Yên ===
- Mằng Lăng Church (Nhà thờ Mằng Lăng), Tuy An District, Phú Yên Province, Vietnam: His birthplace parish; built 1892–1907 in Gothic style, a major pilgrimage site with memorials to him. Many documents and artifacts related to him are housed here.
- Blessed Andrew Phu-Yen Parish of St. Clement Church in Medford
- LTT Retreat Center: contains a prayer garden dedicated to the saint
