= Dryad (disambiguation) =

A dryad is a form of mythological Greek nymph associated with trees.

Dryad or dryade may also refer to:

== Military ==
- HMS Dryad, any one of several ships of the Royal Navy
- Dryad-class torpedo gunboat, in the Royal Navy
- Operation Dryad, a British Second World War commando raid
- DRYAD, a cryptographic system used by the United States military
- Dryade-class frigate, class of ship in the French Navy
- French frigate Dryade (1783), Hébé-class ship of the French Navy

== Entertainment ==
- Dryad (comics), a Marvel Comics character
- Dryad (Dungeons & Dragons), game character
- Dryad, a character in the Quest for Glory game series

== Music ==
- Dryad, role in the opera Ariadne auf Naxos by Richard Strauss
- Dryad, role in the opera Scylla et Glaucus by Jean-Marie Leclair
- Dryads, composition for voice and orchestra by John Bevan Baker
- Dryads and Pan from Myths by Karol Szymanowski

== Literature ==
- Dryad, a collection of stories by Ethel Mannin
- Dryades, a poem by William Diaper

== Places ==
- Dryad, Washington, an unincorporated town
- Dryad Lake, a lake in Montana
- Dryades Street, a street and district in Central City, New Orleans
- Dryad Point, a headland on North-East corner of Campbell Island in British Columbia

== Other ==
- Dryad (repository), a nonprofit organization and international repository of scientific and medical data
- Dryad (programming), a Microsoft programming infrastructure
- SS Savoia, later renamed Dryad, a refrigerated cargo ship
- Dryad, a painting by Evelyn De Morgan
- Dryade, a merchant ship built by William Scott Shipbuilders
- Dryad (Minois dryas), a species of butterfly
- Dryad (HBC vessel), operated by the HBC from 1825 to 1836, see Hudson's Bay Company vessels
- Dryades, a genus of flowering plants native to Brazil
- Phrynomedusa dryade, the monkey frog

== See also ==
- The Dryad (disambiguation)
- Dryas (disambiguation)
- Dryad's saddle (Polyporus squamosus), an edible basidiomycete mushroom
