= French frigate Dryade =

French frigate Dryade includes the following ships:

- French frigate Dryade (1702), captured by the Royal Navy in 1709
- French frigate Dryade (1783), a Hébé-class frigate
- French frigate Dryade (1812), later named Fleur de Lys and Résolue, wrecked in 1833
- French frigate Dryade (1828), lead Dryade-class frigate, also named Caroline
- French frigate Dryade (1856)

== See also ==
- Dryad (disambiguation)
