= French frigate Didon =

Four frigates of the French Navy have borne the name Didon in honour of Dido:

- French frigate Didon (1787), a Méduse-class 40-gun frigate.
- Didon (1805), a Virginie-class 40-gun frigate.
- Duchesse de Berry (1816), a 46-gun frigate, bore the name Didon during her career.
- French frigate Didon (1828), a 60-gun Dryade-class first rank frigate.
