= List of shipwrecks in May 1836 =

The list of shipwrecks in May 1836 includes ships sunk, foundered, wrecked, grounded, or otherwise lost during May 1836.

== 1 May ==
List of shipwrecks: 1 May 1836
| Ship | State | Description |
|---|---|---|
| Comet | Hamburg | The ship was wrecked near Porto, Portugal. She was on a voyage from Hamburg to Porto. |
| Dart | United Kingdom | The ship capsized at Newport, Monmouthshire. |
| Margaret | United Kingdom | The ship sprang a leak and was beached in "Kasterwick Bay". She was on a voyage from Saint Petersburg, Russia, to London. Margaret was later refloated and put into Reval, Russia. |
| Prince Leopold | United Kingdom | The ship sprang a leak and was beached on the coast of Pembrokeshire. She was on a voyage from Cardiff, Glamorgan, to Liverpool, Lancashire. |

== 2 May ==
List of shipwrecks: 2 May 1836
| Ship | State | Description |
|---|---|---|
| Caledonian | United Kingdom | The ship was driven ashore and wrecked at Winterton-on-Sea, Norfolk with the loss of two lives. |
| Evangelist | Belgium | The ship was driven ashore at "Waldaw", France. She was on a voyage from Antwerp to Constantinople, Ottoman Empire. |
| Frederick and Betsy | United Kingdom | The schooner capsized off Wells-next-the-Sea, Norfolk, with the loss of all hands. She was on a voyage from Boston, Lincolnshire, to London |
| Gleniffer | United Kingdom | The paddle steamer struck the Buck Rocks, off Penzance, Cornwall, and foundered. She was on a voyage from Greenock, Renfrewshire, to Dartmouth, Devon. |
| Marie | France | The ship collided with another vessel and sank at Havre de Grâce, Seine-Inférieure. She was on a voyage from Bordeaux, Gironde, to Havre de Grâce. |
| Parker | United Kingdom | The ship sank at Shoeburyness, Essex. Her crew were rescued. She was on a voyage from Hartlepool, County Durham, to London. |
| Thomas and Ann or Thomas and Jane | United Kingdom | The ship was driven ashore and wrecked at Burnham Overy Staithe, Norfolk, with the loss of a crew member. |

== 3 May ==
List of shipwrecks: 3 May 1836
| Ship | State | Description |
|---|---|---|
| Albion | United Kingdom | The ship was driven ashore at Portland, Dorset. |
| Bedford | United Kingdom | The ship was driven ashore and wrecked at Lowestoft, Suffolk. Her crew were rescued. |
| Jane | United Kingdom | The ship was driven ashore and sank at Wainfleet, Lincolnshire. Her crew were rescued. She was on a voyage from Boston, Lincolnshire, to Sunderland, County Durham. |
| Mozambique | United Kingdom | The ship was driven ashore at Whitstable, Kent. She was on a voyage from London to Saint John, New Brunswick, British North America. |
| Planter | United Kingdom | The ship ran aground on the Middle Sand, in the North Sea. She floated off and foundered. Her crew were rescued. Planter was on a voyage from Newcastle upon Tyne, Northumberland, to London. |
| Trimdon | United Kingdom | The ship ran aground on the Heap Sand, in the North Sea. She floated off and sank. Her crew were rescued. Trimdon was on a voyage from Sunderland to London. |
| Vier Gebroeders | Netherlands | The ship was driven ashore and wrecked west of Ostend, West Flanders, Belgium. She was on a voyage from Rotterdam, South Holland, to Antwerp, Belgium. |

== 5 May ==
List of shipwrecks: 5 May 1836
| Ship | State | Description |
|---|---|---|
| Felicité | France | The ship was driven ashore 20 nautical miles (37 km) south of St. Ubes, Portugal. She was on a voyage from Port-Vendres, Pyrénées-Orientales to Rouen, Seine-Inférieure. |

== 6 May ==
List of shipwrecks: 6 May 1836
| Ship | State | Description |
|---|---|---|
| Teviotdale | United Kingdom | The ship was wrecked near Cape Breton Island, Nova Scotia, British North America. Her crew were rescued. She was on a voyage from Newcastle upon Tyne, Northumberland, to Quebec City, Lower Canada, British North America. |

== 7 May ==
List of shipwrecks: 7 May 1836
| Ship | State | Description |
|---|---|---|
| Carnation | United Kingdom | The ship was driven ashore in the Gulf of Finland. She was later refloated and put into Helsingør, Denmark. |
| John Heyes | United Kingdom | The ship was driven ashore on the east coast of Hogland, Russia. John Heyes was later refloated and put into Helsingør, where she arrived on 12 May. |
| Ottoman | Kingdom of the Two Sicilies | The ship was wrecked at "Poquestas". She was on a voyage from Palermo to New York, United States. |

== 9 May ==
List of shipwrecks: 9 May 1836
| Ship | State | Description |
|---|---|---|
| Fame | United Kingdom | The ship was wrecked on the La Folie Reef, off Aux Cayes, Haiti. Her crew were rescued. She was on a voyage from Greenock, Renfrewshire, to Aux Cayes. |

== 10 May ==
List of shipwrecks: 10 May 1836
| Ship | State | Description |
|---|---|---|
| Maria | Netherlands | The galiot caught fire off the Isle of Pines, Cuba, and was abandoned. |

== 13 May ==
List of shipwrecks: 13 May 1836
| Ship | State | Description |
|---|---|---|
| Betsey | United Kingdom | The ship sprang a leak and foundered at Newport, Monmouthshire. |
| Brothers | United Kingdom | The ship was driven ashore near the West Quoddy Head Lighthouse, Maine, United States, and sank. She was on a voyage from St. Andrews, New Brunswick, British North America, to Dublin. Brothers was later refloated and taken in to St Andrews, where she was condemned. |
| Catharina | Hamburg | The ship capsized in the North Sea (53°24′N 3°38′E). |
| Santa Maria | United Kingdom | The ship was driven ashore at Maranhão, Empire of Brazil. She was on a voyage from Liverpool, Lancashire, to Maranhão. |

== 14 May ==
List of shipwrecks: 14 May 1836
| Ship | State | Description |
|---|---|---|
| Harriet | United Kingdom | The steamship caught fire in the River Thames and was severely damaged. She was on a voyage from London to Portsmouth, Hampshire. |

== 15 May ==
List of shipwrecks: 15 May 1836
| Ship | State | Description |
|---|---|---|
| St. Johannes | Flag unknown | The ship was driven ashore on Skagen, Denmark. She was on a voyage from Newcastle upon Tyne, Northumberland, United Kingdom, to "Holbeck". |

== 16 May ==
List of shipwrecks: 16 May 1836
| Ship | State | Description |
|---|---|---|
| Trois Jules | France | The ship sprang a leak and was beached at Sines, Portugal. She was on a voyage from Toulon, Var to Dunkirk, Nord. |

== 18 May ==
List of shipwrecks: 18 May 1836
| Ship | State | Description |
|---|---|---|
| Charles Guillaume | France | The ship was driven ashore on Antigua. She was on a voyage from Bordeaux, Gironde, to Guadeloupe. |

== 20 May ==
List of shipwrecks: 20 May 1836
| Ship | State | Description |
|---|---|---|
| Courier | France | The ship ran aground and sank at Le Croisic, Loire-Inférieure. She was on a voyage from Le Croisic to Newfoundland, British North America. |
| Vicissitude | United Kingdom | The ship was wrecked in the Maldive Islands. Her crew were rescued. She was on a voyage from Mauritius to Calcutta, India. |

== 21 May ==
List of shipwrecks: 21 May 1836
| Ship | State | Description |
|---|---|---|
| Pollux | United Kingdom | The ship sprang a leak and sank at Weymouth, Dorset. She was on a voyage from Portland, Dorset, to London. |
| Tigris | United Kingdom | The paddle steamer capsized and sank in the Euphrates during a squall with the loss of twenty lives. |

== 22 May ==
List of shipwrecks: 22 May 1836
| Ship | State | Description |
|---|---|---|
| Albany | United Kingdom | The ship sprang a leak and was beached at Wick, Caithness, where she caught fire owing to her cargo of quicklime getting wet. She was on a voyage from Sunderland, County Durham, to Wick. |
| Jane and Mary | United Kingdom | The ship ran aground on the Nore. |
| Lancaster | United Kingdom | The ship was driven ashore on "Table Island". All on board were rescued. She was on a voyage from New York, United States, to Dublin. |

== 23 May ==
List of shipwrecks: 23 May 1836
| Ship | State | Description |
|---|---|---|
| Lerwick | United Kingdom | The ship was driven ashore and wrecked on Brier Island, Nova Scotia, British North America. All on board were rescued. She was on a voyage from Donegal to Saint John, New Brunswick, British North America. |

== 24 May ==
List of shipwrecks: 24 May 1836
| Ship | State | Description |
|---|---|---|
| Aurora | Sweden | The ship was wrecked on the Haisborough Sands, in the North Sea off the coast of Norfolk, United Kingdom. Her crew were rescued by Britannia (United Kingdom). Aurora was on a voyage from Stockholm to London, United Kingdom. |

== 25 May ==
List of shipwrecks: 25 May 1836
| Ship | State | Description |
|---|---|---|
| Commercium | Bremen | The ship was wrecked on the Kentish Knock or the Long Sand, in the North Sea off the coast of Kent, United Kingdom. She was on a voyage from Bremen to Gloucester, United Kingdom. |
| Didon | French Navy | The Dryade-class frigate ran aground on the south coast of Saint Croix. She was later refloated and taken in to Frederickstadt. |
| Harrier | United Kingdom | The ship was driven ashore and wrecked at Weymouth, Dorset. |
| Mary | United Kingdom | The ship struck the pier and sank at Sunderland, County Durham. |
| Poll | United Kingdom | The ship was driven ashore at Weymouth. |
| Stirling Castle | United Kingdom | Stirling Castle. The brig was wrecked on Swaines reef, in the Pacific Ocean off Rockhampton, New South Wales. She was on a voyage from Sydney, New South Wales, to Singapore. |

== 26 May ==
List of shipwrecks: 26 May 1836
| Ship | State | Description |
|---|---|---|
| Cyrus | United Kingdom | The ship was holed by her anchor and sank at Great Yarmouth, Norfolk. She was on a voyage from Great Yarmouth to Liverpool, Lancashire. |

== 27 May ==
List of shipwrecks: 27 May 1836
| Ship | State | Description |
|---|---|---|
| Anfield | United Kingdom | The ship was driven ashore and wrecked on Barren Island, Brooklyn, New York, United States. Her crew were rescued. She was on a voyage from Liverpool, Lancashire, to New York. |
| Regulus | United Kingdom | The ship departed from The Downs for Bermuda. No further trace, presumed foundered with the loss of all hands. |
| Sancho Panza | Flag unknown | The ship was driven ashore at Blackball Head, County Cork, United Kingdom. She was on a voyage from the Mediterranean to Liverpool. Sancho Panza was refloated the next day and taken in to Youghall, County Cork, in a leaky condition. |

== 30 May ==
List of shipwrecks: 30 May 1836
| Ship | State | Description |
|---|---|---|
| Jean | United Kingdom | The ship was driven ashore at the Point of Ayr, Cheshire. She was on a voyage from Strangford, County Antrim, to Liverpool, Lancashire. |
| Premier | United Kingdom | The ship was destroyed by fire at Ascension Island. She was on a voyage from Madras, India, to London. |

== 31 May ==
List of shipwrecks: 31 May 1836
| Ship | State | Description |
|---|---|---|
| Douglas | United States | The ship was wrecked near "Walsh Wood". Her crew were rescued. She was on a voyage from Jamaica to Norfolk, Virginia. |
| Nueva Esperanza | Spain | The ship was wrecked in the Abaco Islands. She was on a voyage from Barcelona to Havana, Cuba. |

== Unknown date ==
List of shipwrecks: Unknown date in May 1836
| Ship | State | Description |
|---|---|---|
| Catharina | Flag unknown | The ship was wrecked in the North Sea (53°24′N 3°38′E) on or before 19 May. |
| Charles | United States | The ship foundered off Cape Clear Island, County Cork, with the loss of nearly 300 lives. Twelve crew were rescued. She was on a voyage from Liverpool, Lancashire, United Kingdom, to an American port. |
| Craster | United Kingdom | The ship was lost off Ramsgate, Kent. |
| Dispatch | United Kingdom | The brig was abandoned in the Atlantic Ocean before 18 May. |
| Elizabeth | United States | The whaler was wrecked on North Cape, New Zealand, with the loss of all hands. |
| Englishman | United Kingdom | The ship ran aground and was wrecked at the mouth of the River Tees. She was on a voyage from Dublin to Stockton-on-Tees, County Durham. |
| George Canning | United Kingdom | The ship was wrecked on the Heaps Sandbank, in the North Sea off the coast of County Durham, before 4 May. She was on a voyage from Hartlepool, County Durham, to London. |
| Lady Dundas | United Kingdom | The ship ran aground on the Dragor Reef before 12 May and was damaged. She was on a voyage from Riga, Russia, to Dundee, Forfarshire. Lady Dundas was refloated and taken in to Copenhagen, Denmark, for repairs. |
| Percys | United Kingdom | The ship was wrecked near Swansea, Glamorgan. She was on a voyage from Carmarthen to Gloucester. |
