= The Dryad =

The Dryad(s) may refer to:

== Music ==
- Die Dryaden or The Dryads, ballet composed by Ludwig Minkus
- The Dryad (Sibelius) or Dryadi, a composition by Jean Sibelius for orchestra
- The Dryad, ballet composed by Dora Bright
- The Dryad, ballet composed by Paul Corder

== Literature ==
- Dryaden or The Dryad, a fairy tale by Hans Christian Andersen
- The Dryad, work by Justin Huntly McCarthy

== TV ==
- "The Dryad", an episode of Canadian/Australian TV series Guinevere Jones

== Animals ==
- The dryad (Minois dryas), a species of butterfly

== See also ==
- Dryad
- Dryad (disambiguation)
