= French frigate Guerrière (1860) =

Sail and steam frigate of the French Navy

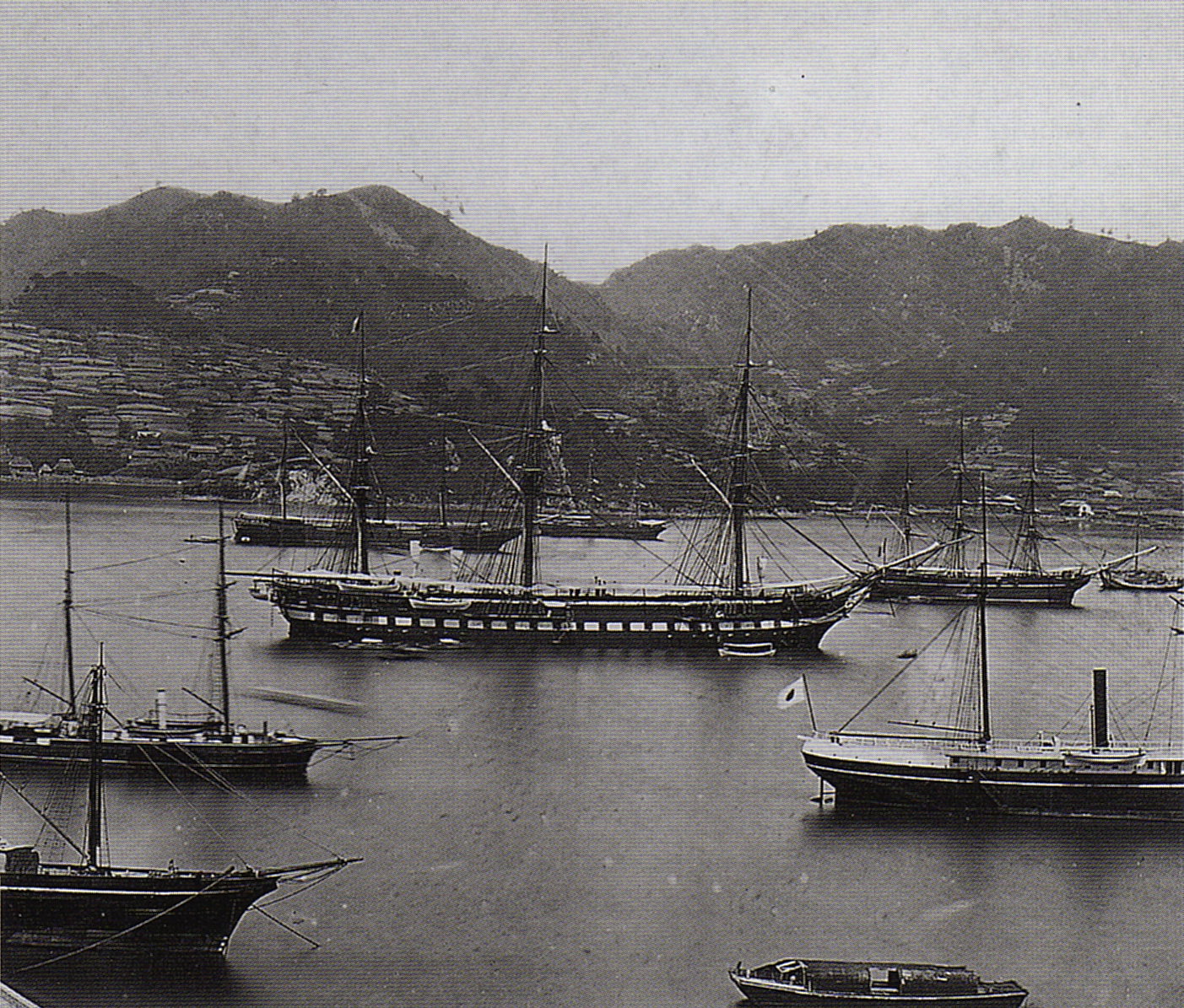
- Guerrière in Nagasaki harbour, 1865.

History

France
- Name: Guerrière
- Namesake: "Warrior"
- Builder: Brest
- Laid down: 8 June 1848
- Launched: 3 May 1860
- Decommissioned: 28 May 1888

General characteristics
- Class & type: Dryade-class frigate
- Tons burthen: 3,600 tons
- Propulsion: Sails; 2,400 shp (1,800 kW) Creuzot steam engine, 1 retractable propeller
- Complement: 475 men (230 if armed en flûte)
- Armament: 34 guns

Guerrière was a sail and steam Dryade-class frigate of the French Navy. She is known as the flagship of Admiral Pierre-Gustave Roze during the French campaign against Korea in 1866.

== Career ==
Built as a 56-gun sail frigate on a design by Boucher and Masson, Guerrière was transformed by jumboisation of the steam engine section in October 1866. As such, under Captain Olivier, she became Pierre-Gustave Roze's flagship during the French campaign against Korea in 1866. On 30 August 1867, Guerrière was severely damaged in a typhoon in the South China Sea whilst on a voyage from Japan to Hong Kong, China.

In 1869, she was transformed into a troopship by addition of a second covered deck. In 1871, she was used to ferry German war prisoners after the Franco-Prussian War. The next year, under Commander Charles Boucarut, she transported prisoners of the Paris Commune sentenced to deportation to New Caledonia.

In the following years, she shuttled between France and Algeria before being hulked in 1889 and broken up around 1913.

A model of Guerrière is on display at the Musée national de la Marine, inside a dry dock.

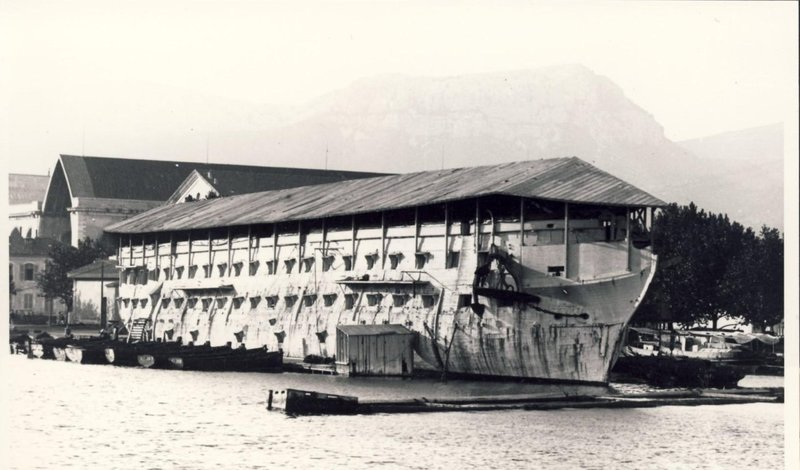
Guerrière as a hulk, photographed by Marius Bar around 1900

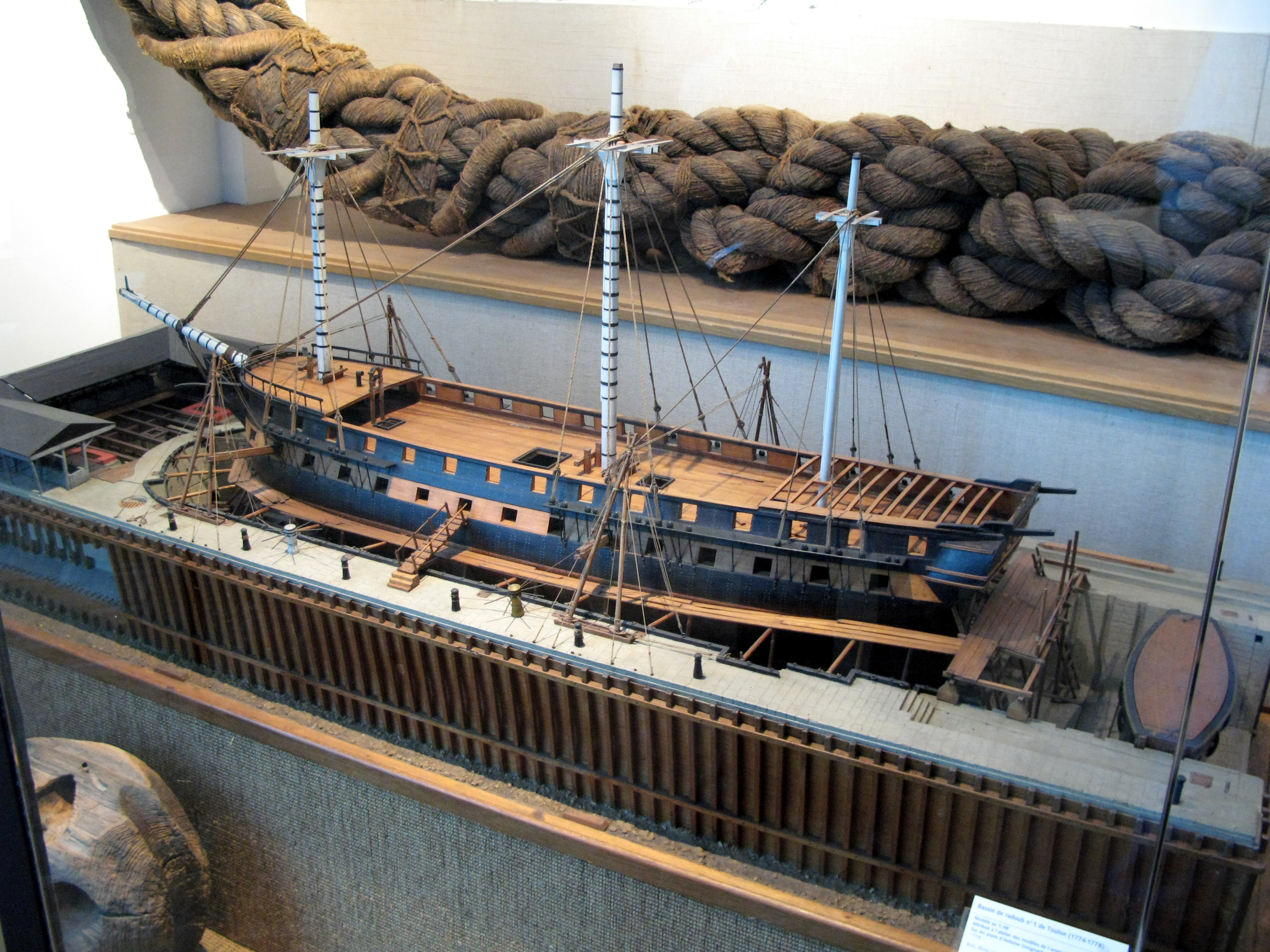
1/48 scale model of dry dock n°1 of Toulon harbour, with the model of Guerrière placed inside by order of Admiral Pâris.
