= Louis Beaulieu =

French missionary

Saint Louis Beaulieu
- Born: October 8, 1840; Langon, Gironde, France
- Died: April 8, 1866 (aged 25)
- Feast: September 20 (Roman calendar, along with The Korean Martyrs)

Louis Beaulieu (8 October 1840, Langon – 8 March 1866) in Korea, was one of the priests of the Paris Foreign Missions Society who was among the 103 Korean Martyrs.

Beaulieu was ordinated on the 21 of May 1864, and left for Korea on 15 July. His mission proved very difficult, as the district he was assigned to prohibited the presence of foreigners, especially preachers. Beaulieu hid in the mountains for some time, but was ultimately arrested, judged, and decapitated on 8 March 1866. His and other Catholic missionaries' deaths in Korea were followed by a French punitive expedition which reinforced the Korean policy of isolationism.

Beaulieu was beatified October 6, 1968 by Paul VI and canonized May 6, 1984 by John Paul II.

== See also ==
- Catholic Church in Korea
