= French expedition to Korea =

1866 French military campaign

French Intervention to Korea 병인양요/丙寅洋擾 Expédition française en Corée
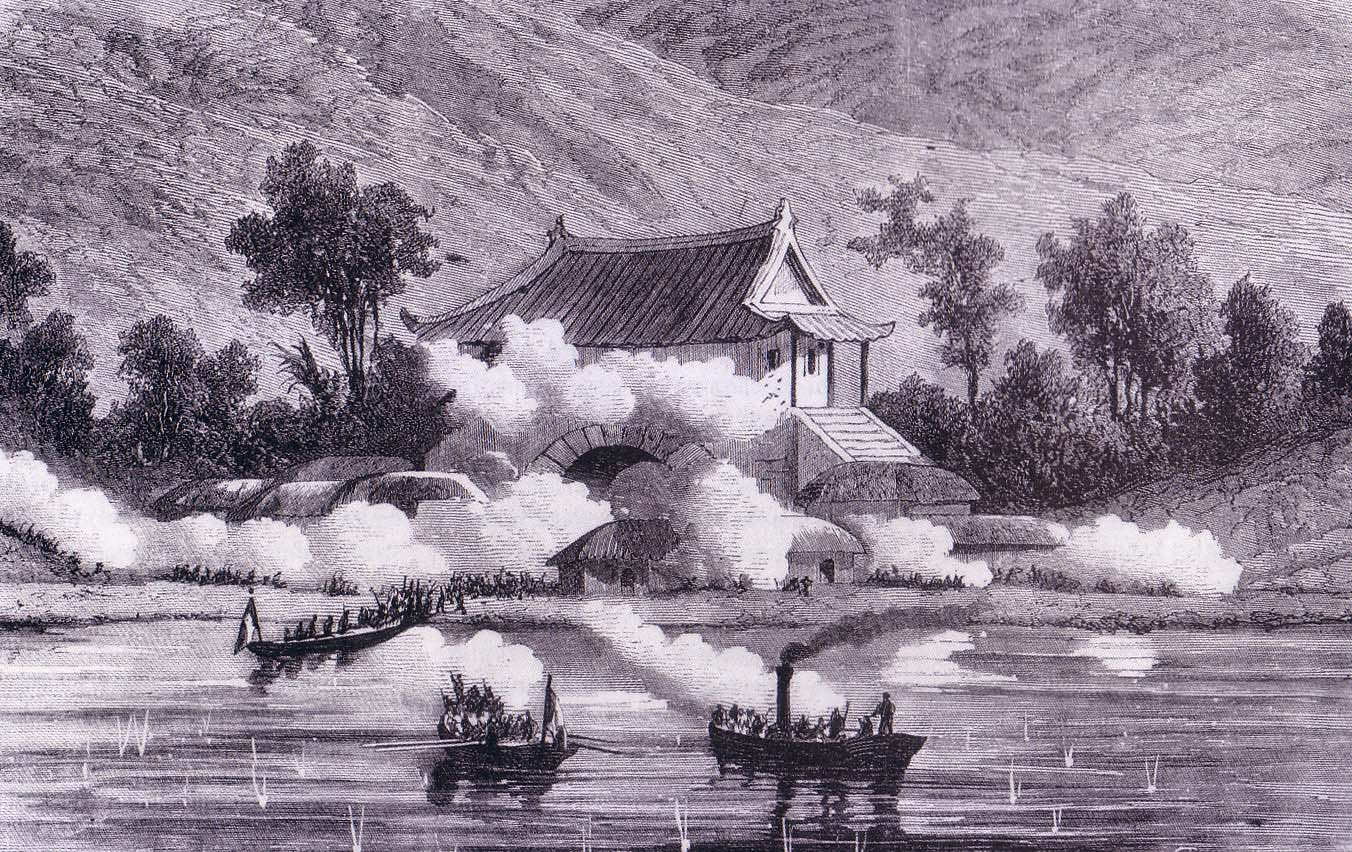
- French fleet in Ganghwa, Choseon
Date	11 October – 22 November 1866 (1 month, 1 week and 4 days)
Location	Predominantly Ganghwa Island, some small engagements on the Korean Peninsula
Result	Joseon victory

Belligerents
Joseon dynasty	Second French Empire

Commanders and leaders
Heungseon Daewongun; Yang Heon-su; Yi Yong-hui; Yi Gyeong-ha; Yi Gi-jo; Shin Heon; Han Seong-geun; Eo Jae-yeon	Pierre-Gustave Roze; Cap. Olivier; Com. Bochet; Lt. Thouars

Strength
10,000	600; 1 frigate 2 corvettes 2 gunboats 2 dispatch boats

Casualties and losses
5 killed (3 at Munsu Fort); 2 wounded (at Munsu Fort); 2 missing	3 killed 35 wounded

- Korean name
- Hangul: 병인양요
- Hanja: 丙寅洋擾
- Revised Romanization: Byeongin yangyo
- McCune–Reischauer: Pyŏngin yangyo

The French Intervention to Korea (French: Expédition française en Corée, Korean: 병인양요 (Note: The Korean name for the event (Byeongin-yangyo) can be roughly translated as "Western Disturbance of the Byeongin Year", where "Byeongin" refers to the year of the event using the sexagenary cycle calendar.)) was an 1866 punitive expedition undertaken by the Second French Empire against Joseon Korea in retaliation for the execution of seven French Catholic missionaries. The encounter over Ganghwa Island lasted nearly six weeks. The result was an eventual French retreat, and a check on French influence in the region. The encounter also confirmed Korea in its isolationism for another decade, until Japan forced it to open up to trade in 1876 through the Treaty of Ganghwa.

In contemporary South Korea it is known as the Byeongin yangyo, or "Western disturbance of the byeongin year".

== Background ==
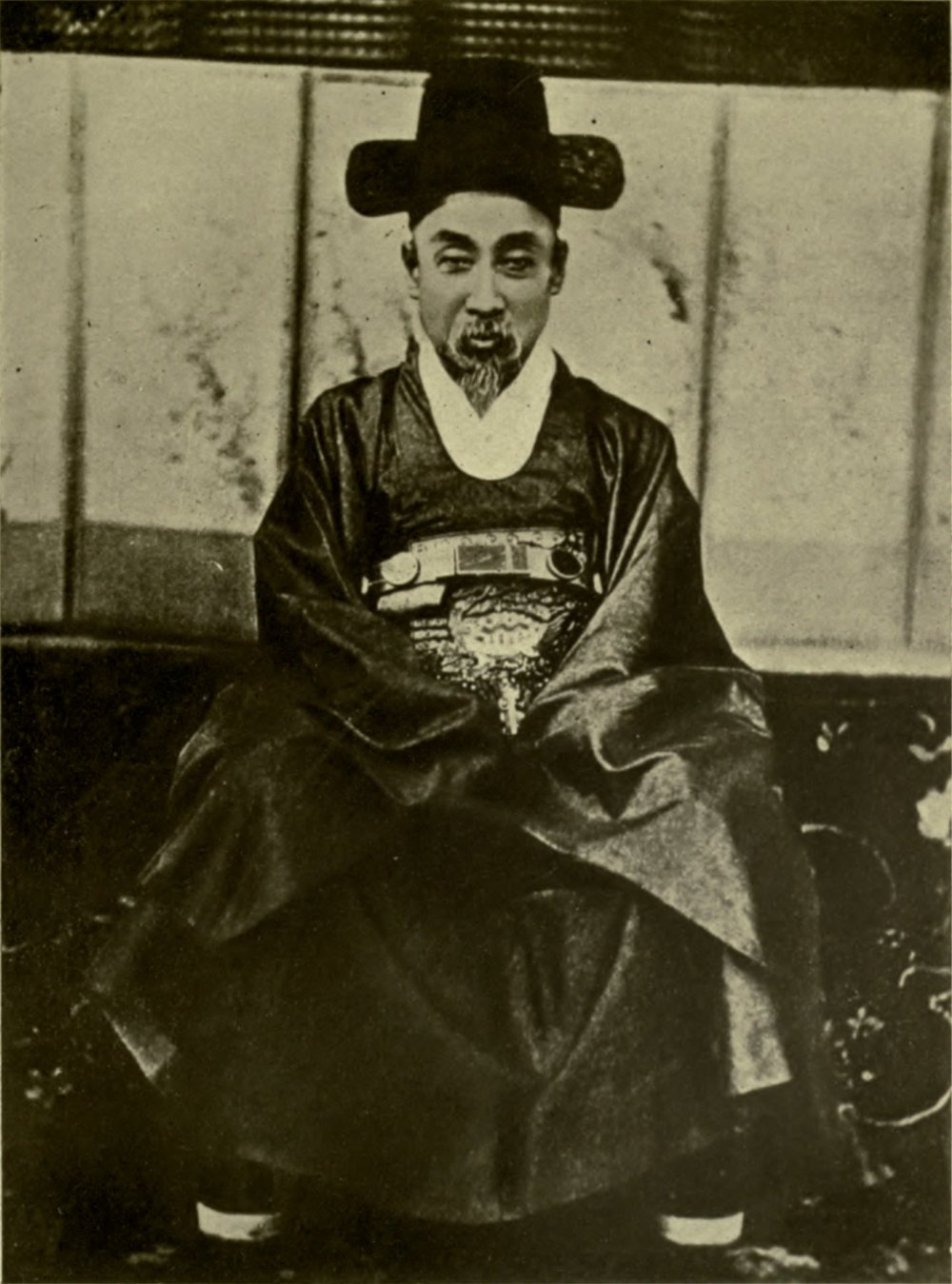
The regent Heungseon Daewongun.

Throughout the history of the Joseon dynasty, Korea maintained a policy of strict isolationism from the outside world (with the exceptions being interaction with the Qing dynasty and occasional trading with Japan through the island of Tsushima). However, it did not entirely succeed in sealing itself off from foreign contact, and Catholic missionaries had shown interest in Korea as early as the 16th century with their arrival in China and Japan.

Through Korean envoy missions to the Qing court in the 18th century, foreign ideas, including Christianity, began to enter Korea and by the late 18th century Korea had its first native Christians. However, it was only in the mid-19th century that the first western Catholic missionaries began to enter Korea. This was done illegally, either via the China–North Korea border or the Yellow Sea. French missionaries of the Paris Foreign Missions Society were able to arrive in Korea in the 1840s to convert an increasingly large number of Koreans. Bishop Siméon-François Berneux, appointed in 1856 as head of the infant Korean Catholic church, estimated in 1859 that the number of Korean faithful had reached nearly 17,000.

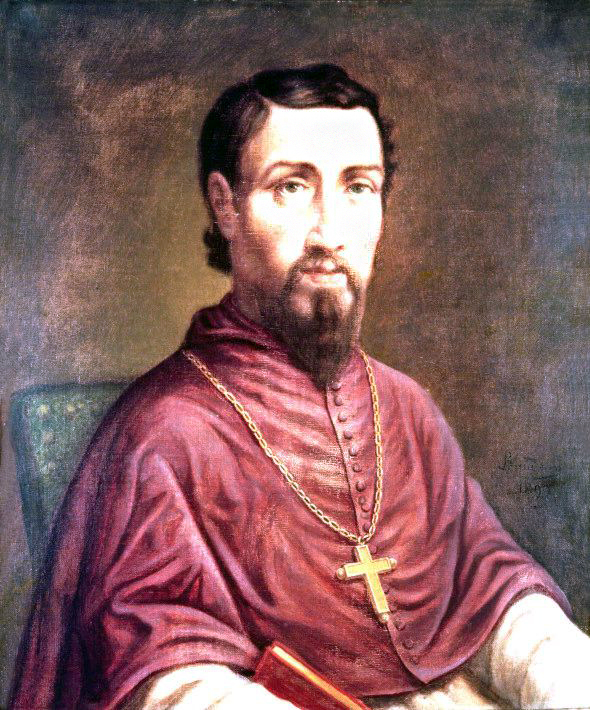
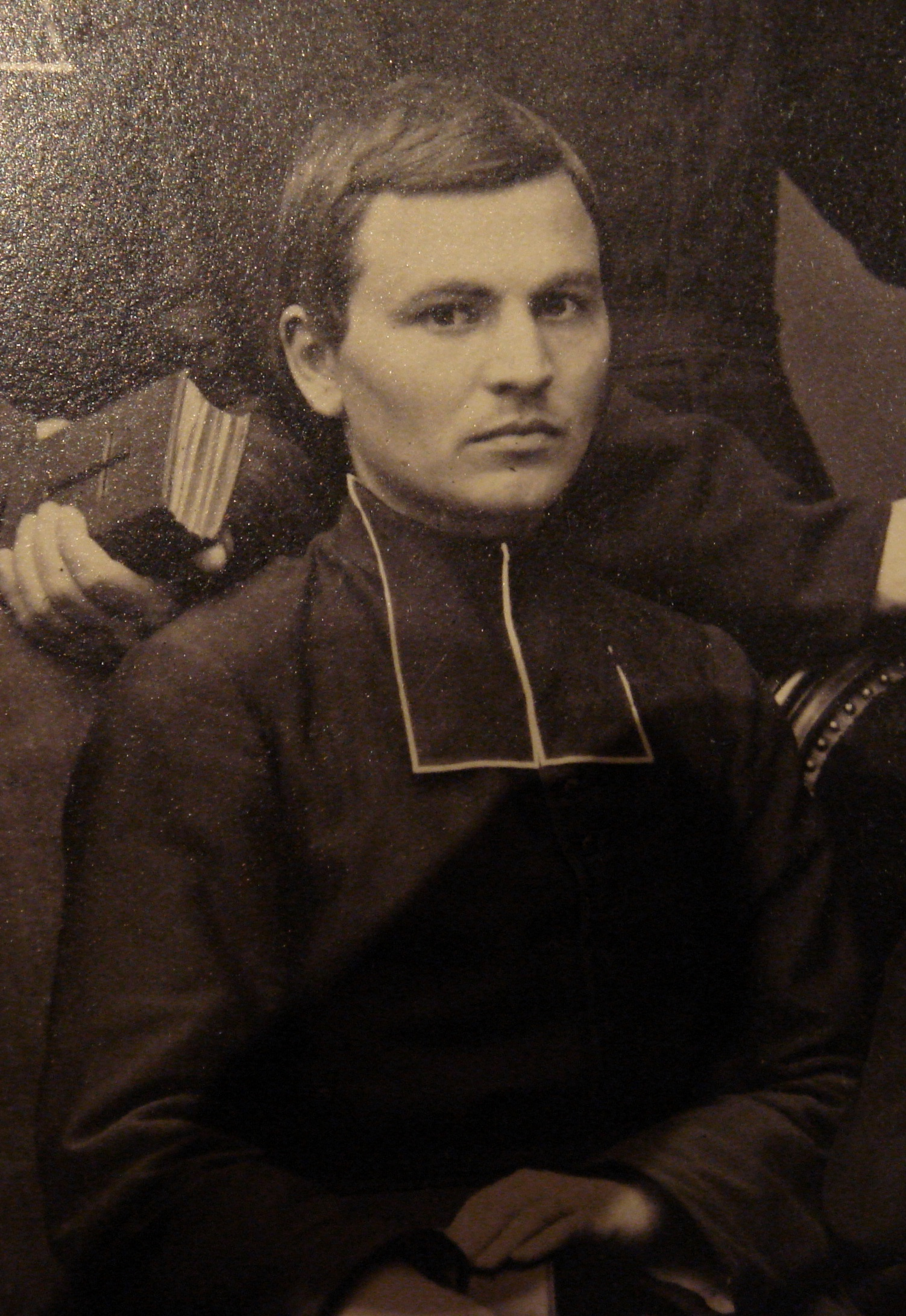
Left: Bishop Berneux of the Paris Foreign Missions Society was tortured and then beheaded on 7 March 1866.
Right: Pierre Henri Dorié of the Paris Foreign Missions Society was also killed in Korea in 1866.

At first, the Korean court turned a blind eye to such incursions. This attitude changed abruptly, however, with the enthronement of the eleven-year-old King Gojong in 1864. By Korean tradition, the regency in the case of a minority would go to the ranking dowager queen. In this case, it was the conservative mother of the previous crown prince, who had died before he could ascend the throne. The new king's father, Yi Ha-ung, a wily and ambitious man in his early forties, was given the traditional title of the unreigning father of a king: Heungseon Daewongun, or "Prince of the Great Court".

Though the Heungseon Daewongun's authority at court was not official, stemming in fact from the traditional imperative in Confucian societies for sons to obey their fathers, he quickly seized the initiative and began to control state policy. He was arguably one of the most effective and forceful leaders of the 500-year-old Joseon Dynasty. With the aged dowager regent's blessing, the Heungseon Daewongun set out upon a dual campaign of both strengthening central authority and isolation from the disintegrating traditional order outside its borders. By the time the Heungseon Daewongun assumed de facto control of the government in 1864, there were twelve French Jesuit priests living and preaching in Korea, and an estimated 23,000 native Korean converts.

In January 1866, Russian ships appeared on the east coast of Korea demanding trading and residency rights in what seemed an echo of the demands made on China by other western powers. Korean Christians with connections at court saw in this an opportunity to advance their cause and suggested an alliance between France and Korea to repel the Russian advances, suggesting further that this alliance could be negotiated through Bishop Berneux. The Heungseon Daewongun seemed open to this idea, but it was possibly a ruse to bring the head of the Korean Catholic Church out into the open; upon Berneux's arrival to the capital in February 1866, he was seized and executed. A round-up then began of the other French Catholic priests and Korean converts.

Several factors contributed to the Heungseon Daewongun's decision to suppress the Catholics. Perhaps the most obvious was the lesson provided by China, that it had apparently reaped nothing but hardship and humiliation from its dealing with the western powers – seen most recently in its disastrous defeat during the Second Opium War. No doubt also fresh in the Heungseon Daewongun's mind was the example of the Taiping Rebellion in China, which had been infused with Christian doctrines, and in 1858, he saw the conquest of Vietnam by the French. 1865 had seen poor harvests in Korea as well as social unrest, which may have contributed to a heightened sensitivity to the foreign creed. The crackdown may also have been related to attempts to combat factional cliques at court, where Christianity had made some inroads.

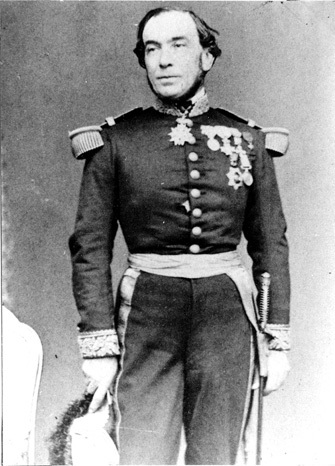
Rear Admiral Roze was commander of the French Far Eastern Squadron.

As a result of the Korean dragnet, all but three of the French missionaries were captured and executed: among them included Bishop Siméon Berneux, as well as Bishop Antoine Daveluy, Father Just de Bretenières, Father Louis Beaulieu, Father Pierre-Henri Dorie, Father Pierre Aumaître, Father Martin-Luc Huin – all of whom were members of the Paris Foreign Missions Society, and were canonized by Pope John Paul II on 6 May 1984. An untold number of Korean Catholics also met their end (estimations run around 10,000), many being executed at a place called Jeoldu-san in Seoul on the banks of the Han River.

In late June 1866, one of the three surviving French missionaries, Father Félix-Claire Ridel, managed to escape via a fishing vessel, thanks to 11 Korean converts, and made his way to Yantai, China in early July 1866. Fortuitously in Tianjin at the time of Ridel's arrival was the commander of the French Far Eastern Squadron, Rear Admiral Pierre-Gustave Roze. Hearing of the massacre and the affront to French national honor, Roze became determined to launch a punitive expedition against Korea. In this, he was strongly supported by the acting French consul in Peking, Henri de Bellonet.

On the French side, there were several compelling reasons behind the decision to launch a punitive expedition. These had to do with the increasing violence against Christian missionaries and converts within the Chinese interior, which after the Second Opium War in 1860 had been opened up to westerners. The massacre of westerners and Christians in Korea was seen within the context of anti-Western behavior in China by diplomatic and military authorities in the west. Many believed a firm response to such acts of violence was necessary to maintain national prestige and authority.

In response to the event, the French chargé d'affaires in Beijing, Henri de Bellonet, took a number of initiatives without consulting Quai d'Orsay. Bellonet sent a note to the Zongli Yamen threatening to occupy Korea, and he also gave the French Naval Commander in the Far East, rear admiral Pierre-Gustave Roze instructions to launch a punitive expedition against Korea, to which Roze responded: "Since [the kingdom of] Choson killed nine French priests, we shall avenge by killing 9,000 Koreans."

== Preliminaries (10 September – 3 October 1866) ==
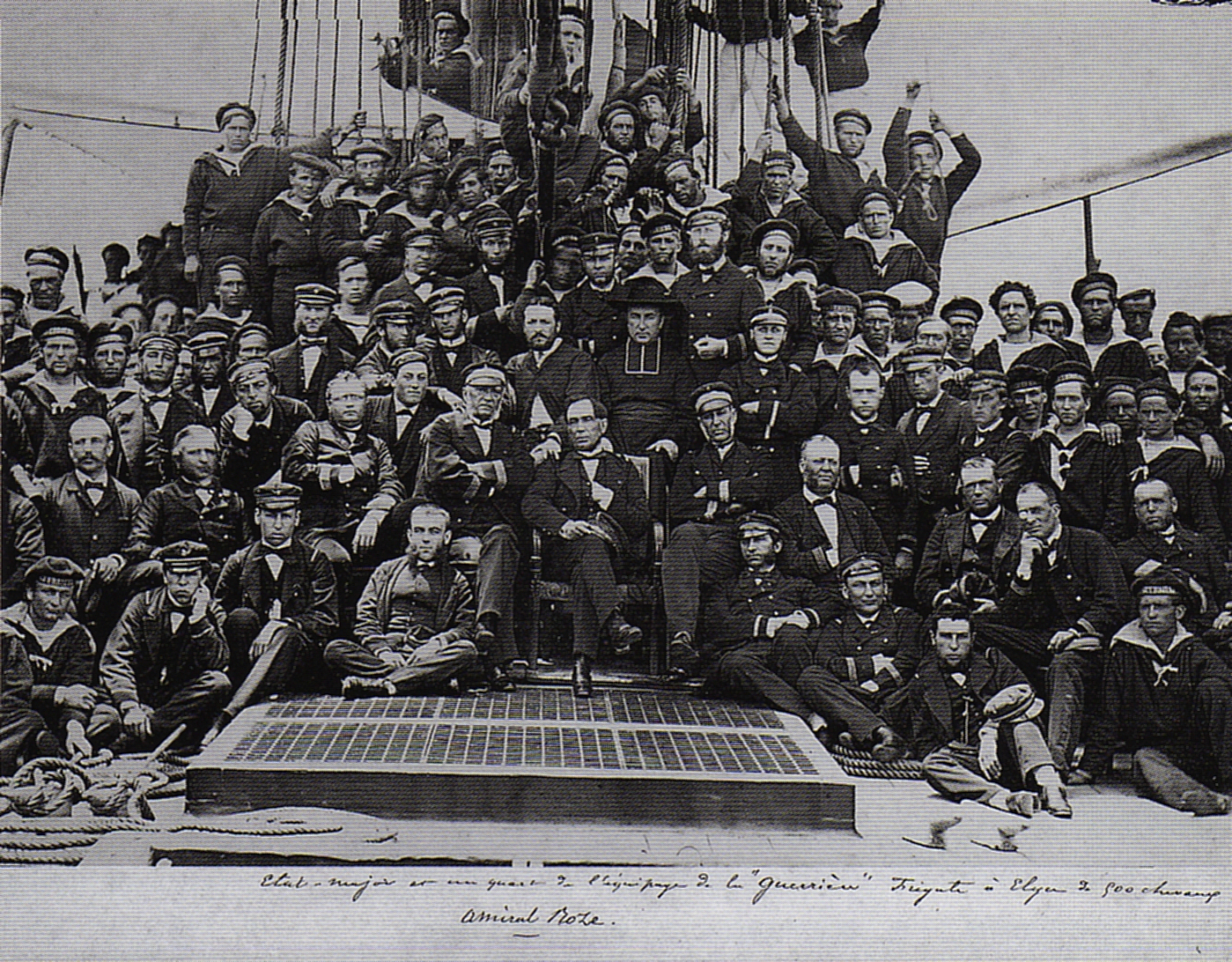
Admiral Roze (centre) and a quarter of his sailors, on the frigate Guerrière. Circa 1865 photograph, during a visit in Nagasaki harbour.

Though the French diplomatic and naval authorities in China were eager to launch an expedition, they were stymied by the almost total absence of any detailed information on Korea, including any navigational charts. Prior to the actual expedition, Rear Admiral Roze decided to undertake a smaller surveying expedition along the Korean coast, especially along the waterway leading to the Korean capital of Seoul. This was done in late September and early October 1866. These preliminaries resulted in some rudimentary navigational charts of the waters around Ganghwa Island and the Han River leading to Seoul. The treacherous nature of these waters, however, also convinced Roze that any movement against the fortified Korean capital with his limited numbers and large-hulled vessels was impossible. Instead, he opted to seize and occupy Ganghwa Island, which commanded the entrance to the Han River, in the hopes of blockading the waterway to the capital during the important harvest season and thus forcing demands and reparations on the Korean court.

The nature that these demands were to take was never fully determined. In Peking, the French consul Bellonet had made outrageous (and as it turned out unofficial) demands that the Korean monarch forfeit his crown and cede sovereignty to France. Such a stance was not in keeping with the more circumspect goals of Rear Admiral Roze, who hoped to force reparations. In any case, the demands of Bellonet were never officially endorsed by the French government of Napoleon III. Bellonet would later be severely reprimanded for his importunate blusterings.

== Expedition (11 October–12 November 1866) ==
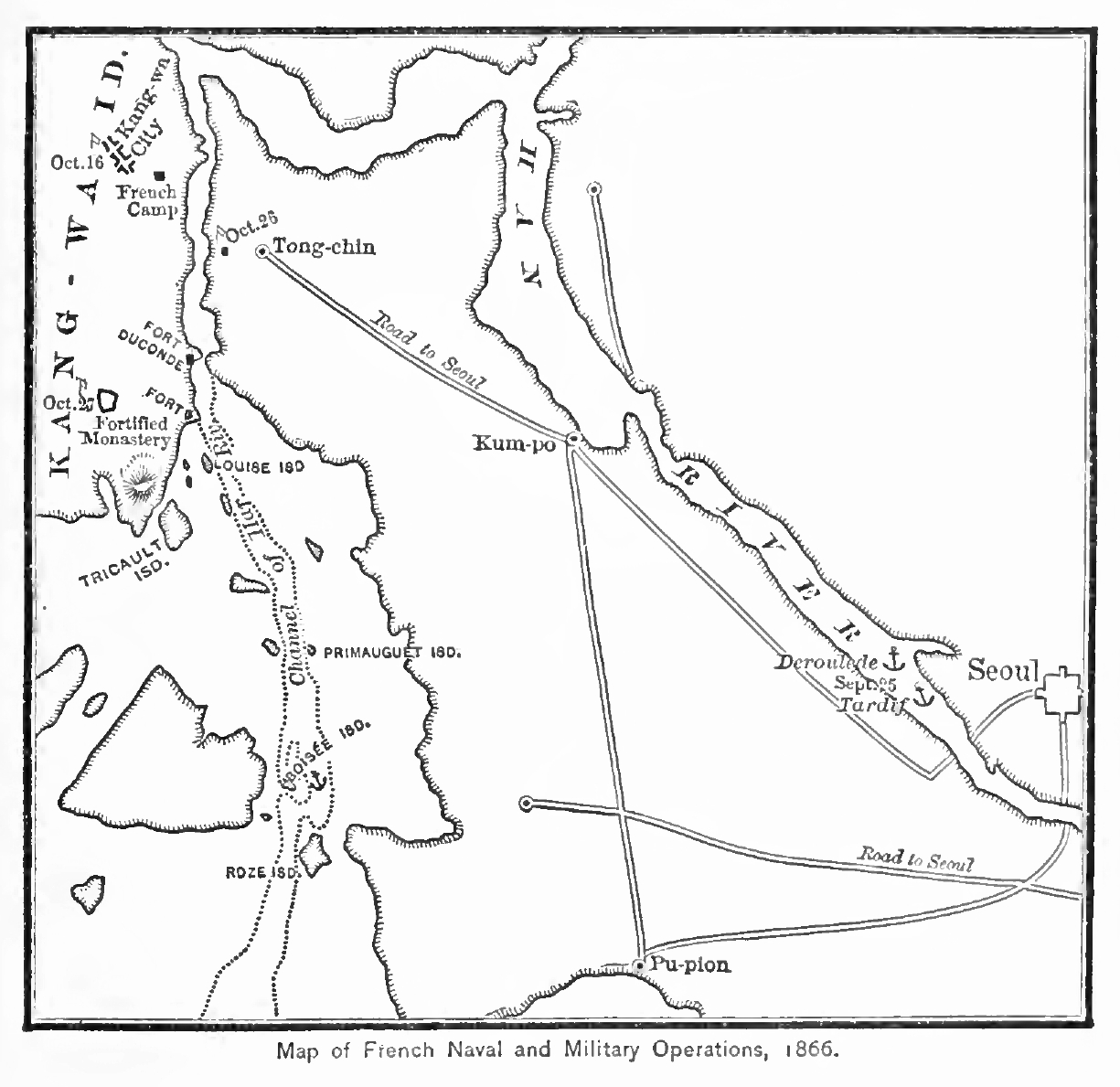
Map illustrating the operation

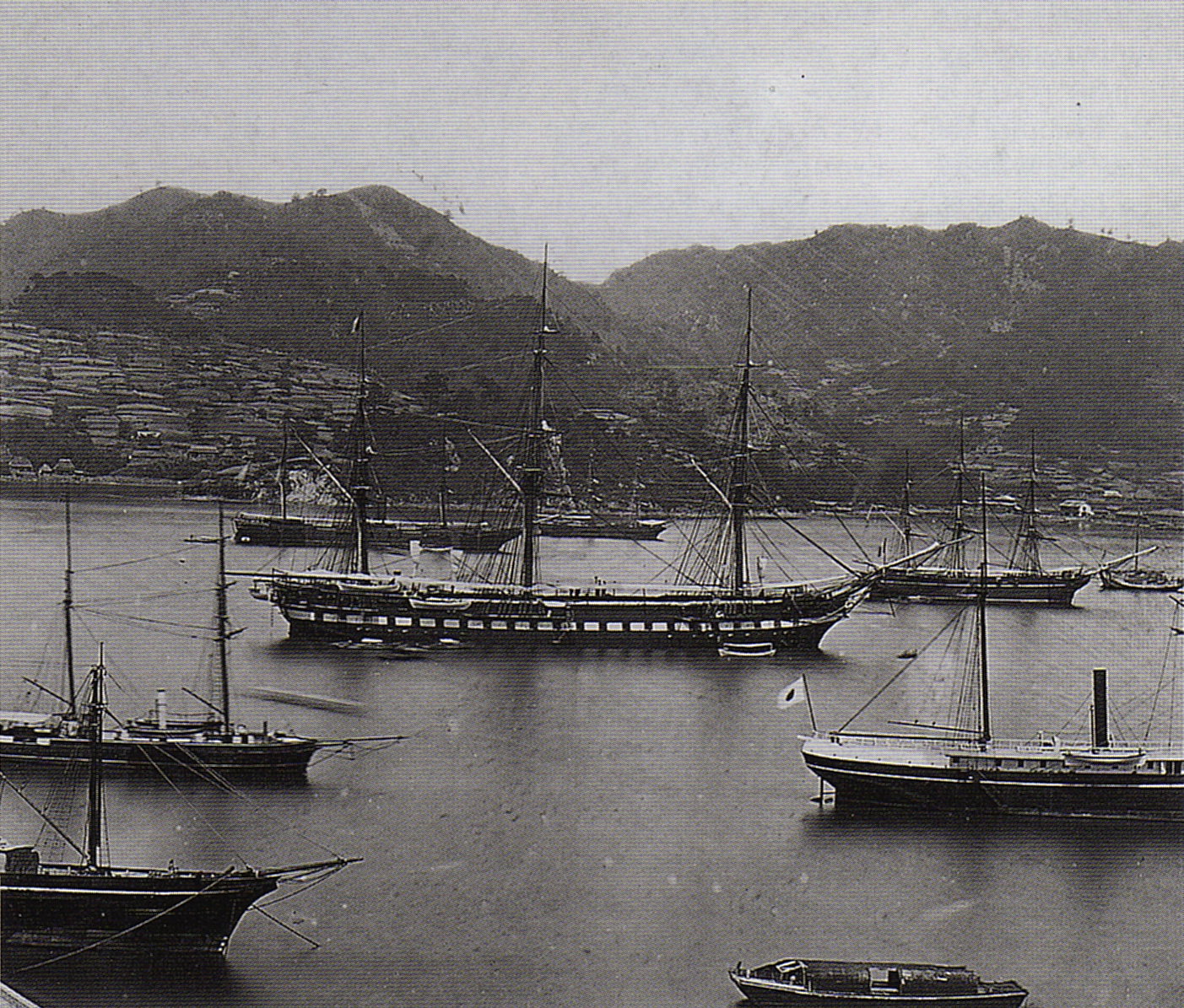
The French frigate Guerrière commanded by Admiral Roze was the lead ship in the French expedition to Korea. Here the vessel is photographed in Nagasaki harbor around 1865.

On 11 October, Admiral Roze left Yantai with one frigate (Guerrière), two avisos (Kien–Chan and Déroulède), two gunboats (Le Brethon and Tardif) and two corvettes (Laplace and Primauguet), as well as almost 300 Naval Fusiliers from their post in Yokohama, Japan. The total number of French troops is estimated at 800. On 16 October, a group of 170 Naval Fusiliers landed on Ganghwa island, seized the fortress which controlled the Han river, and occupied the fortified city of Ganghwa itself. On Ganghwa Island, the Naval Fusiliers managed to seize several fortified positions, as well as booty such as flags, cannons, 8,000 muskets, 23 boxes of silver ingots, a few boxes of gold, and various lacquer works, jades, and manuscripts and paintings that comprised the royal library (Oikyujanggak) on the island.

Roze knew it was impossible for him to lead a fleet of limited force up the treacherous and shallow Han River to the Korean capital and satisfied himself with a "coup de main" on the coast from his earlier exploratory expedition. On the mainland across the narrow channel from Ganghwa Island, however, the French offensive was met with stiff resistance from the troops of General Yi Yong-Hui, to whom Roze sent several letters asking for reparation, without success. A significant blow to the French expedition came on 26 October, when 120 French Naval Fusiliers landed briefly on the Korean mainland in an attempt to seize a small fortification at Munsusansong, or Mt. Munsu Fort (depicted in the illustration above). As the landing party came ashore, they were met by a brisk fire from the defenders.

If the monastery of Munsusansong fell into French hands, the way to Seoul would be open, so, on 7 November, a second landing party was launched by Roze. 160 Naval Fusiliers attacked Munsusansong defended by 543 Korean "Tiger Hunters." Three French soldiers were killed and 36 injured before a retreat was called. Except for continued bombing and surveying activity around Ganghwa and the mouth of the Han River, French forces now largely fortified themselves in and around the city of Ganghwa.

Roze then sent a new letter, asking for the release of the two remaining French missionaries whom he had reason to believe were imprisoned. No answer was forthcoming, but it became clear from activity seen on the mainland across the narrow straits that Korean forces mobilized daily. On 9 November, the French were again checked when they attempted to seize a fortified monastery on the southern coast of Ganghwa called Jeongdeung–sa. Here again, stiff Korean resistance, coupled with the overwhelming numerical superiority of the Korean defenders, now numbering 10,000 men, forced a French retreat with dozens of casualties but no deaths.

Soon after that, with winter approaching and the Korean forces growing stronger, Roze made the strategic decision to evacuate. Before doing so, orders were given to bombard the government buildings on Ganghwa Island and to carry off the varied contents of official storehouses there. It was also learned that the two missing missionaries feared captured in Korea had managed to escape to China around this time. This news contributed to the decision to leave.

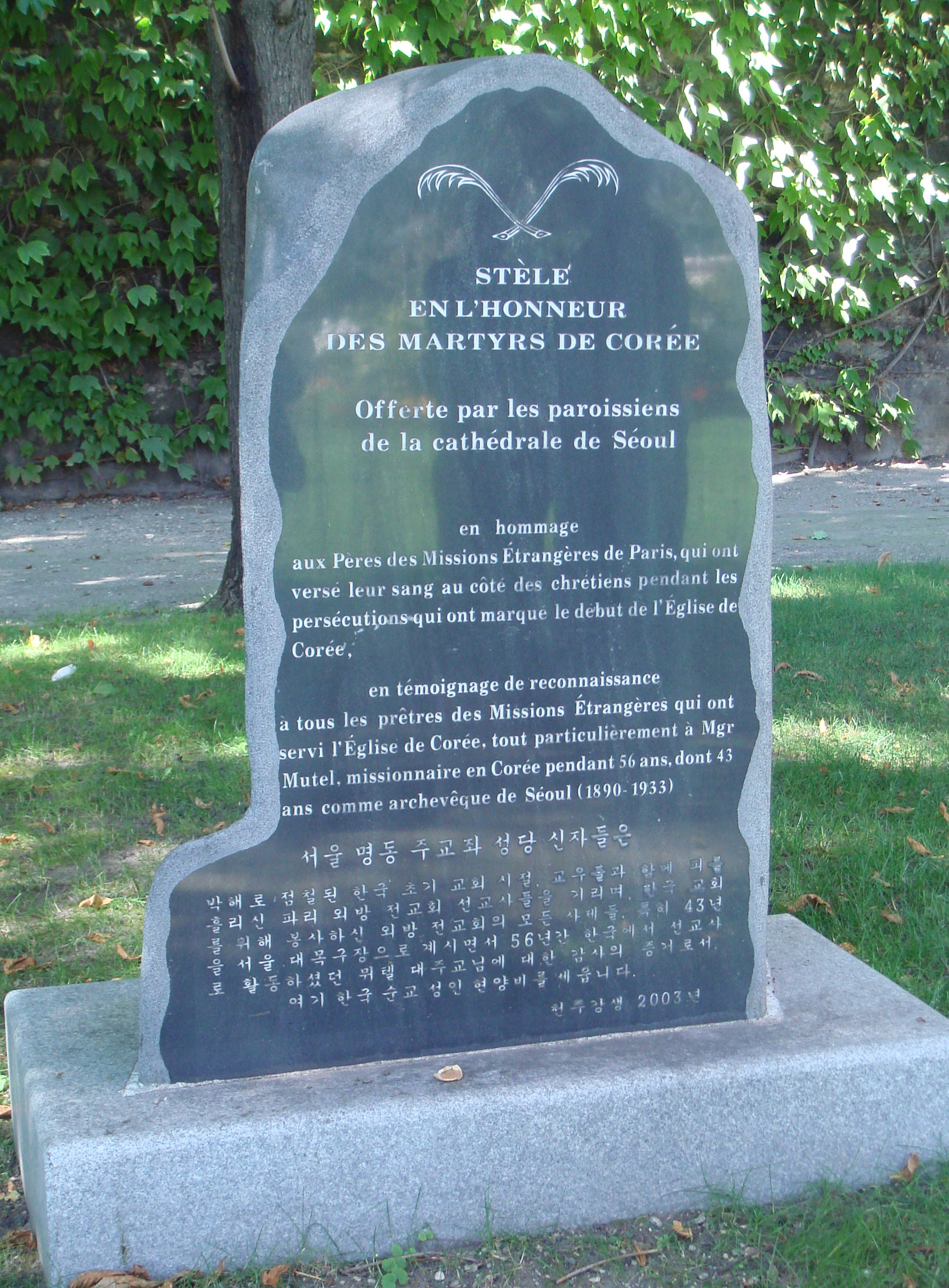
Stela to the martyrs of the Paris Foreign Missions Society in Korea

All told, the French suffered three dead and approximately 35 wounded. In retreating from Korea, Roze attempted to lessen the extent of his retreat by stating that with his limited means, there was little more he could have accomplished but that his actions would have a dissuasive effect upon the Korean government:

"The expedition I just accomplished, however modest as it is, may have prepared the ground for a more serious one if deemed necessary, ... The expedition deeply shocked the Korean Nation by showing her claimed invulnerability was an illusion. Lastly, the destruction of one of the avenues of Seoul and the considerable losses suffered by the Korean government should render it more cautious in the future. The objective I had fixed to myself is thus fully accomplished, and the murder of our missionaries has been avenged." report of 15 November by Admiral Roze

The European residents in China considered the expedition's results minimal and demanded a larger expedition for the following spring unsuccessfully.

After this expedition, Roze, with most of his fleet, returned to Japan, where they were able to welcome the first French military mission to Japan (1867–1868) in the harbor of Yokohama on 13 January 1867. The French government ordered the military to leave due to heavy losses in the French intervention in Mexico.

=== Seized Korean royal books ===
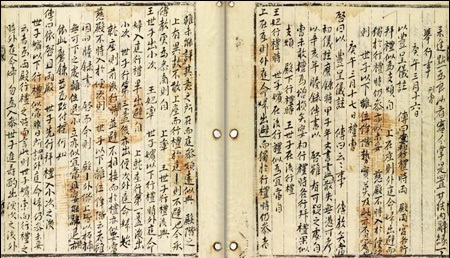
One of the Korean texts of the French National Library

The books seized by the French at Ganghwa, some 297 volumes of Uigwe, royal court protocols of Korea's last ruling monarchy, the Joseon dynasty, dating from between the 14th and 19th centuries, went on to become the core of the Korea collection in the Bibliothèque nationale de France. In 2010 it was revealed that the French government was planning to return the books on a renewable lease to Korea, despite the fact that French law generally prohibited the cession of museum property. In early 2011, South Korean president Lee Myung-bak and French president Nicolas Sarkozy finalized an agreement for the return of all the books on a renewable lease. In June 2011, celebrations were held in the port city of Incheon to commemorate their final return. The collection is now stored in the National Museum of Korea.

== Legacy ==
In the course of these events, in August 1866, the U.S. civilian merchant ship, SS General Sherman foundered on the coast of Korea during an illegal trade mission. Violence ensued between the Koreans and the Americans. The General Sherman was sunk in the dispute, and a number of American merchantmen sailors and Koreans killed. With no verified accounts provided by the Joseon Dynasty about the fate of the General Sherman, the United States offered France a combined operation to recover information on the schooner's fate, but the project was abandoned due to the relatively low interest for Korea at that time. An intervention was launched five years later, in 1871, with the United States Korean expedition.

The Korean government finally agreed to open the country in 1876, when a fleet of the Imperial Japanese Navy was sent under the orders of Kuroda Kiyotaka, leading to the Treaty of Ganghwa.

== See also ==
- General Sherman incident
- United States expedition to Korea
- Ganghwa Island incident (1875)
- French military mission to Japan (1867–1868)
- French people in Korea
