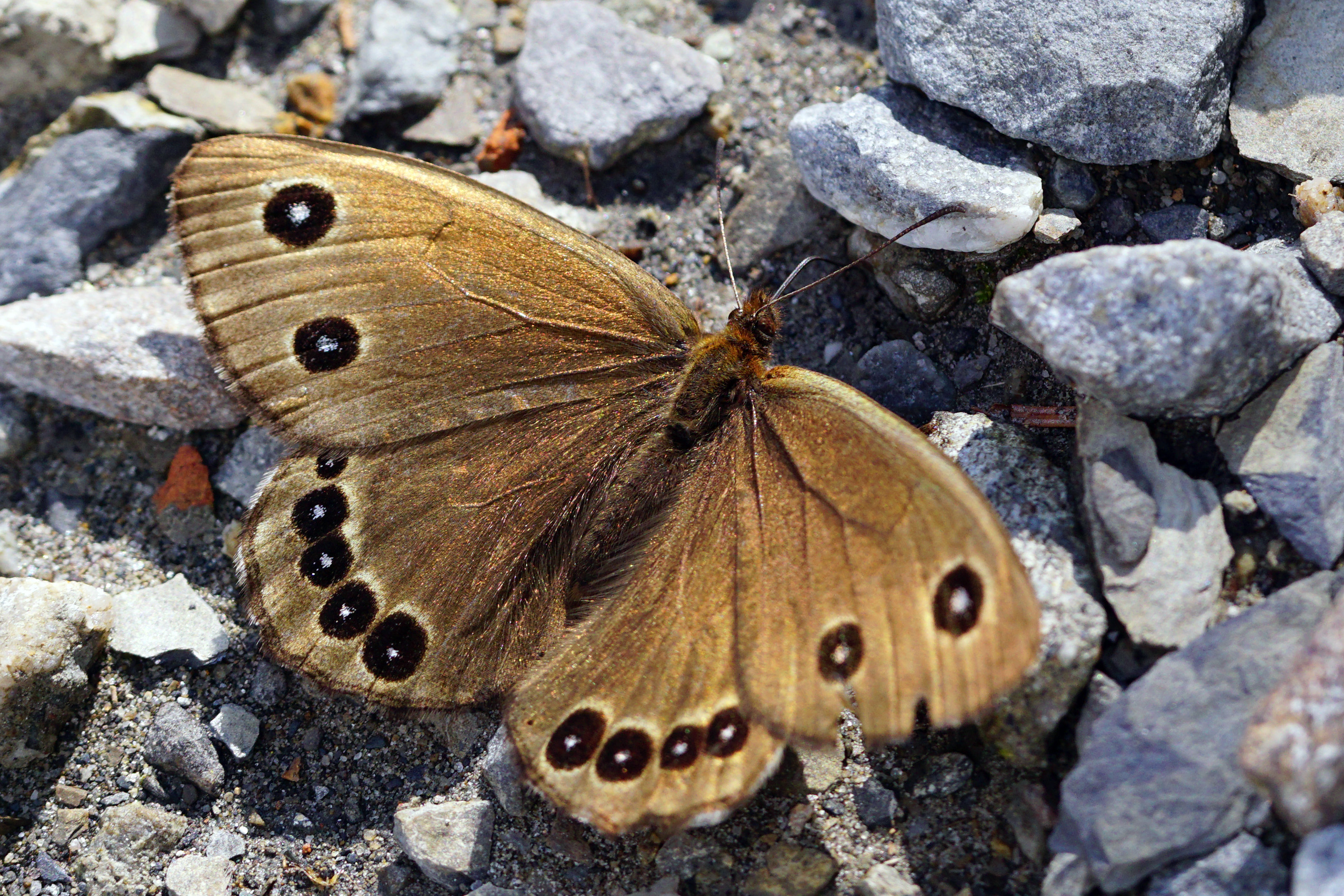
- Upperside
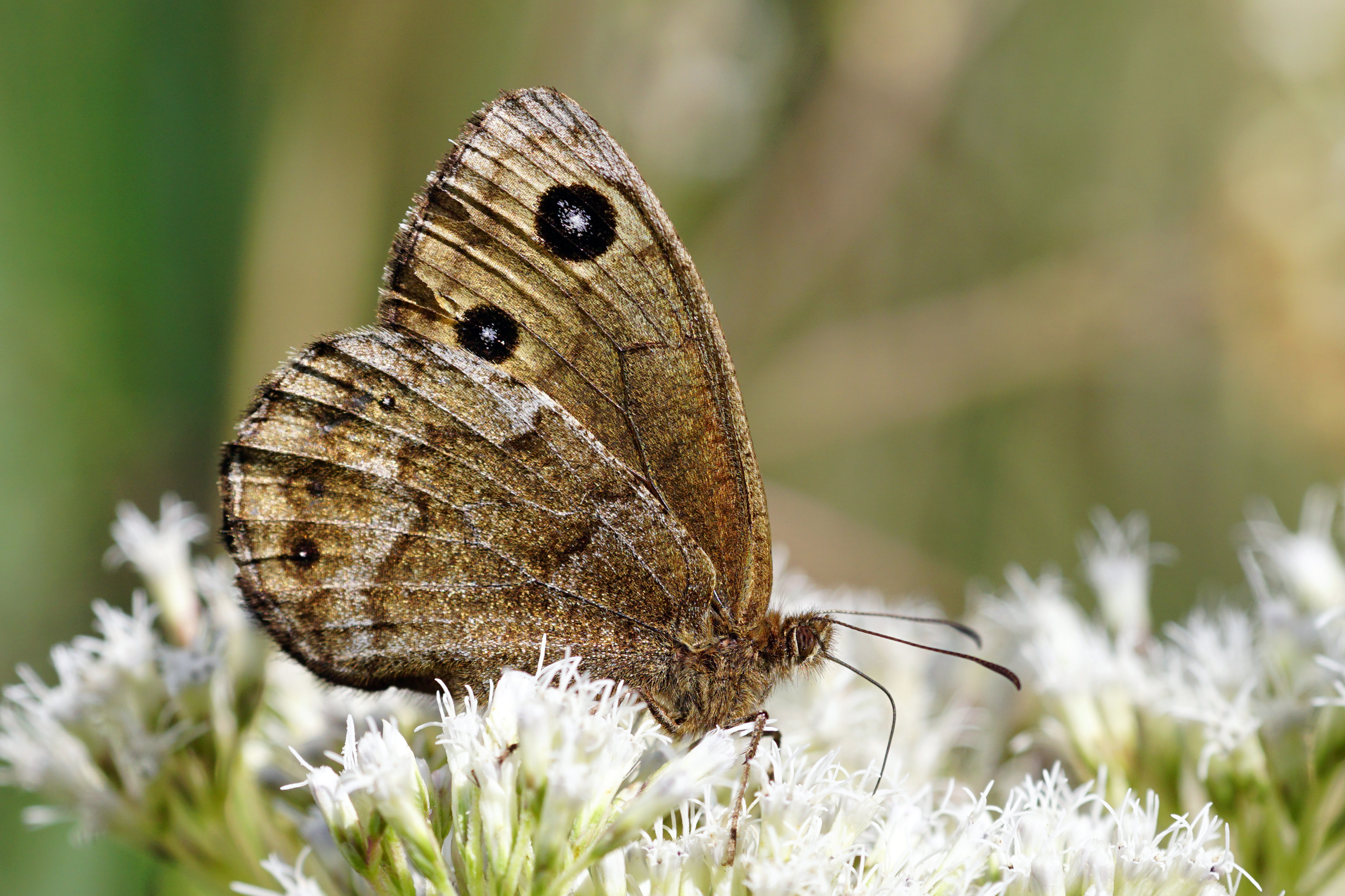
- Underside

Scientific classification
- Kingdom: Animalia
- Phylum: Arthropoda
- Clade: Pancrustacea
- Class: Insecta
- Order: Lepidoptera
- Family: Nymphalidae
- Genus: Minois
- Species: M. nagasawae

Binomial name
- Minois nagasawae Matsumura, 1906

= Minois nagasawae =

Species of butterfly

Minois nagasawae, also known as the Nagasawa snake-eyed butterfly, is a species of butterfly in the family Nymphalidae.

== Distribution ==
This species is endemic to Taiwan, and can be found at high altitudes in the mountains above 2500m on the main island of Taiwan, making it the butterfly species with the highest altitude habitat in Taiwan.

== Ecology ==
The larvae of this species feed on the grass species Brachypodium kawakamii and Deschampsia caespitosa.
