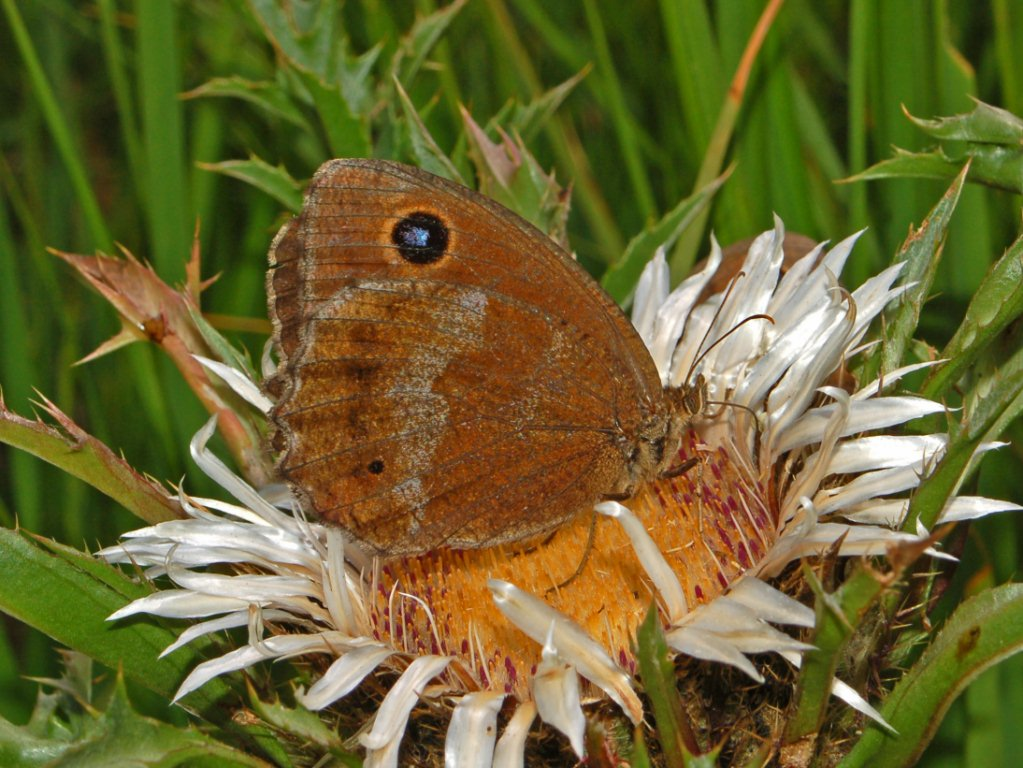
- Minois dryas

Scientific classification
- Kingdom: Animalia
- Phylum: Arthropoda
- Clade: Pancrustacea
- Class: Insecta
- Order: Lepidoptera
- Family: Nymphalidae
- Subtribe: Satyrina
- Genus: Minois; Hübner, 1819

= Minois =

Genus of butterflies

Minois is a genus of butterflies of the family Nymphalidae.

== Species ==
- Minois aurata (Oberthür, 1909)
- Minois dryas (Scopoli, 1763)
- Minois nagasawae (Matsumura, 1906)
- Minois paupera (Alphéraky, 1888)
