= Dryas =

Dryas may refer to:

== Biology ==
- Dryas (plant), a genus of plants
- Dryas, a monotypic genus of butterflies containing the single species Dryas iulia
- Dryas monkey (Cercopithecus dryas), a little-known species of guenon found only in the Congo Basin

== Geology ==
- Dryas, the name of several climatic periods, named for their abundant dryas flowers:
  - Oldest Dryas
  - Older Dryas
  - Middle Dryas
  - Younger Dryas

== Other uses ==
- Dryas (mythology), several characters in Greek mythology
- Drias, Kavala, or Dryas, a village in Greece

== See also ==
- Dryad (disambiguation)
