= HMS Dryad =

Eight ships of the Royal Navy have been named HMS Dryad, after the tree nymphs of Greek mythology.

- HMS Dryad (1795) was a 36-gun fifth rate launched in 1795, sent to harbour service in 1832, and broken up in 1860.
- HMS Dryad was a screw frigate laid down in 1860 but cancelled in 1864.
- HMS Dryad (1866) was a wooden screw sloop launched in 1866 and broken up twenty years later.
- HMS Dryad (1893) was a Dryad-class torpedo gunboat launched in 1893 and renamed HMS Hamadryad in 1918 before being sold for scrapping in 1920.
- HMS Dryad was planned to be a light cruiser that was ordered in 1918. However, she was cancelled later that year before she had been launched.
- Three navigation schoolships have been temporarily renamed Dryad:
  - HMS Drudge was renamed HMS Dryad from 26 January 1919 until later in the same year.
  - HMS Rattler was renamed HMS Dryad between September 1919 and 1924.
  - HMS Carstairs was renamed HMS Dryad from 4 January 1924 until 15 August 1924.
- The last HMS Dryad (shore establishment) was a stone frigate and home to the Royal Navy's Maritime Warfare School.
