= Dryades =

Scientific classification
- Kingdom: Plantae
- Clade: Tracheophytes
- Clade: Angiosperms
- Clade: Eudicots
- Clade: Rosids
- Order: Sapindales
- Family: Rutaceae
- Genus: Dryades; Groppo, Kallunki & Pirani (2020)

Species
- Dryades concinna (Kallunki) Groppo & Kallunki; Dryades cyrtantha (Kallunki) Groppo & Kallunki; Dryades gaudichaudiana (A.St.-Hil.) Groppo, Kallunki & Pirani; Dryades hirsuta (Pirani) Groppo & Pirani; Dryades insignis (Pirani) Groppo & Pirani

Genus of flowering plants

Dryades is a genus of flowering plants in family Rutaceae. It includes five species native to eastern and southern Brazil.

== Species ==
Five species are currently accepted:

- Dryades concinna (Kallunki) Groppo & Kallunki – eastern Brazil (southeastern Bahia)
- Dryades cyrtantha (Kallunki) Groppo & Kallunki – eastern and southeastern Brazil (Bahia and Espírito Santo)
- Dryades gaudichaudiana (A.St.-Hil.) Groppo, Kallunki & Pirani – northeastern, southeastern, and southern Brazil
- Dryades hirsuta (Pirani) Groppo & Pirani – eastern Brazil (southeastern Bahia)
- Dryades insignis (Pirani) Groppo & Pirani – eastern and southeastern Brazil (Bahia and Espírito Santo)
