= Pierre-Gustave Roze =

French admiral (1812–1883)

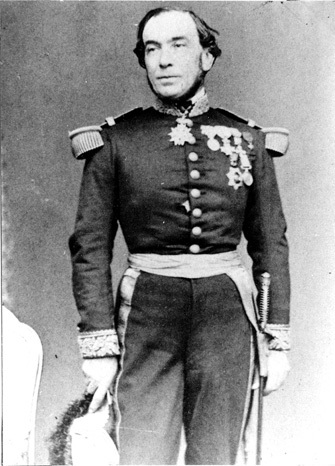
- Portrait of Admiral Roze
- Born: 28 November 1812; Toulon
- Died: 1883 (aged 70–71); Paris
- Military career
- Allegiance: France
- Branch: French navy
- Rank: Vice-Admiral

Pierre-Gustave Roze (28 November 1812 – November 1883) was a French admiral. He was born in Toulon, France, and throughout his adult life served as a career naval officer. As a young rear admiral (contre-amiral) he served in Mexico during the French intervention there in 1862. In 1865, he was appointed commander of the French Far Eastern Station (Station des mers de Chine). As commander, he was primarily stationed in Yokohama, the headquarters of the French Far Eastern Squadron, though he was involved in naval operations in nearby Korea and French Indochina in 1866. He won most recognition during the French Campaign against Korea in 1866, an offensive involving the French Far Eastern Squadron as well as French marines that proved a failed attempt to force reparations from the Korean court for its persecution of French and native Catholics.

After the Korean expedition Roze and his fleet returned to Japan, where they were able to welcome the first French military mission to Japan (1867–1868) in Yokohama harbor on January 13, 1867. Roze was recalled to France in 1868. He was named vice admiral in 1869 and served on the Admiralty Council (Conseil d'amirauté). He was named Préfet Maritime de la Manche et de la Mer du Nord, a position he held between 1869 and 1871 and during which he served to guard the Brittany coast during the Franco-Prussian War. In 1875, Roze was named commander of the Mediterranean Squadron (Escadre de la Méditerranée).

Roze died in Paris in 1883.

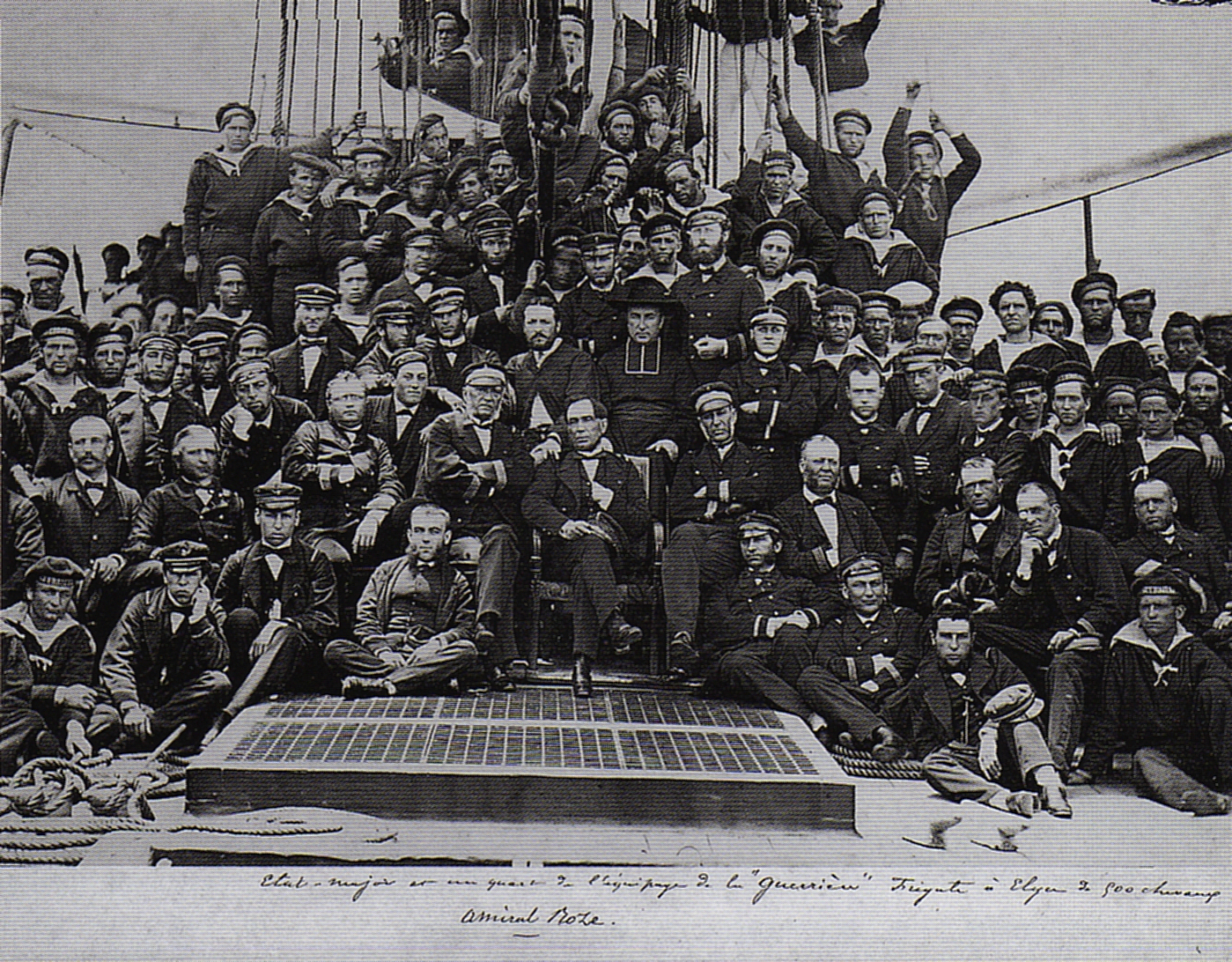
Admiral Roze (centre) and a quarter of his sailors, on the frigate Guerrière. Circa 1865 photograph, during a visit in Nagasaki harbour.

Sketch of Admiral Roze, ca. 1870.

== See also ==
- French campaign against Korea, 1866
