= French frigate Dryade (1783) =

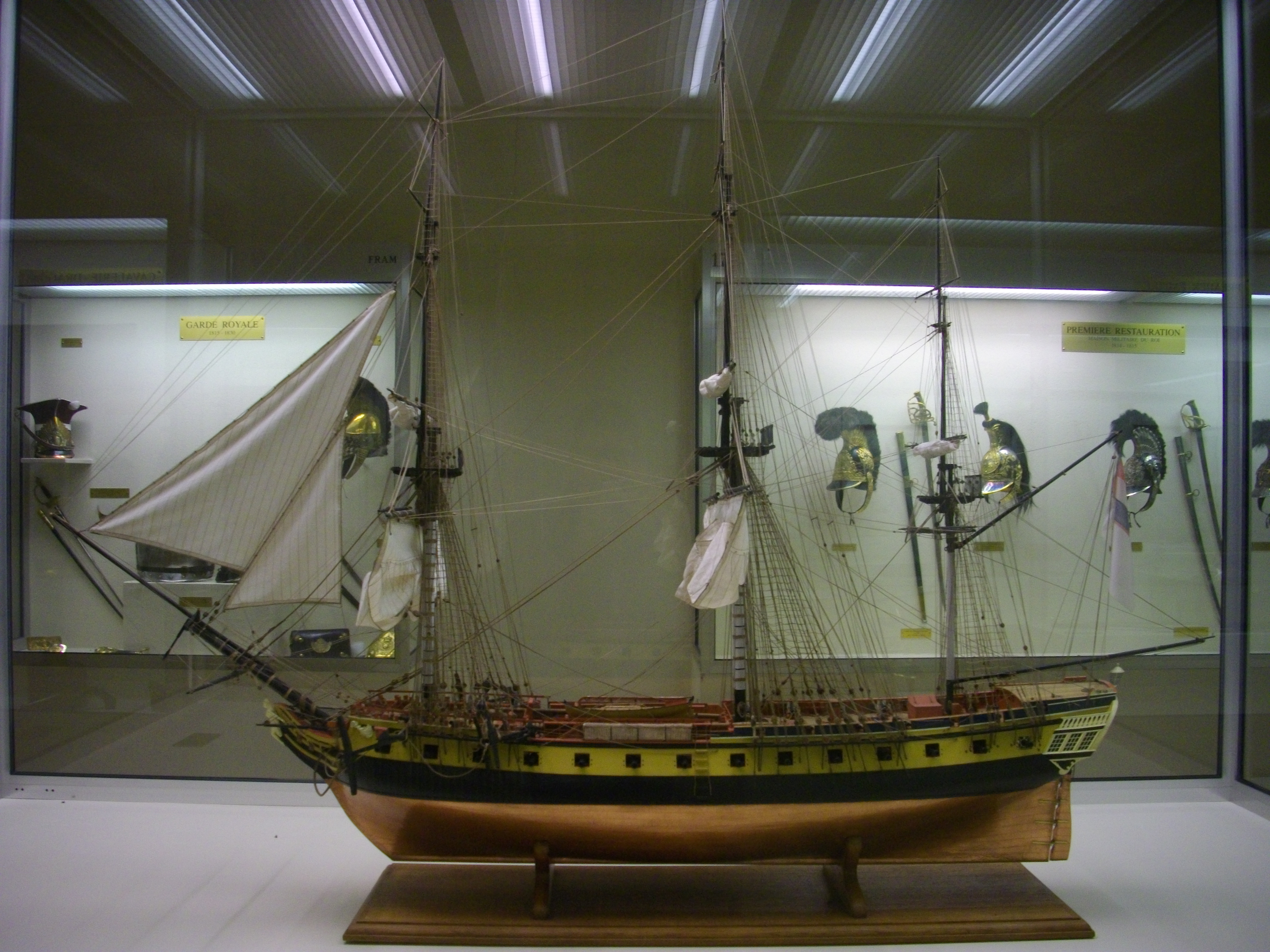
- Model of Dryade at the Musée Saint-Remi

History

France
- Name: Dryade
- Namesake: Dryad
- Builder: Saint Malo
- Laid down: 1782
- Launched: 3 February 1783
- Commissioned: April 1783
- Stricken: 1796
- Fate: Scrapped 1801

General characteristics
- Class & type: Hébé-class frigate
- Displacement: 1,350 tonneaux
- Tons burthen: 700 port tonneaux
- Length: 46.3 m (152 ft)
- Beam: 11.9 m (39 ft)
- Draught: 5.5 m (18 ft)
- Complement: 350
- Armament: 26 x long 18-pounder; 10 x long 8-pounders; 4 x caronades

Dryade (Note: The name is sometimes written Driade, which is an older orthography. See for details.) was a 38-gun Hébé-class frigate of the French Navy.

In December 1787, Vénus formed a frigate division under Guy Pierre de Kersaint, along with Méduse, and sailed to Cochinchina to ferry Pigneau de Behaine, Ambassador of France.

In 1794, Dryade was at Brest under Ensign Meynene. The next year, under Lieutenant Lafargue, she cruised off Bretagne.

From 1796, she was used as a hulk in Brest harbour, and was eventually scrapped in 1801.

A model of Dryade is on display at the Abbey of Saint-Remi.
