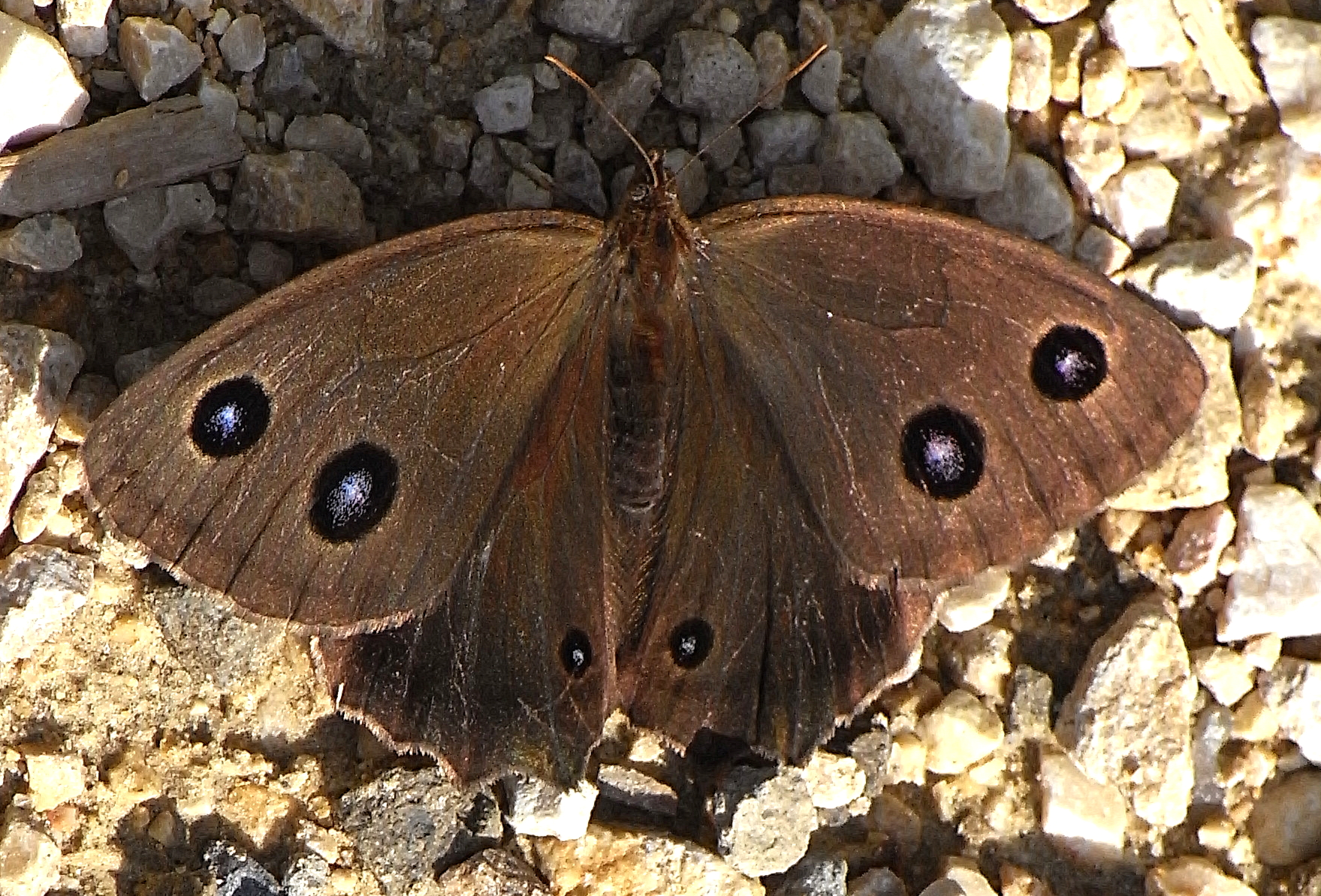
- Upperside
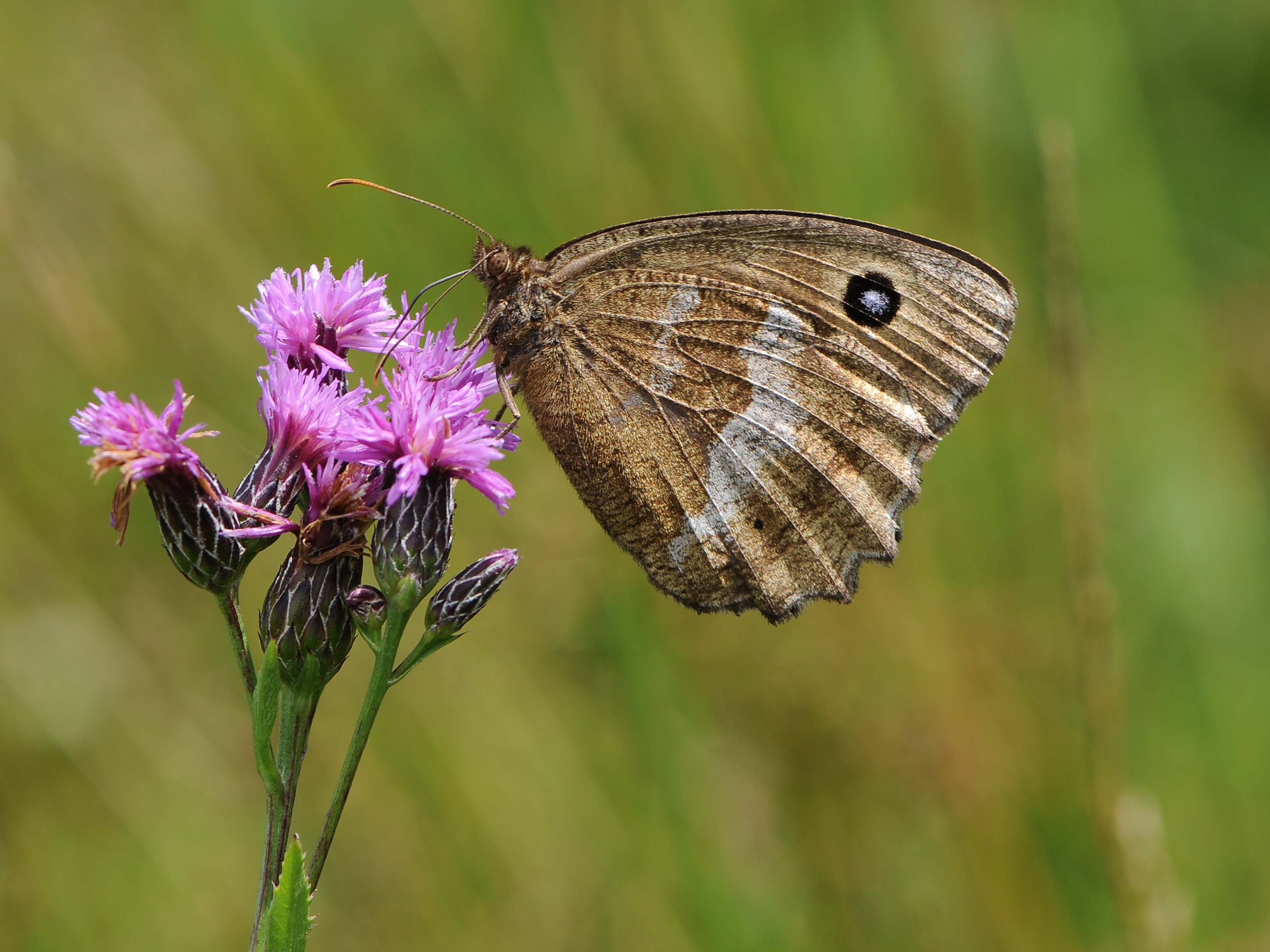
- Underside

Scientific classification
- Kingdom: Animalia
- Phylum: Arthropoda
- Class: Insecta
- Order: Lepidoptera
- Family: Nymphalidae
- Genus: Minois
- Species: M. dryas

Binomial name
- Minois dryas (Scopoli, 1763)

= Minois dryas =

Species of butterfly

Minois dryas, the dryad, is a butterfly of the family Nymphalidae.

== Subspecies ==
Subspecies include:

- Minois dryas phaedra (Linnaeus, 1764) (southern Alps)
- Minois dryas bipunctatus (Motschulsky, 1861) (Eastern Asia and Japan)
- Minois dryas septentrionalis (Wnukowsky, 1929)
- Minois dryas shaanxiensis (Qian)

== Distribution and habitat ==
This species can be found in southern and central Europe up to central Asia and Japan. It prefers margins of mixed woodland and sunny grasslands with plenty of flowers, at an elevation of 100–1,600 metres (330–5,250 ft) above sea level.

== Description ==
The wingspan is 54–70 millimetres (2.1–2.8 in). The basic color of the upperside of the wings is dark brown. The females are larger and paler than the males. On each forewing there are two large eyelets with bluish pupils, while in each hindwing there is just a small eyelet. The underside of the wings is quite similar, but the eyelets on the forewings show a yellowish border and the hindwings are mainly gray brown.

This species is rather similar to Satyrus actaea and Satyrus ferula. In the last one the forewing eyespots centered with white.

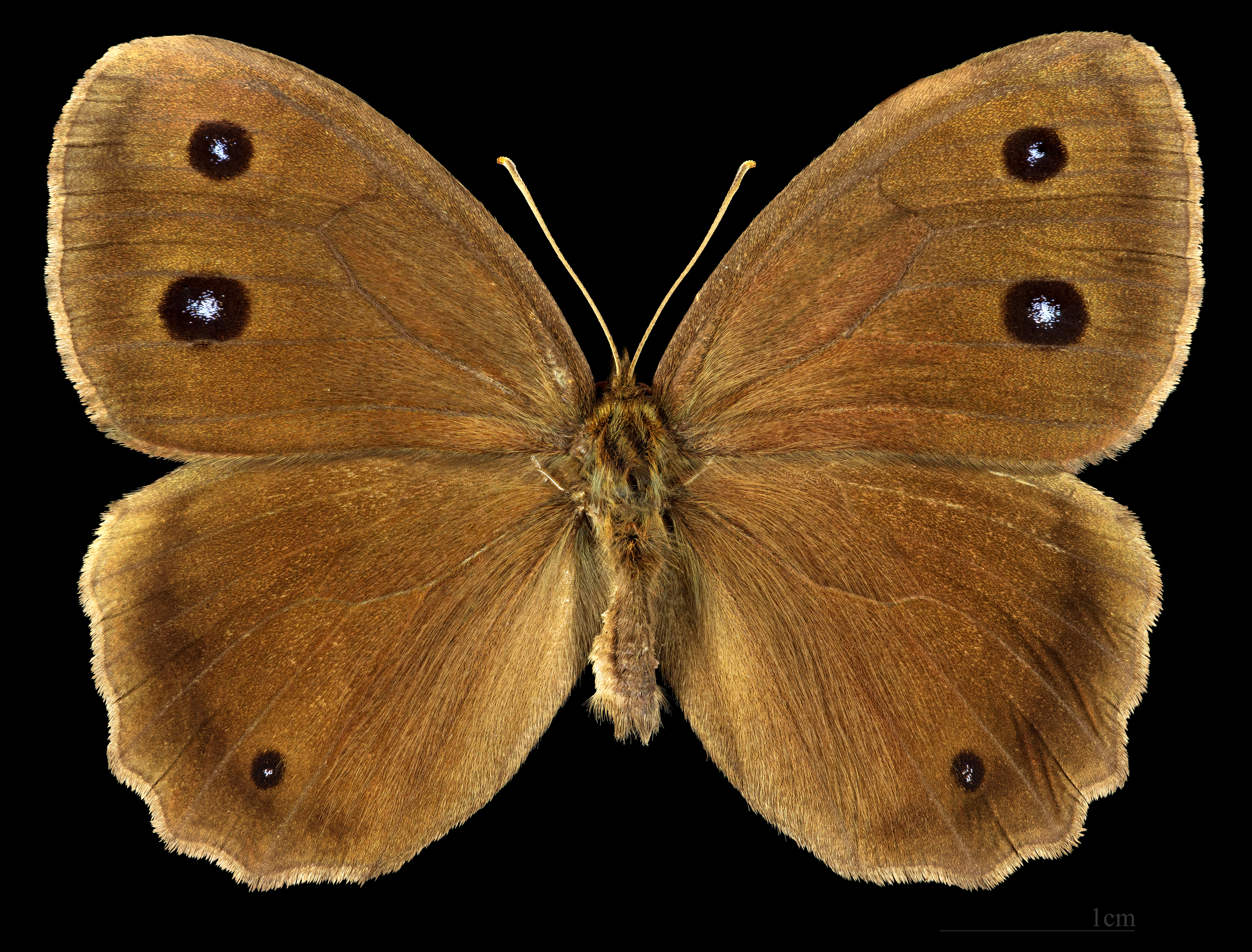
Minois dryas ♂

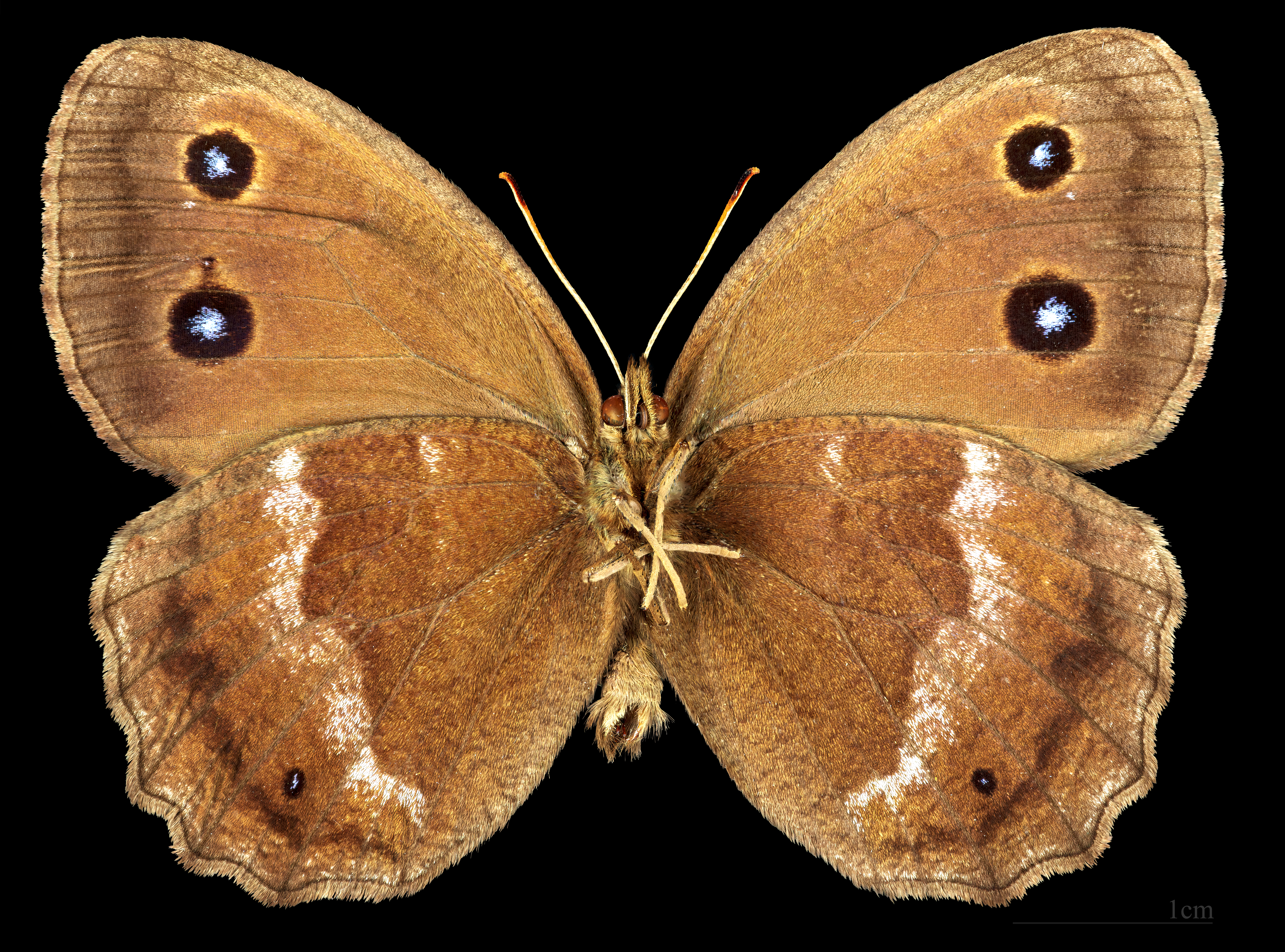
Minois dryas ♂ △
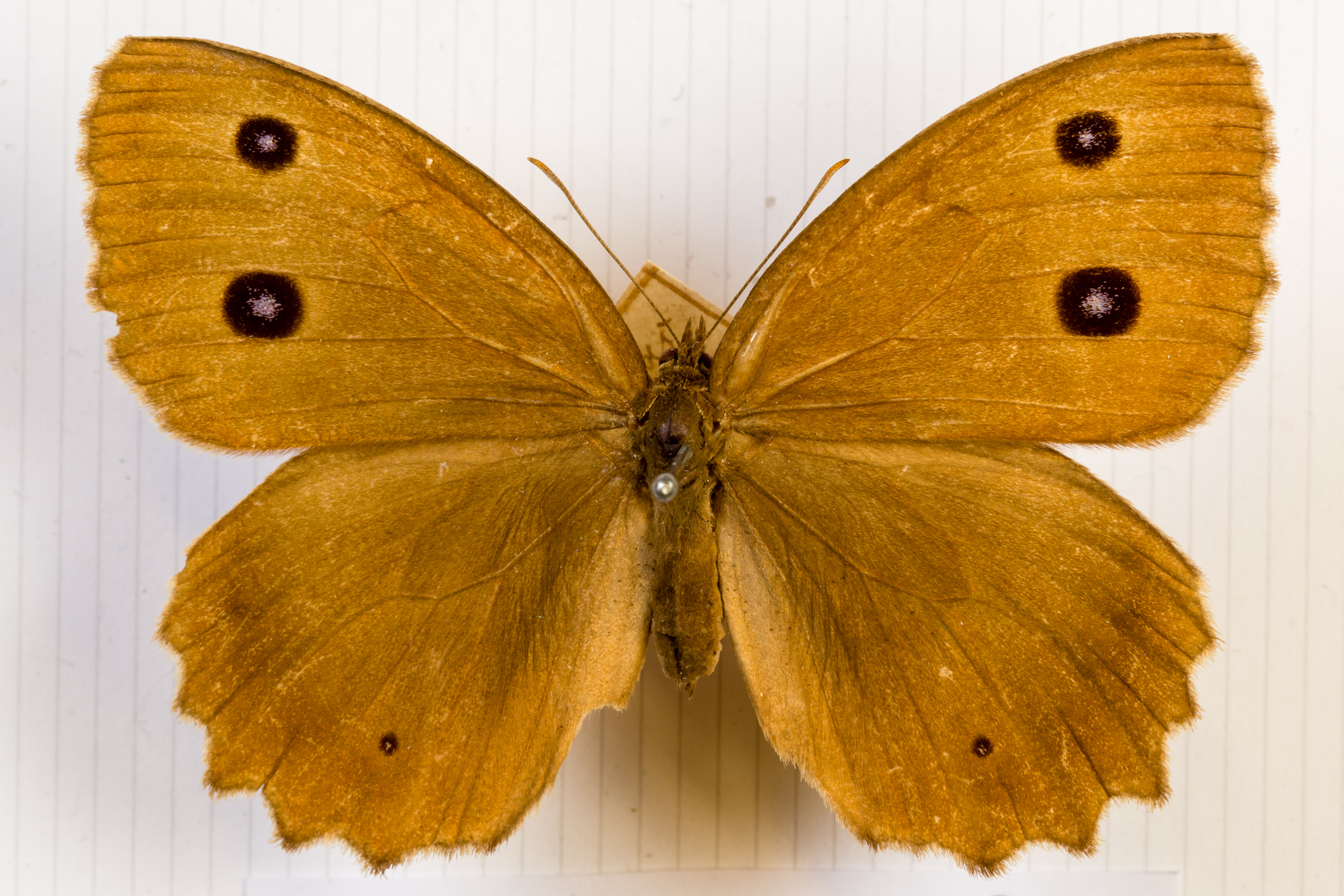
Female

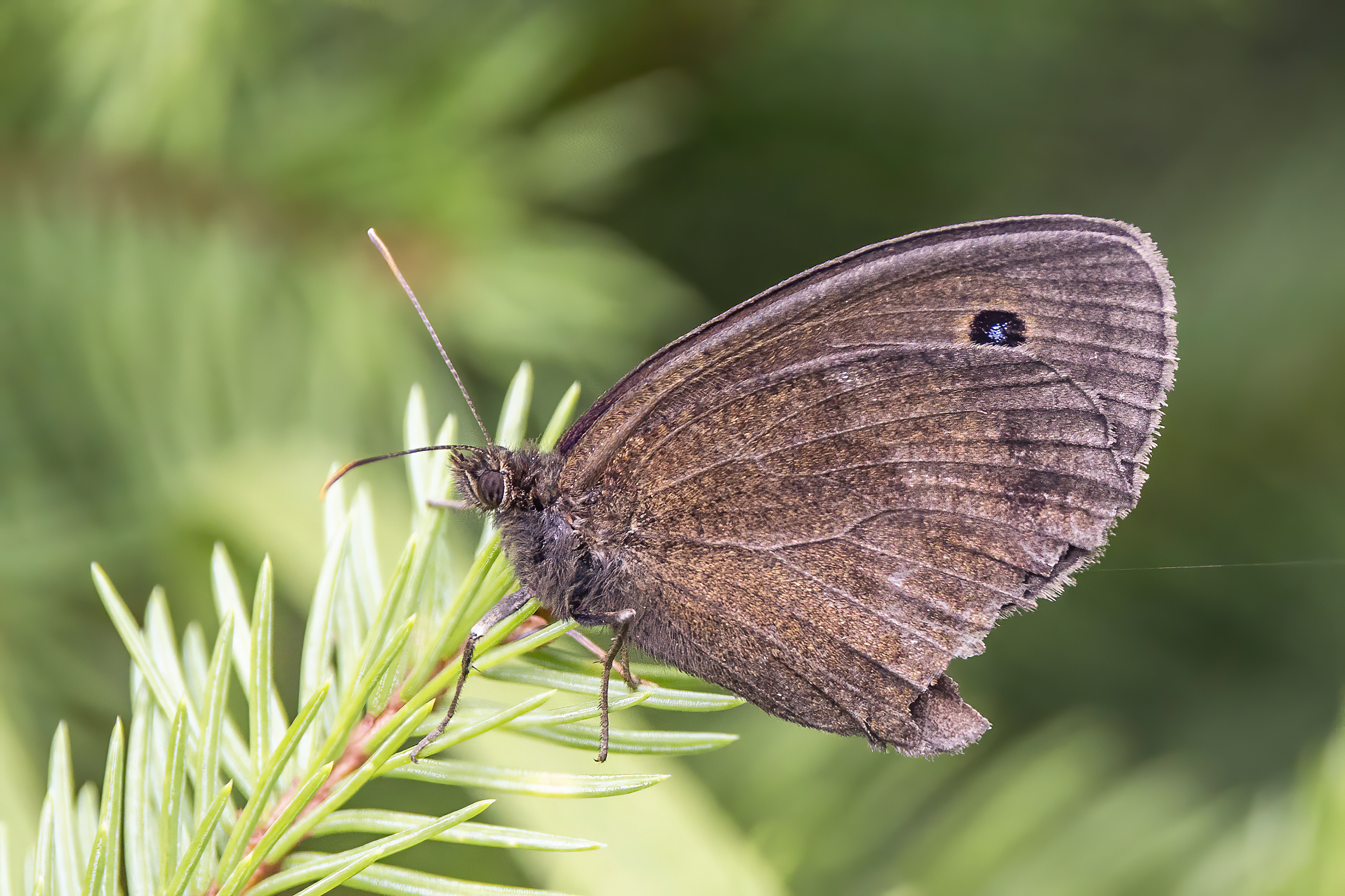
Male underside

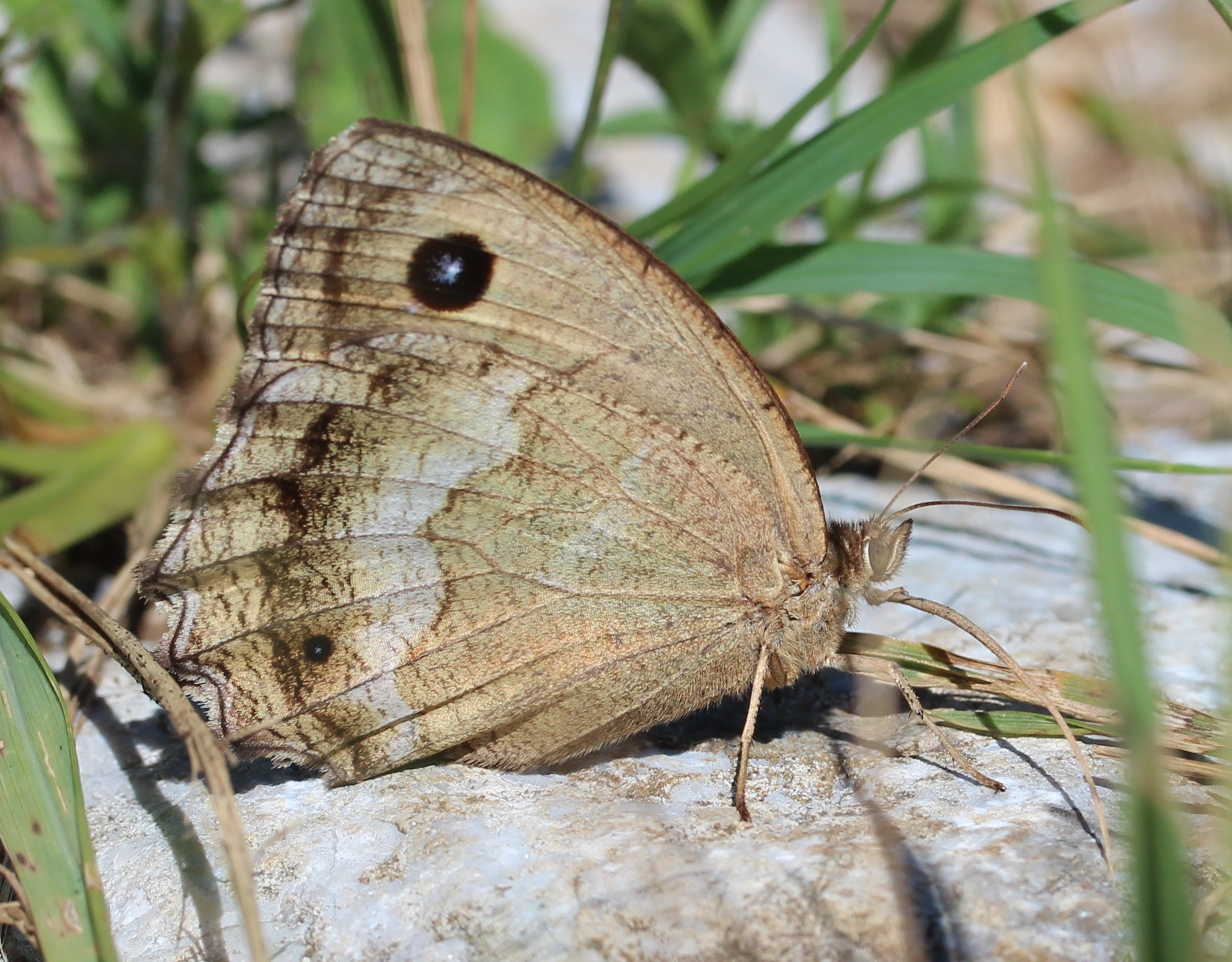
Female underside

== Biology ==
The butterfly is on wing from June to September depending on the location. They usually feed on nectar of scabious (Scabiosa species), hemp agrimony (Eupatorium cannabinum) and other tall flowers. The larvae feed on grass species, such as Molinia caerulea, Arrhenatherum elatius, Oryza sativa, Avena, Dactylis, Poa, Festuca, Carex, Calamagrostis and Bromus species.
