= French frigate Didon (1828) =

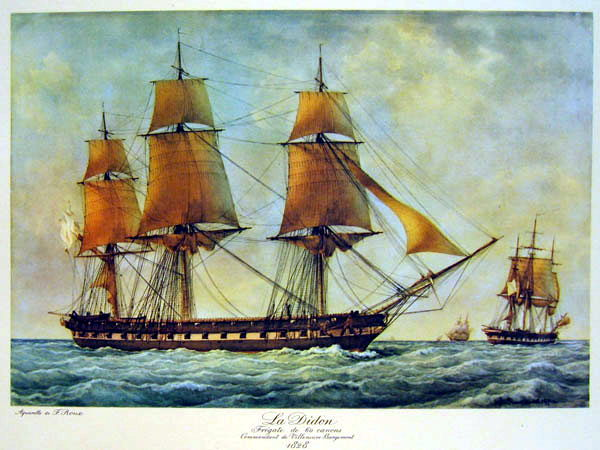
- Portrait of Didon by François Roux

History

France
- Name: Didon
- Namesake: Dido
- Builder: Toulon
- Laid down: March 1825
- Launched: 15 July 1828
- Stricken: 28 March 1867
- Fate: Broken up 1867

General characteristics
- Class & type: Dryade-class frigate
- Sail plan: Full-rigged ship
- Armament: 60 30-pounders

The Didon was a 60-gun Dryade-class first rank frigate of the French Navy.

== Career ==
Didon took part in the Invasion of Algiers in 1830, and in the Battle of the Tagus the next year.

Didon ran aground on the south coast of Saint Croix on 25 May 1836 and lost her rudder. Although refloated, she ran aground a second time before being taken in to Frederickstadt. She later took part in the Crimean War as a troopship.
