= Dryade-class frigate =

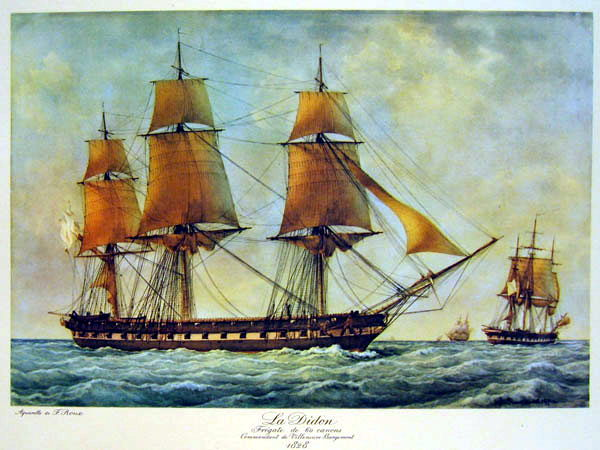
- Portrait of Didon by François Roux

Class overview
- Name: Dryade
- Builders: Toulon, Rochefort, Brest
- Operators: French Navy
- Preceded by: Surveillante class
- Succeeded by: Uranie; Persévérante; Vengeance class
- Completed: 9

General characteristics
Type	Frigate
Displacement	2,500 tonnes
Length	77 m (252 ft 7 in)
Beam	14.50 m (47 ft 7 in)
Propulsion	sail
Troops	291 if fitted as a troop ship
Complement	500 (212 if fitted as a troop ship)
Armament	60 guns; 32 30-pounder guns; 28 30-pounder carronades; 2 18-pounder guns

The Dryade class was a type of 60-gun frigate of the French Navy, designed in 1823 by Paul-Marie Leroux.

== Ships ==
- Dryade

Builder: Rochefort
Begun:
Launched: 12 July 1828
Completed:
Fate: deleted 9 May 1838.

- Didon

Builder: Toulon
Begun:
Launched: 15 July 1828
Completed:
Fate: deleted 28 March 1867.

- Renommée

Builder: Rochefort
Begun:
Launched: 28 July 1847
Completed:
Fate: fitted as steam-assisted frigate 1858 – deleted 15 November 1878.

- Guerrière

Builder: Brest
Begun:
Launched: 3 May 1860
Completed:
Fate: deleted 28 May 1888.

- Sémiramis

Builder: Rochefort
Begun:
Launched: 8 August 1861
Completed:
Fate: deleted 3 May 1877.
