= List of Catholic saints =

This is an incomplete list of humans and angels whom the Catholic Church has canonized as saints. Catholic theology holds that all saints enjoy the beatific vision. Many appear in the General Roman Calendar; others are recorded in the Roman Martyrology; and still others belong to particular local churches or religious institutes, with recognition that does not extend to the universal church. The Catholic Church's canonization process moves through four successive stages. The first two, Servant of God and Venerable, are investigative stages in which a candidate's life and virtues are examined; the latter two, Blessed and Saint, represent formal proclamation by the church. A candidate may be advanced to Servant of God by a local bishop, while all further stages require a papal declaration. At each stage, those recognized are typically grouped by nationality, by religious order, or as popes.

Categories of a beatification process
Candidates		Proclaimed	
Servants of God	Venerables	Blesseds	Saints
by nationality	by nationality	by nationality	by nationality
by religious order	by religious order	by religious order	by religious order
proclaimed by local bishop	by pope proclaimer	by pope proclaimer	by pope proclaimer
popes	popes	popes	popes

Some individuals venerated as saints in the Eastern Orthodox Church and other Christian traditions are listed separately in Category:Christian saints by century and Category:Christian saints by nationality.

== Catholic Saints ==
Saint	Date of birth	Date of death	Date of canonization	Notes
Aaron of Aleth	unknown	after 552		Hermit
Abachum	200s	270	found in Roman Martyrology	
Abadiu of Antinoe	300s	300s		
Abamun of Tarnut	300s	372		Martyr
Abanoub	300s	300s		Coptic child martyr
Abanoub Ayad Attia	22 July 1991	15 February 2015	found in Roman Martyrology (added on 11 May 2023 by Pope Francis)	Coptic Orthodox, one of the 21 Coptic Christian Martyrs of Libya
Abbán	unknown	c. 520		
Abo of Tiflis	unknown	6 January 786		Martyr
Abbo of Fleury	945	13 November 1004		Assisted Archbishop of Oswald
Abdas of Susa	300s	420		
Abdel Moati Massabki	1800s	10 July 1860	20 October 2024 by Pope Francis	
Abdon	100s	c. 250	found in Roman Martyrology	
Abel of Reims	unknown	c. 751		
Abercius of Hieropolis	unknown	c. 167	found in Roman Martyrology	
Aberoh and Atom	unknown	unknown		Brothers
Abhor and Mehraela	unknown	unknown		Brother and sister
Abibus of Edessa	307	322		
Abra of Poitiers	12 December 339	c. 360		
Abraham Kidunaia	unknown	c. 360		
Abraham of Arbela	unknown	345		
Abraham of Clermont	unknown	c. 479		
Abraham of Cratia	c. 474	c. 558		
Abraham of Cyrrhus	c. 350	422		
Abraham of Rostov	900s	1045–1074		
Abraham of Smolensk	1150 or 1172	c. 1222	1549 by Pope Paul III	
Abran	500s	500s		
Abrosima	200s	341		
Absadah	200s	c. 300		
Abudimus	200s	305	found in Roman Martyrology	
Abundius	400s	469	found in Roman Martyrology	
Abundius of Córdoba	unknown	11 July 854	found in Roman Martyrology	One of the Martyrs of Córdoba
Acca of Hexham	c. 660	c. 742		
Aceolus and Acius	unknown	c. 290		
Acepsimas of Hnaita	unknown	10 October 376	found in Roman Martyrology	
Acestes	unknown	c. 65		One of the soldiers who led Paul the Apostle to his death
Achillas of Alexandria	unknown	June 313		Patriarch of Alexandria
Achilleus	0s	c. 100 AD	found in Roman Martyrology	
Achilleus Kewanuka	1869	3 June 1886	18 October 1964 by Pope Paul VI	One of the Uganda Martyrs
Achillius of Larissa	200s	330		
Acisclus	200s	304		
Adalard of Corbie	751	2 January 827	1026 by Pope John XIX	
Adalbard	600s	652		
Adalbero II of Metz	c. 958	14 December 1005		
Adalbero of Würzburg	c. 1010	6 October 1090	5 July 1883 (cultus confirmed) by Pope Leo XIII	
Adalbert of Magdeburg	c. 910	20 June 981		Archbishop of Magdeburg
Adalbert of Prague	956	23 April 997	3 February 999 by Pope Sylvester II	His skull is preserved and kept in the St. Vitus cathedral
Adalgar	900s	9 May 909		Archbishop of Bremen
Adalgott II of Disentis	1100s	1165		Bishop of Chur
Adamo Abate	c. 990	3 May 1060–1070		Professed religious of the Benedictines
Adauctus	200s	303		Martyred with Felix
Adela of Normandy	c. 1067	8 March 1137		Daughter of William the Conqueror
Adela of Pfalzel	unknown	735		Sister of Irmina of Oeren
Adelaide of Italy	931	16 December 999	1097 by Pope Urban II	Married layperson of the Archdiocese of Burgundy, queen of Italy and Burgundy, empress
Adelaide, Abbess of Vilich	c. 970	5 February 1015		Professed religious of the Benedictine nuns
Adelelmus of Burgos	1000s	1100		
Adeloga of Kitzingen	unknown	c. 745		
Adheritus	100s	unknown		
Adjutor	24 June 1073	30 April 1131		
Adolf of Osnabrück	c. 1185	30 June 1222 or 1224	1625 by Pope Urban VIII	
Adolphus Ludigo-Mkasa	c. 1861	3 June 1886	18 October 1964 by Pope Paul VI	One of the Uganda Martyrs
Adomnán	c. 624	704	11 July 1898 (equipollent) by Pope Leo XIII	
Adrian and Natalia of Nicomedia	200s	4 March 306		Husband and wife
Adrian of Canterbury	c. 630	c. 710		
Adrian van Hilvarenbeek	1528	9 July 1572	29 June 1867 by Pope Pius IX	One of the Martyrs of Gorkum
Adulf	unknown	c. 680		
Aedesius of Alexandria	200s	8 April 306	found in Roman Martyrology	
Ælfheah of Canterbury	c. 953	19 April 1012	1078 by Pope Gregory VII	Archbishop of Canterbury, Bishop of Winchester
Ælfwold II	unknown	1058		Bishop of Sherborne
Aelred of Rievaulx	1110	12 January 1167		
Afan	unknown	500s		
Afra	291	304	found in Roman Martyrology	Virgin, martyr
Africus	600s	600s		
Agabus	unknown	unknown		
Agapitus	unknown	6 August 258	found in Roman Martyrology	
Agapius, Atticus, Carterius, Styriacus, Tobias, Eudoxius, Nictopolion, and companions	unknown	315		
Agatha of Sicily	c. 231	c. 251	found in Roman Martyrology	
Agatha Chon Kyonghyob	1790	26 September 1839	6 May 1984 by Pope John Paul II	One of the Korean Martyrs
Agatha Kim Agi	1787	24 May 1839	6 May 1984 by Pope John Paul II	One of the Korean Martyrs
Agatha Kwon Chin-i	1820	31 January 1840	6 May 1984 by Pope John Paul II	One of the Korean Martyrs
Agatha Lin	c. 1817	28 January 1858	1 October 2000 by Pope John Paul II	One of the Martyr Saints of China
Agatha Yi	1824	9 January 1840	6 May 1984 by Pope John Paul II	One of the Korean Martyrs
Agatha Yi Kannan	1814	20 September 1846	6 May 1984 by Pope John Paul II	One of the Korean Martyrs
Agatha Yi Kyong-i	1814	31 January 1840	6 May 1984 by Pope John Paul II	One of the Korean Martyrs
Agatha Yi Sosa	1784	24 May 1839	6 May 1984 by Pope John Paul II	One of the Korean Martyrs
Agathangelus of Rome	200s	c. 312	found in Roman Martyrology	
Agathius	200s	c. 303	found in Roman Martyrology	
Agathoclia	unknown	c. 230		
Agathon of Scetis	300s	c. 435		
Agathonicus	200s	200s		
Agathopodes	unknown	150	found in Roman Martyrology	
Agilbert	600s	600s		
Agilberta	unknown	680		
Agilulfus of Cologne	unknown	c. 750		
Agilus	c. 580	c. 650		
Agnes Kim Hyochu	1816	3 September 1839	6 May 1984 by Pope John Paul II	One of the Korean Martyrs
Agnes Lê Thị Thành	c. 1781	12 July 1841	19 June 1988 by Pope John Paul II	One of the Vietnamese Martyrs
Agnes of Assisi	1197 or 1198	16 November 1253	6 November 1753 (cultus confirmed) by Pope Benedict XIV	Younger sister of St. Clare of Assisi
Agnes of Bohemia	20 June 1211	2 March 1282	12 November 1989 by Pope John Paul II	
Agnes of Montepulciano	28 January 1268	20 April 1317	10 December 1726 by Pope Benedict XIII	
Agnes of Poitiers	unknown	586		
Agnes of Rome	unknown	304	found in Roman Martyrology	Virgin, martyr
Agnes Tsao Kou Ying	1821	1 March 1856	1 October 2000 by Pope John Paul II	One of the Martyr Saints of China
Agobard	c. 769	840		
Agostina Livia Pietrantoni	27 March 1864	13 November 1894	18 April 1999 by Pope John Paul II	She was killed by a patient she was taking care of
Agostino Roscelli	27 July 1818	7 May 1902	10 June 2001 by Pope John Paul II	
Agricius of Trier	c. 260	329, 333 or 335	found in Roman Martyrology	
Agricola	200s	c. 304	found in Roman Martyrology	
Agricola of Avignon	c. 630	c. 700		
Agrippina of Mineo	200s	262		
Agrippinus of Naples	200s	200s		
Agustín Caloca Cortés	5 May 1898	25 May 1927	21 May 2000 by Pope John Paul II	One of the Saints of the Cristero War
Aibert	1060	0407		
Aichardus	600s	687		
Aidan of Lindisfarne	c. 590	31 August 651		
Aignan of Orleans	c. 358	453		
Ailbe of Emly	400s	528		
Aileran	unknown	29 December 664 or 665		
Aimo	unknown	1173		
Alban	unknown	22 June 209, 251, or 304	found in Roman Martyrology	
Alban of Mainz	300s	400s		
Alban Roe	20 July 1583	21 January 1642	25 October 1970 by Pope Paul VI	One of the Forty Martyrs of England and Wales
Alberic Crescitelli	30 June 1863	21 July 1900	1 October 2000 by Pope John Paul II	One of the Martyr Saints of China
Alberic of Cîteaux	1000s	26 January 1109	found in Roman Martyrology	
Alberic of Utrecht	unknown	21 August 784		
Albert Chmielowski	20 August 1845	25 December 1916	12 November 1989 by Pope John Paul II	
Albert of Genoa	c. 1095	8 July 1180	found in the liturgical calendar of the Diocese of Rimini	
Albert of Louvain	c. 1166	24 November 1192	9 August 1613 by Pope Paul V	Murdered by three German knights shortly after becoming Bishop of Liège and regarded as a martyr afterwards.
Albert of Montecorvino	1000s	1127	found in Roman Martyrology	
Albert of Trapani	c. 1240	7 August 1307	31 May 1476 by Pope Sixtus IV	
Albert of Vercelli	1100s	14 September 1214	found in Roman Martyrology	Also known as Albert of Jerusalem
Alberto Hurtado Cruchaga	22 January 1901	18 August 1952	23 October 2005 by Pope Benedict XVI	
Albertus Magnus	before 1200	15 November 1280	16 December 1931 by Pope Pius XI	
Albinus of Angers	c. 470	550		Invoked against pirate attacks
Alchmund of Hexham	unknown	7 September 780 or 781		
Alcuin	c. 735	19 May 804		Played an important role in the development of the Carolingian minuscule
Aldebrandus	1119	30 April 1219	found in the liturgical calendar of the Diocese of Rimini	Bishop of Fossombrone
Aldegund	639	684		
Aldhelm	c. 639	25 May 709		
Alena	600s	c. 640		
Alexander	100s	177	found in Roman Martyrology	
Alexander I of Alexandria	200s	26 February or 17 April 326 or 328		Pope of Alexandria
Alexander Briant	17 August 1556	1 December 1581	25 October 1970 by Pope Paul VI	One of the Forty Martyrs of England and Wales
Alexander of Comana	unknown	c. 250		
Alexander of Constantinople	237–245	337	found in Roman Martyrology	Archbishop of Constantinople
Alexander of Jerusalem	100s	251	found in Roman Martyrology	
Alexander Sauli	15 February 1534	11 October 1592	11 December 1904 by Pope Pius X	
Alexis Falconieri	1200s	17 February 1310	15 January 1888 by Pope Leo XIII	One of the Seven Holy Founders of the Servite Order
Alexis U Seyong	1845	11 March 1866	6 May 1984 by Pope John Paul II	One of the Korean Martyrs
Alexius of Rome	300s	400s	found in Roman Martyrology	
Alferius	930	12 April 1050	21 December 1893 (equipollent) by Pope Leo XIII	
Alfonso Maria Fusco	23 March 1839	6 February 1910	16 October 2016 by Pope Francis	
Alfonso Rodríguez Olmedo	10 March 1598	15 November 1628	16 May 1988 by Pope John Paul II	
Alice of Schaerbeek	c. 1220	11 June 1250	1907 (cultus confirmed) by Pope Pius X	
Alkmund of Derby	c. 770	800		Killed by Eardwulf of Northumbria
Almus	unknown	1270		
Alonso de Orozco Mena	17 October 1500	19 September 1591	19 May 2002 by Pope John Paul II	
Aloysius Gonzaga	9 March 1568	21 June 1591	31 December 1726 by Pope Benedict XIII	
Alphonsa	19 August 1910	28 July 1946	12 October 2008 by Pope Benedict XVI	She was the first woman of Indian origin to be canonised as a saint by the Catholic Church
Alphonsus Liguori	27 September 1696	1 August 1787	26 May 1839 by Pope Gregory XVI	Doctor of Church
Alphonsus Rodriguez	25 July 1532	31 October 1617	15 January 1888 by Pope Leo XIII	
Alto of Altomünster	unknown	c. 760		
Alypius of Thagaste	400s	500s	1584 by Pope Gregory XIII	
Amabilis of Riom	unknown	c. 475		
Amadio degli Amidei	1200s	1266	15 January 1888 by Pope Leo XIII	One of the Seven Holy Founders of the Servite Order
Amalberga of Maubreuge	600s	c. 690		
Amalberga of Temse	c. 741	10 July 772		
Amandina of Schakkebroek	28 December 1872	9 July 1900	1 October 2000 by Pope John Paul II	One of the Martyr Saints of China
Amandus	584	679	1584 by Pope Gregory XIII	
Amantius of Como	300s	8 April 448	found in Roman Martyrology	
Amata of Assisi	1200s	1250		
Amato Ronconi	1225	8 May 1292	23 November 2014 by Pope Francis	
Amator	300s	1 May 418	found in Roman Martyrology	
Amator of Córdoba	unknown	30 April 855	found in Roman Martyrology	One of the Martyrs of Córdoba
Amatus	unknown	627	3 December 1049 by Pope Leo IX	
Ambrose Barlow	1585	10 September 1641	25 October 1970 by Pope Paul VI	One of the Forty Martyrs of England and Wales
Ambrose of Alexandria	100s	c. 250		
Ambrose of Milan	c. 340	4 April 397	found in Roman Martyrology	
Ambrósio Francisco Ferro	unknown	3 October 1645	15 October 2017 by Pope Francis	One of the Martyrs of Natal
Ambrosio Kibuuka	1868	3 June 1886	18 October 1964 by Pope Paul VI	One of the Uganda Martyrs
Ampelus	200s	302	found in Roman Martyrology	
Amphibalus	200s	25 June 304		
Amun	200s	300s		
Amunia of San Millán	unknown	1069		
Ananias of Damascus	unknown	unknown		Disciple of Jesus
Anastasia	0s	68 AD	found in Roman Martyrology	
Anastasia of Sirmium	200s	25 December 304	found in Roman Martyrology	
Anastasia the Patrician	500s	500s		
Anastasius of Antioch	200s	302	found in Roman Martyrology	
Anastasius of Córdoba	unknown	14 June 853	found in Roman Martyrology	One of the Martyrs of Córdoba
Anastasius of Pavia	600s	680	found in Roman Martyrology	
Anastasius of Persia	500s	22 January 628	found in Roman Martyrology	
Anastasius of Suppentonia	500s	570	found in Roman Martyrology	
Anastasius Sinaita	600s	700s	found in Roman Martyrology	
Anastasius the Fuller	200s	304	found in Roman Martyrology	
Anatoli Kiriggwajjo	1800s	3 June 1886	18 October 1964 by Pope Paul VI	One of the Uganda Martyrs
Anatolia	200s	250	found in Roman Martyrology	
Anatolius of Laodicea	200s	3 July 283	found in Roman Martyrology	Invented the first Metonic 19-year lunar cycle in the 270s
André Bauer	26 November 1866	9 July 1900	1 October 2000 by Pope John Paul II	One of the Martyr Saints of China
André Bessette	9 August 1845	6 January 1937	17 October 2010 by Pope Benedict XVI	
André de Soveral	c. 1572	16 July 1645	15 October 2017 by Pope Francis	One of the Martyrs of Natal
André-Hubert Fournet	6 December 1752	13 May 1834	4 June 1933 by Pope Pius XI	Priest of the Diocese of Poitiers; founder of the Sisters of the Cross
Andreas Wang Tianqing	c. 1891	22 July 1900	1 October 2000 by Pope John Paul II	One of the Martyr Saints of China
Andrew Avellino	1521	10 November 1608	22 May 1712 by Pope Clement XI	
Andrew Bobola	1591	16 May 1657	17 April 1938 by Pope Pius XI	Professed priest of the Jesuits; martyr
Andrew Chong Hwagyong	1808	23 January 1840	6 May 1984 by Pope John Paul II	One of the Korean Martyrs
Andrew Corsini	30 November 1302	6 January 1374	22 April 1629 by Pope Urban VIII	
Andrew Dũng-Lạc	1795	21 December 1839	19 June 1988 by Pope John Paul II	One of the Vietnamese Martyrs
Andrew Kaggwa	1856	26 May 1886	18 October 1964 by Pope Paul VI	One of the Uganda Martyrs
Andrew Kim Taegon	21 August 1821	16 September 1846	6 May 1984 by Pope John Paul II	One of the Korean Martyrs
Andrew Nguyễn Kim Thông	c. 1790	15 July 1855	19 June 1988 by Pope John Paul II	One of the Vietnamese Martyrs
Andrew of Crete	c. 650	4 July 712 or 726 or 740		
Andrew of Trier	unknown	c. 235		
Andrew Stratelates	200s	300 AD		
Andrew the Apostle	c. 5 BC	62 AD	found in Roman Martyrology	
Andrew the Scot	800s	c. 877		
Andrew Trần Văn Trông	c. 1808	28 November 1835	19 June 1988 by Pope John Paul II	One of the Vietnamese Martyrs
Andrew Tường	1766	16 June 1862	19 June 1988 by Pope John Paul II	One of the Vietnamese Martyrs
Andrew Wouters	1542	9 July 1572	29 June 1867 by Pope Pius IX	One of the Martyrs of Gorkum
Andrew Zorard	c. 980	c. 1009	July 1083 by Pope Gregory VII	
Andronicus	200s	304		
Angadrisma	600s	c. 695		
Angela Merici	21 March 1474	27 January 1540	24 May 1807 by Pope Pius VII	
Angela of Foligno	1248	3 January 1309	9 October 2013 (equipollent) by Pope Francis	
Angela of the Cross	30 January 1846	2 March 1932	4 May 2003 by Pope John Paul II	Founder of the Institute of the Sisters of the Company of the Cross
Angelelmus	unknown	828		Bishop of Auxerre
Angelo of Castrovillari	unknown	10 October 1227	22 January 1516 by Pope Leo X	One of the seven Franciscan martyrs of Ceuta
Angelus of Jerusalem	1185	5 May 1220	c. 1459 by Pope Pius II	
Angilbert	760	18 February 814	1100 by Pope Urban II	
Anianus of Alexandria	unknown	29 November 83	found in Roman Martyrology	
Aniceto Adolfo	4 October 1912	9 October 1934	21 November 1999 by Pope John Paul II	One of the Martyrs of Turon
Ann An Jiaoshi	c. 1874	11 July 1900	1 October 2000 by Pope John Paul II	One of the Martyr Saints of China
Ann An Xingshi	c. 1828	11 July 1900	1 October 2000 by Pope John Paul II	One of the Martyr Saints of China
Anna Kim Changgum	1789	20 July 1839	6 May 1984 by Pope John Paul II	One of the Korean Martyrs
Anna Maria Rubatto	14 February 1844	6 August 1904	15 May 2022 by Pope Francis	
Anna Pak Agi	1783	24 May 1839	6 May 1984 by Pope John Paul II	One of the Korean Martyrs
Anna Schäffer	18 February 1882	5 October 1925	21 October 2012 by Pope Benedict XVI	
Anna the Prophetess	1st century BC	0s	found in Roman Martyrology	
Anna Wang	c. 1886	22 July 1900	1 October 2000 by Pope John Paul II	One of the Martyr Saints of China
Anne	c. 50 BC	12 AD	found in Roman Martyrology	
Anne Line	c. 1563	27 February 1601	25 October 1970 by Pope Paul VI	One of the Forty Martyrs of England and Wales
Anne-Marie Rivier	19 December 1768	3 February 1838	15 May 2022 by Pope Francis	
Annibale Maria di Francia	5 July 1851	1 June 1927	16 May 2004 by Pope John Paul II	
Anno II	c. 1010	4 December 1075	29 April 1183 by Pope Lucius III	
Ansanus	c. 285	c. 304	found in Roman Martyrology	
Ansbert	unknown	c. 695		
Ansegisus	c. 770	20 July 833 or 834		
Anselm of Canterbury	c. 1033	21 April 1109	1163 by Pope Alexander III	
Anselm of Lucca	1036	18 March 1086		
Ansfried of Utrecht	900s	3 May 1010		
Ansgar	8 September 801	3 February 865	1584 by Pope Gregory XIII	
Ansovinus	700s	816		
Anstrudis	unknown	688		
Ansurius	800s	925		
Antanansio Bazzekuketta	1800s	27 May 1886	18 October 1964 by Pope Paul VI	One of the Uganda Martyrs
Anthelm of Belley	26 December 1107	26 June 1178	1368 by Pope Urban V	
Anthimus of Nicomedia	200s	303, 311, or 312	found in Roman Martyrology	
Anthimus of Rome	200s	303	found in Roman Martyrology	
Anthony Dainan	1584	5 February 1597	8 June 1862 by Pope Pius IX	One of the 26 Martyrs of Japan
Anthony Fantosati	16 October 1842	7 July 1900	1 October 2000 by Pope John Paul II	One of the Martyr Saints of China
Anthony Kim Songu	1795	29 April 1841	6 May 1984 by Pope John Paul II	One of the Korean Martyrs
Anthony Maria Zaccaria	1502	5 July 1539	27 May 1897 by Pope Leo XIII	
Anthony Mary Claret	23 December 1807	24 October 1870	7 May 1950 by Pope Pius XII	
Anthony Nguyen Huu Quynh	c. 1768	10 July 1840	19 June 1988 by Pope John Paul II	One of the Vietnamese Martyrs
Anthony of Antioch	266	302	found in Roman Martyrology	
Anthony of Hoornaar	1500s	9 July 1572	29 June 1867 by Pope Pius IX	One of the Martyrs of Gorkum
Anthony of Padua	15 August 1195	13 June 1231	30 May 1232 by Pope Gregory IX	
Antoninus of Florence	1 March 1389	2 May 1459	31 May 1523 by Pope Adrian VI	
Anthony of St. Ann Galvão	1739	23 December 1822	11 May 2007 by Pope Benedict XVI	First Brazilian saint. Professed priest of the Franciscan Friars Minor.
Anthony of Weert	1523	9 July 1572	29 June 1867 by Pope Pius IX	One of the Martyrs of Gorkum
Anthony the Great	12 January 251	17 January 356	found in Roman Martyrology	
Anthony the Hermit	c. 468	c. 520	1584 by Pope Gregory XIII	
Anthusa of Constantinople	750 or 757	801 or 808		Daughter of Constantine V
Antia of Illyria	unknown	c. 138	found in Roman Martyrology	
Antiochus of Sulcis	0s	c. 110 AD	found in Roman Martyrology	
Antipas of Pergamum	unknown	0s	found in Roman Martyrology	
Antoine Daniel	27 May 1601	4 July 1648	29 June 1930 by Pope Pius XI	One of the Canadian Martyrs
Anthony of Kiev	c. 983	c. 1073	found in Roman Martyrology, added in 2001)	Russian Orthodox, founder of the Kiev Pechersk Lavra
Antoninus of Pamiers	unknown	unknown		
Antoninus of Piacenza	200s	303	found in Roman Martyrology	
Antoninus of Rome	100s	186	found in Roman Martyrology	
Antoninus of Sorrento	555 or 556	625		
Antônio Baracho	unknown	3 October 1645	15 October 2017 by Pope Francis	One of the Martyrs of Natal
Antonio Gonzalez	1593	24 September 1637	18 October 1987 by Pope John Paul II	One of the 16 Martyrs of Japan
Antonio Maria Gianelli	12 April 1789	7 June 1846	21 October 1951 by Pope Pius XII	Bishop of Bobbio; founder of the Daughters of Our Lady of the Garden
Antonio Maria Pucci	16 April 1819	12 January 1892	9 December 1962 by Pope John XXIII	
Antonio of Tlaxcala	c. 1516	1529	15 October 2017 by Pope Francis	One of the Child Martyrs of Tlaxcala
Antonio Primaldo	1400s	14 August 1480	12 May 2013 by Pope Francis	One of the Martyrs of Otranto
Antônio Vilela	unknown	3 October 1645	15 October 2017 by Pope Francis	One of the Martyrs of Natal
Antônio Vilela Cid	unknown	3 October 1645	15 October 2017 by Pope Francis	One of the Martyrs of Natal
Anysia of Salonika	284	304	found in Roman Martyrology	
Aphian	c. 287	c. 305		
Aphrahat	c. 280	c. 345	found in Roman Martyrology	
Aphrodisius	25 May 7 AD	28 April 65 AD	found in Roman Martyrology	Priest of the Diocese of Béziers, martyr
Apollinaris Claudius	0s	100s	found in Roman Martyrology	
Apollinaris of Ravenna	unknown	c.79 AD	found in Roman Martyrology	
Apollinaris of Valence	c. 453	c. 520		
Apollinaris Syncletica	unknown	420		
Apollonia	100s	249	found in Roman Martyrology	
Apollonius the Apologist	100s	21 April 185	found in Roman Martyrology	
Apollos	0s	0s		
Apphia	unknown	68 AD	found in Roman Martyrology	
Apronia of Toul	500s	500s		
Aprus of Toul	600s	15 September 507		
Aquila	0s	0s		listed among the Seventy Disciples
Aquilina	281	13 June 293		Child martyr
Aquilinus of Évreux	c. 620	695	found in Roman Martyrology	
Aquilinus of Fossombrone	unknown	200s	found in Roman Martyrology	
Aquilinus of Milan	unknown	1015		
Arbogast	unknown	c. 678		
Arcadius of Bourges	unknown	549		
Arcadius of Mauretania	200s	c. 302	found in Roman Martyrology	
Arcangelo Tadini	12 December 1846	20 May 1912	26 April 2009 by Pope Benedict XVI	
Archippus	unknown	0s	found in Roman Martyrology	
Aredius	c. 510	591		
Arethas	unknown	c. 523		
Argeus of Tomi	200s	c. 320	found in Roman Martyrology	
Argymirus of Córdoba	unknown	28 June 856	found in Roman Martyrology	One of the Martyrs of Córdoba
Ariadne of Phrygia	unknown	130	found in Roman Martyrology	
Arialdo	c. 1010	27 June 1066		
Arilda of Oldbury	unknown	400s or 500s	found in medieval Benedictine liturgical calendars	
Aristides of Athens	unknown	unknown		
Aristobulus of Britannia	unknown	0s		First Bishop of Roman Britain
Armogastes	unknown	after 460		
Arnold Janssen	5 November 1837	15 January 1909	5 October 2003 by Pope John Paul II	
Arnold of Arnoldsweiler	700s	700s		
Arnold of Soissons	1040	1087	6 January 1120 by Pope Callixtus II	
Arnulf of Metz	c. 582	c. 647		
Arsenius the Great	c. 350	445		Desert Father
Artaldus	1101	1206	2 June 1834 (equipollent) by Pope Gregory XVI	
Artémides Zatti	12 October 1880	15 March 1951	9 October 2022 by Pope Francis	
Artemius	unknown	362		
Arthelais	544	560		
Asaph	500s	1 May 596	found in Roman Martyrology	
Ascelina	1121	1195		
Asclepiades of Antioch	unknown	217		
Asella	c. 334	c. 406		
Aspren	0s	100s	found in Roman Martyrology	
Assicus	unknown	c. 490		St. Patrick's coppersmith
Asteria of Bergamo	200s	307	found in Roman Martyrology	
Asterius of Amasea	c. 350	c. 410		
Asterius of Petra	unknown	365	found in Roman Martyrology	
Astius	0s	117 AD	found in Roman Martyrology	Bishop of Dyrrachium
Athanasia of Aegina	c. 790	14 August 860		
Athanasius I	830	872		
Athanasius of Alexandria	296–298	2 May 373	found in Roman Martyrology	
Athanasius the Athonite	c. 920	c. 1003		
Athelm	unknown	8 January 926		
Athracht	500s	500s		
Atilano Cruz Alvarado	5 October 1901	1 July 1928	21 May 2000 by Pope John Paul II	One of the Saints of the Cristero War
Attala	unknown	622		
Attilanus	937	1007	1095 by Pope Urban II	
Audax	200s	250	found in Roman Martyrology	
Audifax	200s	270	found in Roman Martyrology	
Audoin	609	24 August 684		
Augulus	unknown	unknown		
Augusta of Treviso	unknown	unknown		
Auguste Chapdelaine	6 January 1814	29 February 1856	1 October 2000 by Pope John Paul II	One of the Martyr Saints of China
Augustin Schoeffler	22 November 1822	1 May 1851	19 June 1988 by Pope John Paul II	One of the Vietnamese Martyrs
Augustine of Canterbury	500s	26 May 604	found in Roman Martyrology	Founder of the English church and first Archbishop of Canterbury
Augustine Nguyễn Văn Mới	c. 1806	19 December 1839	19 June 1988 by Pope John Paul II	One of the Vietnamese Martyrs
Augustine of Hippo	13 November 354	28 August 430	found in Roman Martyrology	
Augustine Pak Chongwon	1793	31 January 1840	6 May 1984 by Pope John Paul II	One of the Korean Martyrs
Augustine Phan Viết Huy	c. 1795	12 June 1839	19 June 1988 by Pope John Paul II	One of the Vietnamese Martyrs
Augustine Webster	1400s	4 May 1535	25 October 1970 by Pope Paul VI	One of the Forty Martyrs of England and Wales
Augustine Yi Kwanghon	1787	24 May 1839	6 May 1984 by Pope John Paul II	One of the Korean Martyrs
Augustine Yu Chinkil	1791	22 September 1839	6 May 1984 by Pope John Paul II	One of the Korean Martyrs
Augustine Zhao Rong	c. 1746	27 January 1815	1 October 2000 by Pope John Paul II	One of the Martyr Saints of China
Augusto Andrés	6 May 1910	9 October 1934	21 November 1999 by Pope John Paul II	One of the Martyrs of Turon
Aurea of Córdoba	unknown	19 July 856	found in Roman Martyrology	One of the Martyrs of Córdoba
Aurea of Ostia	unknown	200s		
Aurea of Paris	unknown	666		
Áurea of San Millán	1043	11 March 1070		
Aurelian of Limoges	unknown	unknown		
Aurelius of Carthage	unknown	20 July 429		
Aurelius of Córdoba	c. 825	27 July 852	found in Roman Martyrology	One of the Martyrs of Córdoba
Aureus of Mainz	unknown	16 June 436 or 451		
Auspicius of Trier	unknown	c. 130	found in Roman Martyrology	
Austrebertha	630	10 February 704		
Austregisilus	unknown	624		
Austromoine	200s	200s		
Autonomus	200s	c. 313	found in Roman Martyrology	
Auxentius of Bithynia	c. 400	14 February 473		
Auxentius of Mopsuestia	unknown	360		
Aventinus of Tours	unknown	1180		
Avilius of Alexandria	unknown	11 September 95		Patriarch of Alexandria
Avitianus	unknown	325		
Avitus of Vienne	c. 450	between 517-519		
Aye	unknown	c. 711		
Aymard of Cluny	unknown	965		
Babylas of Antioch	unknown	253		
Bacchus	unknown	300s	found in Roman Martyrology	
Bademus	unknown	10 April 376		
Baithéne mac Brénaind	c. 534	c. 596-598		
Balbina of Rome	unknown	c. 130	found in Roman Martyrology	
Balderic of Montfaucon	600s	600s		
Baldred of Tyninghame	unknown	6 March 757		
Baldwin of Rieti	unknown	1140		
Balthild of Chelles	626 or 627	30 January 680		
Baradates	unknown	c. 460		
Barbara	200s	200s–300s	found in Roman Martyrology	
Barbara Cho Chungi	1782	29 December 1839	6 May 1984 by Pope John Paul II	One of the Korean Martyrs
Barbara Choe Yongi	1819	1 February 1840	6 May 1984 by Pope John Paul II	One of the Korean Martyrs
Barbara Cui Lianshi	c. 1849	15 June 1900	1 October 2000 by Pope John Paul II	One of the Martyr Saints of China
Barbara Han Agi	1792	24 May 1839	6 May 1984 by Pope John Paul II	One of the Korean Martyrs
Barbara Kim	1805	27 May 1839	6 May 1984 by Pope John Paul II	One of the Korean Martyrs
Barbara Ko Suni	1798	29 December 1839	6 May 1984 by Pope John Paul II	One of the Korean Martyrs
Barbara Kwon Hui	1794	3 September 1839	6 May 1984 by Pope John Paul II	One of the Korean Martyrs
Barbara Yi	1825	27 May 1839	6 May 1984 by Pope John Paul II	One of the Korean Martyrs
Barbara Yi Chonghui	1825	27 May 1839	6 May 1984 by Pope John Paul II	One of the Korean Martyrs
Barbatus of Benevento	c. 610	682		
Barhadbesciabas	unknown	20 July 355		
Barlaam	unknown	unknown		
Barnabas	unknown	61 AD	found in Roman Martyrology	
Barsanuphius	unknown	c. 545		
Barsimaeus	unknown	114		
Bartholomew Chong Munho	1802	13 December 1866	6 May 1984 by Pope John Paul II	One of the Korean Martyrs
Bartholomew of Braga	3 May 1514	16 July 1590	5 July 2019 (equipollent) by Pope Francis	
Bartholomew of Farne	unknown	1193		
Bartholomew the Apostle	0s	0s	found in Roman Martyrology	
Bartolomea Capitanio	13 January 1807	26 July 1833	18 May 1950 by Pope Pius XII	Cofounder of the Sisters of Charity of Saints Bartolomea Capitanio and Vincenzo Gerosa (Sisters of the Holy Child Mary)
Barulas	200s	303	found in Roman Martyrology	
Basil of Amasea	unknown	300s	found in Roman Martyrology	
Basil of Ancyra	unknown	28 or 29 June 362	found in Roman Martyrology	
Basil of Caesarea	329 or 330	1 or 2 January 379	found in Roman Martyrology	
Basil the Elder	unknown	300s	found in Roman Martyrology	
Basilides	200s	c. 303	found in Roman Martyrology	
Basiliscus of Comana	200s	c. 310		
Basilissa	0s	68 AD	found in Roman Martyrology	
Basilla of Rome	unknown	257		
Bassianus of Lodi	c. 320	c. 413		
Baudolino	c. 700	c. 740		
Bavo of Ghent	622	653	found in Roman Martyrology	
Beatrice of Silva	c. 1424	16 August 1492	3 October 1976 by Pope Paul VI	
Beatrix	200s	302 or 303	found in Roman Martyrology	
Beatus of Liébana	c. 750	c. 800		
Beatus of Lungern	unknown	c. 112		
Bécán	400s	500s		
Bede	c. 673	26 May 735	found in Roman Martyrology	Also known as the Venerable Bede
Bega	unknown	unknown		
Begga	615	17 December 693		
Belina	unknown	1153	1203 by Pope Innocent III	
Bellinus of Padua	unknown	26 November 1145	1431–1447 by Pope Eugene IV	
Benedetta Cambiagio Frassinello	2 October 1791	21 March 1858	19 May 2002 by Pope John Paul II	Founder of the Benedictine Sisters of Providence
Benedict Biscop	c. 628	12 January 690		
Benedict dell'Antella	1200s	20 August 1268	15 January 1888 by Pope Leo XIII	One of the Seven Holy Founders of the Servite Order
Benedict Joseph Labre	25 March 1748	16 April 1783	8 December 1881 by Pope Leo XIII	
Benedict Menni	11 March 1841	24 April 1914	21 November 1999 by Pope John Paul II	
Benedict of Aniane	747	12 February 821		
Benedict of Cagliari	unknown	1112		
Benedict of Nursia	2 March 480	21 March 547	1220 by Pope Honorius III	
Benedict of Szkalka	900s	1012	1083 or 1085 by Pope Gregory VII	
Benedict the Moor	1526	4 April 1589	24 May 1807 by Pope Pius VII	
Benedicta Hyong Kyongnyon	1794	29 December 1839	6 May 1984 by Pope John Paul II	One of the Korean Martyrs
Bénézet	1163	1184	13th century	Patron saint of Avignon, bachelors, and bridge-builders
Benignus of Armagh	392	467		
Beningnus of Dijon	200s	200s		
Benignus of Todi	200s	303	found in Roman Martyrology	
Benildis of Córdoba	unknown	15 June 853	found in Roman Martyrology	One of the Martyrs of Córdoba
Benildus Romançon	14 June 1805	13 August 1862	29 October 1967 by Pope Paul VI	
Benjamin	329	c. 424		
Benjamín Julián	27 October 1908	9 October 1934	21 November 1999 by Pope John Paul II	One of the Martyrs of Turon
Benno	c. 1010	16 June 1106	31 May 1523 by Pope Adrian VI	
Benvenutus Scotivoli	1200s	22 March 1282	1284 by Pope Martin IV	
Beóán of Mortlach	900s	1000s	11 July 1898 (equipollent) by Pope Leo XIII	
Berard of Carbio	1100s	16 January 1220	7 August 1481 by Pope Sixtus IV	
Berardo	1000s	19 December 1123		
Berardo dei Marsi	1079	3 November 1130	10 May 1802 (equipollent) by Pope Pius VII	
Bercharius of Hautvillers	636	28 March 696		
Berhtwald	unknown	731		
Berlinda of Meerbeke	unknown	c. 702		
Bernard degli Uberti	c. 1060	4 December 1133	3 December 1139 by Pope Innocent II	
Bernard of Carinola	1000s	1109	found in Roman Martyrology	
Bernard of Clairvaux	1090	20 August 1153	18 January 1174 by Pope Alexander III	Reformer of the Cistercian Order
Bernard of Corleone	6 February 1605	12 January 1667	10 June 2001 by Pope John Paul II	
Bernard of Menthon	c. 1020	June 1081	1681 (equipollent) by Pope Innocent XI	Professed religious of the Canons Regular of Saint Augustine
Bernard of Valdeiglesias	unknown	c. 1155		
Bernard of Thiron	1046	14 April 1117		
Bernard Vũ Văn Duệ	1755	1 August 1838	19 June 1988 by Pope John Paul II	One of the Vietnamese Martyrs
Bernadette Soubirous	7 January 1844	16 April 1879	8 December 1933 Rome by Pope Pius XI	
Bernardino of Siena	8 September 1380	20 May 1444	24 May 1450 by Pope Nicholas V	
Bernardino Realino	1 December 1530	2 July 1616	22 June 1947 by Pope Pius XII	Professed priest of the Jesuits
Bernardo Tolomei	10 May 1272	20 August 1348	26 April 2009 by Pope Benedict XVI	
Bernat Calbó	c. 1180	26 October 1243	26 September 1710 (equipollent) by Pope Clement XI	
Bernward of Hildesheim	960	20 November 1022	8 January 1193 by Pope Celestine III	
Bertha of Bingen	unknown	757		
Bertha of Val d'Or	unknown	690		
Bertharius of Monte Cassino	c. 810	22 October 883	14 April 1728 (equipollent) by Pope Benedict XIII	
Berthold of Parma	unknown	1111		
Bertilia	unknown	687		
Bertin	c. 615	c. 709		
Bertrand of Comminges	c.1050	1126	1309 by Pope Clement V	
Bertulf of Bobbio	unknown	640		
Beuno	500s	21 April 640		Also known as Bono
Bibiana	300s	300s	found in Roman Martyrology	
Birillus	unknown	90 AD	found in Roman Martyrology	
Birinus	c. 600	3 December 649 or 650		
Bishoy Stéphanos Kamel	4 September 1990	15 February 2015	found in Roman Martyrology (added on 11 May 2023 by Pope Francis)	Coptic Orthodox, one of the 21 Coptic Christian Martyrs of Libya
Blaesilla	364	384		
Blaise	200s	316	found in Roman Martyrology	
Blandina	c. 162	177	found in Roman Martyrology	
Blane	500s	590	11 July 1898 (equipollent) by Pope Leo XIII	
Blathmac	c. 750	c. 825		
Bodfan	600s	unknown		
Boethius	c. 477	524	20 December 1883 (equipollent) by Pope Leo XIII	
Boisil	unknown	7 July 664		
Bonaventure	1221	15 July 1274	14 April 1482 by Pope Sixtus IV	
Bonaventure of Miyako	1500s	5 February 1597	8 June 1862 by Pope Pius IX	One of the 26 Martyrs of Japan
Bonfilius	1040	1125	found in Roman Martyrology	
Boniface	c. 675	5 June 754		
Boniface of Brussels	1183	19 February 1260	1702 by Pope Clement XI	
Boniface of Tarsus	200s	307	found in Roman Martyrology	
Bonifacia Rodríguez y Castro	6 June 1837	8 August 1905	23 October 2011 by Pope Benedict XVI	
Bononio	900s	30 August 1026	1026 by Pope John XIX	
Boris	986	1015		
Bosa of York	unknown	c. 705		
Botulph of Thorney	600s	680		
Brannoc of Braunton	500s	unknown		
Branwalator	unknown	unknown		
Bregowine	unknown	August 764		
Brendan of Birr	unknown	c. 573		
Brendan the Navigator	c. 484	c. 577		
Bretannio	300s	380	found in Roman Martyrology	
Brice of Tours	c. 370	444	found in Roman Martyrology	
Bridget of Sweden	c. 1303	23 July 1373	7 October 1391 by Pope Boniface IX	
Brigid of Kildare	c. 451	c. 525	found in Roman Martyrology	
Brinolfo Algotsson	1240–1248	6 February 1317	7 October 1391 by Pope Boniface IX	
Brioc	400s	c. 502		
Britta	unknown	300s		
Britto of Trier	374	386		
Brónach	500s	500s		
Bruno of Cologne	c. 1030	6 October 1101	17 February 1623 by Pope Gregory XV	
Bruno of Querfurt	c. 974	14 February 1009	found in Roman Martyrology	
Bruno of Saxony	c. 830	2 February 880		
Bruno of Segni	c. 1045	18 July 1123	5 September 1181 by Pope Lucius III	
Bruno of Würzburg	c. 1005	27 May 1045		
Bruno the Great	925	965		
Bruno Sserunkuuma	1800s	3 June 1886	18 October 1964 by Pope Paul VI	One of the Uganda Martyrs
Brynach	unknown	500s		
Brynoth	1200s	6 February 1317	found in Roman Martyrology	
Budoc	400s	500s		
Buonfiglio Monaldi	1200s	1 January 1261	15 January 1888 by Pope Leo XIII	One of the Seven Holy Founders of the Servite Order
Buriana	500s	500s		
Cadfan	unknown	500s		
Cadoc	c. 497	580		
Cædmon of Whitby	c. 657	c. 684		
Caesaria the Elder	400s	c. 530		
Caesarius of Arles	c. 468	27 August 542		
Caesarius of Nazianzus	c. 331	c. 368	found in Roman Martyrology	
Caesarius of Terracina	unknown	200s		
Caillín	400s	unknown		
Cainnech of Aghaboe	c. 515	600	found in Roman Martyrology	
Caius of Milan	unknown	200s	found in Roman Martyrology	
Caius of Saragossa	unknown	unknown	found in Roman Martyrology	
Cajetan	1 October 1480	7 August 1547	12 April 1671 by Pope Clement X	
Calepodius	unknown	232		
Calimerius	unknown	280		
Callistus Caravario	18 June 1903	25 February 1930	1 October 2000 by Pope John Paul II	One of the Martyr Saints of China
Calminius	unknown	500s or 600s		
Calocerus	unknown	130	found in Roman Martyrology	
Calogerus the Anchorite	c. 466	561		
Camilla Battista da Varano	9 April 1458	31 May 1524	17 October 2010 by Pope Benedict XVI	
Camillus de Lellis	25 May 1550	14 July 1614	29 June 1746 by Pope Benedict XIV	
Candida Maria of Jesus	31 May 1845	9 August 1912	17 October 2010 by Pope Benedict XVI	
Candida the Elder	unknown	0s	found in Roman Martyrology	
Candidus	200s	c. 287		
Canius	200s	200s		
Cantius, Cantianus, and Cantianilla	unknown	c. 304		
Canute IV of Denmark	c. 1042	10 July 1086	19 April 1101 by Pope Paschal II	
Canute Lavard	1096	7 January 1131	1169 by Pope Alexander III	
Caprasius of Agen	200s	303	found in Roman Martyrology	
Caprasius of Lérins	unknown	430		
Caradoc	1000s	1124	found in Roman Martyrology	
Caraunus	400s	unknown		
Carlo Acutis	3 May 1991	12 October 2006	7 September 2025 by Pope Leo XIV	
Carmelo Bolta Bañuls	29 May 1803	10 July 1860	20 October 2024 by Pope Francis	
Carmen Salles y Barangueras	9 April 1848	25 July 1911	21 October 2012 by Pope Benedict XVI	
Carolina Santocanale	2 October 1852	27 January 1923	15 May 2022 by Pope Francis	
Carpus of Beroea	unknown	0s	found in Roman Martyrology	
Carthage the Elder	unknown	500s		
Casilda of Toledo	950	1050		
Casimir	3 October 1458	4 March 1484	1521 by Pope Leo X or 1602 by Pope Clement VIII	
Cassian of Autun	unknown	c. 350		
Cassian of Imola	300s	13 August 363	found in Roman Martyrology	
Cassian of Tangier	200s	298		
Cassius of Clermont	200s	c. 264		
Cassius of Narni	unknown	558		
Castor of Apt	300s	c. 420		
Castor of Karden	300s	c. 400		
Castritian	unknown	137	found in Roman Martyrology	Bishop of Milan
Castulus	200s	286	found in Roman Martyrology	
Catald of Taranto	7th century	685	found in Roman Martyrology	
Catellus of Castellammare	unknown	800s		
Caterina Volpicelli	21 January 1839	28 December 1894	26 April 2009 by Pope Benedict XVI	
Cathan	unknown	unknown		
Catherina Chong Choryom	1817	20 September 1846	6 May 1984 by Pope John Paul II	One of the Korean Martyrs
Catherine Labouré	2 May 1806	31 December 1876	27 July 1947 by Pope Pius XII	
Catherine of Alexandria	c. 287	c. 305	found in Roman Martyrology	
Catherine of Bologna	8 September 1413	9 March 1463	22 May 1712 by Pope Clement XI	
Catherine of Genoa	1447	1510	16 June 1737 by Pope Clement XII	
Catherine of Palma	1 May 1533	5 April 1574	22 June 1930 by Pope Pius XI	
Catherine of Ricci	23 April 1522	2 February 1590	29 June 1746 by Pope Benedict XIV	
Catherine of Siena	25 March 1347	29 April 1380	29 April 1461 by Pope Pius II	
Catherine of Vadstena	2 October 1538	24 March 1381	1484 (cultus confirmed) by Innocent VIII	
Catherine Soiron	2 February 1742	17 July 1794	18 December 2024 by Pope Francis	One of the Martyrs of Compiègne
Catherine Yi	1783	September 1839	6 May 1984 by Pope John Paul II	One of the Korean Martyrs
Ceccardus of Luni	unknown	860	9 April 1832 (equipollent) by Pope Gregory XVI	
Cedd	c. 620	October 26, 664		
Cecilia	100s	222–235	found in Roman Martyrology	
Cecilia Yu Sosa	1761	23 November 1839	6 May 1984 by Pope John Paul II	One of the Korean Martyrs
Cellach of Armagh	1080	1129	found in Roman Martyrology	
Celsus	unknown	unknown	found in Roman Martyrology	
Cermanus	200s	c. 305	found in Roman Martyrology	
César de Bus	3 February 1544	15 April 1607	15 May 2022 by Pope Francis	
Cesidio Giacomantonio	30 August 1873	4 July 1900	1 October 2000 by Pope John Paul II	One of the Martyr Saints of China
Cessianus	c. 295	303		
Chad of Mercia	c. 634	March 2, 672	found in Roman Martyrology	
Charbel	0s	107		
Charbel Makhlouf	8 May 1828	24 December 1898	9 October 1977 by Pope Paul VI	
Charles Borromeo	2 October 1538	3 November 1584	1 November 1610 by Paul V	
Charles Cho Shinchol	1795	26 September 1839	6 May 1984 by Pope John Paul II	One of the Korean Martyrs
Charles de Foucauld	15 September 1858	1 December 1916	15 May 2022 by Pope Francis	
Charles Garnier	25 May 1606	7 December 1649	29 June 1930 by Pope Pius XI	One of the Canadian Martyrs
Charles Hyon Songmun	1797	19 September 1846	6 May 1984 by Pope John Paul II	One of the Korean Martyrs
Charles Lwanga	1 January 1860	3 June 1886	18 October 1964 by Pope Paul VI	One of the Uganda Martyrs
Charles of Mount Argus	11 December 1821	5 January 1893	3 June 2007 by Pope Benedict XVI	
Charles of Sezze	19 October 1613	6 January 1670	12 April 1959 by Pope John XXIII	Professed priest of the Franciscan Friars Minor
Charlotte of the Resurrection	16 September 1715	17 July 1794	18 December 2024 by Pope Francis	One of the Martyrs of Compiègne
Chelidonia	c. 1 October 1077	13 October 1152	found in Roman Martyrology	
Chi Zhuzi	c. 1882	June or July 1900	1 October 2000 by Pope John Paul II	One of the Martyr Saints of China
Christian of Clogher	1000s	1138		
Christina of Bolsena	200s	200s	found in Roman Martyrology	
Christopher	unknown	c. 251	found in Roman Martyrology	
Christopher of Córdoba	unknown	20 August 852	found in Roman Martyrology	One of the Martyrs of Córdoba
Chrysogonus	200s	300s	found in Roman Martyrology	
Ciarán of Clonmacnoise	c. 516	549		
Ciarán of Saigir	400s	c. 530		
Cirilo Bertrán	20 March 1888	9 October 1934	21 November 1999 by Pope John Paul II	One of the Martyrs of Turon
Clare of Assisi	16 July 1194	11 August 1253	26 September 1255 by Pope Alexander IV	
Clare of Montefalco	1268	18 August 1308	8 December 1881 by Pope Leo XIII	
Clateus	unknown	64 AD	found in Roman Martyrology	
Claude de la Colombière	2 February 1641	15 February 1682	31 May 1992 by Pope John Paul II	
Claudine Thévenet	30 March 1774	3 February 1837	21 March 1993 by Pope John Paul II	Founder of the Religious of Jesus and Mary
Claudius of Besançon	c. 607	6 June 696 or 699		
Clelia Barbieri	13 February 1847	13 July 1870	9 April 1989 by Pope John Paul II	
Clelia Nanetti	9 January 1872	9 July 1900	1 October 2000 by Pope John Paul II	One of the Martyr Saints of China
Clement Mary Hofbauer	26 December 1751	15 March 1820	20 May 1909 by Pope Pius X	Professed priest of the Redemptorists
Clement of Ancyra	c. 258	312		
Clement of Ohrid	830–840	27 July 916		
Clemente Ignacio Delgado Cebrian, OP	22 November 1762	12 July 1838	19 June 1988 by Pope John Paul II	One of the Vietnamese Martyrs
Cleopatra	200s	319 or 327		
Clotilde	c. 474	545		
Colette of Corbie	13 January 1381	6 March 1447	24 May 1807 by Pope Pius VII	
Colman mac Duagh	560	29 October 632		
Colmán of Cloyne	15 October 522	24 November 600		
Colmán of Lindisfarne	c. 605	674	11 July 1898 (equipollent) by Pope Leo XIII	
Coloman of Stockerau	900s	18 October 1012	found in Roman Martyrology	
Columba Kim Hyoim	1814	26 September 1839	6 May 1984 by Pope John Paul II	One of the Korean Martyrs
Columba of Córdoba	unknown	17 September 853	found in Roman Martyrology	One of the Martyrs of Córdoba
Columban	540	23 November 615		
Comgán of Lochalsh	unknown	700s	11 July 1898 (equipollent) by Pope Leo XIII	
Concordius of Spoleto	100s	c.175	found in Roman Martyrology	
Conon of Naso	3 June 1139	28 March 1236	16 February 1630 (equipollent) by Pope Urban VIII	
Conrad of Bavaria	c. 1105	17 March 1126 or 1154	9 April 1832 (equipollent) by Pope Gregory XVI	
Conrad of Constance	c. 900	26 November 975	1123 by Pope Callixtus II	
Conrad of Parzham	22 December 1818	21 April 1894	20 May 1934 by Pope Pius XI	
Conrad of Piacenza	1290	19 February 1351	2 June 1625 by Pope Urban VIII	
Constabilis	1070	17 February 1124	21 December 1893 (equipollent) by Pope Leo XIII	
Constance of Jesus Meunier	28 May 1765	17 July 1794	18 December 2024 by Pope Francis	One of the Martyrs of Compiègne
Constantine the Great	27 February c. 272	22 May 337		Constantine is not recognized as a canonized saint by the Roman Catholic Church, although he is in many other churches.
Constantine of Dumnonia	c. 520	576	11 July 1898 (equipollent) by Pope Leo XIII	
Constantius of Perugia	unknown	c. 170	found in Roman Martyrology	
Conus	late 1100s	early 1200s	27 April 1871 (equipollent) by Pope Pius IX	
Conwoïon	c. 800	868	3 May 1866 (equipollent) by Pope Pius IX	
Corbinian	c. 670	8 September c. 730		
Corebus	unknown	138	found in Roman Martyrology	
Cornelius of Wijk bij Duurstede	1548	9 July 1572	29 June 1867 by Pope Pius IX	One of the Martyrs of Gorkum
Cosmas	200s	c. 287	found in Roman Martyrology	
Cosmas Takeya	1500s	5 February 1597	8 June 1862 by Pope Pius IX	One of the 26 Martyrs of Japan
Crescentian	200s	c. 303	found in Roman Martyrology	
Crescentinus	c. 292	c. 303	found in Roman Martyrology	
Crescentius of Rome	c. 292	c. 303	found in Roman Martyrology	
Crescentius of Saragossa	unknown	unknown	found in Roman Martyrology	
Crispin of Pavia	unknown	7 January 467	20 December 1888 (equipollent) by Pope Leo XIII	
Crispin of Viterbo	13 November 1668	19 May 1750	20 June 1982 by Pope John Paul II	Professed priest of the Franciscan Capuchins
Cristóbal Magallanes Jara	30 July 1869	25 May 1927	21 May 2000 by Pope John Paul II	One of the Saints of the Cristero War
Cristobal of Tlaxcala	c. 1514	1527	15 October 2017 by Pope Francis	One of the Child Martyrs of Tlaxcala
Cucuphas	269	c. 304	found in Roman Martyrology	
Cunibert	c. 600	12 November c. 663	found in Roman Martyrology	
Cunigunde of Luxembourg	975	3 March 1040	29 March 1200 by Pope Innocent III	Empress
Cuthbert	c. 634	20 March 687	found in Roman Martyrology	
Cuthbert Mayne	c. 1543	29 November 1577	25 October 1970 by Pope Paul VI	One of the Forty Martyrs of England and Wales
Cyprian	c. 200	14 September 258	found in Roman Martyrology	
Cyriacus	200s	c. 303	found in Roman Martyrology	
Cyriacus of Satala	200s	304	found in Roman Martyrology	
Cyril	826–827	14 February 869	found in Roman Martyrology	
Cyril of Alexandria	c. 376	444	found in Roman Martyrology	
Cyril of Jerusalem	c. 313	386	found in Roman Martyrology	
Cyrinus of Rome	200s	c. 303	found in Roman Martyrology	
Dabheog	400s	400s		
Dalmatius of Pavia	200s	254 or 304	found in Roman Martyrology	
Damian	200s	c. 287	found in Roman Martyrology	
Damian Nam Myonghyok	1802	24 May 1839	6 May 1984 by Pope John Paul II	One of the Korean Martyrs
Damien of Molokai	3 January 1840	15 April 1889	11 October 2009 by Pope Benedict XVI	Known for his work with people with leprosy in a settlement on the Kalaupapa Peninsula of Molokaʻi.
Daniel Fasanella	c. 1190s	10 October 1227	22 January 1516 by Pope Leo X	One of the seven Franciscan martyrs of Ceuta
Daniel of Padua	unknown	168	found in Roman Martyrology	
Daniele Comboni	15 March 1831	10 October 1881	5 October 2003 by Pope John Paul II	
Darerca of Ireland	300s	400s		
Darius	unknown	early 300s	found in Roman Martyrology	
Dathus	100s	190	found in Roman Martyrology	Bishop of Ravenna
David	c. 500	1 March 589		
David Galván Bermúdez	29 January 1881	30 January 1915	21 May 2000 by Pope John Paul II	One of the Saints of the Cristero War
David Lewis	1616	27 August 1679	25 October 1970 by Pope Paul VI	One of the Forty Martyrs of England and Wales
David of Munktorp	1000s	1082		
David Roldán Lara	2 March 1907	15 August 1926	21 May 2000 by Pope John Paul II	One of the Saints of the Cristero War
David the Dendrite	c. 450	540		
David Uribe Velasco	29 December 1889	12 April 1927	21 May 2000 by Pope John Paul II	One of the Saints of the Cristero War
Demetrius of Thessaloniki	280	305 or 306	found in Roman Martyrology	
Denis	200s	250, 258, or 270	found in Roman Martyrology	Bishop of Paris
Denis Ssebuggwawo Wasswa	1870	25 May 1886	18 October 1964 by Pope Paul VI	One of the Uganda Martyrs
Deodat of Rodez	c. 1340	14 November 1391	21 June 1970 by Pope Paul VI	Companion of Nicholas Tavelic
Deodatus of Nevers	unknown	679	3 December 1049 by Pope Leo IX	
Devasahayam Pillai	23 April 1712	14 January 1752	15 May 2022 by Pope Francis	
Devota	200s	c. 303		
Didacus of Alcalá	c. 1400	12 November 1463	1588 by Pope Sixtus V	
Didymus of Alexandria	200s	304	found in Roman Martyrology	
Digna of Córdoba	unknown	14 June 853	found in Roman Martyrology	One of the Martyrs of Córdoba
Diodorus of Tarsus	300s	390		
Diogo Pereira	unknown	3 October 1645	15 October 2017 by Pope Francis	One of the Martyrs of Natal
Diomedes of Tarsus	200s	298–311		
Dionysius of Alexandria	unknown	22 March 264	found in Roman Martyrology	
Dionysius of Corinth	unknown	100s	found in Roman Martyrology	
Dionysius of Vienne	100s	193	found in Roman Martyrology	
Dionysius the Areopagite	0s	0s	found in Roman Martyrology	
Dismas	unknown	30–33 AD	found in Roman Martyrology	
Domingos Carvalho	unknown	16 July 1645	15 October 2017 by Pope Francis	One of the Martyrs of Natal
Domingo Henares de Zafra Cubero, OP	19 December 1765	25 June 1838	19 June 1988 by Pope John Paul II	One of the Vietnamese Martyrs
Domingo Ibáñez de Erquicia	c.1589	14 August 1633	18 October 1987 by Pope John Paul II	One of the 16 Martyrs of Japan
Dominic Bùi Van Úy	c. 1801	19 December 1839	19 June 1988 by Pope John Paul II	One of the Vietnamese Martyrs
Dominic Cẩm		11 March 1859	19 June 1988 by Pope John Paul II	One of the Vietnamese Martyrs
Dominic de Guzmán	8 August 1170	6 August 1221	13 July 1234 by Pope Gregory IX	
Dominic de la Calzada	1019	12 May 1109	found in Roman Martyrology	
Dominic Đinh Đạt	c. 1803	18 July 1839	19 June 1988 by Pope John Paul II	One of the Vietnamese Martyrs
Dominic Huyện	c. 1817	5 June 1862	19 June 1988 by Pope John Paul II	One of the Vietnamese Martyrs
Dominic Mậu	c. 1794	5 November 1858	19 June 1988 by Pope John Paul II	One of the Vietnamese Martyrs
Dominic Nguyên	c. 1802	16 June 1862	19 June 1988 by Pope John Paul II	One of the Vietnamese Martyrs
Dominic Nguyễn Đức Mạo	c. 1818	16 June 1862	19 June 1988 by Pope John Paul II	One of the Vietnamese Martyrs
Dominic Nguyễn Văn Hạnh	1772	1 August 1838	19 June 1988 by Pope John Paul II	One of the Vietnamese Martyrs
Dominic Nguyễn Văn Xuyên	c. 1786	26 November 1839	19 June 1988 by Pope John Paul II	One of the Vietnamese Martyrs
Dominic Nhi	c. 1812	16 June 1862	19 June 1988 by Pope John Paul II	One of the Vietnamese Martyrs
Dominic Ninh	c. 1835	2 June 1862	19 June 1988 by Pope John Paul II	One of the Vietnamese Martyrs
Dominic of Silos	1000	20 December 1073	found in Roman Martyrology	
Dominic Pham Trong Kham	c. 1780	13 January 1859	19 June 1988 by Pope John Paul II	One of the Vietnamese Martyrs
Dominic Savio	2 April 1842	9 March 1857	12 June 1954 by Pope Pius XII	
Dominic Toại	c. 1811	5 June 1862	19 June 1988 by Pope John Paul II	One of the Vietnamese Martyrs
Dominic Trạch Đoài	c. 1792	18 September 1840	19 June 1988 by Pope John Paul II	One of the Vietnamese Martyrs
Dominic Vũ Đình Tước	c. 1775	2 April 1839	19 June 1988 by Pope John Paul II	One of the Vietnamese Martyrs
Domitian of Carantania	700s	802		Duke of Carantania
Domnius	200s	304		
Domno of Montalcino	unknown	10 October 1227	22 January 1516 by Pope Leo X	One of the seven Franciscan martyrs of Ceuta
Donatus of Besançon	c. 590	660	24 November 1900 (equipollent) by Pope Leo XIII	
Donatus of Euroea	300s	387	found in Roman Martyrology	
Donatus of Fossombrone	unknown	200s	found in Roman Martyrology	
Donnán of Eigg	500s	17 April 617	11 July 1898 (equipollent) by Pope Leo XIII	
Dorothea of Alexandria	unknown	c. 320		
Dorothea of Caesarea	279–290	c. 311	found in Roman Martyrology	
Dorothea of Montau	6 February 1347	25 June 1394	1976 (cultus confirmed) by Pope Paul VI	
Drogo	14 March 1105	c. 16 April 1186	found in Roman Martyrology	
Drostan	unknown	early 700s	11 July 1898 (equipollent) by Pope Leo XIII	
Dubricius	c. 465	550		
Duthac	1000	1065	11 July 1898 (equipollent) by Pope Leo XIII	
Dymphna	7th century	30 May, 7th century	c. 620	born in Ireland; died in Geel, Belgium
Edith Stein	12 October 1891	9 August 1942	11 October 1998 by Pope John Paul II	Also known as Teresa Benedicta of the Cross
Edmund Arrowsmith	1585	28 August 1628	25 October 1970 by Pope Paul VI	One of the Forty Martyrs of England and Wales
Edmund Campion	24 January 1540	1 December 1581	25 October 1970 by Pope Paul VI	One of the Forty Martyrs of England and Wales
Edmund Gennings	1567	10 December 1591	25 October 1970 by Pope Paul VI	One of the Forty Martyrs of England and Wales
Edmund of Abingdon	20 November c. 1175	16 November 1240	16 December 1246 by Pope Innocent IV	
Edward the Confessor	c. 1003–1005	5 January 1066	7 February 1161 by Pope Alexander III	
Edward the Martyr	c. 962	18 March 978	found in Roman Martyrology	
Egidio Maria of Saint Joseph	16 November 1729	7 February 1812	2 June 1996 by Pope John Paul II	Professed priest of the Franciscan Friars Minor (Alcantarines)
Elena Guerra	23 June 1835	11 April 1914	20 October 2024 by Pope Francis	
Eleuchadius	0s	112	found in Roman Martyrology	Bishop of Ravenna
Eleutherius of Illyria	c. 100	c. 138	found in Roman Martyrology	
Elia Facchini	2 July 1839	9 July 1900	1 October 2000 by Pope John Paul II	One of the Martyr Saints of China
Elias of Córdoba	unknown	17 April 856	found in Roman Martyrology	One of the Martyrs of Córdoba
Elias of Palestine	200s	c. 304	found in Roman Martyrology	
Elizabeth Ann Seton	28 August 1774	4 January 1821	14 September 1975 by Pope Paul VI	First citizen born in the U.S. to be declared a saint.
Elizabeth Chong Chonghye	1797	29 December 1839	6 May 1984 by Pope John Paul II	One of the Korean Martyrs
Elizabeth Hesselblad	4 June 1870	24 April 1957	5 June 2016 by Pope Francis	
Elizabeth of Hungary	7 July 1207	17 November 1231	27 May 1235 by Pope Gregory IX	Patron saint of the homeless
Elizabeth of Portugal	c. 1271	4 July 1336	25 May 1625 by Pope Urban VIII	
Elizabeth of the Trinity	18 July 1880	9 November 1906	16 October 2016 by Pope Francis	
Elizabeth Qin Bianshi	c. 1846	19 July 1900	1 October 2000 by Pope John Paul II	One of the Martyr Saints of China
Eluned	c. 468	400s		
Elzéar of Sabran	1285	27 September 1323	1369 by Pope Urban V	
Emerentiana	200s	c. 304	found in Roman Martyrology	
Emeric of Hungary	c. 1006	2 September 1031	5 November 1083 by Pope Gregory VII	
Emilas of Córdoba	unknown	15 September 852	found in Roman Martyrology	One of the Martyrs of Córdoba
Émilie de Rodat	6 September 1787	19 September 1852	23 April 1950 by Pope Pius XII	Founder of the Sisters of the Holy Family of Villefranche
Émilie de Villeneuve	9 March 1811	2 October 1854	17 May 2015 by Pope Francis	
Emily de Vialar	12 September 1797	24 August 1856	24 June 1951 by Pope Pius XII	
Emma of Lesum	1000s	3 December 1038		
Emmanuel Lê Văn Phụng	c. 1796	13 July 1859	19 June 1988 by Pope John Paul II	One of the Vietnamese Martyrs
Emmanuel Nguyễn Văn Triệu	c. 1756	17 September 1798	19 June 1988 by Pope John Paul II	One of the Vietnamese Martyrs
Emygdius	279	309		
Engelbert Kolland	21 September 1827	10 July 1860	20 October 2024 by Pope Francis	
Engratia	200s	c. 303	found in Roman Martyrology	
Enrique de Ossó i Cervelló	16 October 1840	27 January 1896	16 June 1993 by Pope John Paul II	
Ephrem the Syrian	c. 306	9 June 373	found in Roman Martyrology	
Epimachus	unknown	c. 250	found in Roman Martyrology	
Epiphanius of Salamis	310–320	403		
Epitacius	unknown	unknown	found in Roman Martyrology	
Erasmus of Formia	200s	c. 303	found in Roman Martyrology	
Erhard of Regensburg	unknown	600s	8 October 1052 by Pope Leo IX	
Eric IX of Sweden	c. 1120–25	18 May 1160	found in Roman Martyrology	
Erlembald	1000s	15 April 1075		
Essam Badr Samir	15 April 1990	15 February 2015	found in Roman Martyrology (added on 11 May 2023 by Pope Francis)	Coptic Orthodox, one of the 21 Coptic Christian Martyrs of Libya
Estêvão Machado de Miranda	unknown	3 October 1645	15 October 2017 by Pope Francis	One of the Martyrs of Natal
Etienne-Théodore Cuenot, MEP	8 February 1802	14 November 1861	19 June 1988 by Pope John Paul II	One of the Vietnamese Martyrs
Eucherius of Lyon	c. 380	c. 449		
Eudokia of Heliopolis	0s	107	found in Roman Martyrology	
Eugendus	c. 449	1 January 510	found in Roman Martyrology	
Eugène de Mazenod	1 August 1782	21 May 1861	3 December 1995 by Pope John Paul II	
Eugénie d'Alsace	unknown	735		
Eugenius II of Toledo	unknown	13 November 657	found in Roman Martyrology	
Eulalia of Mérida	c. 290	10 December 304		
Eulogius of Córdoba	c. 800	11 March 859	found in Roman Martyrology	One of the Martyrs of Córdoba
Euphemia	200s	303		
Euphrasia Eluvathingal	17 October 1877	29 August 1952	23 November 2014 by Pope Francis	
Euphrasia of the Immaculate Conception Brard	12 May 1736	17 July 1794	18 December 2024 by Pope Francis	One of the Martyrs of Compiègne
Euphrosyne of Alexandria	unknown	400s	found in Roman Martyrology	
Euprepius of Verona	0s	unknown	found in Roman Martyrology	
Pope Eusebius	3rd century	17 Aug 310	found in Roman Martyrology	
Eusebius of Rome	4th century	357	found in Roman Martyrology	
Eusebius of Vercelli	c. 2 March 283	1 August 371	found in Roman Martyrology	
Eustace	0s	118	found in Roman Martyrology	Martyr and soldier
Eustace White	1559	10 December 1591	25 October 1970 by Pope Paul VI	One of the Forty Martyrs of England and Wales
Eustachius	unknown	c. 250	18 December 1884 (equipollent) by Pope Leo XIII	Bishop of Naples
Eustathius of Antioch	200s	c. 360	found in Roman Martyrology	
Eustochia Smeralda Calafato	25 March 1434	20 January 1485	11 June 1988 by Pope John Paul II	
Eutropius of Orange	unknown	27 May 475	found in Roman Martyrology	
Evellius	unknown	66 AD	found in Roman Martyrology	
Evodius	unknown	c. 66 AD	found in Roman Martyrology	
Exuperius	unknown	127	found in Roman Martyrology	
Ezequiél Moreno y Díaz	9 April 1848	19 August 1906	11 October 1992 by Pope John Paul II	
Ezzat Bushra Nassif	14 August 1982	15 February 2015	found in Roman Martyrology (added on 11 May 2023 by Pope Francis)	Coptic Orthodox, one of the 21 Coptic Christian Martyrs of Libya
Fabiola	300s	27 December 399		
Fabius	200s	303 or 304		
Falco of Palena	mid 1100s	1200s	2 July 1893 (equipollent) by Pope Leo XIII	
Fanchea	500s	c. 585		
Fandilas of Córdoba	unknown	13 June 853	found in Roman Martyrology	One of the Martyrs of Córdoba
Faustina Kowalska	25 August 1905	5 October 1938	30 April 2000 by Pope John Paul II	
Faustinus	unknown	120	found in Roman Martyrology	
Faustinus of Rome	200s	302 or 303	found in Roman Martyrology	
Faustus of Milan	100s	190	found in Roman Martyrology	
Felician	200s	c. 297	found in Roman Martyrology	
Felicissimus	unknown	6 August 258	found in Roman Martyrology	
Felicitas of Rome	c. 101	c. 165	found in Roman Martyrology	
Felicity	100s	7 March 203	found in Roman Martyrology	See also Passion of Saint Perpetua, Saint Felicitas, and their Companions
Felicula	0s	90 AD	found in Roman Martyrology	
Felix, Regula and Exuperantius	200s	11 September 286		
Felix	200s	303		Martyred with Adauctus
Felix	200s	c. 303	found in Roman Martyrology	
Felix II	unknown	22 November 365	found in Roman Martyrology	
Felix of Alcalá	unknown	14 June 853	found in Roman Martyrology	One of the Martyrs of Córdoba
Felix of Cantalice	18 May 1515	18 May 1587	22 May 1712 by Pope Clement XI	
Felix of Córdoba	unknown	27 July 852	found in Roman Martyrology	One of the Martyrs of Córdoba
Felix of Nicosia	5 November 1715	31 May 1787	23 October 2005 by Pope Benedict XVI	Professed religious of the Franciscan Capuchins
Felix of Nola	200s	c. 250	found in Roman Martyrology	
Felix of Valois	16 April 1127	4 November 1212	1 May 1262 by Pope Urban IV	
Ferdinand III of Castile	1199 or 1201	30 May 1252	7 February 1671 (equipollent) by Pope Clement X	
Fergustus Pictus	unknown	800s	11 July 1898 (equipollent) by Pope Leo XIII	
Fidelis of Sigmaringen	1577	24 April 1622	29 June 1746 by Pope Benedict XIV	
Filippo Smaldone	27 July 1848	4 June 1923	15 October 2006 by Pope Benedict XVI	
Fillan	unknown	800s	11 July 1898 (equipollent) by Pope Leo XIII	
Finan of Lindisfarne	unknown	10 or 17 February 661	11 July 1898 (equipollent) by Pope Leo XIII	
Finbarr of Cork	550	623		
Finnian of Clonard	470	12 December 549		
Fintan of Clonenagh	c. 526	603		found in Roman Martyrology
Fintán of Taghmon	unknown	635		Bishop and hermit
Firmina	unknown	200s	found in Roman Martyrology	
Firminus of Satala	200s	304	found in Roman Martyrology	
Firmus of Satala	200s	304	found in Roman Martyrology	
Flavia Domitilla	0s	c. 96 AD	found in Roman Martyrology	
Flavius Latinus of Brescia	0s	115	found in Roman Martyrology	
Flora of Córdoba	unknown	24 November 851	found in Roman Martyrology	One of the Martyrs of Córdoba
Florentius of Vienne	unknown	c. 377	found in Roman Martyrology	Bishop of Vienne
Florian	250	c. 304		
Fortunatus of Naples	unknown	300s	15 January 1841 (equipollent) by Pope Gregory XVI	
Fortunatus of Spoleto	300s	c. 400	found in Roman Martyrology	
Franca Visalta	1170	1218	September 1273 by Pope Gregory X	
Frances of Rome	1384	9 March 1440	9 May 1608 by Pope Paul V	Married layperson of the Vicariate of Rome
Frances Xavier Cabrini	15 July 1850	22 December 1917	7 July 1946 by Pope Pius XII	First U.S. citizen to be canonized See also Elizabeth Ann Seton the first born U.S. citizen to be canonized.
Francesco Fogolla	4 October 1839	9 July 1900	1 October 2000 by Pope John Paul II	One of the Martyr Saints of China
Francesco Maria da Camporosso	27 December 1804	17 September 1866	9 December 1962 by Pope John XXIII	
Francesco Spinelli	14 April 1853	6 February 1913	14 October 2018 by Pope Francis	
Francis Borgia	28 October 1510	30 September 1572	20 June 1670 by Pope Clement X	
Francis Caracciolo	13 October 1563	4 June 1608	24 May 1807 by Pope Pius VII	
Francis Choe Kyonghwan	1805	12 September 1839	6 May 1984 by Pope John Paul II	One of the Korean Martyrs
Francis de Geronimo	17 December 1642	11 May 1716	26 May 1839 by Pope Gregory XVI	
Francis de Sales	21 August 1567	28 December 1622	8 April 1665 by Pope Alexander VII	
Francis Diaz	2 October 1713	28 October 1748	1 October 2000 by Pope John Paul II	One of the Martyr Saints of China
Francis Đỗ Văn Chiểu	c. 1797	25 June 1838	19 June 1988 by Pope John Paul II	One of the Vietnamese Martyrs
Francis Fasani	6 August 1681	29 November 1742	13 April 1986 by Pope John Paul II	Professed priest of the Franciscan Conventuals
Francis Ferdinand de Capillas	15 August 1607	15 January 1648	1 October 2000 by Pope John Paul II	One of the Martyr Saints of China
Francis Gil de Frederich	14 December 1702	22 January 1745	19 June 1988 by Pope John Paul II	One of the Vietnamese Martyrs
Francis Hà Trọng Mậu	c. 1790	19 December 1839	19 June 1988 by Pope John Paul II	One of the Vietnamese Martyrs
Francis Jaccard, MEP	6 September 1799	21 September 1838	19 June 1988 by Pope John Paul II	One of the Vietnamese Martyrs
Francis Kichi	1500s	5 February 1597	8 June 1862 by Pope Pius IX	One of the 26 Martyrs of Japan
Francis Massabki	1800s	10 July 1860	20 October 2024 by Pope Francis	
Francis Nguyễn Cần	c. 1803	20 November 1837	19 June 1988 by Pope John Paul II	One of the Vietnamese Martyrs
Francis of Assisi	1181 or 1182	3 October 1226	16 July 1228 by Pope Gregory IX	Italian Roman Catholic friar and preacher
Francis of Nagasaki	1548	5 February 1597	8 June 1862 by Pope Pius IX	One of the 26 Martyrs of Japan
Francis of Paola	27 March 1416	2 April 1507	1 May 1519 by Pope Leo X	
Francis of Roye	1549	9 July 1572	29 June 1867 by Pope Pius IX	One of the Martyrs of Gorkum
Francis of Saint Michael	c. 1544	5 February 1597	8 June 1862 by Pope Pius IX	One of the 26 Martyrs of Japan
Francis Regis Clet	19 August 1748	18 February 1820	1 October 2000 by Pope John Paul II	One of the Martyr Saints of China
Francis Serrano	4 December 1695	28 October 1748	1 October 2000 by Pope John Paul II	One of the Martyr Saints of China
Francis Shoyemon	1500s or 1600s	14 August 1633	18 October 1987 by Pope John Paul II	One of the 16 Martyrs of Japan
Francis Solanus	10 March 1549	14 July 1610	27 December 1726 by Pope Benedict XIII	
Francis Trần Văn Trung	c. 1825	6 October 1858	19 June 1988 by Pope John Paul II	One of the Vietnamese Martyrs
Francis Xavier	7 April 1506	2 December 1552	12 March 1622 by Pope Gregory XV	
Francis Xavier Bianchi	2 December 1743	31 January 1815	21 October 1951 by Pope Pius XII	Professed priest of the Barnabites
Francis Xavier Vérolot	13 January 1764	17 July 1794	18 December 2024 by Pope Francis	One of the Martyrs of Compiègne
Francis Zhang Rong	c. 1838	9 July 1900	1 October 2000 by Pope John Paul II	One of the Martyr Saints of China
Francisco Blanco	c. 1570	5 February 1597	8 June 1862 by Pope Pius IX	One of the 26 Martyrs of Japan
Francisco Coll Guitart	18 May 1812	2 April 1875	11 October 2009 Pope Benedict XVI	
Francisco de Bastos	unknown	3 October 1645	15 October 2017 by Pope Francis	One of the Martyrs of Natal
Francisco Marto	11 June 1908	4 April 1919	13 May 2017 by Pope Francis	
Francisco Mendes Pereira	unknown	3 October 1645	15 October 2017 by Pope Francis	One of the Martyrs of Natal
Francisco Pinazo Peñalver	26 August 1802	10 July 1860	20 October 2024 by Pope Francis	
François de Laval	30 April 1623	6 May 1708	3 April 2014 (equipollent) by Pope Francis	first Bishop of Quebec
François-Isidore Gagelin	10 May 1799	17 October 1833	19 June 1988 by Pope John Paul II	One of the Vietnamese Martyrs
Fridolin of Säckingen	500s	600s		
Fructuosus	unknown	259	found in Roman Martyrology	
Frumentius	300s	c. 383	found in Roman Martyrology	
Fulgentius of Cartagena	500s	c. 630		
Fulgentius of Ruspe	c. 465	1 January 527 or 533	found in Roman Martyrology	
Fursey	c. 597	650		
Gabriel de Duisco	c. 1578	5 February 1597	8 June 1862 by Pope Pius IX	One of the 26 Martyrs of Japan
Gabriel Lalemant	3 October 1610	17 March 1649	29 June 1930 by Pope Pius XI	One of the Canadian Martyrs
Gabriel of Our Lady of Sorrows	1 March 1838	27 February 1862	13 May 1920 by Pope Benedict XV	
Gabriel-Taurin Dufresse	8 December 1750	14 September 1815	1 October 2000 by Pope John Paul II	One of the Martyr Saints of China
Gaetano Catanoso	14 February 1879	4 April 1963	23 October 2005 by Pope Benedict XVI	
Gaetano Errico	19 October 1791	29 October 1860	12 October 2008 by Pope Benedict XVI	
Galgano Guidotti	1148	3 December 1181	1185 by Pope Lucius III	
Gall	550	646		
Gamaliel	unknown	unknown	found in Roman Martyrology	
Gaspar del Bufalo	6 January 1786	28 December 1837	12 June 1954 by Pope Pius XII	Priest of the Vicariate of Rome; founder of the Missionaries of the Precious Blood
Gaspare Bertoni	9 October 1777	12 June 1853	1 November 1989 by Pope John Paul II	Priest of the Diocese of Verona; founder of the Congregation of the Holy Stigmata (Stigmatines)
Gaucherius	1060	1140	1194 by Pope Clement III	
Gaudentius of Rimini	unknown	14 October 360	found in Roman Martyrology	
Gaudiosus of Tarazona	400s	c. 540		
Gebhard of Constance	949	995		
Gelasius of Fossombrone	unknown	200s	found in Roman Martyrology	
Geltrude Comensoli	18 January 1847	18 February 1903	26 April 2009 by Benedict XVI	
Geminianus	300s	300s	found in Roman Martyrology	Bishop of Modena
Geminus of Fossombrone	unknown	200s	found in Roman Martyrology	
Gemma Galgani	12 March 1878	11 April 1903	2 May 1940 by Pope Pius XII	
Gemma of Goriano Sicoli	1375 or 1385	13 May 1439	28 April 1890 (equipollent) by Pope Leo XIII	
Genesius of Arles	200s	303 or 308	found in Roman Martyrology	
Genesius of Rome	200s	303	found in Roman Martyrology	
Genevieve	419–422	502–512	found in Roman Martyrology	
Genoveva Torres Morales	3 January 1870	5 January 1956	4 May 2003 by Pope John Paul II	
George	200s	23 April 303	found in Roman Martyrology	
George of Córdoba	unknown	27 July 852	found in Roman Martyrology	One of the Martyrs of Córdoba
George Preca	12 February 1880	26 July 1962	3 June 2007 by Pope Benedict XVI	
Gerald of Sauve-Majeure	1025	1095	27 April 1197 by Pope Celestine III	
Gerard Majella	6 April 1726	16 October 1755	11 December 1904 by Pope Pius X	
Gerard of Csanád	23 April 977/1000	29 August 1046	1083 by Pope Gregory VII	
Gerard of Lunel	c. 1275	1298	1 August 1742 (equipollent) by Pope Benedict XIV	
Gerard of Potenza	unknown	30 October 1119	1119 by Pope Callixtus II	
Gerard of Toul	935	23 April 994	21 October 1050 by Pope Leo IX	
Gerges Samir Megally	1 October 1991	15 February 2015	found in Roman Martyrology (added on 11 May 2023 by Pope Francis)	Coptic Orthodox, one of the 21 Coptic Christian Martyrs of Libya
Germain of Paris	c. 496	28 May 576	found in Roman Martyrology	Bishop of Paris
Germain of Talloires	900s	1018	9 May 1889 (equipollent) by Pope Leo XIII	
Germaine Cousin	1579	1601	29 June 1867 by Pope Pius IX	
Germanicus of Smyrna	100s	155	found in Roman Martyrology	Martyr
Gerolamo Emiliani	1486	8 February 1537	16 July 1767 by Pope Clement XIII	
Gertrude of Nivelles	c. 628	17 March 659	found in Roman Martyrology	
Gertrude the Great	6 January 1256	c. 1302 17 November	1677 (equipollent) by Pope Innocent XI	
Getulius	unknown	120	found in Roman Martyrology	
Gherardino Sostegni	1200s	1200s	15 January 1888 by Pope Leo XIII	One of the Seven Holy Founders of the Servite Order
Gianna Beretta Molla	4 October 1922	28 April 1962	16 May 2004 by Pope John Paul II	
Gilbert of Neuffontaines	unknown	5 June 1152	22 January 1728 (equipollent) by Pope Benedict XIII	
Gilbert of Sempringham	c. 1085	4 February 1189 or 1190	1202 by Pope Innocent III	
Giles	c. 650	c. 710	found in Roman Martyrology	
Giordano Ansaloni	1 November 1598	17 November 1634	18 October 1987 by Pope John Paul II	One of the 16 Martyrs of Japan
Giovanni Antonio Farina	11 January 1803	4 March 1888	23 November 2014 by Pope Francis	
Giovanni Battista de' Rossi	22 February 1698	23 May 1764	8 December 1881 by Pope Leo XIII	
Giovanni Battista Piamarta	26 November 1841	25 April 1913	21 October 2012 by Pope Benedict XVI	
Giovanni Battista Scalabrini	08 July 1839	01 June 1905	9 October 2022 by Pope Francis	
Giovanni Calabria	8 October 1873	4 December 1954	18 April 1999 by Pope John Paul II	
Giovanni Leonardi	1541	9 October 1609	17 April 1938 by Pope Pius XI	Priest and founder of the Clerics Regular of the Mother of God
Girgis Melad Sniout	17 December 1992	15 February 2015	found in Roman Martyrology (added on 11 May 2023 by Pope Francis)	Coptic Orthodox, one of the 21 Coptic Christian Martyrs of Libya
Giuditta Vannini	7 July 1859	23 February 1911	13 October 2019 by Pope Francis	
Giulia Salzano	13 October 1846	17 May 1929	17 October 2010 by Pope Benedict XVI	
Giuseppe Allamano	21 January 1851	16 February 1926	20 October 2024 by Pope Francis	
Giuseppe Benedetto Cottolengo	3 May 1786	30 April 1842	19 March 1934 by Pope Pius XI	Founder of the Little House of Divine Providence. Priest of the Archdiocese of Turin; founder of the Sisters of Saint Joseph Benedict Cottolengo, the Brothers of Saint Joseph Benedict Cottolengo and the Society of Priests of Saint Joseph Benedict Cottolengo
Giuseppe Maria Tomasi	12 September 1649	1 January 1713	12 October 1986 by Pope John Paul II	Professed priest of the Theatines; cardinal
Giuseppe Moscati	25 July 1880	12 April 1927	25 October 1987 by Pope John Paul II	
Giustino de Jacobis	9 October 1800	31 July 1860	26 October 1975 by Pope Paul VI	
Giustino Russolillo	18 January 1891	2 August 1955	15 May 2022 by Pope Francis	
Gleb	987	1015		
Glyceria	100s	177	found in Roman Martyrology	
Gobnait	400s to 500s	400s to 500s		
Godelieve of Gistel	c. 1049	6 July 1070	1084 by Pope Urban II	
Godfrey of Cappenberg	1096 or 1097	13 January 1127	8 March 1728 (equipollent) by Pope Benedict XIII	
Godfried Coart	1512	9 July 1572	29 June 1867 by Pope Pius IX	One of the Martyrs of Gorkum
Godfried van Duynen	1502	9 July 1572	29 June 1867 by Pope Pius IX	One of the Martyrs of Gorkum
Gonsalo Garcia	6 February 1557	5 February 1597	8 June 1862 by Pope Pius IX	One of the 26 Martyrs of Japan, first Indian to become a saint
Gonzaga Gonza	1800s	27 May 1886	18 October 1964 by Pope Paul VI	One of the Uganda Martyrs
Gordianus	unknown	362	found in Roman Martyrology	
Gordius of Caesarea	200s	c. 310	found in Roman Martyrology	
Gorgonia	300s	23 February 375	found in Roman Martyrology	
Gorgonius of Rome	unknown	unknown	found in Roman Martyrology	
Gotthard of Hildesheim	960	4 May 1038	1131 by Pope Innocent II	
Greca	12 October 284	21 January 304		
Gregorio Barbarigo	16 September 1625	18 June 1697	26 May 1960 by Pope John XXIII	Bishop of Padua; cardinal
Gregorio Grassi	13 December 1833	9 July 1900	1 October 2000 by Pope John Paul II	One of the Martyr Saints of China
Gregory of Langres	c. 446	539	found in Roman Martyrology	
Gregory of Narek	945–951	1003–1011	12 April 2015 by Pope Francis	
Gregory of Nazianzus	329	25 January 390	found in Roman Martyrology	
Gregory of Nyssa	c. 335	c. 395	found in Roman Martyrology	
Gregory Thaumaturgus	c. 213	c. 270	found in Roman Martyrology	
Gregory the Illuminator	c. 257	c. 331	found in Roman Martyrology	
Guarinus of Palestrina	c. 1080	6 February 1158	1159 by Pope Alexander III	
Guido of Acqui	c. 1004	2 June 1070	22 September 1853 (equipollent) by Pope Pius IX	
Guido Maria Conforti	30 March 1865	5 November 1931	23 October 2011 by Pope Benedict XVI	
Guillaume Courtet	c. 1590	29 September 1637	18 October 1987 by Pope John Paul II	One of the 16 Martyrs of Japan
Gumesindus of Córdoba	unknown	13 January 852	found in Roman Martyrology	One of the Martyrs of Córdoba
Gummarus	c. 717	774		Saint of the Belgian town Lier
Gyavira Musoke	1800s	3 June 1886	18 October 1964 by Pope Paul VI	One of the Uganda Martyrs
Habentius of Córdoba	unknown	7 June 851	found in Roman Martyrology	One of the Martyrs of Córdoba
Hany Abdel-Masih Salib	1 January 1982	15 February 2015	found in Roman Martyrology (added on 11 May 2023 by Pope Francis)	Coptic Orthodox, one of the 21 Coptic Christian Martyrs of Libya
Héctor Valdivielso Sáez	31 October 1910	9 October 1934	21 November 1999 by Pope John Paul II	First Argentine saint. One of the Martyrs of Turon. Also known as Saint Benito de Jesus.
Hedwig of Silesia	1174	15 October 1243	26 March 1267 by Pope Clement IV	
Hegesippus	110	7 April 180	found in Roman Martyrology	
Helena of Constantinople	c. 246 or 248	c. 330	found in Roman Martyrology	
Helena of Skövde	c. 1101	1160	1164 by Pope Alexander III	
Heliodorus of Altino	300s	c. 390	found in Roman Martyrology	
Hemma of Gurk	c. 995	27 June 1045	5 January 1938 by Pope Pius XI	
Henriette of Jesus de Croissy	18 June 1745	17 July 1794	18 December 2024 by Pope Francis	One of the Martyrs of Compiègne
Henry II	6 May 973	13 July 1024	July 1147 by Pope Eugene III	Emperor of Burgundy and Bavaria
Henry Morse	1595	1 February 1645	25 October 1970 by Pope Paul VI	One of the Forty Martyrs of England and Wales
Henry of Uppsala	unknown	20 January 1156		
Henry Walpole	1558	7 April 1595	25 October 1970 by Pope Paul VI	One of the Forty Martyrs of England and Wales
Herculanils	100s	180		
Heribert of Cologne	c. 970	16 March 1021	c. 1075 by Pope Gregory VII	
Hermann Joseph	c. 1150	7 April 1241	11 August 1958 by Pope Pius XII	
Hermenegild	500s	13 April 585	found in Roman Martyrology	
Hermes	unknown	120	found in Roman Martyrology	
Hermias	100s	160	found in Roman Martyrology	
Hermione of Ephesus	unknown	117		
Hilarian of Espalion	c. 760	c. 793	10 May 1883 (equipollent) by Pope Leo XIII	
Hilarion	291	371	found in Roman Martyrology	
Hilary of Poitiers	c. 310	c. 367	found in Roman Martyrology	
Hildegard of Bingen	1098	17 September 1179	10 May 2012 by Pope Benedict XVI	Professed religious of the Benedictine Nuns, Doctor of the Church in 2012
Hippolytus of Rome	c. 170	c. 235	found in Roman Martyrology	
Homobonus	1100s	13 November 1197	12 January 1199 by Pope Innocent III	
Honorina	200s	c. 303		
Honorius of Canterbury	500s	30 September 653	found in Roman Martyrology	
Hripsime	3rd century	290s	found in Roman Martyrology	
Hubertus	656–658	30 May 727		
Hugh dei Lippi Uggucioni	1200s	3 May 1282	15 January 1888 by Pope Leo XIII	One of the Seven Holy Founders of the Servite Order
Hugh of Châteauneuf	1053	1 April 1132	22 April 1134 by Pope Innocent II	
Hugh of Cluny	1024	28 April 1109	6 January 1120 by Pope Callixtus II	
Hugh of Lincoln	1135–1140	16 November 1200	17 February 1220 by Pope Honorius III	
Humilis of Bisignano	26 August 1582	26 November 1637	19 May 2002 by Pope John Paul II	
Humility	c. 1226	22 May 1310	27 January 1720 (equipollent) by Pope Clement XI	
Hyacinth of Rome	200s	c. 257–259	found in Roman Martyrology	
Hyacinth of Caesarea	96 AD	108	found in Roman Martyrology	
Hyacinth of Poland	c. 1185	15 August 1257	17 April 1594 by Pope Clement VIII	
Hyacintha Mariscotti	16 March 1585	30 January 1640	14 May 1807 by Pope Pius VII	
Hypatius of Gangra	200s	c. 325		
Ia of Cornwall	unknown	450		
Ignatius Kim Chejun	1796	26 September 1839	6 May 1984 by Pope John Paul II	One of the Korean Martyrs
Ignatius of Antioch	c. 50 AD	c. 108 AD	found in Roman Martyrology	
Ignatius of Laconi	10 December 1701	11 May 1781	21 October 1951 by Pope Pius XII	Professed religious of the Franciscan Capuchins
Ignatius of Loyola	c. 23 October 1491	31 July 1556	12 March 1622 by Pope Gregory XV	Founded the Society of Jesus (Jesuits)
Ignatius of Santhià	5 June 1686	22 September 1770	19 May 2002 by Pope John Paul II	Professed priest of the Franciscan Capuchins
Ignazia Verzeri	31 July 1801	3 March 1852	10 June 2001 by Pope John Paul II	Founder of the Daughters of the Sacred Heart of Jesus
Ildefonsus	607	23 January 667		
Inocencio of Mary Immaculate	10 March 1887	9 October 1934	21 November 1999 by Pope John Paul II	One of the Martyrs of Turon
Íñigo of Oña	unknown	1 June 1057	18 June 1259 by Pope Alexander IV	
Ioannes Baptista Wu Mantang	c. 1883	29 June 1900	1 October 2000 by Pope John Paul II	One of the Martyr Saints of China
Ioannes Baptista Zhu Wurui	c. 1883	19 July 1900	1 October 2000 by Pope John Paul II	One of the Martyr Saints of China
Irenaeus	c. 130	c. 202	found in Roman Martyrology	
Irene of Rome	200s	288		
Irene of Tomar	c. 635	c. 653		
Dulce de Souza Lopes Pontes	26 May 1914	13 March 1992	13 October 2019 by Pope Francis	Also known as "Dulce of the Poor"
Isaac Jogues	10 January 1607	18 October 1646	29 June 1930 by Pope Pius XI	One of the Canadian Martyrs
Isaac of Armenia	354	439–441		
Isaac of Córdoba	c. 824	3 June 851	found in Roman Martyrology	One of the Martyrs of Córdoba
Isaac of Dalmatia	unknown	30 May 383		
Isaac of Nineveh	c. 613	c. 700		
Isidora	300s	before 365		
Isidore of Córdoba	unknown	17 April 856	found in Roman Martyrology	One of the Martyrs of Córdoba
Isidore of Seville	c. 556	4 April 636	found in Roman Martyrology	Archbishop of Seville, Doctor of the Church
Isidore the Laborer	c. 1070	15 May 1130	12 March 1622 by Pope Gregory XV	
Íte of Killeedy	c. 480	15 January 570		
Ivo of Chartres	1040	23 December 1115	found in Roman Martyrology	
Ivo of Kermartin	17 October 1253	19 May 1303	June 1347 by Pope Clement VI	
Jaber Mounir Adly	25 January 1992	15 February 2015	found in Roman Martyrology (added on 11 May 2023 by Pope Francis)	Coptic Orthodox, one of the 21 Coptic Christian Martyrs of Libya
Jacinta Marto	11 March 1910	20 February 1920	13 May 2017 by Pope Francis	
Jacinto Casteñeda, OP	13 November 1743	7 November 1773	19 June 1988 by Pope John Paul II	One of the Vietnamese Martyrs
Jacob of Nisibis	200s	337 or 338		
Jacob of Serugh	c. 451	29 November 521		
Jacobo Kyushei Tomonaga	c.1582	17 August 1633	18 October 1987 by Pope John Paul II	One of the 16 Martyrs of Japan
Jacques Berthieu	27 November 1838	8 June 1896	21 October 2012 by Pope Benedict XVI	
Jacques-Honoré Chastan	6 October 1803	21 September 1839	6 May 1984 by Pope John Paul II	One of the Korean Martyrs
Jadwiga of Poland	3 October 1373–18 February 1374	17 July 1399	8 June 1997 by Pope John Paul II	
Jaime Hilario Barbal	2 January 1898	18 January 1937	21 November 1999 by Pope John Paul II	
James Buuzaabalyaawo	1800s	3 June 1886	18 October 1964 by Pope Paul VI	One of the Uganda Martyrs
James Kisai	1533	5 February 1597	8 June 1862 by Pope Pius IX	One of the 26 Martyrs of Japan
James Lacobs	1541	9 July 1572	29 June 1867 by Pope Pius IX	One of the Martyrs of Gorkum
James Năm	c. 1781	12 August 1838	19 June 1988 by Pope John Paul II	One of the Vietnamese Martyrs
James of the Marches	c. 1391	28 November 1476	10 December 1726 by Pope Benedict XIII	
James the Greater	c. 3 AD	44 AD	found in Roman Martyrology	
James the Just	unknown	62 or 69 AD	found in Roman Martyrology	
James the Less	1st century BC	c. 62 AD	found in Roman Martyrology	
James Yan Guodong	c. 1854	9 July 1900	1 October 2000 by Pope John Paul II	One of the Martyr Saints of China
James Zhao Quanxin	c. 1857	9 July 1900	1 October 2000 by Pope John Paul II	One of the Martyr Saints of China
Jan of Oisterwijk	1504	9 July 1572	29 June 1867 by Pope Pius IX	One of the Martyrs of Gorkum
Jan Sarkander	20 December 1576	17 March 1620	21 May 1995 by Pope John Paul II	
Jane Frances de Chantal	28 January 1572	13 December 1641	16 July 1767 by Pope Clement XIII	
Januarius	200s	c. 305	found in Roman Martyrology	Bishop of Benevento
Jason of Thessalonica	0s BC	0s	found in Roman Martyrology	
Jean de Brébeuf	25 March 1593	16 March 1649	29 June 1930 by Pope Pius XI	One of the Canadian Martyrs
Jean de Lalande	unknown	19 October 1646	29 June 1930 by Pope Pius XI	One of the Canadian Martyrs
Jean-Baptiste de La Salle	30 April 1651	7 April 1719	24 May 1900 by Pope Leo XIII	
Jean-Charles Cornay	27 February 1809	20 September 1837	19 June 1988 by Pope John Paul II	One of the Vietnamese Martyrs
Jean-Louis Bonnard, MEP	1 March 1824	1 May 1852	19 June 1988 by Pope John Paul II	One of the Vietnamese Martyrs
Jean-Pierre Néel	18 October 1832	18 February 1862	1 October 2000 by Pope John Paul II	One of the Martyr Saints of China
Jeanne de Lestonnac	27 December 1556	2 February 1640	15 May 1949 by Pope Pius XII	Widow; founder of the Sisters of the Company of Mary
Jeanne Delanoue	18 June 1666	17 August 1736	31 October 1982 by Pope John Paul II	Founder of the Servants of the Poor
Jeanne Jugan	25 October 1792	29 August 1879	11 October 2009 by Pope Benedict XVI	
Jeanne-Antide Thouret	27 November 1765	24 August 1826	14 January 1934 by Pope Pius XI	Founder of the Sisters of Charity of Saint Joan Antida Thouret
Jenaro Sánchez Delgadillo	19 September 1886	17 January 1927	21 May 2000 by Pope John Paul II	One of the Saints of the Cristero War
Jeremiah of Córdoba	unknown	15 September 852	found in Roman Martyrology	One of the Martyrs of Córdoba
Jeremiah of Tábanos	unknown	7 June 851	found in Roman Martyrology	One of the Martyrs of Córdoba
Jerome	c. 347	30 September 420	found in Roman Martyrology	Translated the Vulgate
Jerome Lu Tingmei	c. 1811	28 January 1858	1 October 2000 by Pope John Paul II	One of the Martyr Saints of China
Jerome of Pavia	unknown	770	20 December 1888 (equipollent) by Pope Leo XIII	
Jerome of Weert	1522	9 July 1572	29 June 1867 by Pope Pius IX	One of the Martyrs of Gorkum
Jeronimo Hermosilla	30 September 1800	1 November 1861	19 June 1988 by Pope John Paul II	One of the Vietnamese Martyrs
Jesús Méndez Montoya	10 June 1880	5 February 1928	21 May 2000 by Pope John Paul II	One of the Saints of the Cristero War
Joachim	c. 50 BC	15 AD	found in Roman Martyrology	
Joachim Ho	c. 1782	9 July 1839	1 October 2000 by Pope John Paul II	One of the Martyr Saints of China
Joachim Royo	September 1691	28 October 1748	1 October 2000 by Pope John Paul II	One of the Martyr Saints of China
Joachim Sakakibara	1556	5 February 1597	8 June 1862 by Pope Pius IX	One of the 26 Martyrs of Japan
Joan Elizabeth Bichier des Âges	5 July 1773	26 August 1838	6 July 1947 by Pope Pius XII	Cofounder of the Sisters of the Cross
Joan of Arc	1412	30 May 1431	16 May 1920 by Pope Benedict XV	French heroine and martyr
Joan of France	23 April 1464	4 February 1505	28 May 1950 by Pope Pius XII	
Joan Wu Wenyin	c. 1850	8 July 1900	1 October 2000 by Pope John Paul II	One of the Martyr Saints of China
João da Silveira	unknown	3 October 1645	15 October 2017 by Pope Francis	One of the Martyrs of Natal
João Lostau Navarro	c. 1578	3 October 1645	15 October 2017 by Pope Francis	One of the Martyrs of Natal
João Martins	1600s	3 October 1645	15 October 2017 by Pope Francis	One of the Martyrs of Natal
Joaquina Vedruna de Mas	16 April 1783	28 August 1854	12 April 1959 by Pope John XXIII	
Johannes Pak Hujae	1799	3 September 1839	6 May 1984 by Pope John Paul II	One of the Korean Martyrs
Johannes Yi Munu	1810	1 February 1840	6 May 1984 by Pope John Paul II	One of the Korean Martyrs
John Alcober	31 December 1694	25 October 1748	1 October 2000 by Pope John Paul II	One of the Martyr Saints of China
John Almond	c. 1577	5 December 1612	25 October 1970 by Pope Paul VI	One of the Forty Martyrs of England and Wales
John Baptist Chon Changun	1811	9 March 1866	6 May 1984 by Pope John Paul II	One of the Korean Martyrs
John Baptist Cỏn	c. 1805	8 November 1840	19 June 1988 by Pope John Paul II	One of the Vietnamese Martyrs
John Baptist Luo Tingyin	c. 1825	29 July 1861	1 October 2000 by Pope John Paul II	One of the Martyr Saints of China
John Baptist Nam Chongsam	1817	7 March 1866	6 May 1984 by Pope John Paul II	One of the Korean Martyrs
John Baptist Yi	1795	20 July 1839	6 May 1984 by Pope John Paul II	One of the Korean Martyrs
John Baptist Zhao Mingxi	c. 1844	3 July 1900	1 October 2000 by Pope John Paul II	One of the Martyr Saints of China
John Berchmans	13 March 1599	13 August 1621	15 January 1888 by Pope Leo XIII	
John Bosco	16 August 1815	31 January 1888	1 April 1934 by Pope Pius XI	
John Boste	1544	24 July 1594	25 October 1970 by Pope Paul VI	One of the Forty Martyrs of England and Wales
John Buonagiunta Monetti	1200s	1256	15 January 1888 by Pope Leo XIII	One of the Seven Holy Founders of the Servite Order
John Cantius	23 June 1390	24 December 1473	16 July 1767 by Pope Clement XIII	
John Cassian	c. 360	c. 435		
John Chen Xianheng	c. 1820	18 February 1862	1 October 2000 by Pope John Paul II	One of the Martyr Saints of China
John Chrysostom	c. 349	14 September 407	found in Roman Martyrology	
John Đạt	c. 1765	28 October 1798	19 June 1988 by Pope John Paul II	One of the Vietnamese Martyrs
John de Britto	1 March 1647	4 February 1693	22 June 1947 by Pope Pius XII	
John Đinh Văn Thanh	c. 1796	28 April 1840	19 June 1988 by Pope John Paul II	One of the Vietnamese Martyrs
John Đoàn Trinh Hoan	c. 1798	26 May 1861	19 June 1988 by Pope John Paul II	One of the Vietnamese Martyrs
John Eudes	14 November 1601	19 August 1680	31 May 1925 by Pope Pius XI	
John Fisher	c. 19 October 1469	22 June 1535	19 May 1935 by Pope Pius XI	
John Francis Regis	31 January 1597	31 December 1640	5 April 1737 by Pope Clement XII	
John Gabriel Perboyre	6 January 1802	11 September 1840	2 June 1996 by Pope John Paul II	
John Gualbert	c. 985	12 July 1073	24 October 1193 by Pope Celestine III	
John Henry Newman	21 February 1801	11 August 1890	13 October 2019 by Pope Francis	
John Houghton	c. 1487	4 May 1535	25 October 1970 by Pope Paul VI	One of the Forty Martyrs of England and Wales
John Jones	1559	12 July 1598	25 October 1970 by Pope Paul VI	One of the Forty Martyrs of England and Wales
John Joseph of the Cross	15 August 1654	5 March 1739	26 May 1839 by Pope Gregory XVI	
John Kemble	1599	22 August 1679	25 October 1970 by Pope Paul VI	One of the Forty Martyrs of England and Wales
John Kisaka	1500s	5 February 1597	8 June 1862 by Pope Pius IX	One of the 26 Martyrs of Japan
John Lloyd	1500s	22 July 1679	25 October 1970 by Pope Paul VI	One of the Forty Martyrs of England and Wales
John Macias	2 March 1585	16 September 1645	28 September 1975 by Pope Paul VI	Professed religious of the Dominicans
John Maria Muzeeyi	1800s	27 January 1887	18 October 1964 by Pope Paul VI	One of the Uganda Martyrs
John Maron	628	707		First Maronite patriarch
John Neumann	28 March 1811	5 January 1860	19 June 1977 by Pope Paul VI	
John of Ávila	6 January 1499	10 May 1569	31 May 1970 by Pope Paul VI	
John of Beverley	unknown	7 May 721	1037 by Pope Benedict IX	
John of Capistrano	24 June 1386	23 October 1456	16 October 1690 by Pope Alexander VIII or 1724 by Pope Benedict XIII	
John of Cologne	1500s	9 July 1572	29 June 1867 by Pope Pius IX	One of the Martyrs of Gorkum
John of Damascus	675 or 676	4 December 749	found in Roman Martyrology	
John of Dukla	1414	1484	10 June 1997 by Pope John Paul II	
John of God	8 March 1495	8 March 1550	16 October 1690 by Pope Alexander VIII	
John of Matha	23 June 1160	17 December 1213	21 October 1666 (cultus confirmed) by Pope Alexander VII	
John of Meda	1100	26 September 1159	c. 1170 by Pope Alexander III	
John of Nepomuk	c. 1345	20 March 1393	19 March 1729 by Pope Benedict XIII	
John of Rome	200s	304	found in Roman Martyrology	
John of Sahagún	24 June 1419	11 June 1479	16 October 1690 by Pope Alexander VIII	
John of Triora	15 March 1760	7 February 1816	1 October 2000 by Pope John Paul II	One of the Martyr Saints of China
John of Trogir	c. 1034	c. 1111	found in Roman Martyrology	
John of Tufara	1084	14 November 1170	28 August 1221 by elevatio et translatio corporis officiato	
John of the Cross	1542	14 December 1591	27 December 1726 by Pope Benedict XIII	
John Ogilvie	1579	10 March 1615	17 October 1976 by Pope Paul VI	
John Payne	1532	2 April 1582	25 October 1970 by Pope Paul VI	One of the Forty Martyrs of England and Wales
John Plessington	c. 1637	19 July 1679	25 October 1970 by Pope Paul VI	One of the Forty Martyrs of England and Wales
John Rigby	c. 1570	21 June 1600	25 October 1970 by Pope Paul VI	One of the Forty Martyrs of England and Wales
John Roberts	c. 1577	10 December 1610	25 October 1970 by Pope Paul VI	One of the Forty Martyrs of England and Wales
John Soan de Goto	c. 1578	5 February 1597	8 June 1862 by Pope Pius IX	One of the 26 Martyrs of Japan
John Southworth	1592	28 June 1654	25 October 1970 by Pope Paul VI	One of the Forty Martyrs of England and Wales
John Stone	1400s	c. December 1539	25 October 1970 by Pope Paul VI	One of the Forty Martyrs of England and Wales
John the Apostle	c. 6 AD	c. 100 AD	found in Roman Martyrology	
John the Baptist	1st century BC	28–36 AD	found in Roman Martyrology	
John Twenge	1320	10 October 1379	1401 by Pope Boniface IX	
John Vianney	8 May 1786	4 August 1859	31 May 1925 by Pope Pius XI	
John Wall	1620	22 August 1679	25 October 1970 by Pope Paul VI	One of the Forty Martyrs of England and Wales
John Wang Kuixin	c. 1875	14 July 1900	1 October 2000 by Pope John Paul II	One of the Martyr Saints of China
John Wang Rui	25 February 1885	9 July 1900	1 October 2000 by Pope John Paul II	One of the Martyr Saints of China
John Yi Yun-il	1823	21 January 1867	6 May 1984 by Pope John Paul II	One of the Korean Martyrs
John Zhang Huan	18 August 1882	9 July 1900	1 October 2000 by Pope John Paul II	One of the Martyr Saints of China
John Zhang Jingguang	c. 1878	9 July 1900	1 October 2000 by Pope John Paul II	One of the Martyr Saints of China
John Zhang Tianshen	c. 1805	18 February 1862	1 October 2000 by Pope John Paul II	One of the Martyr Saints of China
Jón Ögmundsson	1052	23 April 1121	1201 by Pope Innocent III	
Josaphat	unknown	unknown		
Josaphat Kuntsevych	c. 1580	12 November 1623	29 June 1867 by Pope Pius IX	
José do Porto	unknown	3 October 1645	15 October 2017 by Pope Francis	One of the Martyrs of Natal
José Fernández, OP	3 September 1775	24 July 1838	19 June 1988 by Pope John Paul II	One of the Vietnamese Martyrs
Jose Gabriel del Rosario Brochero	16 March 1840	26 January 1914	16 October 2016 by Pope Francis	
José Isabel Flores Varela	28 November 1866	21 June 1927	21 May 2000 by Pope John Paul II	One of the Saints of the Cristero War
José Maria de Yermo y Parres	10 November 1851	20 September 1904	21 May 2000 by Pope John Paul II	
José María Díaz Sanjurjo	26 October 1818	20 July 1857	19 June 1988 by Pope John Paul II	One of the Vietnamese Martyrs
José María Robles Hurtado	3 May 1888	26 June 1927	21 May 2000 by Pope John Paul II	One of the Saints of the Cristero War
José María Rubio	22 July 1864	2 May 1929	4 May 2003 by John Paul II	
José Sánchez del Río	28 March 1913	10 February 1928	16 October 2016 by Pope Francis	One of the Saints of the Cristero War
Josemaría Escrivá	9 January 1902	26 June 1975	6 October 2002 by Pope John Paul II	
Josep Manyanet i Vives	7 January 1833	17 December 1901	16 May 2004 by Pope John Paul II	
Joseph	1st century BC	0s	found in Roman Martyrology	Husband of the Blessed Virgin Mary
Joseph Cafasso	15 January 1811	23 June 1860	22 June 1947 by Pope Pius XII	
Joseph Calasanz	11 September 1557	25 August 1648	16 July 1767 by Pope Clement XIII	
Joseph Chang Chugi	1803	30 March 1866	6 May 1984 by Pope John Paul II	One of the Korean Martyrs
Joseph Chang Songjib	1786	27 May 1839	6 May 1984 by Pope John Paul II	One of the Korean Martyrs
Joseph Cho Yunho	1848	23 December 1866	6 May 1984 by Pope John Paul II	One of the Korean Martyrs
Joseph Đặng Đình Viên	c. 1787	21 August 1838	19 June 1988 by Pope John Paul II	One of the Vietnamese Martyrs
Joseph Đỗ Quang Hiển	c. 1765	9 May 1840	19 June 1988 by Pope John Paul II	One of the Vietnamese Martyrs
Joseph Freinademetz	15 April 1852	28 January 1908	5 October 2003 by Pope John Paul II	
Joseph Han Wonso	1836	13 December 1866	6 May 1984 by Pope John Paul II	One of the Korean Martyrs
Joseph Hoàng Lương Cảnh	c. 1763	5 September 1838	19 June 1988 by Pope John Paul II	One of the Vietnamese Martyrs
Joseph Im Chipek	1804	20 September 1846	6 May 1984 by Pope John Paul II	One of the Korean Martyrs
Joseph Khang Duy Nguyen	c. 1832	6 December 1861	19 June 1988 by Pope John Paul II	One of the Vietnamese Martyrs
Joseph Lê Đăng Thị	c. 1825	25 October 1860	19 June 1988 by Pope John Paul II	One of the Vietnamese Martyrs
Joseph Ma Taishun	c. 1840	26 June 1900	1 October 2000 by Pope John Paul II	One of the Martyr Saints of China
Joseph Marchand, MEP	17 August 1803	30 November 1835	19 June 1988 by Pope John Paul II	One of the Vietnamese Martyrs
Joseph Marello	26 December 1844	30 May 1895	25 November 2001 by Pope John Paul II	
Joseph Mary Gambaro	7 August 1869	7 July 1900	1 October 2000 by Pope John Paul II	One of the Martyr Saints of China
Joseph Mukasa Balikuddembe	1860	15 November 1885	18 October 1964 by Pope Paul VI	One of the Uganda Martyrs
Joseph Nguyễn Đình Nghi	c. 1793	8 November 1840	19 June 1988 by Pope John Paul II	One of the Vietnamese Martyrs
Joseph Nguyễn Đình Uyển	c. 1775	4 July 1838	19 June 1988 by Pope John Paul II	One of the Vietnamese Martyrs
Joseph Nguyễn Văn Lựu	c. 1790	2 May 1854	19 June 1988 by Pope John Paul II	One of the Vietnamese Martyrs
Joseph of Anchieta, S.J.	19 March 1534	9 June 1597	3 April 2014 by Pope Francis	
Joseph of Cupertino	17 June 1603	18 September 1663	16 July 1767 by Pope Clement XIII	
Joseph of Leonessa	1556	4 February 1612	29 June 1746 by Pope Benedict XIV	
Joseph Oriol	23 November 1650	23 March 1702	20 May 1909 by Pope Pius X	
Joseph Phạm Trọng Tả	c. 1800	13 January 1859	19 June 1988 by Pope John Paul II	One of the Vietnamese Martyrs
Joseph Pignatelli	27 December 1737	15 November 1811	12 June 1954 by Pope Pius XII	Professed priest of the Jesuits
Joseph Trần Văn Tuấn	c. 1824	7 June 1862	19 June 1988 by Pope John Paul II	One of the Vietnamese Martyrs
Joseph Tuân	c. 1821	30 April 1861	19 June 1988 by Pope John Paul II	One of the Vietnamese Martyrs
Joseph Tuc	c. 1843	1 June 1862	19 June 1988 by Pope John Paul II	One of the Vietnamese Martyrs
Joseph Wang Kuiju	c. 1863	13 July 1900	1 October 2000 by Pope John Paul II	One of the Martyr Saints of China
Joseph Wang Yumei	c. 1832	21 July 1900	1 October 2000 by Pope John Paul II	One of the Martyr Saints of China
Joseph Vaz	21 April 1651	16 January 1711	14 January 2015 by Pope Francis	Priest of the Oratorians
Joseph Volotsky	1439 or 1440	9 September 1515	1578 by Pope Gregory XIII	
Joseph Yuan	c. 1766	24 June 1817	1 October 2000 by Pope John Paul II	One of the Martyr Saints of China
Joseph Yuan Gengyin	c. 1853	late July 1900	1 October 2000 by Pope John Paul II	One of the Martyr Saints of China
Joseph Zhang Dapeng	1754	12 March 1815	1 October 2000 by Pope John Paul II	One of the Martyr Saints of China
Joseph Zhang Wenlan	c. 1831	29 July 1861	1 October 2000 by Pope John Paul II	One of the Martyr Saints of China
Josephine Bakhita	c. 1869	8 February 1947	1 October 2000 by Pope John Paul II	
Jovita	unknown	120	found in Roman Martyrology	
Józef Bilczewski	26 April 1860	20 March 1923	23 October 2005 by Pope Benedict XVI	
Józef Sebastian Pelczar	17 January 1842	28 March 1924	18 May 2003 by Pope John Paul II	
Juan de Ribera	20 March 1532	6 January 1611	12 June 1960 by Pope John XXIII	Archbishop of Valencia
Juan del Castillo	14 September 1595	17 November 1628	16 May 1988 by Pope John Paul II	
Juan Diego	1474	1548	31 July 2002 by Pope John Paul II	First Roman Catholic indigenous American saint
Juan García López-Rico	10 July 1561	14 February 1613	25 May 1975 by Pope Paul VI	
Juan Grande Román	6 March 1546	3 June 1600	2 June 1996 by Pope John Paul II	
Juan Jacob Fernández	25 July 1808	10 July 1860	20 October 2024 by Pope Francis	
Juan of Tlaxcala	c. 1516	1529	15 October 2017 by Pope Francis	One of the Child Martyrs of Tlaxcala
Judas Cyriacus	0s	133	found in Roman Martyrology	
Jude the Apostle	0s	0s	found in Roman Martyrology	Also known as Jude Thaddeus
Julia of Corsica	unknown	c. 439		
Julián Alfredo	24 December 1903	9 October 1934	21 November 1999 by Pope John Paul II	One of the Martyrs of Turon
Julian of Antioch	200s	c. 305 AD	found in Roman Martyrology	
Julian of Cuenca	c. 1127	28 January 1208	18 October 1594 by Pope Clement VIII	
Julian of Mesopotamia	unknown	300s	found in Roman Martyrology	
Julian of Sora	unknown	150	found in Roman Martyrology	
Juliana of Mataró	unknown	340	13 September 1850 (equipollent) by Pope Pius IX	
Juliana Falconieri	1270	19 June 1341	16 June 1737 by Pope Clement XII	
Juliana of Liège	1192–1193	5 April 1258	8 July 1869 (cultus confirmed) by Pope Pius IX	
Juliana of Nicomedia	c. 286	c. 304	found in Roman Martyrology	
Julie Billiart	12 July 1751	8 April 1816	22 June 1969 by Pope Paul VI	Founder of the Sisters of Notre Dame de Namur.
Julie-Louise of Jesus Chrétien de Neuville	30 December 1741	17 July 1794	18 December 2024 by Pope Francis	One of the Martyrs of Compiègne
Julio Álvarez Mendoza	20 December 1866	30 March 1927	21 May 2000 by Pope John Paul II	One of the Saints of the Cristero War
Julius of Novara	300s	401	found in Roman Martyrology	
Julius of Rome	100s	190	found in Roman Martyrology	
Junípero Serra	24 November 1713	28 August 1784	23 September 2015 by Pope Francis	Professed priest of the Franciscan Friars Minor
Justin Martyr	100	165	found in Roman Martyrology	
Justin of Chieti	unknown	200s, 300s, or 500s	found in Roman Martyrology	
Justin of Siponto	200s	c. 310		
Justina of Padua	200s	c. 304	found in Roman Martyrology	
Justino Orona Madrigal	14 April 1877	1 July 1928	21 May 2000 by Pope John Paul II	One of the Saints of the Cristero War
Justus of Urgell	400s	c. 527	found in Roman Martyrology	
Juvenal of Benevento	unknown	132	found in Roman Martyrology	
Juvenal of Narni	unknown	3 May 369 or 377	found in Roman Martyrology	
Kalliopi	200s	c. 250		
Kateri Tekakwitha	1656	17 April 1680	21 October 2012 by Pope Benedict XVI	First Native American to become a saint
Katharine Drexel	26 November 1858	3 March 1955	1 October 2000 by Pope John Paul II	
Kilian	640	8 July 689	found in Roman Martyrology	
Kim Iulitta	1784	26 September 1839	6 May 1984 by Pope John Paul II	One of the Korean Martyrs
Kinga of Poland	5 March 1234	24 July 1292	16 June 1999 by Pope John Paul II	
Kirillos Shukry Fawzy	11 November 1991	15 February 2015	found in Roman Martyrology (added on 11 May 2023 by Pope Francis)	Coptic Orthodox, one of the 21 Coptic Christian Martyrs of Libya
Kizito	1872	3 June 1886	18 October 1964 by Pope Paul VI	One of the Uganda Martyrs
Kunigunde of Rapperswil	unknown	early 300s		
Kuriakose Elias Chavara	5 February 1805	3 January 1871	23 November 2014 by Pope Francis	
Ladislaus I of Hungary	c. 1040	29 July 1095	27 June 1192 by Pope Celestine III	
Lambert of Maastricht	636	c. 705		
Lambert of Saragossa	unknown	unknown	found in Roman Martyrology	
Lanfranc Beccari	c. 1134	23 June 1198	20 December 1888 (equipollent) by Pope Leo XIII	
Largus	200s	c. 303	found in Roman Martyrology	
Laura Montoya	26 May 1874	21 October 1949	12 May 2013 by Pope Francis	
Laurent-Joseph-Marius Imbert	23 March 1796	21 September 1839	6 May 1984 by Pope John Paul II	One of the Korean Martyrs
Laurentia	200s	302	found in Roman Martyrology	
Lawrence Bai Xiaoman	c. 1821	25 February 1856	1 October 2000 by Pope John Paul II	One of the Martyr Saints of China
Lawrence Giustiniani	1 July 1381	8 January 1456	16 October 1690 by Pope Alexander VIII	
Lawrence Han Ihyong	1798	20 September 1846	6 May 1984 by Pope John Paul II	One of the Korean Martyrs
Lawrence Ngon	c. 1840	22 May 1862	19 June 1988 by Pope John Paul II	One of the Vietnamese Martyrs
Lawrence Nguyễn Văn Hưởng	c. 1802	13 February 1856	19 June 1988 by Pope John Paul II	One of the Vietnamese Martyrs
Lawrence of Brindisi	22 July 1559	22 July 1619	8 December 1881 by Pope Leo XIII	
Lawrence of Rome	31 December 225	10 August 258	found in Roman Martyrology	Martyr of Rome
Lawrence Wang Bing	c. 1802	28 January 1858	1 October 2000 by Pope John Paul II	One of the Martyr Saints of China
Lazarus of Bardiaboch	200s	27 March 326		
Lazarus of Bethany	unknown	0s	found in Roman Martyrology	
Lazarus of Kyoto	1500s or 1600s	29 September 1637	18 October 1987 by Pope John Paul II	One of the 16 Martyrs of Japan
Leander of Seville	c. 534	13 March 600 or 601		
Leo I of Cava	unknown	1079	21 December 1893 (equipollent) by Pope Leo XIII	
Leo Karasumaru	1500s	5 February 1597	8 June 1862 by Pope Pius IX	One of the 26 Martyrs of Japan
Leo of Corigliano	unknown	10 October 1227	22 January 1516 by Pope Leo X	One of the seven Franciscan martyrs of Ceuta
Leo of Montefeltro	c. 275	366		
Leoba	c. 710	28 September 782	found in Roman Martyrology	
Leocadia	200s	9 December c. 304	found in Roman Martyrology	
Leocritia of Córdoba	unknown	15 March 859	found in Roman Martyrology	One of the Martyrs of Córdoba
Lèon-Ignance Mangin, S.J.	30 July 1857	20 July 1900	1 October 2000 by Pope John Paul II	One of the Martyr Saints of China
Leonard of Noblac	400s–500s	559	found in Roman Martyrology	
Leonard of Port Maurice	20 December 1676	26 November 1751	29 June 1867 by Pope Pius IX	
Leonard van Veghel	1527	9 July 1572	29 June 1867 by Pope Pius IX	One of the Martyrs of Gorkum
Leonardo Murialdo	26 October 1828	30 March 1900	3 May 1970 by Pope Paul VI	
Leonie Aviat	16 September 1844	10 January 1914	25 November 2001 by Pope John Paul II	
Leopold III	1073	15 November 1136	6 January 1485 by Pope Innocent VIII	
Leopold Mandić	12 May 1866	30 July 1942	16 October 1983 by Pope John Paul II	
Leovigild of Córdoba	unknown	20 August 852	found in Roman Martyrology	One of the Martyrs of Córdoba
Leucius of Brindisi	100s	180	found in Roman Martyrology	
Leutfridus	600s	738	found in Roman Martyrology	
Liberalis of Treviso	300s	400		
Liberius of Ravenna	100s	c. 200	found in Roman Martyrology	Bishop of Ravenna
Libert of Saint-Trond	unknown	783		
Liborius of Le Mans	300s	396	found in Roman Martyrology	Bishop of Le Mans
Lidwina	18 April 1380	14 April 1433	14 March 1890 (equipollent) by Pope Leo XIII	
Liliosa of Córdoba	unknown	27 July 852	found in Roman Martyrology	One of the Martyrs of Córdoba
Lithifrid of Pavia	900s	900s	20 December 1888 (equipollent) by Pope Leo XIII	
Livinus	c. 580	12 November 657	found in Roman Martyrology	
Lodovico Pavoni	11 September 1784	1 April 1849	16 October 2016 by Pope Francis	Priest and founder of the Sons of Mary Immaculate (Pavonians)
Longinus	0s	0s	found in Roman Martyrology	
Longinus of Satala	200s	304	found in Roman Martyrology	
Lorcán Ua Tuathail	1128	14 November 1180	11 December 1225 by Pope Honorius III	
Lorenzo Ruiz	c. 1600	29 September 1637	18 October 1987 by Pope John Paul II	One of the 16 Martyrs of Japan
Louis Beaulieu	8 October 1840	7 March 1866	6 May 1984 by Pope John Paul II	One of the Korean Martyrs
Louis Bertrand	1 January 1526	9 October 1581	12 April 1671 by Pope Clement X	
Louis Brideau	7 December 1751	17 July 1794	18 December 2024 by Pope Francis	One of the Martyrs of Compiègne
Louis de Montfort	31 January 1673	28 April 1716	20 July 1947 by Pope Pius XII	Priest of the Archdiocese of Rennes; founder of the Company of Mary (Montfort Missionaries), the Daughters of Wisdom, and the Brothers of Saint Gabriel
Louis Ibaraki	c. 1585	5 February 1597	8 June 1862 by Pope Pius IX	One of the 26 Martyrs of Japan
Louis IX of France	25 April 1214	25 August 1270	11 July 1297 by Pope Boniface VIII	
Louis Martin	22 August 1823	29 July 1894	18 October 2015 by Pope Francis	
Louis of Córdoba	unknown	30 April 855	found in Roman Martyrology	One of the Martyrs of Córdoba
Louise de Marillac	12 August 1591	15 March 1660	11 March 1934 by Pope Pius XI	
Lubentius	c. 300	c. 370		
Luca Antonio Falcone	19 October 1669	30 October 1739	15 October 2017 by Pope Francis	
Lucas Hwang Soktu	1813	30 March 1866	6 May 1984 by Pope John Paul II	One of the Korean Martyrs
Lucia Kim Kopchu	1769	September 1839	6 May 1984 by Pope John Paul II	One of the Korean Martyrs
Lucia Kim Nusia	1818	20 July 1839	6 May 1984 by Pope John Paul II	One of the Korean Martyrs
Lucia Pak Huisun	1801	24 May 1839	6 May 1984 by Pope John Paul II	One of the Korean Martyrs
Lucia Wang Cheng	c. 1882	28 June 1900	1 October 2000 by Pope John Paul II	One of the Martyr Saints of China
Lucian of Antioch	c. 240	7 January 312	found in Roman Martyrology	
Lucidus of Aquara	c. 960	5 December 1038	8 January 1880 (equipollent) by Pope Leo XIII	
Lucius	unknown	c. 165	found in Roman Martyrology	
Lucius of Britain	unknown	100s	found in Roman Martyrology	
Lucy	c. 283	304	found in Roman Martyrology	
Lucy Filippini	16 January 1672	25 March 1732	22 June 1930 by Pope Pius XI	Founder of the Religious Teachers Filippini (Filippini Sisters)
Lucy Wang Wangzhi	c. 1869	22 July 1900	1 October 2000 by Pope John Paul II	One of the Martyr Saints of China
Lucy Yi Zhenmei	9 December 1815	19 February 1862	1 October 2000 by Pope John Paul II	One of the Martyr Saints of China
Ludger	742	26 March 809	found in Roman Martyrology	
Ludmila of Bohemia	c. 860	15 September 921		
Ludovico of Casoria	11 March 1814	30 March 1885	23 November 2014 by Pope Francis	
Luigi Guanella	19 December 1842	24 October 1915	23 October 2011 by Pope Benedict XVI	
Luigi Maria Palazzolo	10 December 1827	15 June 1886	15 May 2022 by Pope Francis	
Luigi Orione	23 June 1872	12 March 1940	16 May 2004 by Pope John Paul II	
Luigi Scrosoppi	4 August 1804	3 April 1884	10 June 2001 by Pope John Paul II	
Luigi Versiglia	5 June 1873	25 February 1930	1 October 2000 by Pope John Paul II	One of the Martyr Saints of China
Luis Batis Sáinz	13 September 1870	15 August 1926	21 May 2000 by Pope John Paul II	One of the Saints of the Cristero War
Luke Alonso Gorda	18 October 1594	19 October 1633	18 October 1987 by Pope John Paul II	One of the 16 Martyrs of Japan
Luke Kirby	c. 1549	30 May 1582	25 October 1970 by Pope Paul VI	One of the Forty Martyrs of England and Wales
Luke Ngati	January 1987	15 February 2015	found in Roman Martyrology (added on 11 May 2023 by Pope Francis)	Coptic Orthodox, one of the 21 Coptic Christian Martyrs of Libya
Luke Phạm Trọng Thìn	c. 1819	13 January 1859	19 June 1988 by Pope John Paul II	One of the Vietnamese Martyrs
Luke the Evangelist	unknown	March 84 AD	found in Roman Martyrology	
Luke Vũ Bá Loan	c. 1756	5 June 1840	19 June 1988 by Pope John Paul II	One of the Vietnamese Martyrs
Lukka Baanabakintu	1800s	3 June 1886	18 October 1964 by Pope Paul VI	One of the Uganda Martyrs
Lutgardis	1182	16 June 1246	found in Roman Martyrology	
Luxorius	200s	21 August c. 304	found in Roman Martyrology	
Lydia of Thyatira	unknown	0s	found in Roman Martyrology	
Macarius of Alexandria	c. 300	395	found in Roman Martyrology	
Macarius of Egypt	c. 300	391	found in Roman Martyrology	
Machar	unknown	500s	11 July 1898 (equipollent) by Pope Leo XIII	
Macrina the Younger	c. 330	19 July 379	found in Roman Martyrology	
Madeleine Sophie Barat	12 December 1779	25 May 1865	24 May 1925 by Pope Pius XI	
Máedóc of Ferns	c. 558	31 January 632		
Máel Ruba	c. 642	722	11 July 1898 (equipollent) by Pope Leo XIII	
Magdalena Cho	1807	September 1839	6 May 1984 by Pope John Paul II	One of the Korean Martyrs
Magdalena Han Yongi	1783	29 December 1839	6 May 1984 by Pope John Paul II	One of the Korean Martyrs
Magdalena Ho Kyeim	1773	26 September 1839	6 May 1984 by Pope John Paul II	One of the Korean Martyrs
Magdalena Kim Obi	1774	24 May 1839	6 May 1984 by Pope John Paul II	One of the Korean Martyrs
Magdalena Pak Pongson	1796	26 September 1839	6 May 1984 by Pope John Paul II	One of the Korean Martyrs
Magdalena Son Sobyok	1802	31 January 1840	6 May 1984 by Pope John Paul II	One of the Korean Martyrs
Magdalena Yi Yongdok	1812	29 December 1839	6 May 1984 by Pope John Paul II	One of the Korean Martyrs
Magdalena Yi Yonghui	1809	20 July 1839	6 May 1984 by Pope John Paul II	One of the Korean Martyrs
Magdalene Du Fengju	c. 1858	29 June 1900	1 October 2000 by Pope John Paul II	One of the Martyr Saints of China
Magdalene of Canossa	1 March 1774	10 April 1835	2 October 1988 by Pope John Paul II	Founder of the Canossian Daughters of Charity and the Canossian Sons of Charity
Magdalene of Nagasaki	1611	15 October 1634	18 October 1987 by Pope John Paul II	One of the 16 Martyrs of Japan
Magnus Erlendsson	1080	16 April 1117	11 July 1898 (equipollent) by Pope Leo XIII	
Magnus of Anagni	unknown	100s	found in Roman Martyrology	
Magnus of Cuneo	unknown	200s	found in Roman Martyrology	
Magnus of Fossombrone	unknown	200s	found in Roman Martyrology	
Majed Suleiman Shehata	24 August 1973	15 February 2015	found in Roman Martyrology (added on 11 May 2023 by Pope Francis)	Coptic Orthodox, one of the 21 Coptic Christian Martyrs of Libya
Majolus of Cluny	c. 906	11 May 994	found in Roman Martyrology	
Malachy	1094	2 November 1148	1190 by Pope Clement III	
Malak Faraj Abram	1 January 1984	15 February 2015	found in Roman Martyrology (added on 11 May 2023 by Pope Francis)	Coptic Orthodox, one of the 21 Coptic Christian Martyrs of Libya
Malak Ibrahim Siniot	9 September 1986	15 February 2015	found in Roman Martyrology (added on 11 May 2023 by Pope Francis)	Coptic Orthodox, one of the 21 Coptic Christian Martyrs of Libya
Malchus of Syria	300s	c. 390	found in Roman Martyrology	
Manuel González García	25 February 1877	4 January 1940	16 October 2016 by Pope Francis	
Manuel Míguez González	24 March 1831	8 March 1925	15 October 2017 by Pope Francis	
Manuel Moralez	8 February 1898	15 August 1926	21 May 2000 by Pope John Paul II	One of the Saints of the Cristero War
Manuel Rodrigues de Moura	unknown	3 October 1645	15 October 2017 by Pope Francis	One of the Martyrs of Natal
Manuel Ruiz López	5 May 1804	10 July 1860	20 October 2024 by Pope Francis	
María de las Maravillas de Jesús	4 November 1891	11 December 1974	4 May 2003 by Pope John Paul II	
Marcella of Marseille	unknown	0s		
Marcellin Champagnat	20 May 1789	6 June 1840	18 April 1999 by Pope John Paul II	Professed priest of the Society of Mary, Marist Missionaries; founder of the Marist Brothers of the Schools
Marcellinus	200s	c. 304	found in Roman Martyrology	
Marcellinus of Tomi	200s	c. 320	found in Roman Martyrology	
Marcellus of Capua	300s or 400s	300s or 400s	found in Roman Martyrology	
Marcian of Tortona	0s	c. 120	found in Roman Martyrology	
Marciana of Mauretania	200s	303	found in Roman Martyrology	
Marciano José	15 November 1900	9 October 1934	21 November 1999 by Pope John Paul II	One of the Martyrs of Turon
Marcianus	200s	304	found in Roman Martyrology	
Margaret Clitherow	1556	25 March 1586	25 October 1970 by Pope Paul VI	One of the Forty Martyrs of England and Wales
Margaret Mary Alacoque	22 July 1647	17 October 1690	13 May 1920 by Pope Benedict XV	Professed religious of the Visitation Nuns
Margaret of Castello	1287	12 April 1320	24 April 2021 (equipollent) by Pope Francis	
Margaret of Cortona	1247	22 February 1297	16 May 1728 by Pope Benedict XIII	
Margaret of Hungary	27 January 1242	18 January 1270	19 November 1943 by Pope Pius XII	
Margaret of Scotland	c. 1045	16 November 1093	1250 by Pope Innocent IV	Married layperson and queen of Scotland
Margaret the Virgin	289	304	found in Roman Martyrology	
Margaret Ward	c. 1550	30 August 1588	25 October 1970 by Pope Paul VI	One of the Forty Martyrs of England and Wales
Margarito Flores García	22 February 1899	12 November 1927	21 May 2000 by Pope John Paul II	One of the Saints of the Cristero War
Marguerite Bays	8 September 1815	27 June 1879	13 October 2019 by Pope Francis	
Marguerite Bourgeoys	17 April 1620	12 January 1700	31 October 1982 by Pope John Paul II	Founder of the Sisters of the Congregation of Notre Dame of Montreal
María Antonia de Paz y Figueroa	1730	7 October 1799	11 February 2024 by Pope Francis	Argentina's first female saint
Maria Bernarda Bütler	28 May 1848	19 May 1924	12 October 2008 by Pope Benedict XVI	
Maria Bertilla Boscardin	6 October 1888	20 October 1922	11 May 1961 by Pope John XXIII	
Maria Crescentia Höss	20 October 1682	5 April 1744	25 November 2001 by John Paul II	Professed religious of the Franciscan Nuns of the Third Order Regular
Maria Cristina of the Immaculate Conception Brando	1 May 1856	20 January 1906	17 May 2015 by Pope Francis	
Maria Crocifissa di Rosa	6 November 1813	15 December 1855	12 June 1954 by Pope Pius XII	
Maria de Cervelló	1 December 1230	19 September 1290	12 February 1692 (equipollent) by Pope Innocent XII	
María de la Purísima Salvat Romero	20 February 1926	31 October 1998	18 October 2015 by Pope Francis	
Maria De Mattias	4 February 1805	20 August 1866	18 May 2003 by Pope John Paul II	
Maria Domenica Mantovani	12 November 1862	2 February 1934	15 May 2022 by Pope Francis	
Maria Domenica Mazzarello	9 May 1837	14 May 1881	24 June 1951 by Pope Pius XII	
Maria Fan Kun	c. 1884	28 June 1900	1 October 2000 by Pope John Paul II	One of the Martyr Saints of China
Maria Giuseppa Rossello	27 May 1811	7 December 1880	12 June 1949 by Pope Pius XII	
Maria Goretti	16 October 1890	6 July 1902	24 June 1950 by Pope Pius XII	
María Guadalupe García Zavala	27 April 1878	24 June 1963	12 May 2013 by Pope Francis	
María Josefa Sancho de Guerra	7 September 1842	20 March 1912	1 October 2000 by Pope John Paul II	
Maria Katharina Kasper	26 May 1820	2 February 1898	14 October 2018 by Pope Francis	
Maria Micaela Desmaisieres	1 January 1809	24 August 1865	4 March 1934 by Pope Pius XI	
María Natividad Venegas de la Torre	8 September 1868	30 July 1959	21 May 2000 by Pope John Paul II	
Maria of Córdoba	unknown	24 November 851	found in Roman Martyrology	One of the Martyrs of Córdoba
Maria Pak Kunagi	1786	3 September 1839	6 May 1984 by Pope John Paul II	One of the Korean Martyrs
Maria Soledad Torres y Acosta	2 December 1826	11 October 1887	25 January 1970 by Pope Paul VI	
Maria Won Kwiim	1818	20 July 1839	6 May 1984 by Pope John Paul II	One of the Korean Martyrs
Maria Yi Indok	1819	31 January 1840	6 May 1984 by Pope John Paul II	One of the Korean Martyrs
Maria Yi Yonhui	1804	3 September 1839	6 May 1984 by Pope John Paul II	One of the Korean Martyrs
Maria Zhao	c. 1883	late July 1900	1 October 2000 by Pope John Paul II	One of the Martyr Saints of China
Maria Zheng Xu	c. 1889	28 June 1900	1 October 2000 by Pope John Paul II	One of the Martyr Saints of China
Mariam Baouardy	5 January 1846	26 August 1878	17 May 2015 by Pope Francis	
Mariam Thresia Chiramel	26 April 1876	8 June 1926	13 October 2019 by Pope Francis	Syro-Malabar Catholic nun and the founder of the Congregation of the Holy Family
Mariana de Jesús de Paredes	31 October 1618	26 May 1645	9 July 1950 by Pope Pius XII	Layperson of the Archdiocese of Quito, member of the Secular Franciscans
Marianna Giuliani	12 December 1875	9 July 1900	1 October 2000 by Pope John Paul II	One of the Martyr Saints of China
Marianne Cope	23 January 1838	9 August 1918	21 October 2012 by Pope Benedict XVI	
Marie Adolphine Dierks	8 March 1866	9 July 1900	1 October 2000 by Pope John Paul II	One of the Martyr Saints of China
Marie of Jesus Crucified Piedcourt	9 December 1715	17 July 1794	18 December 2024 by Pope Francis	One of the Martyrs of Compiègne
Marie of Saint Just	9 April 1866	9 July 1900	1 October 2000 by Pope John Paul II	One of the Martyr Saints of China
Marie of Saint Natalie	4 May 1864	9 July 1900	1 October 2000 by Pope John Paul II	One of the Martyr Saints of China
Marie of the Holy Spirit Roussel	3 August 1742	17 July 1794	18 December 2024 by Pope Francis	One of the Martyrs of Compiègne
Marie of the Incarnation	28 October 1599	30 April 1672	3 April 2014 (equipollent) by Pope Francis	founder of the Ursulines of Quebec convent
Marie-Alphonsine Danil Ghattas	4 October 1843	25 March 1927	17 May 2015 by Pope Francis	
Marie-Azélie Guérin	23 December 1831	28 August 1877	18 October 2015 by Pope Francis	
Marie-Eugénie de Jésus	25 August 1817	10 March 1898	3 June 2007 by Pope Benedict XVI	
Marie-Henriette of Providence Pelras	16 June 1760	17 July 1794	18 December 2024 by Pope Francis	One of the Martyrs of Compiègne
Marie-Léonie Paradis	12 May 1840	3 May 1912	20 October 2024 by Pope Francis	
Marie-Madeleine Postel	28 November 1756	16 July 1846	24 May 1925 by Pope Pius XI	Founder of the Sisters of the Christian Schools of Saint Julie Postel
Marie-Marguerite d'Youville	15 October 1701	23 December 1771	9 December 1990 by Pope John Paul II	Widow; founder of the Sisters of Charity of Montreal (Gray Sisters)
Marie-Nicolas-Antoine Daveluy	16 March 1818	30 March 1866	6 May 1984 by Pope John Paul II	One of the Korean Martyrs
Marina of Aguas Santas	119	139	found in Roman Martyrology	
Marina of Omura	1500s or 1600s	11 November 1634	18 October 1987 by Pope John Paul II	One of the 16 Martyrs of Japan
Marinus	200s	366	found in Roman Martyrology	
Marius	200s	270	found in Roman Martyrology	
Mark Chong Uibae	1795	11 March 1866	6 May 1984 by Pope John Paul II	One of the Korean Martyrs
Mark Ji Tianxiang	c. 1834	7 July 1900	1 October 2000 by Pope John Paul II	One of the Martyr Saints of China
Mark the Evangelist	5 AD	25 April 68	found in Roman Martyrology	
Marko Krizin	1589	7 September 1619	2 July 1995 by Pope John Paul II	
Marolus	300s	23 April 423	found in Roman Martyrology	
Maron	300s	410		
Martha Dufour	2 October 1741	17 July 1794	18 December 2024 by Pope Francis	One of the Martyrs of Compiègne
Martha Kim Songim	1787	20 July 1839	6 May 1984 by Pope John Paul II	One of the Korean Martyrs
Martha of Bethany	unknown	0s	found in Roman Martyrology	
Martha of Persia	200s	270	found in Roman Martyrology	
Martha Wang Luo Mande	c. 1812	29 July 1861	1 October 2000 by Pope John Paul II	One of the Martyr Saints of China
Martin de Porres	9 December 1579	3 November 1639	6 May 1962 by Pope John XXIII	Professed religious of the Dominicans
Martin of Leon	c. 1130	12 January 1203	found in Roman Martyrology	
Martin of the Ascension	c. 1567	5 February 1597	8 June 1862 by Pope Pius IX	One of the 26 Martyrs of Japan
Martin of Tours	316 or 336	8 November 397	found in Roman Martyrology	
Martin Thọ	c. 1787	8 November 1840	19 June 1988 by Pope John Paul II	One of the Vietnamese Martyrs
Martin Wu Xuesheng	c. 1817	18 February 1862	1 October 2000 by Pope John Paul II	One of the Martyr Saints of China
Martin-Luc Huin	20 October 1836	30 March 1866	6 May 1984 by Pope John Paul II	One of the Korean Martyrs
Martina of Rome	unknown	228	found in Roman Martyrology	
Martinian	c. 30 AD	c. 67 AD	found in Roman Martyrology	
Martinianus	300s	29 December 435	found in Roman Martyrology	
Maruthas of Martyropolis	300s	c. 420	found in Roman Martyrology	
Mary	c. 8 September 18 BC	0s	found in Roman Martyrology	Mother of Jesus Christ
Mary An Guoshi	c. 1836	11 July 1900	1 October 2000 by Pope John Paul II	One of the Martyr Saints of China
Mary An Linghua	c. 1871	11 July 1900	1 October 2000 by Pope John Paul II	One of the Martyr Saints of China
Mary Du Tianshi	c. 1881	29 June 1900	1 October 2000 by Pope John Paul II	One of the Martyr Saints of China
Mary Du Zhaozhi	c. 1849	28 June 1900	1 October 2000 by Pope John Paul II	One of the Martyr Saints of China
Mary Euphrasia Pelletier	31 July 1796	24 April 1868	2 May 1940 by Pope Pius XII	
Mary Frances of the Five Wounds	25 March 1715	7 October 1791	29 June 1867 by Pope Pius IX	
Mary Fu Guilin	c. 1863	20 July 1900	1 October 2000 by Pope John Paul II	One of the Martyr Saints of China
Mary Guo Li	c. 1835	7 July 1900	1 October 2000 by Pope John Paul II	One of the Martyr Saints of China
Mary Hermina Grivot	28 April 1866	9 July 1900	1 October 2000 by Pope John Paul II	One of the Martyr Saints of China
Mary MacKillop	15 January 1842	8 August 1909	17 October 2010 by Pope Benedict XVI	
Mary Magdalene	unknown	0s	found in Roman Martyrology	
Mary Magdalene de' Pazzi	2 April 1566	25 May 1607	28 April 1669 by Pope Clement IX	
Mary of Bethany	unknown	0s	found in Roman Martyrology	Identified as Mary of Magdalene historically
Mary Qi Yu	c. 1885	28 June 1900	1 October 2000 by Pope John Paul II	One of the Martyr Saints of China
Mary Wang Lishi	c. 1851	22 July 1900	1 October 2000 by Pope John Paul II	One of the Martyr Saints of China
Mary Zhao Guoshi	c. 1840	late July 1900	1 October 2000 by Pope John Paul II	One of the Martyr Saints of China
Mary Zhu Wushi	c. 1850	20 July 1900	1 October 2000 by Pope John Paul II	One of the Martyr Saints of China
Mateo Alonso de Leciniana, OP	26 November 1702	22 January 1745	19 June 1988 by Pope John Paul II	One of the Vietnamese Martyrs
Mateo Correa Magallanes	23 July 1866	6 February 1927	21 May 2000 by Pope John Paul II	One of the Saints of the Cristero War
Mateus Moreira	unknown	3 October 1645	15 October 2017 by Pope Francis	One of the Martyrs of Natal
Matilda of Ringelheim	c. 894 or 897	14 March 968	found in Roman Martyrology	
Matiya Mulumba	1836	30 May 1886	18 October 1964 by Pope Paul VI	One of the Uganda Martyrs
Matthew Ayariga	1900s	15 February 2015	found in Roman Martyrology (added on 11 May 2023 by Pope Francis)	one of the 21 Coptic Christian Martyrs of Libya
Matthew Feng De	c. 1855	9 July 1900	1 October 2000 by Pope John Paul II	One of the Martyr Saints of China
Matthew Kohioye	1615	19 October 1633	18 October 1987 by Pope John Paul II	One of the 16 Martyrs of Japan
Matthew Lê Văn Gẫm	c. 1813	11 May 1847	19 June 1988 by Pope John Paul II	One of the Vietnamese Martyrs
Matthew Nguyễn Văn Ðắc	c. 1808	26 May 1861	19 June 1988 by Pope John Paul II	One of the Vietnamese Martyrs
Matthew the Apostle	0s	0s	found in Roman Martyrology	
Matthias	0s	c. 80 AD	found in Roman Martyrology	
Matthias of Jerusalem	0s	120	found in Roman Martyrology	
Matthias of Miyako	1500s	5 February 1597	8 June 1862 by Pope Pius IX	One of the 26 Martyrs of Japan
Maura	unknown	300s		
Maurice	200s	287	found in Roman Martyrology	
Maurus	1 January 512	15 January 584	found in Roman Martyrology	
Maurus of Pécs	c. 1000	c. 1075	4 August 1848 by Pope Pius IX	
Maximilian Kolbe	8 January 1894	14 August 1941	10 October 1982 by Pope John Paul II	
Maximus of Évreux	300s	c. 384		
Maximus of Naples	unknown	361	13 June 1871 (equipollent) by Pope Pius IX	
Maximus of Rome	unknown	c. 260	found in Roman Martyrology	
Maximus the Confessor	c. 580	13 August 662	found in Roman Martyrology	
Mbaga Tuzinde	1800s	3 June 1886	18 October 1964 by Pope Paul VI	One of the Uganda Martyrs
Mechtilde	c.1241	19 November 1298	found in Roman Martyrology	
Meinhard	1134 or 1136	1196	8 September 1993 (equipollent) by Pope John Paul II	Professed priest of the Canons Regular of Saint Augustine, Bishop of Latvia
Meinrad of Einsiedeln	c. 797	21 January 861	found in Roman Martyrology	
Melad Mackeen Zaki	1 October 1988	15 February 2015	found in Roman Martyrology (added on 11 May 2023 by Pope Francis)	Coptic Orthodox, one of the 21 Coptic Christian Martyrs of Libya
Melania the Younger	c. 383	31 December 439	found in Roman Martyrology	
Melchior Grodziecki	c. 1582	7 September 1619	2 July 1995 by Pope John Paul II	
Melchor García Sampedro	26 April 1821	28 July 1858	19 June 1988 by Pope John Paul II	One of the Vietnamese Martyrs
Meletius of Antioch	300s	381	found in Roman Martyrology	
Melito of Sardis	100s	180		
Melangell	500s	590		
Mena Fayez Aziz	8 October 1991	15 February 2015	found in Roman Martyrology (added on 11 May 2023 by Pope Francis)	Coptic Orthodox, one of the 21 Coptic Christian Martyrs of Libya
Menas	285	c. 309	found in Roman Martyrology	
Menodora	200s	305–311	found in Roman Martyrology	
Methodius	815	6 April 885	found in Roman Martyrology	
Methodius of Olympus	200s	c. 311		
Metrodora	200s	305–311	found in Roman Martyrology	
Mercurialis of Forlì	300s	406	found in Roman Martyrology	
Michael de Sanctis	29 September 1591	10 April 1625	8 June 1862 by Pope Pius IX	
Michael Hồ Đình Hy	1808	22 May 1857	19 June 1988 by Pope John Paul II	One of the Vietnamese Martyrs
Michael Kozaki	c. 1551	5 February 1597	8 June 1862 by Pope Pius IX	One of the 26 Martyrs of Japan
Michael Kurobioye	1500s or 1600s	17 August 1633	18 October 1987 by Pope John Paul II	One of the 16 Martyrs of Japan
Michael Nguyễn Huy Mỹ	c. 1804	12 August 1838	19 June 1988 by Pope John Paul II	One of the Vietnamese Martyrs
Michel Garicoïts	15 April 1797	14 May 1863	6 July 1947 by Pope Pius XII	
Miguel de Aozaraza	7 February 1598	29 September 1637	18 October 1987 by Pope John Paul II	One of the 16 Martyrs of Japan
Miguel de la Mora	19 June 1874	7 August 1927	21 May 2000 by Pope John Paul II	One of the Saints of the Cristero War
Miguel Febres Cordero	7 November 1854	9 February 1910	21 October 1984 by Pope John Paul II	
Mildrith	c. 660	c. 730		
Mirocles	200s	30 November c. 316		
Mo Chutu of Lismore	unknown	14 May 639		
Modeste Andlauer, S.J.	22 May 1847	19 June 1900	1 October 2000 by Pope John Paul II	One of the Martyr Saints of China
Moluag	c. 500-520	592	11 July 1898 (equipollent) by Pope Leo XIII	
Monica	332	387	found in Roman Martyrology	
Moninne	c. 435	c. 517		
Monitor		c. 490		Bishop of Orléans
Moses the Black	330	405	found in Roman Martyrology	
Mugagga Lubowa	1800s	3 June 1886	18 October 1964 by Pope Paul VI	One of the Uganda Martyrs
Mukasa Kiriwawanvu	1800s	3 June 1886	18 October 1964 by Pope Paul VI	One of the Uganda Martyrs
Munditia	200s	c. 310		
Mungo	518	13 January 614		
Mutien-Marie Wiaux	20 March 1841	30 January 1917	10 December 1989 by Pope John Paul II	
Nabor of Milan	200s	c. 303	found in Roman Martyrology	
Nabor of Rome	200s	c. 303	found in Roman Martyrology	
Narcisa de Jesús	29 October 1832	8 December 1869	12 October 2008 by Pope Benedict XVI	
Narcissus	200s	c. 320	found in Roman Martyrology	
Narnus	unknown	345	found in Roman Martyrology	
Natalia of Córdoba	c. 825	27 July 852	found in Roman Martyrology	One of the Martyrs of Córdoba
Natalis	unknown	700s		
Nathalan	0000	678	11 July 1898 (equipollent) by Pope Leo XIII	
Naum	c. 830	23 December 910		
Nazaria Ignacia March Mesa	10 January 1889	6 July 1943	14 October 2018 by Pope Francis	
Nazarius	unknown	unknown	found in Roman Martyrology	
Nazarius of Rome	200s	c. 303	found in Roman Martyrology	
Nectarius of Auvergne	200s	c. 300		
Nereus	0s	c. 100	found in Roman Martyrology	
Nerses I	c. 300	373		
Nerses IV the Gracious	1102	13 August 1173	found in Roman Martyrology, added on 18 May 2026 by Pope Leo XIV	Armenian Orthodox
Nicanor Ascanio Soria	1814	10 July 1860	20 October 2024 by Pope Francis	
Nicanor the Deacon	unknown	76 AD	found in Roman Martyrology	
Nicasius of Die	200s	300s		
Nicasius of Heeze	1522	9 July 1572	29 June 1867 by Pope Pius IX	One of the Martyrs of Gorkum
Nicetas the Goth	300s	372	found in Roman Martyrology	
Nicholas Bùi Đức Thể	c. 1792	12 June 1839	19 June 1988 by Pope John Paul II	One of the Vietnamese Martyrs
Nicholas of Flüe	1417	21 March 1487	15 May 1947 by Pope Pius XII	
Nicholas of Myra	15 March 270	6 December 342	found in Roman Martyrology	
Nicholas of Sassoferrato	unknown	10 October 1227	22 January 1516 by Pope Leo X	One of the seven Franciscan martyrs of Ceuta
Nicholas of Tolentino	c. 1246	10 September 1305	5 June 1446 by Pope Eugene IV	
Nicholas Owen	c. 1562	1 or 2 March 1606	25 October 1970 by Pope Paul VI	One of the Forty Martyrs of England and Wales
Nicholas Pieck	29 August 1534	9 July 1572	29 June 1867 by Pope Pius IX	One of the Martyrs of Gorkum
Nicholas Poppel	1532	9 July 1572	29 June 1867 by Pope Pius IX	One of the Martyrs of Gorkum
Nicholas Tavelic	c. 1340	14 November 1391	21 June 1970 by Pope Paul VI	
Nicholas the Pilgrim	1075	2 June 1094	1098 by Pope Urban II	
Nicodemus	c. 1 BC	0s	found in Roman Martyrology	
Nicola Saggio	6 January 1650	3 February 1709	23 November 2014 by Pope Francis	Professed Oblate of the Minims
Nicolás María Alberca Torres	10 September 1830	10 July 1860	20 October 2024 by Pope Francis	
Nicomedes	unknown	0s	found in Roman Martyrology	
Nilus of Palestine	200s	c. 304	found in Roman Martyrology	
Nilus of Sinai	300s	12 November 430	found in Roman Martyrology	
Nimatullah Kassab	1808	14 December 1858	16 May 2004 by Pope John Paul II	
Ninian	300s	c. 432		
Nino	c. 280	c. 332		
Noël Chabanel	2 February 1613	8 December 1649	29 June 1930 by Pope Pius XI	One of the Canadian Martyrs
Norbert of Xanten	c. 1075	6 June 1134	1582 by Pope Gregory XIII	
Nostrianus	unknown	between 452 and 465	2 May 1878 (equipollent) by Pope Leo XIII	
Notburga	c. 1265	13 September 1313	27 March 1862 (equipollent) by Pope Pius IX	
Nothhelm	600s	17 October 739		
Novatus	unknown	151	found in Roman Martyrology	
Nowa Mawaggali	1800s	31 May 1886	18 October 1964 by Pope Paul VI	One of the Uganda Martyrs
Nuno Álvares Pereira	24 June 1360	1 April 1431	26 April 2009 by Pope Benedict XVI	
Nunzio Sulprizio	13 April 1817	5 May 1836	14 October 2018 by Pope Francis	
Nympha	unknown	c. 250	found in Roman Martyrology	
Nymphodora	200s	305–311	found in Roman Martyrology	
Obitius	c. 4 February 1150	c. 6 December 1204	23 July 1900 (equipollent) by Pope Leo XIII	
Oda	c. 680	c. 726		
Odile of Alsace	660	0720		
Odilia of Cologne	300s	300s	found in Roman Martyrology	
Odilo of Cluny	c. 962	1 January 1049	found in Roman Martyrology	
Odo of Cluny	c. 880	18 November 942	found in Roman Martyrology	
Olaf II of Norway	995	29 July 1030	found in Roman Martyrology	
Olga of Kiev	890–925	969		Also known as Elena
Oliva of Brescia	unknown	138		
Oliver Plunkett	1 November 1625	1 July 1681	12 October 1975 by Pope Paul VI	
Onesimus	unknown	c. 68 AD	found in Roman Martyrology	
Onesiphorus	unknown	c. 81 AD	found in Roman Martyrology	
Onuphrius	unknown	300s or 400s	found in Roman Martyrology	
Optatus	unknown	300s	found in Roman Martyrology	
Oran of Iona	400s	500s		
Orentius	200s	304	found in Roman Martyrology	
Orientius	unknown	400s	found in Roman Martyrology	
Osana	698	750		
Óscar Romero	15 August 1917	24 March 1980	14 October 2018 by Pope Francis	
Osmund	1000s	3 or 4 December 1099	1 January 1457 by Pope Callixtus III	
Oswald of Northumbria	c. 604	5 August 641 or 642		Anglo-Saxon king of Northumbia
Othmar	c. 689	c. 759		
Otto of Bamberg	c. 1060	30 June 1139	1189 by Pope Clement III	
Ovidius	unknown	c. 135		
Pachomius the Great	292	9 May 348	found in Roman Martyrology	
Pacian	c. 310	c. 391	found in Roman Martyrology	
Pacificus of San Severino	1 March 1653	24 September 1721	26 May 1839 by Pope Gregory XVI	
Palatias	200s	302	found in Roman Martyrology	
Palladius	0000	early 400s	11 July 1898 (equipollent) by Pope Leo XIII	
Pamphilus of Caesarea	late 200s	16 February 309		
Pancras of Rome	c. 289	12 May 303 or 304	found in Roman Martyrology	
Pancras of Taormina	unknown	c. 40 AD	found in Roman Martyrology	
Pantaenus	100s	c. 200	found in Roman Martyrology	
Pantagathus	unknown	17 April 541	found in Roman Martyrology	
Pantaleon	c. 275	305	found in Roman Martyrology	
Paola Elisabetta Cerioli	28 January 1816	24 December 1865	16 May 2004 by Pope John Paul II	
Paphnutius of Thebes	200s	300s	found in Roman Martyrology	
Papias of Hierapolis	unknown	100s	found in Roman Martyrology	
Parmenas	0s	98 AD	found in Roman Martyrology	One of the Seven Deacons
Parthenius	unknown	200s	found in Roman Martyrology	
Paschal Baylon	16 May 1540	17 May 1592	16 October 1690 by Pope Alexander VIII	
Paschasius Radbertus	785	865	1073 by Pope Gregory VII	
Patermutius	unknown	300s		
Paternus of Auch	unknown	150		
Patiens	unknown	12 November 150		
Patrick	unknown	400s	found in Roman Martyrology	
Patrick Dong Bodi	c. 1882	9 July 1900	1 October 2000 by Pope John Paul II	One of the Martyr Saints of China
Paul Chen Changpin	c. 1838	29 July 1861	1 October 2000 by Pope John Paul II	One of the Martyr Saints of China
Paul Chong Hasang	1794/1795	22 September 1839	6 May 1984 by Pope John Paul II	One of the Korean Martyrs
Paul Denn, S.J.	1 April 1847	20 July 1900	1 October 2000 by Pope John Paul II	One of the Martyr Saints of China
Paul Ge Tingzhu	c. 1839	8 August 1900	1 October 2000 by Pope John Paul II	One of the Martyr Saints of China
Paul Hạnh	c. 1826	28 May 1859	19 June 1988 by Pope John Paul II	One of the Vietnamese Martyrs
Paul Ho Hyob	1796	30 January 1840	6 May 1984 by Pope John Paul II	One of the Korean Martyrs
Paul Hong Yongju	1802	1 February 1840	6 May 1984 by Pope John Paul II	One of the Korean Martyrs
Paul Ibaraki	1500s	5 February 1597	8 June 1862 by Pope Pius IX	One of the 26 Martyrs of Japan
Paul Lê Bảo Tịnh	c. 1793	6 April 1857	19 June 1988 by Pope John Paul II	One of the Vietnamese Martyrs
Paul Lê Văn Lộc	c. 1830	13 February 1859	19 June 1988 by Pope John Paul II	One of the Vietnamese Martyrs
Paul Liu Hanzuo	c. 1778	13 February 1818	1 October 2000 by Pope John Paul II	One of the Martyr Saints of China
Paul Liu Jinde	c. 1821	13 July 1900	1 October 2000 by Pope John Paul II	One of the Martyr Saints of China
Paul Miki	c. 1562	5 February 1597	8 June 1862 by Pope Pius IX	One of the 26 Martyrs of Japan
Paul Nguyễn Ngân	c. 1771	8 November 1840	19 June 1988 by Pope John Paul II	One of the Vietnamese Martyrs
Paul Nguyen Van My	c. 1798	18 December 1838	19 June 1988 by Pope John Paul II	One of the Vietnamese Martyrs
Paul of Córdoba	unknown	17 April 856	found in Roman Martyrology	One of the Martyrs of Córdoba
Paul of Saint Zoilus	unknown	20 July 851	found in Roman Martyrology	One of the Martyrs of Córdoba
Paul of the Cross	3 January 1694	18 October 1775	29 June 1867 by Pope Pius IX	
Paul of Thebes	c. 227	c. 342		First hermit
Paul Phạm Khắc Khoan	c. 1771	28 April 1840	19 June 1988 by Pope John Paul II	One of the Vietnamese Martyrs
Paul Suzuki	1563	5 February 1597	8 June 1862 by Pope Pius IX	One of the 26 Martyrs of Japan
Paul the Apostle	c. 5 AD	c. 64 or 67 AD	found in Roman Martyrology	
Paul the Simple	c. 225	c. 339	found in Roman Martyrology	
Paul Tong Viet Buong	c. 1773	23 October 1833	19 June 1988 by Pope John Paul II	One of the Vietnamese Martyrs
Paul Vũ Văn Dương	c. 1792	3 June 1862	19 June 1988 by Pope John Paul II	One of the Vietnamese Martyrs
Paul Wu Anju	c. 1838	29 June 1900	1 October 2000 by Pope John Paul II	One of the Martyr Saints of China
Paula Frassinetti	3 March 1809	11 June 1882	11 March 1984 by Pope John Paul II	
Paula Montal Fornés	11 October 1799	26 February 1889	25 November 2001 by Pope John Paul II	
Pauline of the Agonizing Heart of Jesus	16 December 1865	9 July 1942	19 May 2002 by Pope John Paul II	
Paulinus II of Aquileia	c. 726	802 or 804		
Paulinus of Antioch	unknown	67 AD	found in Roman Martyrology	
Paulinus of Nola	354	22 June 431		
Paulinus of Trier	unknown	358	found in Roman Martyrology	
Paulus Lang Fu	c. 1893	16 July 1900	1 October 2000 by Pope John Paul II	One of the Martyr Saints of China
Paulus Wu Wanshu	c. 1884	29 June 1900	1 October 2000 by Pope John Paul II	One of the Martyr Saints of China
Pausilippus	unknown	130	found in Roman Martyrology	
Pedro Almato, OP	1 November 1830	1 November 1861	19 June 1988 by Pope John Paul II	One of the Vietnamese Martyrs
Pedro Armengol	c. 1238	27 April 1304	8 April 1687 by Pope Innocent XI	
Pedro Calungsod	21 July 1654	2 April 1672	21 October 2012 by Pope Benedict XVI	
Pedro de Arbués	c. 1441	17 September 1485	29 June 1867 by Pope Pius IX	
Pedro Esqueda Ramirez	29 April 1887	22 November 1927	21 May 2000 by Pope John Paul II	One of the Saints of the Cristero War
Pedro Nolasco Soler Méndez	1827	10 July 1860	20 October 2024 by Pope Francis	
Pedro Poveda Castroverde	3 December 1874	28 July 1936	4 May 2003 by Pope John Paul II	
Pega	c. 673	c.719		
Pelagia of Tarsus	unknown	300s	found in Roman Martyrology	
Peleus	unknown	300s	found in Roman Martyrology	
Peregrine Laziosi	c. 1260	1 May 1345	27 December 1726 by Pope Benedict XIII	
Peregrine of Auxerre	200s	c. 304	found in Roman Martyrology	
Peregrinus	0s	138		
Perfectus of Córdoba	unknown	18 April 850	found in Roman Martyrology	One of the Martyrs of Córdoba
Perpetua	182	7 March 203	found in Roman Martyrology	See also Passion of Saint Perpetua, Saint Felicitas, and their Companions
Perpetua Hong Kimju	1804	26 September 1839	6 May 1984 by Pope John Paul II	One of the Korean Martyrs
Peter	c. 1 AD	64–68 AD	found in Roman Martyrology	
Peter Balsam	200s	311	found in Roman Martyrology	Crucified at Aulane during the Maximinian persecution
Peter Baptist	24 June 1542	5 February 1597	8 June 1862 by Pope Pius IX	One of the 26 Martyrs of Japan
Peter Canisius	8 May 1521	21 December 1597	21 May 1925 by Pope Pius XI	
Peter Chanel	12 July 1803	28 April 1841	12 June 1954 by Pope Pius XII	Professed priest of the Society of Mary, Marist Missionaries; martyr
Peter Cho Hwaso	1815	13 December 1866	6 May 1984 by Pope John Paul II	One of the Korean Martyrs
Peter Choe Changhub	1787	29 December 1839	6 May 1984 by Pope John Paul II	One of the Korean Martyrs
Peter Choe Hyong	1814	9 March 1866	6 May 1984 by Pope John Paul II	One of the Korean Martyrs
Peter Chong Wonji	1846	13 December 1866	6 May 1984 by Pope John Paul II	One of the Korean Martyrs
Peter Chrysologus	c. 380	31 July 450	found in Roman Martyrology	
Peter Claver	26 June 1580	8 September 1654	15 January 1888 by Pope Leo XIII	
Peter Đa	c. 1802	17 June 1862	19 June 1988 by Pope John Paul II	One of the Vietnamese Martyrs
Peter Damian	c. 988	22 February 1072 or 1073	found in Roman Martyrology	Doctor of the Church
Peter de Regalado	1390	30 March 1456	29 June 1746 by Pope Benedict XIV	
Peter Đinh Văn Thuần	c. 1802	6 June 1862	19 June 1988 by Pope John Paul II	One of the Vietnamese Martyrs
Peter Đoàn Công Quý	1826	31 July 1859	19 June 1988 by Pope John Paul II	One of the Vietnamese Martyrs
Peter Ðoàn Văn Vân	c. 1780	25 May 1857	19 June 1988 by Pope John Paul II	One of the Vietnamese Martyrs
Peter Dũng	c. 1800	6 June 1862	19 June 1988 by Pope John Paul II	One of the Vietnamese Martyrs
Peter Faber	14 April 1506	1 August 1545	17 December 2013 by Pope Francis	
Peter Fourier	30 November 1565	9 December 1640	27 May 1897 by Pope Leo XIII	
Peter González	1190	15 April 1246	13 December 1741 (cultus confirmed) by Pope Benedict XIV	
Peter Hong Pyongju	1799	31 January 1840	6 May 1984 by Pope John Paul II	One of the Korean Martyrs
Peter Julian Eymard	4 February 1811	1 August 1868	9 December 1962 by Pope John XXIII	
Peter Khan	c. 1780	12 July 1842	19 June 1988 by Pope John Paul II	One of the Vietnamese Martyrs
Peter Kwon Tugin	1805	24 May 1839	6 May 1984 by Pope John Paul II	One of the Korean Martyrs
Peter Lê Tuỳ	c. 1773	11 October 1833	19 June 1988 by Pope John Paul II	One of the Vietnamese Martyrs
Peter Li Quanhui	c. 1837	30 June 1900	1 October 2000 by Pope John Paul II	One of the Martyr Saints of China
Peter Liu	1760	17 May 1834	1 October 2000 by Pope John Paul II	One of the Martyr Saints of China
Peter Liu Ziyu	c. 1843	17 July 1900	1 October 2000 by Pope John Paul II	One of the Martyr Saints of China
Peter Nam Kyongmun	1797	20 September 1846	6 May 1984 by Pope John Paul II	One of the Korean Martyrs
Peter Nguyễn Bá Tuần	1766	15 July 1838	19 June 1988 by Pope John Paul II	One of the Vietnamese Martyrs
Peter Nguyen Dich	c. 1769	12 August 1838	19 June 1988 by Pope John Paul II	One of the Vietnamese Martyrs
Peter Nguyen Khac Tu	c. 1808	10 July 1840	19 June 1988 by Pope John Paul II	One of the Vietnamese Martyrs
Peter Nguyễn Văn Hiếu	c. 1783	28 April 1840	19 June 1988 by Pope John Paul II	One of the Vietnamese Martyrs
Peter Nguyễn Văn Lựu	c. 1812	7 April 1861	19 June 1988 by Pope John Paul II	One of the Vietnamese Martyrs
Peter Nguyễn Văn Tự	c. 1796	5 September 1838	19 June 1988 by Pope John Paul II	One of the Vietnamese Martyrs
Peter Nolasco	1189	6 May 1256	30 September 1628 by Pope Urban VIII	
Peter of Alcantara	1499	18 October 1562	28 April 1669 by Pope Clement IX	
Peter of Alexandria	200s	25 November 311		Pope of Alexandria
Peter of Anagni	1000s	1105	4 June 1109 by Pope Pascal II	
Peter of Assche	1530	9 July 1572	29 June 1867 by Pope Pius IX	One of the Martyrs of Gorkum
Peter of Canterbury	500s	c. 607	1915 (cultus confirmed) by Pope Benedict XV	
Peter of Córdoba	unknown	30 April 855	found in Roman Martyrology	One of the Martyrs of Córdoba
Peter of Écija	unknown	7 June 851	found in Roman Martyrology	One of the Martyrs of Córdoba
Peter of Jesus Maldonado	15 June 1892	11 February 1937	21 May 2000 by Pope John Paul II	One of the Saints of the Cristero War
Peter of Narbonne	1300s	14 November 1391	21 June 1970 by Pope Paul VI	Companion of Nicholas Tavelic
Peter of Pappacarbone	1000s	4 March 1123	21 December 1893 (equipollent) by Pope Leo XIII	
Peter of Saint Joseph de Betancur	21 March 1626	25 April 1667	30 July 2002 by Pope John Paul II	
Peter of Tarentaise	1102	14 September 1174	10 May 1191 by Pope Celestine III	
Peter of Verona	1205	6 April 1252	9 March 1253 by Pope Innocent IV	
Peter Pascual	c. 1227	1299 or 1300	14 August 1670 (equipollent) by Pope Clement X	
Peter Sanz	22 September 1680	26 May 1747	1 October 2000 by Pope John Paul II	One of the Martyr Saints of China
Peter Son Sonji	1820	13 December 1866	6 May 1984 by Pope John Paul II	One of the Korean Martyrs
Peter Sukejiro	1500s	5 February 1597	8 June 1862 by Pope Pius IX	One of the 26 Martyrs of Japan
Peter the Exorcist	200s	c. 304	found in Roman Martyrology	
Peter Thomas	1305	1366	1628 (cultus confirmed) by Pope Urban VIII	
Peter To Rot	5 March 1912	7 July 1945	19 October 2025 by Pope Leo XIV	
Peter Trương Văn Đường	c. 1808	18 December 1838	19 June 1988 by Pope John Paul II	One of the Vietnamese Martyrs
Peter Trương Văn Thi	c. 1763	21 December 1839	19 June 1988 by Pope John Paul II	One of the Vietnamese Martyrs
Peter Vũ Đăng Khoa	c. 1790	24 November 1838	19 June 1988 by Pope John Paul II	One of the Vietnamese Martyrs
Peter Vũ Văn Truật	c. 1816	18 December 1838	19 June 1988 by Pope John Paul II	One of the Vietnamese Martyrs
Peter Wang Erman	c. 1871	9 July 1900	1 October 2000 by Pope John Paul II	One of the Martyr Saints of China
Peter Wang Zuolong	c. 1842	6 July 1900	1 October 2000 by Pope John Paul II	One of the Martyr Saints of China
Peter Wu Anbang	c. 1860	9 July 1900	1 October 2000 by Pope John Paul II	One of the Martyr Saints of China
Peter Wu Guosheng	1768	7 November 1814	1 October 2000 by Pope John Paul II	One of the Martyr Saints of China
Peter Yi Hoyong	1803	25 November 1838	6 May 1984 by Pope John Paul II	One of the Korean Martyrs
Peter Yi Myongso	1821	13 December 1866	6 May 1984 by Pope John Paul II	One of the Korean Martyrs
Peter Yu Chongnyul	1837	17 February 1866	6 May 1984 by Pope John Paul II	One of the Korean Martyrs
Peter Yu Tae-chol	1826	31 October 1839	6 May 1984 by Pope John Paul II	One of the Korean Martyrs
Peter Zhang Banniu	c. 1850	9 July 1900	1 October 2000 by Pope John Paul II	One of the Martyr Saints of China
Peter Zhao Mingzhen	c. 1839	3 July 1900	1 October 2000 by Pope John Paul II	One of the Martyr Saints of China
Petronax of Monte Cassino	1 May 670	6 May 747		
Petronilla	unknown	c. 90 AD	found in Roman Martyrology	
Petrus Zhu Rixin	c. 1881	20 July 1900	1 October 2000 by Pope John Paul II	One of the Martyr Saints of China
Pharnacius of Satala	200s	304	found in Roman Martyrology	
Philemon	unknown	68 AD	found in Roman Martyrology	
Philetus	unknown	c. 121	found in Roman Martyrology	Roman senator
Philip Benizi de Damiani	15 August 1233	22 August 1285	12 April 1671 by Pope Clement X	
Philip Evans	1645	22 July 1679	25 October 1970 by Pope Paul VI	One of the Forty Martyrs of England and Wales
Philip Howard	28 June 1557	19 October 1595	25 October 1970 by Pope Paul VI	One of the Forty Martyrs of England and Wales
Philip Neri	21 July 1515	25 May 1595	12 March 1622 by Pope Gregory XV	
Philip of Gortyna	100s	180	found in Roman Martyrology	
Philip of Jesus	1572	5 February 1597	8 June 1862 by Pope Pius IX	One of the 26 Martyrs of Japan
Philip Phan Văn Minh	c. 1815	3 July 1853	19 June 1988 by Pope John Paul II	One of the Vietnamese Martyrs
Philip the Apostle	unknown	80 AD	found in Roman Martyrology	
Philip Zhang Zhihe	c. 1880	9 July 1900	1 October 2000 by Pope John Paul II	One of the Martyr Saints of China
Philo	unknown	150	found in Roman Martyrology	
Philomena	c. 10 January 291	c. 10 August 304	authorized on 13 January 1837 by Pope Gregory XVI to be venerated	Virgin, Martyr
Phocas	0s	102	found in Roman Martyrology	
Phocas the Gardener	200s	c. 303		
Pier Giorgio Frassati	6 April 1901	4 July 1925	7 September 2025 by Pope Leo XIV	
Pierre Aumaitre	8 April 1837	30 March 1866	6 May 1984 by Pope John Paul II	One of the Korean Martyrs
Pierre Dumoulin-Borie, MEP	20 February 1808	24 November 1838	19 June 1988 by Pope John Paul II	One of the Vietnamese Martyrs
Pierre-François Néron, MEP	21 September 1818	3 November 1860	19 June 1988 by Pope John Paul II	One of the Vietnamese Martyrs
Pierre-Henri Dorie	23 September 1839	7 March 1866	6 May 1984 by Pope John Paul II	One of the Korean Martyrs
Pierre-Philibert Maubant	20 September 1803	21 September 1839	6 May 1984 by Pope John Paul II	One of the Korean Martyrs
Pietro I Orseolo	928	10 January 987	18 April 1731 (equipollent) by Pope Clement XII	
Pietro Parenzo	1100s	1199	16 March 1879 (equipollent) by Pope Leo XIII	
Pinytus	100s	180	found in Roman Martyrology	
Pio of Pietrelcina	25 May 1887	23 September 1968	16 June 2002 by Pope John Paul II	
Pirmin	700	3 November 753		
Placidus	200s	300s	found in Roman Martyrology	
Placidus of Messina	unknown	500s		
Plautilla	unknown	67 AD	found in Roman Martyrology	
Plechelm	600s	730	c. 950 by Pope Agapetus II	
Podius of Florence	900s	1002	found in Roman Martyrology	Bishop of Florence
Polycarp	69 AD	156	found in Roman Martyrology	
Polydore Plasden	1563	10 December 1591	25 October 1970 by Pope Paul VI	One of the Forty Martyrs of England and Wales
Pompilio Maria Pirrotti	29 September 1710	15 July 1766	19 March 1934 by Pope Pius XI	Professed priest of the Piarists
Pomposa of Córdoba	unknown	19 September 853	found in Roman Martyrology	One of the Martyrs of Córdoba
Ponsiano Ngondwe	1800s	26 May 1886	18 October 1964 by Pope Paul VI	One of the Uganda Martyrs
Pontianus of Spoleto	c. 156	14 January 175	found in Roman Martyrology	
Pope Adeodatus I	570	8 November 618	found in Roman Martyrology	
Pope Adrian III	unknown	8 July 885	2 June 1891 (equipollent) by Pope Leo XIII	
Pope Agapetus I	unknown	22 April 536	found in Roman Martyrology	
Pope Agatho	600s	10 January 681	found in Roman Martyrology	
Pope Alexander I	10 January 75 AD	c. 115	found in Roman Martyrology	
Pope Anacletus	c. 25	26 April 92	found in Roman Martyrology	
Pope Anastasius I	300s	19 December 401	found in Roman Martyrology	
Pope Anicetus	0s	c. 20 April 168	found in Roman Martyrology	
Pope Anterus	100s	3 January 236	found in Roman Martyrology	
Pope Benedict II	600s	8 May 685	found in Roman Martyrology	
Pope Boniface I	300s	4 September 422	found in Roman Martyrology	
Pope Boniface IV	550	8 May 615	found in Roman Martyrology	
Pope Caius	200s	22 April 296	found in Roman Martyrology	
Pope Callixtus I	100s	222	found in Roman Martyrology	
Pope Celestine I	300s	1 August 432	found in Roman Martyrology	
Pope Celestine V	1215	19 May 1296	5 May 1313 by Pope Clement V	
Pope Clement I	c. 35 AD	99 AD	found in Roman Martyrology	
Pope Cornelius	unknown	June 253	found in Roman Martyrology	
Pope Damasus I	c. 305	11 December 384	found in Roman Martyrology	
Pope Dionysius	unknown	26 December 268	found in Roman Martyrology	
Pope Eleutherius	100s	189	found in Roman Martyrology	
Pope Eugene I	615	2 June 657	found in Roman Martyrology	
Pope Eusebius	200s	17 August 310	found in Roman Martyrology	
Pope Eutychian	200s	7 December 283	found in Roman Martyrology	
Pope Evaristus	17 April 44 AD	c. 107	found in Roman Martyrology	
Pope Fabian	c. 200	20 January 250	found in Roman Martyrology	
Pope Felix I	200s	30 December 274	found in Roman Martyrology	
Pope Felix III	400s	1 March 492	found in Roman Martyrology	
Pope Felix IV	490	22 September 530	found in Roman Martyrology	
Pope Gelasius I	400s	19 November 496	found in Roman Martyrology	
Pope Gregory I	c. 540	12 March 604	found in Roman Martyrology	Doctor of the Church
Pope Gregory II	669	11 February 731	found in Roman Martyrology	
Pope Gregory III	600s	28 November 741	found in Roman Martyrology	
Pope Gregory VII	1015	25 May 1085	24 May 1728 (equipollent) by Pope Benedict XIII	
Pope Hilarius	unknown	29 February 468	found in Roman Martyrology	
Pope Hormisdas	450	6 August 523	found in Roman Martyrology	
Pope Hyginus	unknown	142	found in Roman Martyrology	
Pope Innocent I	300s	12 March 417	found in Roman Martyrology	
Pope John I	400s	18 May 526	found in Roman Martyrology	
Pope John Paul II	18 May 1920	2 April 2005	27 April 2014 by Pope Francis	
Pope John XXIII	25 November 1881	3 June 1963	27 April 2014 by Pope Francis	
Pope Julius I	200s	12 April 352	found in Roman Martyrology	
Pope Leo I	c. 400	10 November 461	found in Roman Martyrology	Also known as Leo the Great, Doctor of the Church
Pope Leo II	611	July 683	found in Roman Martyrology	
Pope Leo III	unknown	12 June 816	1673 by Pope Clement X	
Pope Leo IV	790	17 July 855	found in Roman Martyrology	
Pope Leo IX	21 June 1002	19 April 1054	1082 by Pope Gregory VII	
Pope Linus	c. 10 AD	c. 76 AD	found in Roman Martyrology	
Pope Lucius I	c. 200	5 March 254	found in Roman Martyrology	
Pope Marcellinus	200s	304	found in Roman Martyrology	
Pope Marcellus I	6 January 255	16 January 309	found in Roman Martyrology	
Pope Mark	200s	7 October 336	found in Roman Martyrology	
Pope Martin I	21 June 598	16 September 655	found in Roman Martyrology	
Pope Miltiades	200s	10 or 11 January 314	found in Roman Martyrology	
Pope Nicholas I	800	13 November 867	8 May 868 by Pope Adrian II	
Pope Paschal I	unknown	28 June 767	found in Roman Martyrology	
Pope Paul I	700s	824	found in Roman Martyrology	
Pope Paul VI	26 September 1897	6 August 1978	14 October 2018 by Pope Francis	
Pope Pius I	late 1st century	c. 155	found in Roman Martyrology	
Pope Pius V	17 January 1504	1 May 1572	22 May 1712 by Pope Clement XI	
Pope Pius X	2 June 1835	20 August 1914	29 May 1954 by Pope Pius XII	
Pope Pontian	200s	October 235	found in Roman Martyrology	
Pope Sergius I	650	8 September 701	found in Roman Martyrology	
Pope Silverius	400s	2 December 538	found in Roman Martyrology	
Pope Simplicius	400s	10 March 483	found in Roman Martyrology	
Pope Siricius	334	26 November 399	found in Roman Martyrology	
Pope Sixtus I	42 AD	125	found in Roman Martyrology	
Pope Sixtus II	unknown	6 August 258	found in Roman Martyrology	
Pope Sixtus III	c. 390	18 August 440	found in Roman Martyrology	
Pope Soter	unknown	c. 174	found in Roman Martyrology	
Pope Stephen I	unknown	2 August 257	found in Roman Martyrology	
Pope Stephen IV	c. 770	24 January 817		
Pope Sylvester I	200s	31 December 335	found in Roman Martyrology	
Pope Symmachus	400s	19 July 514	found in Roman Martyrology	
Pope Telesphorus	unknown	c. 137	found in Roman Martyrology	
Pope Urban I	100s	23 May 230	found in Roman Martyrology	
Pope Victor I	100s	199	found in Roman Martyrology	
Pope Vitalian	600	27 January 672	found in Roman Martyrology	
Pope Zachary	679	15 March 752	found in Roman Martyrology	
Pope Zephyrinus	100s	20 December 217	found in Roman Martyrology	
Pope Zosimus	300s	26 December 418	found in Roman Martyrology	
Possidius	300s	400s	found in Roman Martyrology	
Potentian	300s	390	found in Roman Martyrology	
Pothinus	c. 87 AD	177	found in Roman Martyrology	Bishop of Lyon
Praejectus	625	25 January 676		
Praxedes	unknown	165	found in Roman Martyrology	
Primus	200s	c. 297	found in Roman Martyrology	
Prisca	0s	0s	found in Roman Martyrology	
Priscilla	0s	0s		
Priscus of Auxerre	unknown	c.272	found in Roman Martyrology	
Probus	200s	304		
Processus	c. 30 AD	c. 67 AD	found in Roman Martyrology	
Procopius of Sázava	c. 970	25 March 1053	2 June 1204 by Pope Innocent III or by a liturgical elevation and translation of his body to the altar in Sázava	
Proculus of Bologna	200s	304	found in Roman Martyrology	
Proculus of Pozzuoli	200s	c. 305		
Prosdocimus	0s	c. 7 November 100 AD	found in Roman Martyrology	
Prospero of Tarragona	600s	718	4 May 1854 (equipollent) by Pope Pius IX	
Protasius Chong Kukbo	1799	20 May 1839	6 May 1984 by Pope John Paul II	One of the Korean Martyrs
Protus	200s	c. 257–259	found in Roman Martyrology	
Ptolemaeus	unknown	c. 165	found in Roman Martyrology	
Publius	33 AD	c. 125	found in Roman Martyrology	
Pudens	unknown	0s	found in Roman Martyrology	
Pudentiana	unknown	100s	found in Roman Martyrology	
Pusai	unknown	344		
Quadratus of Africa	unknown	unknown	found in Roman Martyrology	
Quadratus of Athens	unknown	129	found in Roman Martyrology	
Quirinus of Neuss	unknown	30 March 116	found in Roman Martyrology	
Quirinus of Sescia	200s	309		
Rafael Arnáiz Barón	9 April 1911	26 April 1938	11 October 2009 by Pope Benedict XVI	
Rafael Guízar y Valencia	26 April 1878	6 June 1938	15 October 2006 by Pope Benedict XVI	
Rafaela Porras Ayllón	1 March 1850	6 January 1925	23 January 1977 by Pope Paul VI	
Rafqa Pietra Choboq Ar-Rayès	29 June 1832	23 March 1914	10 June 2001 by Pope John Paul II	
Rainerius	c. 1115 or 1117	c. 1160	found in Roman Martyrology	
Rais	200s	303		
Ralph Sherwin	25 October 1550	1 December 1581	25 October 1970 by Pope Paul VI	One of the Forty Martyrs of England and Wales
Raphael Kalinowski	1 September 1835	15 November 1907	17 November 1991 by Pope John Paul II	
Raphael Massabki	1800s	10 July 1860	20 October 2024 by Pope Francis	
Raymond Li Quanzhen	c. 1841	30 June 1900	1 October 2000 by Pope John Paul II	One of the Martyr Saints of China
Raymond Nonnatus	1204	31 August 1240	13 August 1669 (equipollent) by Pope Clement IX	
Raymond of Penyafort	c. 1175	6 January 1275	29 April 1601 by Pope Clement VIII	Spanish Dominican friar
Raynerius of Split	c. 1100	1180		
Regina	200s	c. 286	found in Roman Martyrology	Martyr
Reginald of Picardy	1000s	1104	1 October 1868 by Pope Pius IX	
Relindis of Maaseik	unknown	750		
Remigius	c. 437	13 January 533	found in Roman Martyrology	
Rémy Isoré, S.J.	22 January 1852	19 June 1900	1 October 2000 by Pope John Paul II	One of the Martyr Saints of China
René Goupil	15 May 1608	29 September 1642	29 June 1930 by Pope Pius XI	One of the Canadian Martyrs
Respicius	unknown	c. 250	found in Roman Martyrology	
Richard Gwyn	c. 1537	15 October 1584	25 October 1970 by Pope Paul VI	One of the Forty Martyrs of England and Wales
Richard of Chichester	c. 1197	3 April 1253	25 January 1262 by Pope Urban IV	
Richard Pampuri	2 August 1897	1 March 1930	1 November 1989 by Pope John Paul II	
Richard Reynolds	c. 1492	4 May 1535	25 October 1970 by Pope Paul VI	One of the Forty Martyrs of England and Wales
Richard the Pilgrim	600s	722		
Rigobert	600s	c. 743	found in Roman Martyrology	
Rita of Cascia	c. 1381	22 May 1457	24 May 1900 by Pope Leo XIII	
Robert Bellarmine	4 October 1542	17 September 1621	29 June 1930 by Pope Pius XI	Doctor of the church
Robert Lawrence	c. 1485	4 May 1535	25 October 1970 by Pope Paul VI	One of the Forty Martyrs of England and Wales
Robert of Molesme	1028	17 April 1111	1222 by Pope Honorius III	
Robert Southwell	c. 1561	21 February 1595	25 October 1970 by Pope Paul VI	One of the Forty Martyrs of England and Wales
Roch	c. 1348	15 or 16 August 1376 or 1379	found in Roman Martyrology, added by Pope Gregory XIV (1590–1591)	
Roderick	700s	13 March 837		
Roderick of Córdoba	unknown	13 March 857	found in Roman Martyrology	One of the Martyrs of Córdoba
Rodobald Cepolla	unknown	12 October 1254	20 December 1888 (equipollent) by Pope Leo XIII	
Rodrigo Aguilar Alemán	13 March 1875	28 October 1927	21 May 2000 by Pope John Paul II	One of the Saints of the Cristero War
Rogellus of Córdoba	unknown	16 September 852	found in Roman Martyrology	One of the Martyrs of Córdoba
Rögnvald Kali Kolsson	c. 1103	20 August 1158	1192 by Pope Celestine III	Layperson of the Diocese of Caithness
Román Adame Rosales	27 February 1859	21 April 1927	21 May 2000 by Pope John Paul II	One of the Saints of the Cristero War
Romanus of Caesarea	200s	c. 303	found in Roman Martyrology	
Romanus Ostiarius	unknown	c. 258	found in Roman Martyrology	
Romaric	unknown	653	3 December 1049 by Pope Leo IX	
Romuald	c. 951	19 June 1027	1582 by Pope Gregory XIII	
Romulus	0s	117	found in Roman Martyrology	Martyr
Roque González y de Santa Cruz	17 November 1576	15 November 1628	16 May 1988 by Pope John Paul II	
Rosa Francisca Dolors Molas Vallvé	7 November 1854	9 February 1910	11 December 1988 by Pope John Paul II	
Rosa Kim Nosa	1784	20 July 1839	6 May 1984 by Pope John Paul II	One of the Korean Martyrs
Rose Chen Aijie	c. 1878	5 July 1900	1 October 2000 by Pope John Paul II	One of the Martyr Saints of China
Rose Fan Hui	c. 1855	16 August 1900	1 October 2000 by Pope John Paul II	One of the Martyr Saints of China
Rose of Lima	20 April 1586	24 August 1617	12 April 1671 by Pope Clement X	
Rose of Viterbo	c. 1233	6 March 1251	1457 by Pope Callistus III	
Rose Philippine Duchesne	29 August 1769	18 November 1852	3 July 1988 by Pope John Paul II	Professed religious of the Society of the Religious of the Sacred Heart of Jesus
Rose Venerini	9 February 1655	7 May 1728	15 October 2006 by Pope Benedict XVI	Founder of the Religious Teachers Venerini (Venerini Sisters)
Rose Zhao	c. 1878	late July 1900	1 October 2000 by Pope John Paul II	One of the Martyr Saints of China
Rudesind	26 November 907	1 March 977	1195 by Pope Celestine III	
Rufina	200s	257	found in Roman Martyrology	
Rufus of Metz	300s	400	found in Roman Martyrology	
Rupert of Bingen	712	732		
Rupert of Salzburg	c. 660	27 March 710	found in Roman Martyrology	
Sabás Reyes Salazar	5 December 1883	13 April 1927	21 May 2000 by Pope John Paul II	One of the Saints of the Cristero War
Sabbas the Goth	334	372	found in Roman Martyrology	
Sabbas the Sanctified	439	5 December 532	found in Roman Martyrology	
Sabina	unknown	c. 126 AD	found in Roman Martyrology	
Sabinian of Córdoba	unknown	7 June 851	found in Roman Martyrology	One of the Martyrs of Córdoba
Sagar of Laodicea	unknown	175	found in Roman Martyrology	
Solomon Leclercq	15 November 1745	2 September 1792	16 October 2016 by Pope Francis	
Salonius	400	400s		
Salvador Lara Puente	13 August 1905	15 August 1926	21 May 2000 by Pope John Paul II	One of the Saints of the Cristero War
Salvador of Horta	December 1520	18 March 1567	17 April 1938 by Pope Pius XI	
Sameh Salah Farouk	20 May 1988	15 February 2015	found in Roman Martyrology (added on 11 May 2023 by Pope Francis)	Coptic Orthodox, one of the 21 Coptic Christian Martyrs of Libya
Samuel Alhoam Wilson	14 July 1986	15 February 2015	found in Roman Martyrology (added on 11 May 2023 by Pope Francis)	Coptic Orthodox, one of the 21 Coptic Christian Martyrs of Libya
Samuel of Castrovillari	unknown	10 October 1227	22 January 1516 by Pope Leo X	One of the seven Franciscan martyrs of Ceuta
Samuel Stéphanos Kamel	26 November 1992	15 February 2015	found in Roman Martyrology (added on 11 May 2023 by Pope Francis)	Coptic Orthodox, one of the 21 Coptic Christian Martyrs of Libya
Sancha of Portugal	2 February 1264	c. 1302	10 May 1705 by Pope Clement XI	
Sancho of Córdoba	unknown	5 June 851	found in Roman Martyrology	One of the Martyrs of Córdoba
Saturnin	200s	c. 257	11 December 1897 (equipollent) by Pope Leo XIII	
Saturninus of Cagliari	200s	c. 304	found in Roman Martyrology	
Satyrus of Milan	c. 331	378	found in Roman Martyrology	
Sava of Serbia	1169 or 1174	14 January 1235	invoked in 29 September 1993 as a saint by Pope John Paul II	Serbian Orthodox
Savina of Milan	200s	311	found in Roman Martyrology	
Savinian	300s	390	found in Roman Martyrology	
Scholastica	c. 480	10 February 543	found in Roman Martyrology	
Sebaldus	700s	c. 770	26 March 1425 by Pope Martin V	
Sebastian	c. 256	c. 288	found in Roman Martyrology	
Sebastian Nam Igwan	1780	26 September 1839	6 May 1984 by Pope John Paul II	One of the Korean Martyrs
Secunda	200s	257	found in Roman Martyrology	
Secundus of Asti	0s	c. 119	found in Roman Martyrology	
Semproniana of Mataró	unknown	340	13 September 1850 (equipollent) by Pope Pius IX	
Senán mac Geirrcinn	488	500s		
Senator of Milan	unknown	29 May 475	found in Roman Martyrology	
Sennen	100s	c. 250	found in Roman Martyrology	
Septimius of Iesi	200s	307		
Seraphin of Montegranaro	1540	12 October 1604	16 July 1767 by Pope Clement XIII	
Serapia	0s	c. 119	found in Roman Martyrology	
Serapion of Algiers	1179	14 November 1240	14 April 1728 (equipollent) by Pope Benedict XIII	
Serapion of Macedonia	100s	195	found in Roman Martyrology	
Serenus the Gardener	200s	23 February 307	found in Roman Martyrology	
Sergius	unknown	300s	found in Roman Martyrology	
Servandus	200s	c. 305	found in Roman Martyrology	
Servatius of Tongeren	300s	13 May 384	found in Roman Martyrology	
Seraphim of Sarov	30 July 1754	15 January 1833	referred to him in 1994 as a saint by Pope John Paul II	
Servus-Dei of Córdoba	unknown	13 January 852	found in Roman Martyrology	One of the Martyrs of Córdoba
Servus-Dei of the East	unknown	16 September 852	found in Roman Martyrology	One of the Martyrs of Córdoba
Severian of Scythopolis	unknown	21 February 453	found in Roman Martyrology	Bishop of Scythopolis
Severinus of Noricum	c. 410	8 January 482		
Severus of Barcelona	200s	c. 304	found in Roman Martyrology	
Shemon Bar Sabbae	200s	345	found in Roman Martyrology	
Sicarius				
Sidonius Apollinaris	c. 430	481/490		
Sigfrid of Sweden	1000s	1100s	c. 1158 by Pope Hadrian IV	
Sigismund of Burgundy	400s	524	found in Roman Martyrology	
Silas	0s	65–100	found in Roman Martyrology	
Silvia	c. 515	c. 592	found in Roman Martyrology	Mother of Pope Gregory I
Silvin of Auchy	c. 650	15 February 717 or 718	found in Roman Martyrology	
Simão Correia	unknown	3 October 1645	15 October 2017 by Pope Francis	One of the Martyrs of Natal
Simeon	1st century BC	unknown	found in Roman Martyrology	
Simeon of Jerusalem	unknown	c. 107 or 117	found in Roman Martyrology	
Simeon of Mantua	900s	1016	1049 by Pope Leo IX	
Simeon Stylites	c. 390	2 September 459	found in Roman Martyrology	
Siméon-François Berneux	14 May 1814	8 March 1866	6 May 1984 by Pope John Paul II	One of the Korean Martyrs
Simon Chen Ximan	c. 1855	9 July 1900	1 October 2000 by Pope John Paul II	One of the Martyr Saints of China
Simón de Rojas	28 October 1552	29 September 1624	3 July 1988 by Pope John Paul II	
Simon Phan Đắc Hoà	1774	12 December 1840	19 June 1988 by Pope John Paul II	One of the Vietnamese Martyrs
Simon Qin Chunfu	c. 1886	19 July 1900	1 October 2000 by Pope John Paul II	One of the Martyr Saints of China
Simon Stock	c. 1165	16 May 1265	found in Roman Martyrology	
Simon the Zealot	unknown	c. 65 or 107	found in Roman Martyrology	
Simon-Marie-Just Ranfer de Bretenières	28 February 1838	7 March 1866	6 May 1984 by Pope John Paul II	One of the Korean Martyrs
Simpert	700s	13 October 807		
Simplicius	200s	302 or 303	found in Roman Martyrology	
Sisenandus of Beja	unknown	16 July 851	found in Roman Martyrology	One of the Martyrs of Córdoba
Smaragdus	200s	c. 303	found in Roman Martyrology	
Solomon of Córdoba	unknown	13 March 857	found in Roman Martyrology	One of the Martyrs of Córdoba
Sossius	275	19 September 305	found in Roman Martyrology	
Spyridon	c. 270	348	found in Roman Martyrology	
Stachys the Apostle	unknown	c. 54 AD	found in Roman Martyrology	
Stanislaus Kostka	28 October 1550	15 August 1568	31 December 1726 by Pope Benedict XIII	
Stanislaus of Szczepanów	26 July 1030	11 April 1079	17 September 1253 by Pope Innocent IV	
Stanislaus Papczyński	18 May 1631	17 September 1701	5 June 2016 by Pope Francis	Professed priest and founder of the Marians of the Immaculate Conception
Stanisław Kazimierczyk	27 September 1433	3 May 1489	17 October 2010 by Pope Benedict XVI	
Stephen the Protomartyr	5 AD	34 AD	found in Roman Martyrology	
Stephen of Cuneo	1045	14 November 1391	21 June 1970 by Pope Paul VI	Companion of Nicholas Tavelic
Stephen Harding	ca. 1050	28 March 1134		
Stephen I of Hungary	c. 975	15 August 1038	20 August 1083 by Pope Gregory VII	Married layperson of the Archdiocese of Esztergom, king of Hungary
Stephen Min Kuk-ka	1788	20 January 1840	6 May 1984 by Pope John Paul II	One of the Korean Martyrs
Stephen Nguyễn Văn Vinh	c. 1813	19 December 1839	19 June 1988 by Pope John Paul II	One of the Vietnamese Martyrs
Stephen of Muret	c. 1340	8 February 1124	1189 by Pope Clement III	
Stephen of Obazine	1085	8 March 1154	1701 (cultus confirmed) by Pope Clement XI	
Stephen of Perm	1340	26 April 1396	found in Roman Martyrology, added in 2001	Russian Orthodox
Stephen Pongracz	c. 1583	7 September 1619	2 July 1995 by Pope John Paul II	
Stephen the Younger	713 or 715	28 November 764 or 765	found in Roman Martyrology	
Sturm	705	17 December 779	1139 by Pope Innocent II	
Susanna U Surim	1803	20 September 1846	6 May 1984 by Pope John Paul II	One of the Korean Martyrs
Swithun Wells	c. 1536	10 December 1591	25 October 1970 by Pope Paul VI	One of the Forty Martyrs of England and Wales
Syagrius of Nice	unknown	787 or 788		
Sylvester Gozzolini	1177	26 November 1267	1598 by Pope Clement VIII	
Symeon of Trier	980s	1035	5 January 1047 by Pope Clement II	
Symeon the New Theologian	949	12 March 1022		Theologian
Symphorosa	unknown	c. 138	found in Roman Martyrology	
Sunniva	unknown	1000s	found in the liturgical calendar of Norway	
Szymon of Lipnica	c. 1437	18 July 1482	3 June 2007 by Pope Benedict XVI	
Talarican	700s	800s	11 July 1898 (equipollent) by Pope Leo XIII	
Tarachus	200s	304		
Tarcisius	unknown	200s	found in Roman Martyrology	
Tatwine	c. 670	30 July 734		
Taurinus	300s	c. 410	found in Roman Martyrology	
Tawadros Youssef Tawadros	16 September 1968	15 February 2015	found in Roman Martyrology (added on 11 May 2023 by Pope Francis)	Coptic Orthodox, one of the 21 Coptic Christian Martyrs of Libya
Teilo	c. 500	c. 560		
Telemachus	300s	1 January 404 or 391	found in Roman Martyrology	
Terentian	0s	118	found in Roman Martyrology	Bishop of Todi
Teresa Chen Jinjie	c. 1875	5 July 1900	1 October 2000 by Pope John Paul II	One of the Martyr Saints of China
Teresa Jornet Ibars	9 January 1843	26 August 1897	27 January 1974 by Pope Paul VI	
Teresa Kim	1797	9 January 1840	6 May 1984 by Pope John Paul II	One of the Korean Martyrs
Teresa Kim Imi	1811	20 September 1846	6 May 1984 by Pope John Paul II	One of the Korean Martyrs
Teresa Margaret of the Sacred Heart	15 July 1747	7 March 1770	19 March 1934 by Pope Pius XI	Professed religious of the Discalced Carmelite Nuns
Teresa of Ávila	28 March 1515	4 October 1582	12 March 1622 by Pope Gregory XV	
Teresa of Calcutta	26 August 1910	5 September 1997	4 September 2016 by Pope Francis	
Teresa of Saint Augustine Lidoine	22 September 1752	17 July 1794	18 December 2024 by Pope Francis	One of the Martyrs of Compiègne
Teresa of Saint Ignatius Trézel	4 April 1743	17 July 1794	18 December 2024 by Pope Francis	One of the Martyrs of Compiègne
Teresa of the Andes	13 July 1900	12 April 1920	21 March 1993 by Pope John Paul II	
Teresa of the Heart of Mary Hanisset	18 January 1742	17 July 1794	18 December 2024 by Pope Francis	One of the Martyrs of Compiègne
Teresa Yi Maeim	1788	20 July 1839	6 May 1984 by Pope John Paul II	One of the Korean Martyrs
Teresa Zhang Heshi	c. 1864	16 July 1900	1 October 2000 by Pope John Paul II	One of the Martyr Saints of China
Teresa-Marie Soiron	23 January 1748	17 July 1794	18 December 2024 by Pope Francis	One of the Martyrs of Compiègne
Thaddeus Liu	c. 1773	30 November 1823	1 October 2000 by Pope John Paul II	One of the Martyr Saints of China
Thamel	unknown	125	found in Roman Martyrology	
Thecla	30 AD	0s	found in Roman Martyrology	
Thecla of Kitzingen	700s	c. 790 AD	found in Roman Martyrology	
Theobald of Marly	1100s	8 December 1247	29 September 1710 (cultus confirmed) by Pope Clement XI	
Theobald of Provins	1033	30 June 1066	1073 by Pope Alexander II	
Theodemir of Córdoba	unknown	25 July 851	found in Roman Martyrology	One of the Martyrs of Córdoba
Theodora	unknown	120	found in Roman Martyrology	
Theodora of Alexandria	200s	304	found in Roman Martyrology	
Theodore	unknown	130	found in Roman Martyrology	
Théodore Guérin	2 October 1798	14 May 1856	15 October 2006 by Pope Benedict XVI	
Theodore of Amasea	200s	17 February 306	found in Roman Martyrology	
Theodore of der Eem	1499–1502	9 July 1572	29 June 1867 by Pope Pius IX	One of the Martyrs of Gorkum
Theodore of Pavia	unknown	778	found in Roman Martyrology	
Theodore Stratelates	281	319	found in Roman Martyrology	
Theodore the Studite	759	826	found in Roman Martyrology	
Theodoret of Antioch	unknown	22 October 362	found in Roman Martyrology	
Theodoric Balat		9 July 1900	1 October 2000 by Pope John Paul II	One of the Martyr Saints of China
Theodosia of Constantinople	600s	700s		
Theodosia of Tyre	290	2 April 307	found in Roman Martyrology	
Theodosius of Kiev	1029	3 May 1074	found in Roman Martyrology	
Theodotus of Ancyra	200s	c. 303	found in Roman Martyrology	
Theoktiste of Lesbos	800s	800s	found in Roman Martyrology	
Theonas	200s	c. 303	found in Roman Martyrology	
Theopemptus of Nicomedia	200s	c. 303	found in Roman Martyrology	
Théophane Vénard, MEP	21 November 1829	2 February 1861	19 June 1988 by Pope John Paul II	One of the Vietnamese Martyrs
Theophanes the Confessor	758–760	12 March 817	found in Roman Martyrology	
Theophilus of Antioch	100s	183–185	found in Roman Martyrology	
Theopista	0s	118	found in Roman Martyrology	
Theophilus of Corte	30 October 1676	17 June 1740	29 June 1930 by Pope Pius XI	
Theotonius of Coimbra	c.1082	18 February 1162	18 February 1163 by a Portuguese council of bishops, later confirmed by Alexander III	
Theresa of Portugal	4 October 1178	18 June 1250	13 December 1705 by Pope Clement XI	
Thérèse Couderc	1 February 1805	26 September 1885	10 May 1970 by Pope Paul VI	
Thérèse of Lisieux	2 January 1873	30 September 1897	17 May 1925 by Pope Pius XI	
Thomas Aquinas	1225	7 March 1274	18 July 1323 by Pope John XXII	
Thomas Becket	21 December c. 1119	29 December 1170	21 February 1173 by Pope Alexander III	Archbishop of Canterbury
Thomas de Cantilupe	c. 1218	25 August 1282	17 April 1320 by Pope John XXII	
Thomas Đinh Viết Dụ	c. 1783	26 November 1839	19 June 1988 by Pope John Paul II	One of the Vietnamese Martyrs
Thomas Garnet	c. 1575	23 June 1608	25 October 1970 by Pope Paul VI	One of the Forty Martyrs of England and Wales
Thomas Khuong	c. 1789	30 January 1860	19 June 1988 by Pope John Paul II	One of the Vietnamese Martyrs
Thomas Kozaki	1582	5 February 1597	8 June 1862 by Pope Pius IX	One of the 26 Martyrs of Japan
Thomas More	7 February 1478	6 July 1535	19 May 1935 by Pope Pius XI	
Thomas Nguyễn Văn Đệ	c. 1811	19 December 1839	19 June 1988 by Pope John Paul II	One of the Vietnamese Martyrs
Thomas of Villanova	1488	8 September 1555	1 November 1658 by Pope Alexander VII	
Thomas Rokuzayemon	1590	17 November 1634	18 October 1987 by Pope John Paul II	One of the 16 Martyrs of Japan
Thomas Shen Jihe	c. 1851	9 July 1900	1 October 2000 by Pope John Paul II	One of the Martyr Saints of China
Thomas Son Chasuhn	1838	30 March 1866	6 May 1984 by Pope John Paul II	One of the Korean Martyrs
Thomas the Apostle	0s	3 July 72 AD	found in Roman Martyrology	
Thomas Toán	c. 1764	27 June 1840	19 June 1988 by Pope John Paul II	One of the Vietnamese Martyrs
Thomas Trần Văn Thiện	c. 1820	21 September 1838	19 June 1988 by Pope John Paul II	One of the Vietnamese Martyrs
Thomas Xico	1500s	5 February 1597	8 June 1862 by Pope Pius IX	One of the 26 Martyrs of Japan
Thraseas	unknown	170	found in Roman Martyrology	Bishop of Eumania
Tiburtius of Rome	unknown	c. 260	found in Roman Martyrology	
Timothy	c. 17 AD	c. 97 AD	found in Roman Martyrology	
Titus	0s	96 or 107 AD	found in Roman Martyrology	
Titus Brandsma	23 February 1881	26 July 1942	15 May 2022 by Pope Francis	
Tola of Clonard	600s	700s		
Tommaso da Cori	4 June 1655	11 January 1729	21 November 1999 by Pope John Paul II	Professed priest of the Franciscan Friars Minor
Toribio Romo González	16 April 1900	25 February 1928	21 May 2000 by Pope John Paul II	One of the Saints of the Cristero War
Torpes of Pisa	unknown	c. 65 AD	found in Roman Martyrology	
Tranquilino Ubiarco Robles	8 July 1899	5 October 1928	21 May 2000 by Pope John Paul II	One of the Saints of the Cristero War
Tryphon	unknown	c. 250	found in Roman Martyrology	
Turibius of Mogrovejo	16 November 1538	23 March 1606	10 December 1726 by Pope Benedict XIII	Archbishop of Lima
Ubald	c. 1084	1160	4 March 1192 by Pope Celestine III	Bishop of Gubbio
Ubaldesca Taccini	1136	1206	found in Roman Martyrology	
Ugolino of Cerisano	unknown	10 October 1227	22 January 1516 by Pope Leo X	One of the seven Franciscan martyrs of Ceuta
Ulrich of Augsburg	893	4 July 973	4 July 993 by Pope John XV	The first saint to be canonized not by a local authority but by the Pope.
Urban of Langres	327	c. 390	found in Roman Martyrology	
Ursicinus of Ravenna	unknown	c. 67 AD	found in Roman Martyrology	
Ursmar	600s	713	found in Roman Martyrology	
Ursula	300s	21 October 383	found in Roman Martyrology	
Ursula Ledóchowska	17 April 1865	29 May 1939	18 May 2003 by Pope John Paul II	
Ursus of Auxerre	400s	508	found in Roman Martyrology	
Valentin de Berriochoa	14 February 1827	1 November 1861	19 June 1988 by Pope John Paul II	One of the Vietnamese Martyrs
Valentine	226	14 February 269	found in Roman Martyrology	
Valerian of Rome	unknown	c. 260	found in Roman Martyrology	
Venantius of Camerino	200s	c. 250	found in Roman Martyrology	
Verdiana	1182	10 February 1242	found in Roman Martyrology	
Vergilius of Salzburg	700	27 November 784	1233 by Pope Gregory IX	
Veronica	0s	0s	comemmorated in older Ambrosian missals before the late 16th century	
Veronica Giuliani	27 December 1660	9 July 1727	26 May 1839 by Pope Gregory XVI	
Viator of Bergamo	unknown	370		
Vicenta María López i Vicuña	24 March 1847	26 December 1890	25 May 1975 by Pope Paul VI	
Vicente de Souza Pereira	unknown	3 October 1645	15 October 2017 by Pope Francis	One of the Martyrs of Natal
Vicente Liem de la Paz	1732	7 November 1773	19 June 1988 by Pope John Paul II	One of the Vietnamese Martyrs
Victoria	200s	250	found in Roman Martyrology	
Victoria of Albitina	200s	304		
Victoriano Pío	7 July 1905	9 October 1934	21 November 1999 by Pope John Paul II	One of the Martyrs of Turon
Victorinus of Pettau	200s	303–304	found in Roman Martyrology	
Viktor of Xanten	unknown	300s	found in Roman Martyrology	
Villanus	1100s	1237		
Vincent de Paul	24 April 1581	27 September 1660	16 June 1737 by Pope Clement XII	
Vincent Đỗ Yến	c. 1764	30 June 1838	19 June 1988 by Pope John Paul II	One of the Vietnamese Martyrs
Vincent Dương	c. 1821	6 June 1862	19 June 1988 by Pope John Paul II	One of the Vietnamese Martyrs
Vincent Ferrer	23 January 1350	5 April 1419	3 June 1455 by Pope Callixtus III	
Vincent Nguyễn Thế Điểm	c. 1761	24 November 1838	19 June 1988 by Pope John Paul II	One of the Vietnamese Martyrs
Vincent of Lérins	300s	c. 445	found in Roman Martyrology	
Vincent of Saragossa	200s	c. 304	found in Roman Martyrology	
Vincent Pallotti	21 April 1795	22 January 1850	20 January 1963 by Pope John XXIII	
Vincent Romano	3 June 1751	20 December 1831	14 October 2018 by Pope Francis	
Vincent Shiwozuka	c.1576	29 September 1637	18 October 1987 by Pope John Paul II	One of the 16 Martyrs of Japan
Vincent Strambi	1 January 1745	1 January 1824	11 June 1950 by Pope Pius XII	Professed priest of the Passionists; Bishop of Macerata
Vincent Tường	c. 1814	16 June 1862	19 June 1988 by Pope John Paul II	One of the Vietnamese Martyrs
Vincenza Gerosa	29 October 1784	29 June 1847	18 May 1950 by Pope Pius XII	Cofounder of the Sisters of Charity of Saint Bartolomea Capitanio and Vincenza Gerosa (Sisters of Holy Child Mary)
Vincenzo Grossi	9 March 1845	7 November 1917	18 October 2015 by Pope Francis	Priest of the Vicariate of Rome; founder of the Society of the Catholic Apostolate (Pallottines), the Pallottine Missionary Sisters and the Pallottine Sisters of the Catholic Apostolate
Virginia Centurione Bracelli	2 April 1587	15 December 1651	18 May 2003 by Pope John Paul II	
Vitalis	200s	c. 304	found in Roman Martyrology	
Vitus	c. 290	c. 303	found in Roman Martyrology	
Vladimir the Great	c. 958	15 July 1015		Grand Prince of Kiev
Walabonsus of Córdoba	unknown	7 June 851	found in Roman Martyrology	One of the Martyrs of Córdoba
Walfrid	unknown	15 February 765	12 September 1861 (equipollent) by Pope Pius IX	
Walpurga	c. 710	25 February 777 or 779		
Walter of Pontoise	c. 1030	c. 1099		
Wenceslaus	c. 911	28 September 935	found in Roman Martyrology	
Wendelin of Trier	c. 554	c. 617		
Wiborada	800s	926	5 January 1047 by Pope Clement II	
Wihtberht	7 May 675	13 August 747		
Wihtburh	unknown	17 March 743		
Wilfrid	c. 633	709 or 710		
Wilfrid II	unknown	29 April 745 or 746		
Wilgils	c. 630	600s		
Willehad	c. 735	8 November 789		
Willehad of Denmark	1482	9 July 1572	29 June 1867 by Pope Pius IX	One of the Martyrs of Gorkum
William of Breteuil	1000s	1130		
William of Donjeon	c. 1140	10 January 1209	17 May 1218 by Pope Honorius III	
William of Gellone	755	28 May 812 or 814	1066 by Pope Alexander II	
William of Maleval	unknown	10 February 1157	8 May 1202 by Pope Innocent III	
William of Perth	1100s	c. 1201	1256 by Pope Alexander IV	
William of Roskilde	unknown	1073 or 1074	21 January 1224 by Pope Honorius III	
William of York	1000s	8 June 1154	1227 by Pope Honorius III	
William Pinchon	c. 1175	29 July 1234	24 March 1247 by Pope Innocent IV	
Willibald	c. 700	c. 787		
Willibrord	c. 658	7 November 739		
Wistremundus of Córdoba	unknown	7 June 851	found in Roman Martyrology	One of the Martyrs of Córdoba
Witesindus of Córdoba	unknown	855	found in Roman Martyrology	One of the Martyrs of Córdoba
Wolfgang of Regensburg	934	31 October 994	8 October 1051 by Pope Leo IX	
Wolfhelm of Brauweiler	1000s	1091		Professed priest of the Benedictines
Wulfram of Sens	c. 640	20 March 703		
Wulfstan	1008	January 1095	14 May 1203 by Pope Innocent III	
Yangzhi Lang	c. 1871	16 July 1900	1 October 2000 by Pope John Paul II	One of the Martyr Saints of China
Yousef Shokry Younan	2 June 1990	15 February 2015	found in Roman Martyrology (added on 11 May 2023 by Pope Francis)	Coptic Orthodox, one of the 21 Coptic Christian Martyrs of Libya
Zacchaeus of Jerusalem	0s	116	found in Roman Martyrology	
Zacharias of Vienne	0s	106	found in Roman Martyrology	
Zanitas of Bardiaboch	200s	27 March 326		
Zdislava Berka	c. 1220	1252	21 May 1995 by Pope John Paul II	
Zeno of Verona	300	12 April 371	found in Roman Martyrology	
Zhang Huailu	c. 1843	9 July 1900	1 October 2000 by Pope John Paul II	One of the Martyr Saints of China
Zita	c. 1212	27 April 1272	5 September 1696 (equipollent) by Pope Innocent XII	
Zoe	unknown	127	found in Roman Martyrology	
Zoilus	200s	304	found in Roman Martyrology	
Zosimus	93 AD	110	found in Roman Martyrology	
Zygmunt Gorazdowski	1 November 1845	1 January 1920	23 October 2005 by Pope Benedict XVI	
Zygmunt Szczęsny Feliński	1 November 1822	17 September 1895	11 October 2009 by Pope Benedict XVI	

== Archangels ==
- Michael
- Raphael
- Gabriel

== Old Testament ==
The following are Old Testament figures listed in the Roman Martyrology (both old and new publications):

- Aaron
- Abraham
- All Holy Ancestors of Christ (names unspecified)
- Amos
- Azariah (Abednego)
- David
- Daniel
- Eleazar
- Elijah
- Elisha
- Ezekiel
- Ezra
- Gideon
- Habakkuk
- Haggai
- Hananiah (Shadrach)
- Holy Maccabean Martyrs (the seven brothers and their mother)
- Hosea
- Isaiah
- Jeremiah
- Job
- Joel
- Jonah
- Joshua
- Melchizedek
- Micah
- Mishael (Meshach)
- Moses
- Nahum
- Obadiah
- Samuel
- Zechariah
- Zephaniah

Aside from the above, other Old Testament figures are also commemmorated in the Eastern Catholic Churches, such as the Ruthenian Catholic Church and the Syro-Malabar Catholic Church. They are:

- Adam
- Abel
- Baruch
- Enoch
- Isaac
- Jacob
- Noah
- Seth
- Tobit

== Martyrs ==
The following are an incomplete list of the martyrs venerated by the Catholic Church not individually named in the list above:

- The Holy Innocents (1 AD)
- First Martyrs of the Church of Rome (64 AD)
- Scillitan Martyrs (180)
- Massa Candida (253–260)
- Martyrs of Abitinae (304)
- Thirty Martyrs of the Appian Way (c. 304) — found in Roman Martyrology
- 20,000 Martyrs of Nicomedia (304–305)
- Forty Martyrs of Sebaste (320)
- Martyrs of Persia under Shapur II (300s)
- Martyrs of Eigg - Aside from Donnán of Eigg, 52 other martyr saints are unnamed
- Martyrs of Otranto (1480) - among the 813 martyrs, all are unnamed except for St. Antonio Primaldo
- Martyrs of Natal (1645) - among the 30 martyrs, the unnamed twelve killed on 3 October 1645 were the 7 lay companions of St. João Martins, the wife of St. Manuel Rodrigues de Moura, the daughter of St. Antônio Vilela, 2 daughters of St. Estêvão Machado de Miranda, and the daughter of Francisco Dias.

== See also ==
- Calendar of saints
- Candidates for sainthood
- Chronological list of saints and blesseds
- List of blesseds
- List of canonizations
- List of Christian martyrs
- List of early Christian saints
- List of Old Covenant saints in the Roman Martyrology
- List of Russian saints
- List of saints of Ireland
- List of Servants of God
- List of venerable people (Catholic)
- Martyrology
- Military saint
- Patron saint
- Saint symbology
- Saints in Anglicanism
- Saints in Methodism
