= List of Norbertine saints and beatified people =

The following list includes saints of the Catholic Church and those officially beatified by the Church (beati) who belonged to the Premonstratensians.

== Saints ==
- Norbert of Xanten (1080/1085–1134), Founder of the Order
- Gottfried of Cappenberg (1096–1127), Founder of Cappenberg Monastery
- Frederick of Hallum († 1175), Founder and Abbot of Mariengaarde Monastery
- Evermode of Ratzeburg († 1178), Bishop
- Ludolph of Ratzeburg († 1250), Bishop
- Isfrid of Ratzeburg († 1204), Bishop
- Hermann Joseph von Steinfeld (ca. 1150–1241/1252), Mystic
- Adrian Jansen (1528–1572), Martyr
- Jakob Lacoupe (1542–1572), Martyr
- Gilbert de Neuffonts (ca. 1076–1152), Abbot
- Siard († 1230), Abbot of Mariengaarde

== Blesseds ==
- Hugues de Fosses (1093–1164), Abbot of Prémontré
- Hroznata of Ovenec (1160/70–1217), Martyr
- Gertrude of Aldenberg (1227–1297), Abbess
- Bronislava of Poland (1203–1259), Noblewoman, Benefactress
- Pierre-Adrien Toulorge (1757–1793), Martyr
- Franz Alexander Kern (1897–1924), Priest
