= Godfried Coart =

Christian saint (1512–1572)

Saint Godfried of Mervel O.F.M.
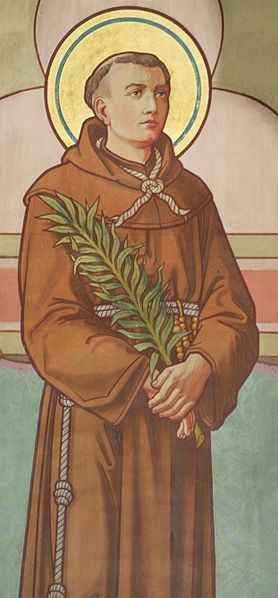

Religious, priest and martyr
- Born: Melveren
- Died: 9 July 1572; Brielle, Spanish Netherlands
- Beatified: 14 November 1675 by Pope Clement X
- Canonized: 29 June 1865 by Pope Pius IX
- Major shrine: Brielle, South Holland, Netherlands
- Feast: 9 July

Godfried Coart {Godfried van Melveren} (1512 – July 9, 1572) was a Franciscan friar and one of the martyrs of Gorkum. He is honored as the first canonized saint of Belgium.

== Life ==
Godfried Coart was born in a house on the Keelstraat in Melveren in 1512 and baptized in Holy Trinity Church. After completing studies at the Franciscan college at 's-Hertogenbosch, he was ordained a priest. He served as sacristan and confessor at the Franciscan friary in Gorinchem where he was very popular with the local people. He printed pictures of the saints that he distributed. He also painted.

== The Dutch Wars ==
During the Dutch Revolt against Spanish rule, inhabitants of the northern Netherlands who were primarily Protestant began to turn against the Catholic priests and monastics present. On June 26, 1572, Father Nicolaes Pieck, guardian of the Franciscan monastery of Gorcum, gave permission to those who wished to do so to seek safer havens. Only two fathers did so. The next day Protestant rebels, the Watergeuzen {pirates) seized Gorinchem and captured eleven Franciscans, along with other religious. The clergy were especially targeted by the Geuzen.

After about ten days imprisonment, they were transferred to Brielle where they were offered their freedom in return for denying Catholic teaching on the Eucharist and papal primacy. Four of the twenty-three captives did so.

Their fate was set. Despite a letter from the Prince of Orange, William the Silent, which enjoined all those in authority to leave priests and religious unmolested, they were subjected to a mock trial, and on July 9, 1572 hanged in a turfshed at a burned out monastery in nearby Rugge. With the rope around his neck, Friar Godfried forgave his killers. Their bodies were mutilated before or after death and buried in a ditch until they were translated to the Franciscan church in Brussels in 1616.

== Veneration ==
Godfried and the other Martyrs of Gorcum were beatified in 1675 and canonized in 1867 as "Saint Nicholas Pieck and his companions". His feast day, with them, is July 9. For many years the place of their martyrdom in Brielle has been the scene of pilgrimages and processions. A reliquary of their remains is housed in the Church of Saint Nicholas, in Brussels. There is a statue of Saint Godfried in St. Rumbold's Cathedral, Mechelen. The Stieltjeskerk in Rotterdam was dedicated to the martyrs. It was closed and demolished in 1976.

The street where Melveren Castle stands has been renamed Sint-Godfriedstraat. Around 1700, a bluestone chapel in honor of Saint Godfried was erected at the corner of the Schoolstraat in Melveren. The chapel was later relocated to Sint-Godfriedstraat.

In 1989, residents of Keelstraat installed a chapel along the meadow that used to border on Godfried's birthplace. An open-air mass used to be celebrated there annually on July 9, followed by a party for all present.

The Friars Minor Museum in Sint-Truiden holds a painting by Godfried.

After Godfried's martyrdom, the Coart family developed a particular reverence for him. Since then, the family father has always been given the first name Godfried.
