= De Muyser Lantwyck family =

Belgian family

de Muyser Lantwyck
- Blazon: per pale: to dexter, Sable, a seated Argent cat, the head posed of face, the front leg dexter posed on a Gules mouse; to sinister, Argent, a fleur-de-lis Sable, a chief Or with three pals Gules; at the border composed of sixteen pieces of Gules and Argent, the compons of Gules loaded with a sword Argent and garnished Or placed in a bar, the tip down, the compons of Argent charged with a lion issuing Gules, armed and langued Azure..
- Parent family: Seven Noble Houses of Brussels
- Country: Duchy of Brabant
- Founded: 15th century
- Motto: Suaviter sed fortiter (Gentle but strongly)

The de Muyser Lantwyck family is an old Belgian family dating back to the beginning of the 15th century, tracing its roots to Jean Moyser, alderman of Vaelbeek (duchy of Brabant), who held lands in Héverlé in 1451, censier of the Groenendael Priory, lord holding the lands and manor of Cockelberg by lease dated 19 June 1438, husband of Aleyde Crabbé.

== History ==
The son of Jean I, Gilles de Muyser, bought, in 1472, the manor of Hoff ten Rode in Bierbeek. His grandson, Jean II de Muyser, is son of Godefroid and brother of Pierre, is cited in 1494 and 1509 in the book of the fiefs of Héverlé as feudataire of Philippe de Croÿ, lord of Héverlé.

He married Ida de Lantwyck, daughter of Wautier before 1500. According to the aforementioned book of fiefs, Jean de Muyser died on 20 July 1531.

His descendants stayed in Vaalbeek, where the family remained, for every generation until the early 18th century, aldermen. These local offices were most likely given to the family as a souvenir of the lordship that was lost by Jean de Muyser's family. Indeed, a charter by Philip the Good dated to 1452 is kept at the Arenberg archives of the university of Louvain, tells us that Wautier de Lantwyck, father of Ida, definitively renounces in 1452, along with his siblings, all rights to the lordship of Vaalbeek that their father Jean was lord of until 1429. This lordship belonged to them through their grandfather, the knight Jean de Lantwyck, who had exchanged it for the lordship of Blanden. We know that the knight of Lanwyck, lord of Blanden, had sold the cense of half of the lordship of Blanden in 1388 to the Parc Abbey, but what happened to the other half remains a mystery.

== Members ==
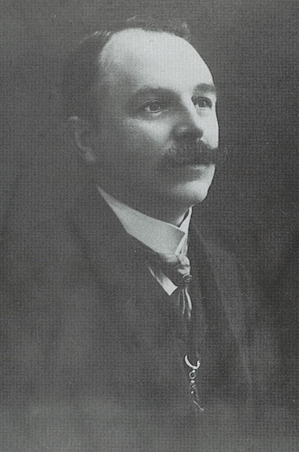
Albert-Walter Demuyser (1870–1917)

Between the 15th and 18th centuries, Muyser's family gave two aldermen and a burgomaster to Vaalbeek as well as an alderman to Neervelp :

- John II de Muyser, alderman of Vaalbeek
- John III de Muyser, alderman of Vaalbeek
- John IV de Muyser, burgomaster of Vaalbeek about 1636, collector of ordinance in 1639, alderman in 1642 and 1644 and dorpmeester in 1649
- Pierre de Muyser, alderman of Neervelp, from 1753 to 1762

From the 19th to the 20th century:

- Albert-Walther Demuyser (1870–1917), postmaster

From the 20th to the 21st century:

- Albert Demuyser (1920–2003), painter and racehorse owner

== The Seven Noble Houses of Brussels ==
The Seven Noble Houses of Brussels (French: sept lignages de Bruxelles, Dutch: zeven geslachten van Brussel) were the seven families of Brussels whose descendants formed the patrician class of that city, and to whom special privileges in the government of that city were granted until the end of the Ancien Régime.

The six houses from which the family descend :

- House of Sweerts
- House of Coudenbergh
- House of Roodenbeke
- House of Sleeus
- House of Serhuyghs
- House of Steenweeghs

== Allied families ==
- Poot family
- Coart family

== Authority ==
Content in this edit is translated from the existing French Wikipedia article at fr:Famille de Muyser Lantwyck; see its history for attribution.
