= Anthony of Weert =

Franciscan friar and priest (1523–1572)

Saint Anthony of Weert O.F.M.
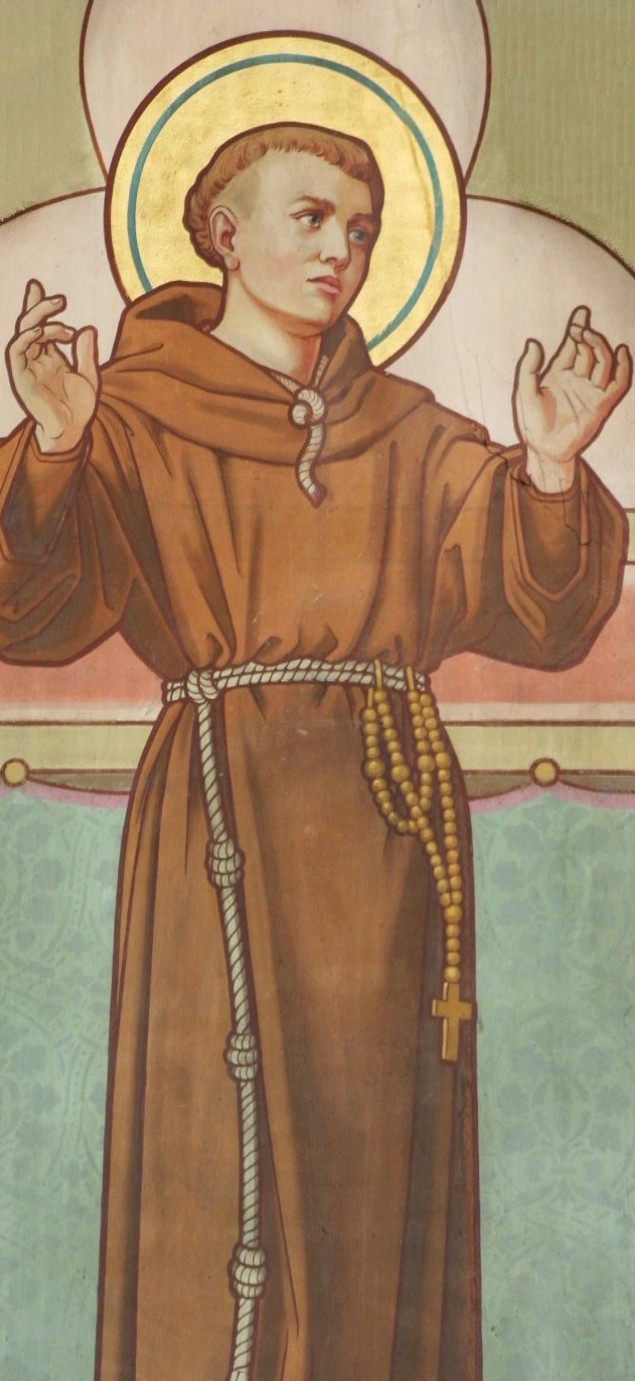

Religious, priest and martyr
- Born: 1523
- Died: 9 July 1572
- Venerated in: Roman Catholic Church
- Beatified: 14 November 1675, Rome, Papal States by Pope Clement X
- Canonized: 29 June 1867, Rome, Papal States by Pope Pius IX
- Feast: 9 July

Anthony of Weert was a Franciscan friar and priest who was martyred during the Dutch Revolt. Eighteen other men were martyred alongside him; they are known as the Martyrs of Gorkum.

The Martyrs of Gorkum were all beatified in 1675 and then canonised by Pope Pius IX in 1867. The martyrs share a feast day on 9 July.

== History ==
Anthony of Weert was a Franciscan friar and priest who belonged to the Convent of Gorcum.

Anthony was taken by Calvinists alongside 18 other individuals, 11 of those were his Franciscan brothers. On 9 July 1572, they were martyred.

== See also ==
- Martyrs of Gorkum
- Franciscan Friars
- Dutch Revolt
