= John of Cologne =

Dominican friar, priest and martyr (d. 1572)

Saint John of Cologne O.P.
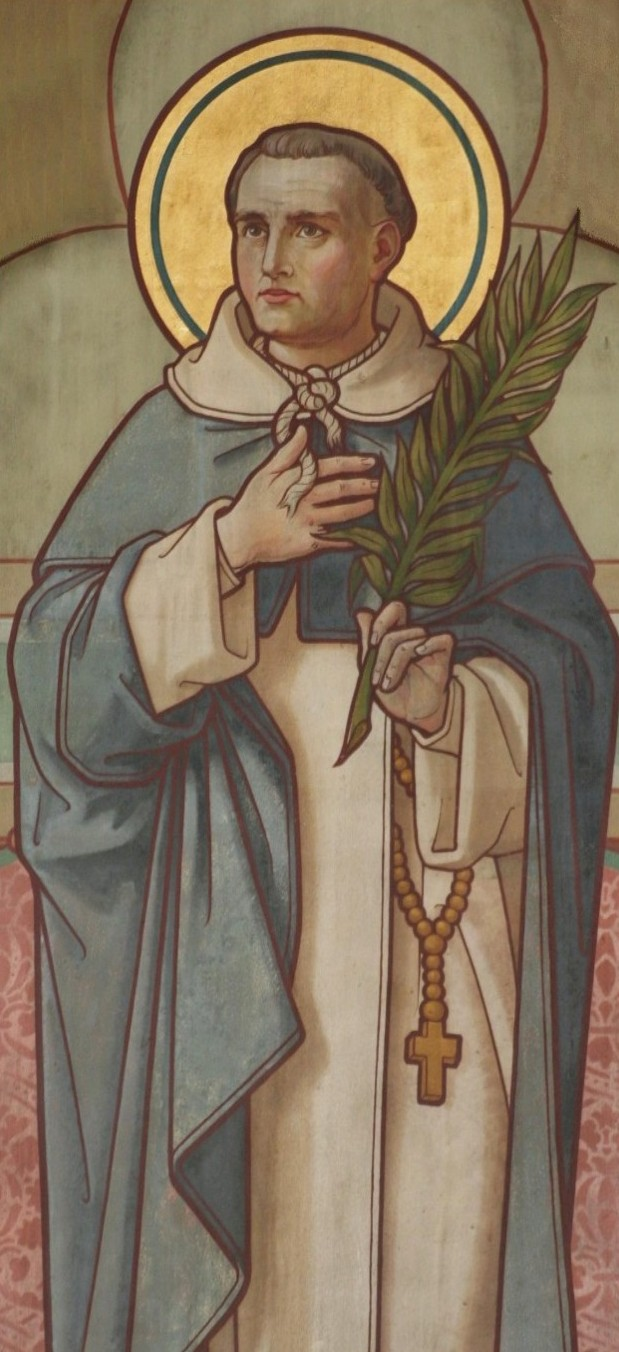

Religious, priest and martyr
- Born: Electorate of Cologne
- Died: 9 July 1572; Brielle, Spanish Netherlands
- Beatified: 14 November 1675 by Pope Clement X
- Canonized: 29 June 1865 by Pope Pius IX
- Major shrine: Bedevaarts Church, Brielle, South Holland, Netherlands
- Feast: 9 July

John of Cologne (Joannes van Hoornaar) was a friar and priest of the Dominican Order, born in the Electorate of Cologne, part of modern Germany. He later became a parish priest of Hoornaar, in the Spanish Netherlands.

== Background ==
In the period 1550-1560 the Dutch Provinces were trying to gain their independence from the Spanish empire of King Philip II.

The Geuzen (Sea Beggars) were adventurers, pirates and patriots who fought against the Spanish rule in the Dutch provinces. For several years their bases of operation included the ports of Emden (on the coast of the Dutch Province Friesland), La Rochelle (on the coast of France) and Dover (on the coast of England). The Sea Beggars attacked vessels of almost any nation as well as fishing villages and towns on the coast of the Dutch Provinces.

== Life ==
All that is known of John's early life is that he attended the University of Cologne, then recognized as one of the best educational institutions in Europe. He entered the Dominican Order at Cologne and received his formation there. After completing his education, John was assigned to a parish in the Netherlands village of Hoornaar, where he served for the next twenty years. executed for his faith in 1572 and has been declared a martyr and saint by the Catholic Church.

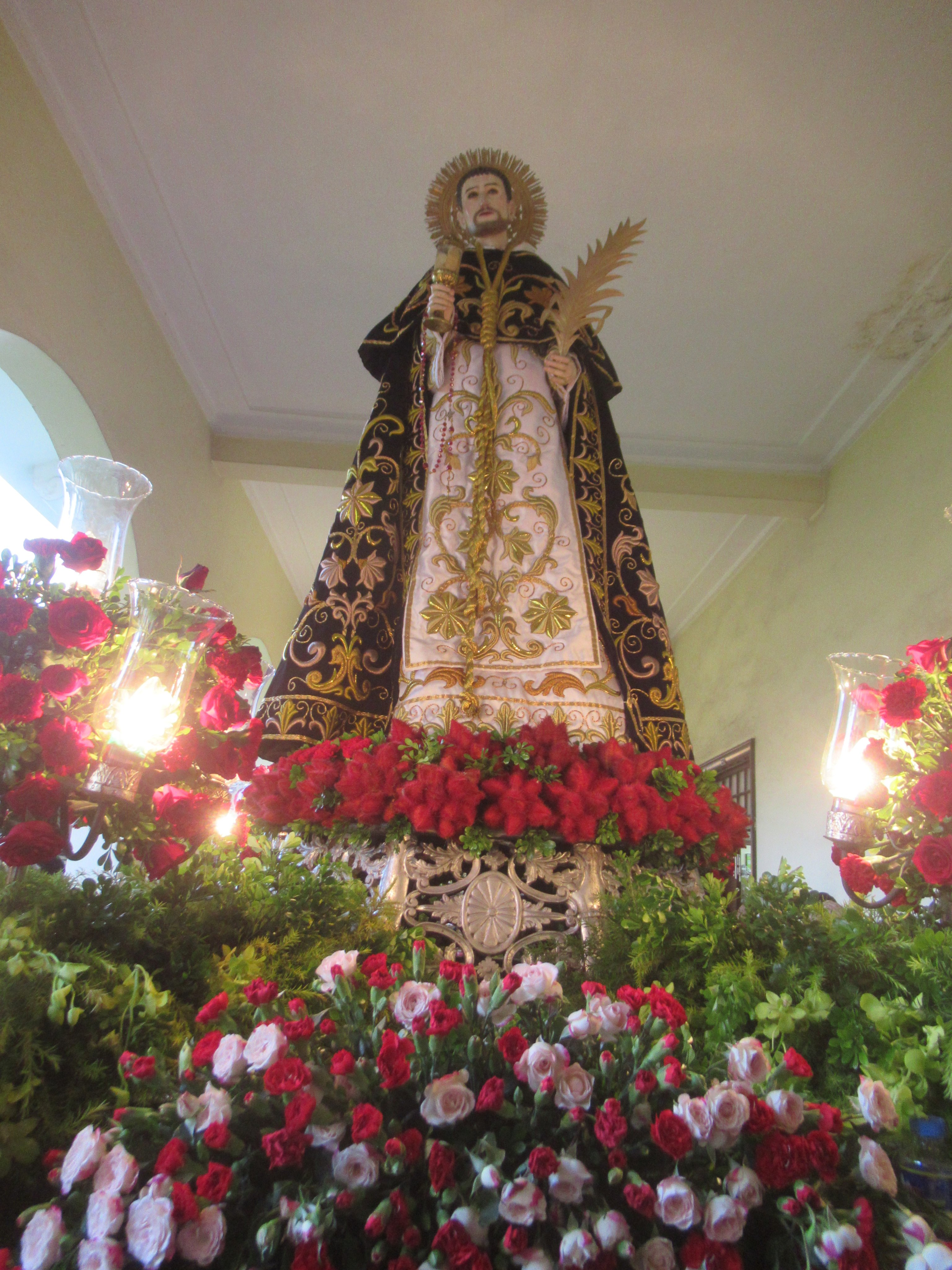
John of Cologne (Philippines)

By 1572, Lutheranism and Calvinism had spread through a great part of Europe. In the Netherlands this was followed by a struggle between the two denominations in which Calvinism was victorious. On 1 April of that year Calvinists and a group called the Watergeuzen (Sea Beggars) conquered Brielle (Den Briel) and later Flushing. In June of that year, Dordrecht and Gorkum also fell into their hands. There they arrested all the Catholic clergy and held them in confinement, in an attempt to get them to deny the Catholic beliefs on the Eucharist and papal primacy.

As John became aware of what had happened to his fellow priests, he disguised himself and attempted to bring them the comfort of the sacraments. He secretly ministered to the captives but was eventually found out and also taken captive. These nineteen were imprisoned in Gorkum from June 26 until July 6, undergoing much abuse. Meanwhile, a letter from William the Silent, Prince of Orange, enjoined all those in authority to leave priests and religious unmolested. Nevertheless Lumey, the commander of the Watergeuzen, ordered them to be hanged on the night of 9 July, in a turfshed, after cruel tortures.

They are referred by the Roman Catholic Church as the Martyrs of Gorkum.

The group was canonized by Pope Pius IX in 1867. Their remains are honored at a shrine built to their honor in Brielle.
