= Andrew Wouters =

Dutch Catholic priest, saint, and martyr

Saint Andrew Wouters
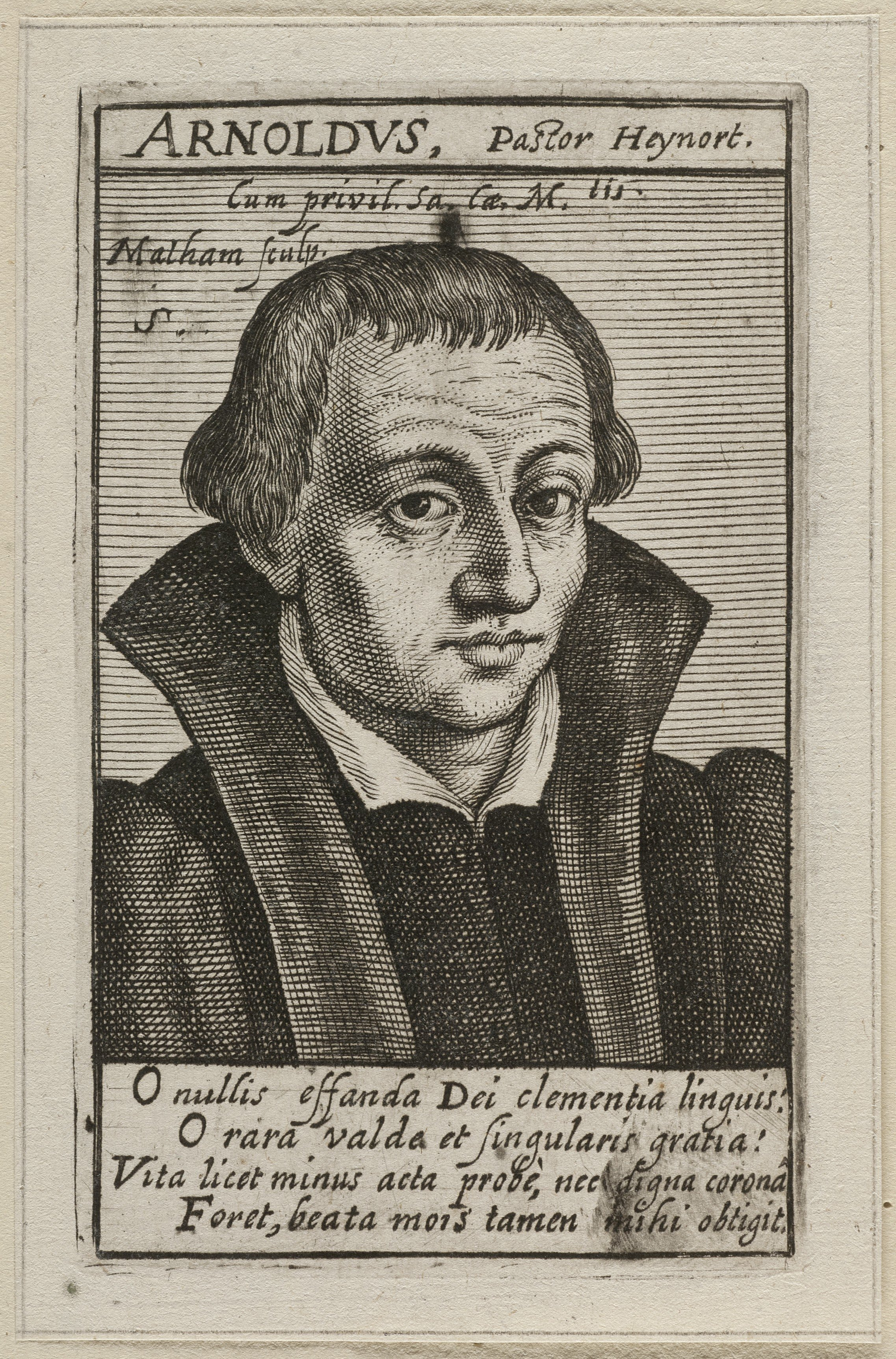

Martyr
- Born: 1542
- Died: 9 July 1572 (aged 29-30); Brielle, Spanish Netherlands
- Venerated in: Catholic Church
- Beatified: 14 November 1675, Rome by Pope Clement X
- Canonized: 29 June 1867, Rome by Pope Pius IX
- Feast: 9 July

Andrew Wouters (Dutch: Andries Wouters) was a Dutch Catholic priest who served as pastor in Heinenoord, Hoeksche Waard. He was among the 19 Martyrs of Gorkum in 1572.

Wouters and his fellow martyrs were canonized by Pope Pius IX on June 29, 1867, after being beatified by Pope Clement X in 1675. Wouters' feast day is 9 July.

== Life ==
Wouters was born in 1542. He was ordained a priest and lived a very scandalous life. He was a known womanizer, and was known to have had several children.

During the Dutch revolt against the Spanish, a Calvinist rebel group set themselves up to battle the Catholic Church in the Netherlands. In June 1572, Gorkum fell to the Dutch, and the mentioned rebels captured nine Franciscan friars, two lay brothers, and also a parish priest with his assistant. They joined two other imprisoned clerics. Four more, including Wouters, were added to the fifteen already captured in mid-June.

Imprisoned at Gorkum from 26 June to 6 July 1572, the nineteen were moved to Brielle, arriving on 8 July. The captured were ordered to abandon their belief in Transubstantiation, and also their belief in Papal supremacy. All refused to renounce the faith. A letter from William the Silent, saying that all those in authority should leave the priests and brothers unmolested, was ignored by the Calvinists. The martyrs were hanged in 1572 from the roof of a turfshed.

Wouters' last words were "Fornicator I always was; heretic I never was", a reference to his past as a known womanizer and his refusal to renounce the Catholic faith.

== Veneration ==
Wouters and his 18 fellow martyrs were beatified just over a century after their deaths, after many miraculous things were attributed to their intercession, including the curing of hernias in particular. Their canonizations were on the Feast of Saints Peter and Paul in 1867, as a part of the grand celebrations for the 1800th anniversary of the two apostles' martyrdoms.

Brielle, the place of the martyrdom, was a site of many pilgrimages and processions before the martyrs' relics were transferred to the Church of Saint Nicholas in Brussels, Belgium.
