= Nicholas Pieck =

16th-century Dutch Friar Minor and martyr declared a saint by the Catholic Church

Saint Nicholas Pieck O.F.M.
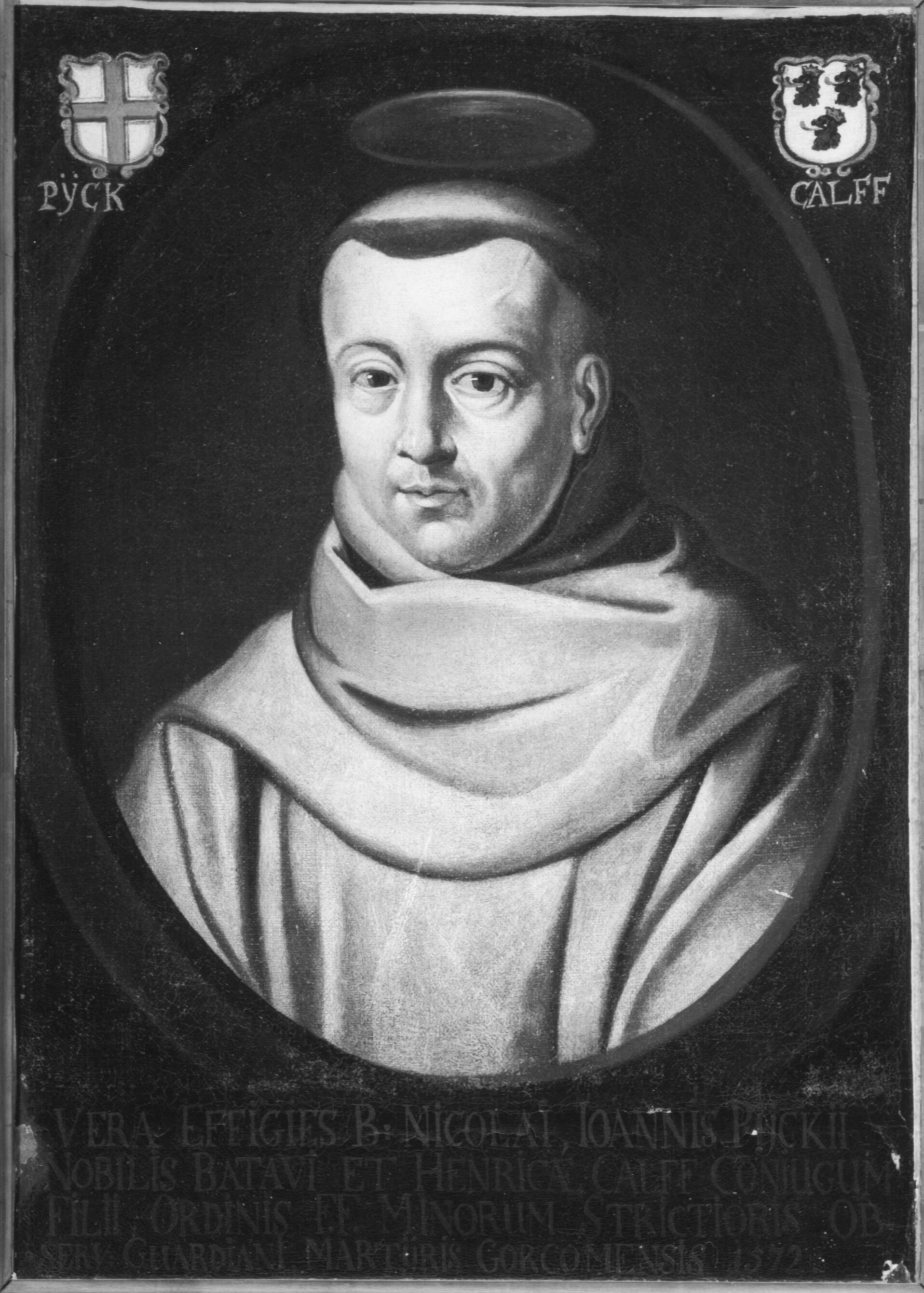

Religious, priest and martyr
- Born: 29 August 1534; Gorkum, County of Holland, Holy Roman Empire
- Died: 9 July 1572 (aged 37); Brielle, County of Holland
- Venerated in: Roman Catholic Church (Order of Friars Minor)
- Beatified: 24 November 1675, Rome, Papal States by Pope Clement X
- Canonized: 29 June 1867, Rome, Papal States by Pope Pius IX
- Major shrine: Brielle, South Holland, Netherlands
- Feast: 9 July
- Attributes: Franciscan habit

Nicholas Pieck, O.F.M., "Nicolaas" or "Claes Pieck" in Dutch, was a Franciscan friar who was one of a group of Catholic clergy and lay brothers, the Martyrs of Gorkum, who were executed for refusal to renounce their faith in 1572.

== Life ==
He was born in the town of Gorkum (now Gorinchem), the son of Jan Pieck and Henriea Clavia, devout Catholics. He was sent to college at 's-Hertogenbosch, and as soon as he had completed his classical studies he received the habit of the Friars Minor at the friary in that town. Nicholas was ordained a priest in 1558, devoting himself to the apostolic ministry. He was appointed Guardian of the friary in Gorkum, his native town.

Pieck preached against Calvinism. In particular, he preached the dogma of the Real Presence. In June 1572, the citadel of Gorkum was taken by the Watergeuzen, who retained 19 of the clergy as prisoners although they had promised to let the inhabitants depart from the town without being molested. For reprisals, because of the city's determined defense, they gathered all the members of the clergy in Gorkum into one prison and took out their grievances against the Spanish crown on the priests and religious.

Pieck and eight other Franciscan friars were confined in a dark and foul dungeon where they were tortured. Taking the cord which Pieck wore around his waist and putting it around his neck, they first suspended him from a beam and then let him fall heavily to the ground. This torture was continued until the cord broke, and Father Nicholas fell to the ground unconscious. Pieck's two brothers tried to obtain his release, but the guardian would not leave the others. Other priests were captured, bringing the total to 19.

On 6 July they were thrown half-naked into the hold of a ship and removed to Brielle. Stopping at Dordrecht they were exhibited for money to the curious. At Brielle the commander of the Watergeuzen, William II de la Marck, promised them freedom if they would renounce the authority of the pope and belief in the Real Presence. None did. Despite instructions from Prince William the Silent to spare them, and protests from the magistrates of Gorkum, the members of the group were hanged on 9 July 1572 in an old barn at the deserted Ruggen Monastery on the outskirts of Briel. The execution was clumsily handled; it took two hours for some of them to strangle. They became known as the Martyrs of Gorkum.

== Veneration ==
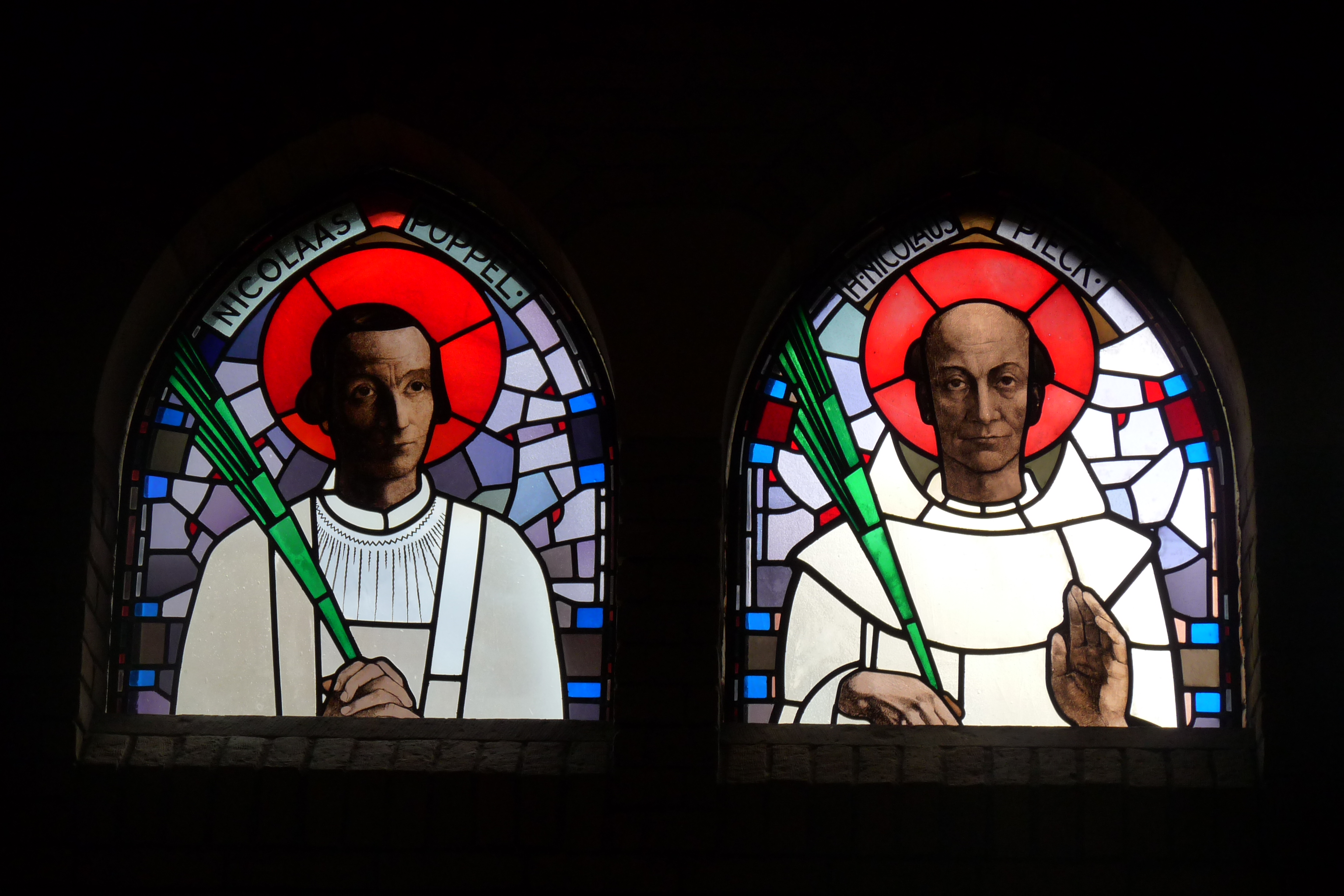
Stained glass windows at the Hofkerk (Amsterdam) with Nicolaas Poppel and Nicholas Pieck (right)

Nicholas and his companions were beatified by Clement X, 24 November 1675, and canonized by Pius IX, 29 June 1867. For many years the place of their martyrdom in Brielle has been the scene of numerous pilgrimages and processions.
