= Adrian Jansen =

Dutch Norbertine priest and Roman Catholic saint

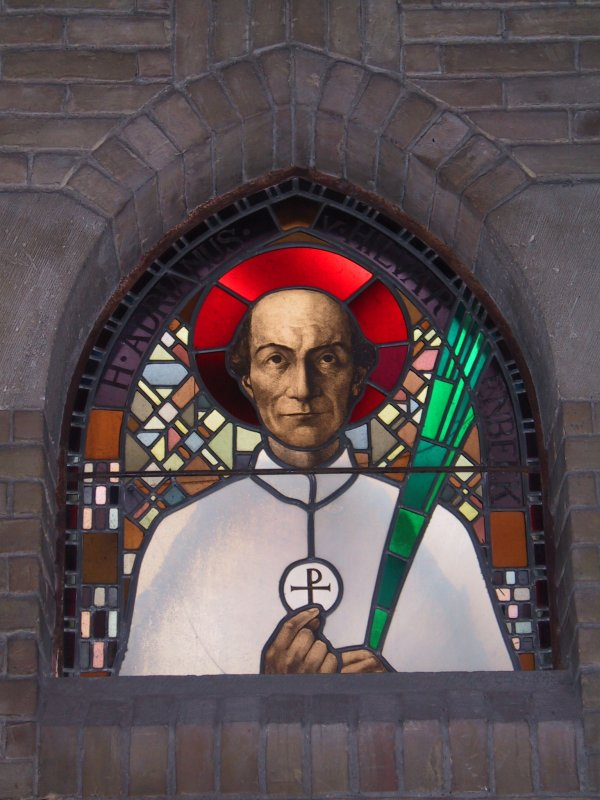

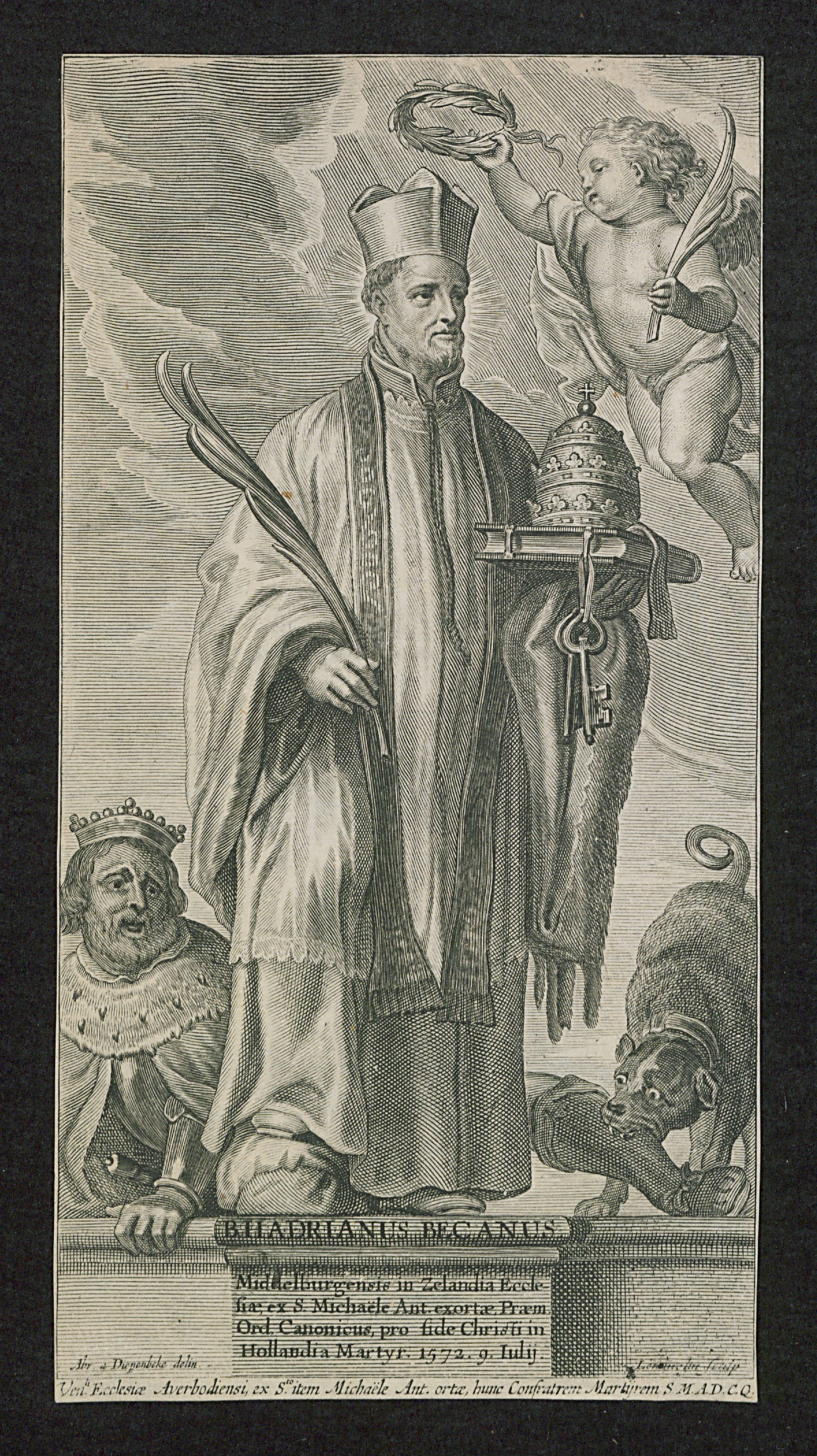

Adrian Jansen (*ca. 1528, Hilvarenbeek; † 9 July 1572, Brielle), also known as "Becanus", was one of the Martyrs of Gorkum, a Norbertine priest and a Roman Catholic saint.

== Biography ==
Little is known about Jansens' life. He entered the order at Middelburg Abbey. In 1560, was made parish priest in Aagtekerke, in 1572 he was transferred to Monster.

As he refused to revoke his Catholic faith, he was murdered by Calvinists in 1572.

== Veneration ==
Pope Clemens X. beatified him in 1675 and Pius IX. canonized him in 1867 as one of the 18 Martyrs of Gorkum. He is venerated to this day, especially within the Premonstratansian Order.
