= Johan Zierneels =

Dutch painter

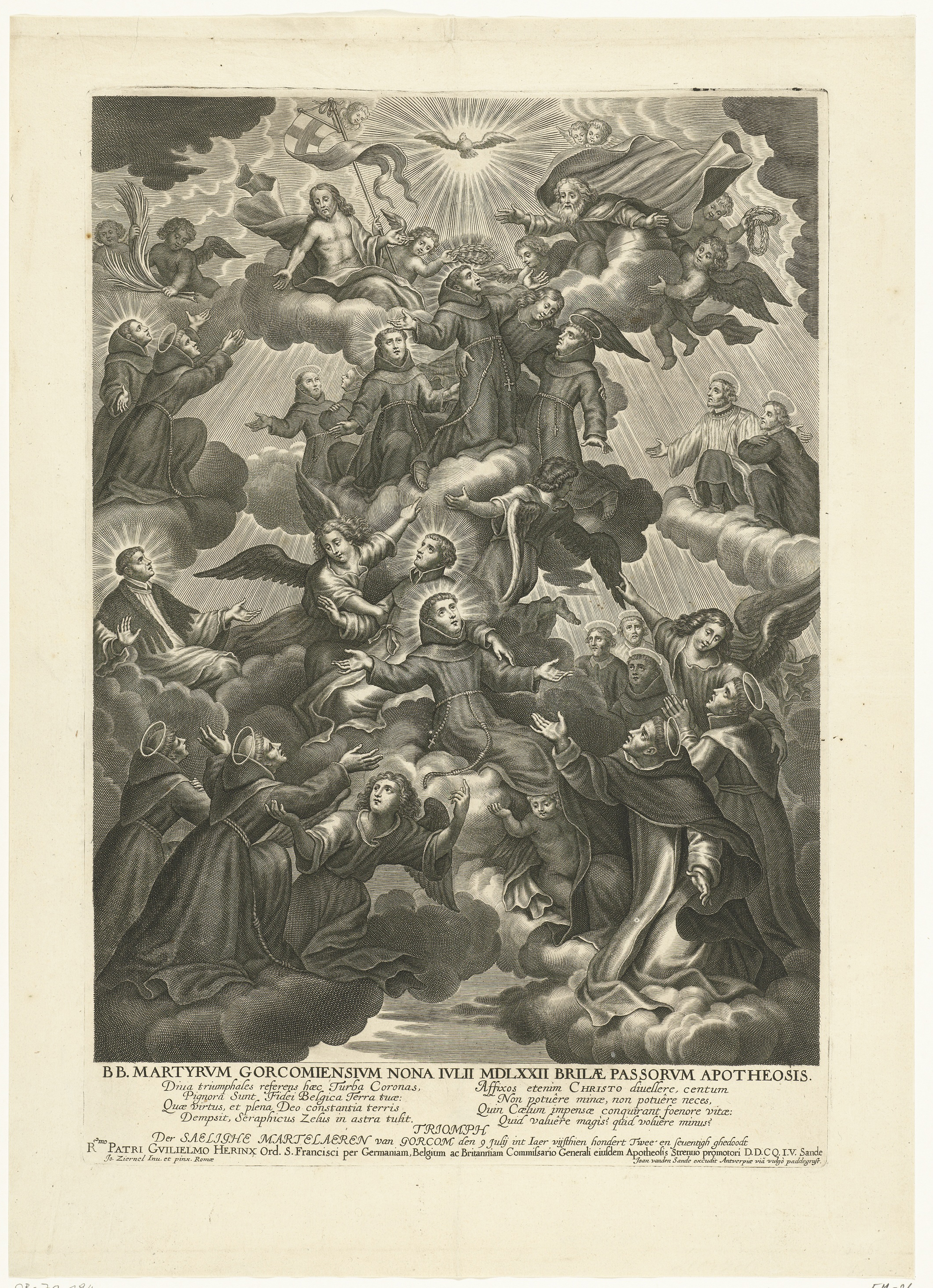
Apotheosis of the Martyrs of Gorkum 1572, print made by Jean-Baptiste Nolin after a painting by Johan Zierneels, 1675

Johan Zierneels (alternative spellings: Jan Zierneels, Johannes Zierneels, Syrnel, Záernel, Ziereels, Ziereneels, Zierneel, Jan Zioerneels, Ziernel, Zionnels, alias Lely or Lelie) (Meierij van 's-Hertogenbosch; c.1646 – after 1678) was a Dutch painter who specialized in Christian religious themes.

== Biography ==
According to the Dutch Golden Age biographer Arnold Houbraken, Zierneels was born in the Meierij van 's-Hertogenbosch. Nothing is known about his training. He traveled to Rome in 1671 where he is documented until 1678. There is no further information about him after this date. In 1674-1675 he joined the Bentvueghels, an association of mainly Dutch and Flemish artists working in Rome, where he took the nickname (referred to as ‘'bent name'’) 'Lely' or 'Lelie' (which are two different ways in which the word meaning 'lily' could at the time be spelled in Dutch). The evidence for his membership is provided by a guest list made on the occasion of the induction of three new members: Abraham Genoels, François Moens and Pieter Verbrugghen II.

It is believed that Johan Zierneels died in Rome.

== Work ==
No signed works by his hand have been preserved. He painted a comprehensive series on the Martyrs of Gorcum, whose beatification in 1675 was celebrated with grand festivities. One of these works is in the Pinacoteca Comunale in Terni.
