= Coart family =

Belgian noble family

- Blazon: Quarterly, first and fourth ermine, a book closed gules leaved and clasped or, second and third vert, a gauntlet argent fesswise.
- Current region: Belgium
- Origin: Prince-Bishopric of Liège
- Founded: 17th century
- Distinctions: Commander of the Order of Leopold; Grand Officer of the Order of the Crown; Grand Officer of the Order of Leopold II; Grand Officer of the Order of the Oak Crown; Croix de guerre; Fire Cross; Political Prisoner's Cross; Médaille militaire; Croix de guerre 1914–1918 (France)
- Motto: Firmant virtus et labor (Asserting yourself with courage and hard work)

The Coart family is a Belgian noble family from the Prince-Bishopric of Liège whose proven ancestry dates to 1661.

== Notable members ==
- Justin Coart, alderman of Tongres from 1861 to 1878, member of the Provincial Council of Limburg, and Knight of the Order of Leopold.
- Arsène-Henri-Justin Coart (1829–1915), President Emeritus of the Tongres Court and an Officer of the Order of Leopold.
  - Emile-Jean-Mathias-Lambert Coart (1860–1943), Knight of the Order of Leopold, magistrate, lawyer and the President of the Tongres Bar.
    - Paul J. Coart (1892–1979), écuyer, doctor of Law, Grand Officer of the Order of the Crown and of the Order of Leopold II, Commander of the Order of Leopold.

== Authority ==
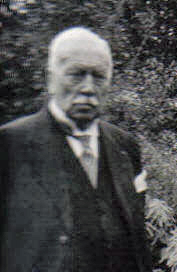
Emile Coart (1860–1943), Knight of the Order of Leopold, father of Paul J. Coart

Content in this edit is translated from the existing French Wikipedia article at fr:Famille Coart; see its history for attribution.

== Allied families ==
- de Muyser Lantwyck family

== See also ==
- Godfried Coart
- List of noble families in Belgium
