= Jakob Lacoupe =

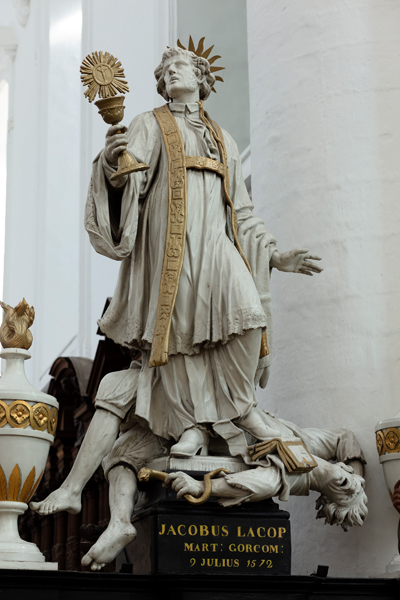
Jacobus Lacop in the Abbey Church in Ninove

Jakob Lacoupe (*ca. 1542, Oudenaarde; +09. July 1572, Gorinchem), also known in English as James Lacoupe, was a Norbertine priest who died as a martyr as one of the Martyrs of Gorkum and a Roman-Catholic Saint.

== Biography ==
We don't know a lot about his early life. At Middelburg Abbey, he entered the Premonstransian Order. In 1566, he joined the Protestants and became a protestant priest. In that time, he also wrote Anti-Catholic literature.

Some time later, his father and brother could convince him to rejoin the order and the Catholic Church. The abbot at the time, Nikolaus van den Burcht, punished him with five years of penance at the Marienweerd Abbey. Finally, he was named assistant parish priest at Monster in 1572.

In the same year, protestants raided the parish grounds and brought him and the parish priest, Adrian Jansen, to Gorinchem. They were held at Gorinchem from 26 June to 06 July 1572.

After another three days of torture in Dordrecht and Brielle, he was killed by hanging on 09 July 1572.

== Veneration ==
Pope Clemens X. beatified him in 1675 and Pius IX. canonized him in 1867 as one of the 18 Martyrs of Gorkum. He is venerated to this day, especially within the Premonstratansian Order.

Blessed Jakob Kern was named (religious name) after Jakob Lacoupe.
