= Vaalbeek =

Coordinates: 50°49′N 04°41′E

Vaalbeek is part of Oud-Heverlee in Flemish Brabant, Belgium. The municipality further comprises the villages of Blanden, Haasrode, Oud-Heverlee proper and Sint-Joris-Weert. On 1 January 2006, Vaalbeek had a total population of 363.

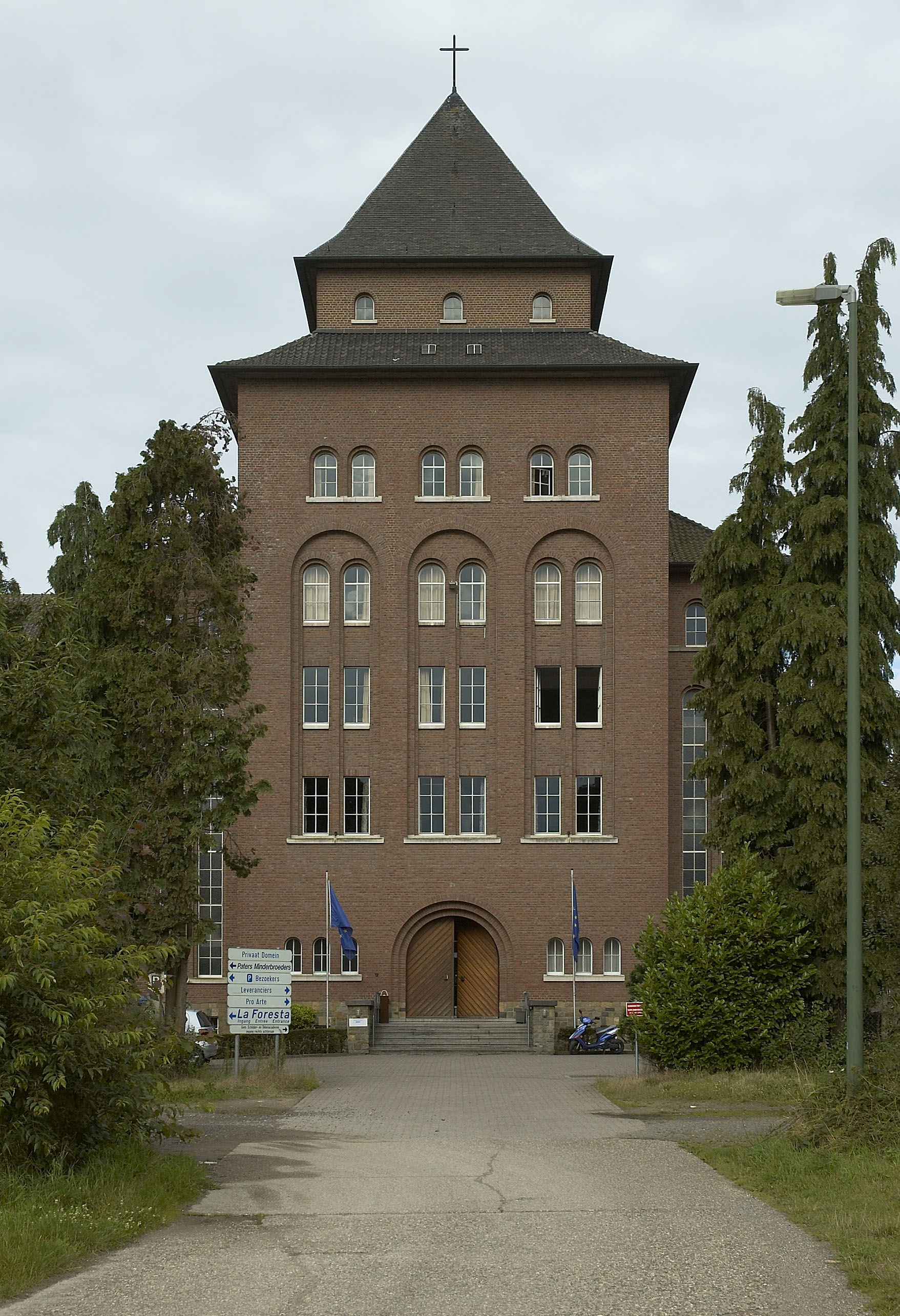
