= Stieltjeskerk =

Former church in Rotterdam, Netherlands

Coordinates: 51°54′42.3″N 4°29′59.43″E

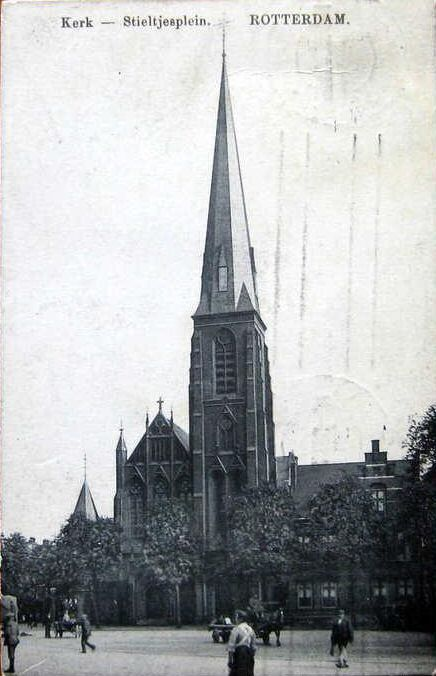
Stieltjeskerk (1910)

The Martyrs of Gorcum Church, also known as the Stieltjeskerk, was a Roman Catholic church in Rotterdam.

Rotterdam and its harbor underwent tremendous growth in the second half of the 19th century. The district of Feijenoord was originally built on the south bank of the Meuse (Maas). A significant part of the new inhabitants were Catholics from the provinces of North Brabant and Zeeland. Ahead of them between 1875 and 1876 on Roentgenstraat a wooden church was built by the pastor Ludovicus Gompertz.

Between 1885 and 1886 on Stieltjes Square a stone church was built. The architect John Kayser designed a three-aisled cruciform church in neo-Gothic style, with a tower on the front. The church was dedicated to the martyrs of Gorcum. On July 12, 1886, the church was consecrated.

After World War II, the number of parishioners fell sharply. The Martyrs of Gorcum Church was finally merged into the Holy Trinity parish. The Stieltjeskerk was closed and demolished in 1976. In this place is now a retirement home. The two doors of the entrance and several stained-glass windows are preserved at the Museum Rotterdam.
