= Martyrs of Gorkum =

19 Dutch Catholic clerics executed in Brielle, present-day Netherlands (1572)

The Martyrs of Gorkum
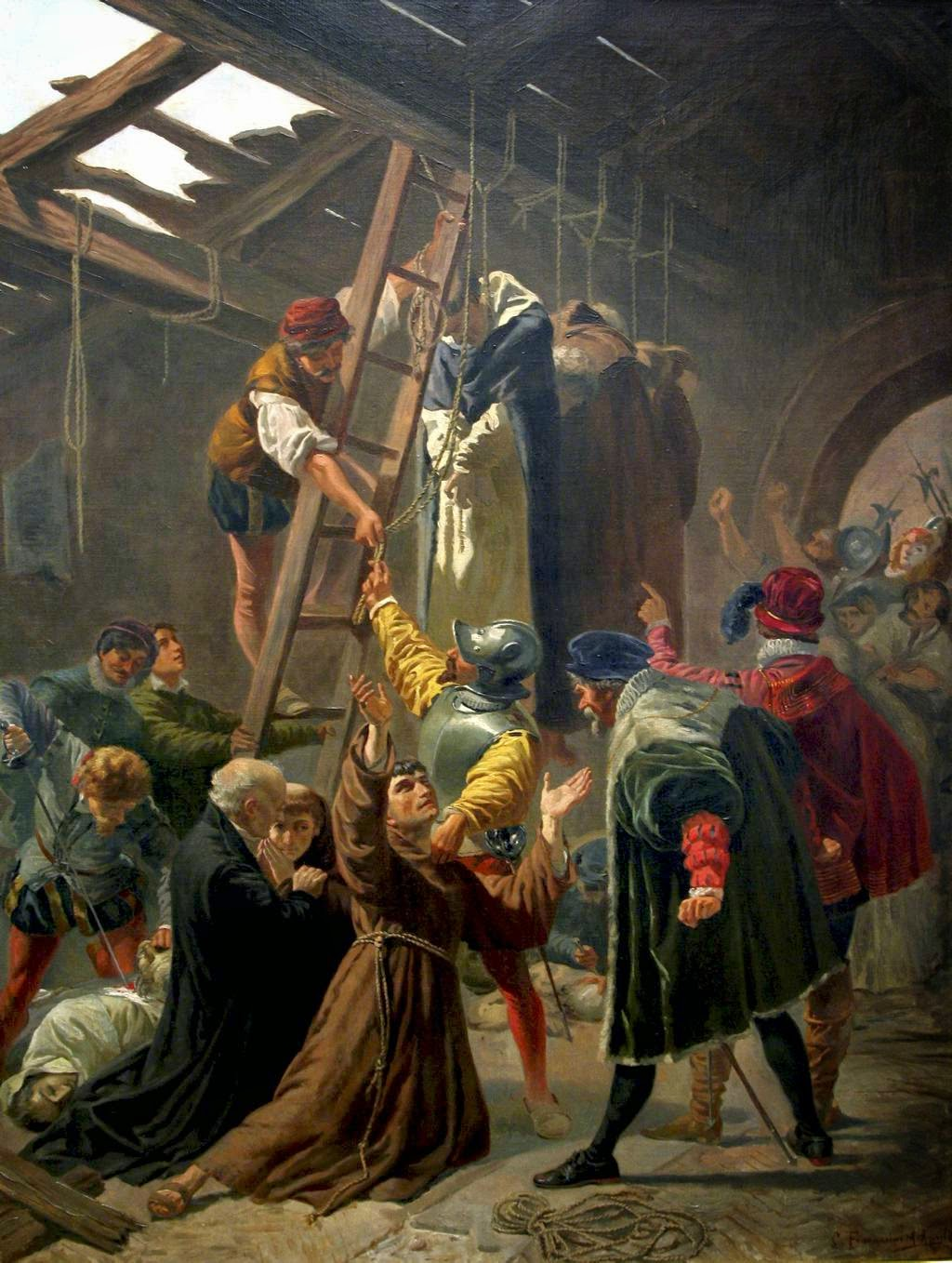
- Born: 16th century
- Died: 9 July 1572, Brielle, County of Holland, Spanish Netherlands
- Martyred by: The Watergeuzen
- Means of martyrdom: Hanging
- Venerated in: Catholic Church (Netherlands and the Order of Friars Minor)
- Beatified: 14 November 1675, Rome, Papal States, by Pope Clement X
- Canonized: 29 June 1867, Rome, Papal States, by Pope Pius IX
- Major shrine: Church of St. Nicholas, Brussels, Belgium
- Feast: 9 July
- Notable martyrs: Nicholass Pieck; Jeroen van Weert; Dirk van der Eem;Nicasius of Heeze; Willehad of Denmark; Govaert van Mervel; Andrus van Weert; Antonius van Hoornaar; Francis de Roye; Govaert van Duynsen; Joannes van Hoornaer, Jacobus Lacops; Adriaan van Hilvarenbeek; Andreaas Wouters and Joannes van Hoornaer

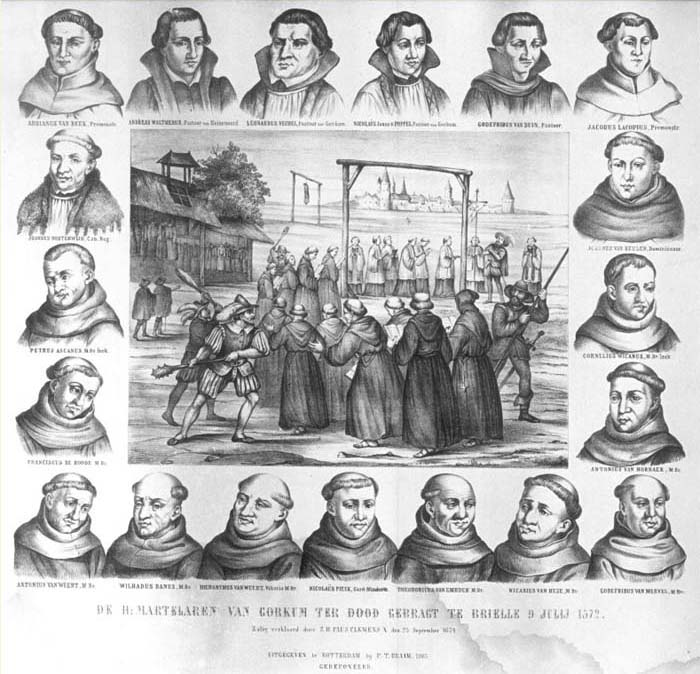
Martyrs of GorKum

The Martyrs of Gorkum (Dutch: Martelaren van Gorcum) were a group of 19 Catholic clerics, secular and religious, in the Netherlands. They were hanged on 9 July 1572 in the town of Brielle by militant Calvinists during the Dutch Revolt against Spanish rule.

Given the chance to save their lives by renouncing Catholic teachings, the 19 men refused. The martyrs were beatified in 1675 and canonized in 1867. Today the martyrs are widely revered by Catholics in the Netherlands.

== Events ==
=== Background ===
During the middle of the 16th century, the present-day Netherlands were part of the Spanish Netherlands, a group of small kingdoms and towns ruled by the Catholic king of Spain, Philip II. Since the Protestant Reformation of 1521, the nobility in the region had converted from Catholicism to Calvinism. Over the succeeding decades, the Calvinist Dutch nobility had become increasing restive under Philip's rule, due to his heavy taxation and his persecution of Protestants.

During the late 1600's, the Catholic rulers of Gorkum (also called Gorinchem) would not allow a Calvinist church in the city. As a result, the Calvinist followers were forced to listen to sermons outside the city walls. Soon Calvinist activists started attacking Catholic churches. In 1566, the city allow the Calvinists to use a wooden shed, called the Geuzen House, outside the walls for their services.

=== Dutch Revolt ===
By 1568, the Dutch Revolt had begun. Philip responded to the rebellion by sending his top commander, the Duke of Alba, to the region. Alba conducted brutal massacres of civilians in Dutch towns, hanged Protestant nobles, and battled with Calvinist forces. Many of the Calvinists took out their anger on Catholic clergy, whom they viewed as Spanish allies.

In 1569, the Protestant noble William of Orange authorized a privateer fleet of 25 vessals known as the Watergeuzen (Sea Beggars), commanded by the Belgian William de la Marck, Lord of Lumey. The Watergeuzen were allowed to capture Spanish ships and raid Spanish-occupied towns in the Netherlands. Most of the crews were Protestant Dutch who had been forced into exile by the Spanish. Elizabeth I, a rival of Spain, allow the Watergeuzen to base themselves in England.However, in March 1572, she expelled them from England to placate Philip. When de la Marck in April 1572 found the port of Brielle in the Netherlands to be undefended, his fleet occupied it and made it their new base.

The Watergeuzen in June 1572 arrived at Gorkum. The defenders of the city opened the city gates after de la Marck promised not to pillage the city. However, the mayor refused to surrender the castle in Gorkum. The Catholic clergy took refuge there as well. The Watergeuzen burned the castle, forcing its occupants to surrender.The raiders then looted all the Catholic churches in Gorkum.

=== Franciscan prisoners ===
The Watergeuzen arrested the nine priests and two lay brothers from the Franciscan friary in Gorkum. They included:

- Nicholas Pieck, the guardian of the friary. A native of Gorkum, he had delivered many speeches in the town criticizing Calvinism.
- Andrus van Weert, the vicar of the friary, was a former missionary to Palestine who also preached against Calvinism.
- Dirk van der Eem served as chaplain to a community of Franciscan Tertiary Sisters in Gorkum.
- Nicasius of Heeze, another priest, was also the Baron de Heeze in North Brabant.
- Willehad was a 90-year-old priest who had fled Denmark due to religious persecution by the Calvinists.
- Govaert van Mervel, a Belgian, was the sacristan and confessor at the priority; his hobby was painting.

=== Other prisoners ===
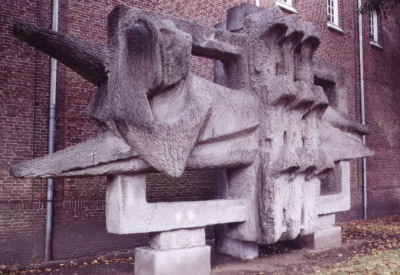
Martyrs of Gorkum by Bart Welten

Also imprisoned were:

- Leonardus Vechel, the parish priest in Gorkum He had previously studied at the Catholic University of Louvain.
- Godefried van Duynsen, a priest of Gorkum.
- Joannes Lenartz of Oisterwijk, a Canon Regular from a nearby friary and spiritual director for the monastery of Augustinian nuns in Gorkum.
- Adriaan van Hilvarenbeek, a Premonstratensian canon and a previous parish priest in Monster
- Andrew Wouters, a priest said to have fathered several children

When Joannes van Hoornaer, a Dominican parish priest in Honar, learned about the captures, he asked his superior for permission to travel to Gorkum in disguise to administer the sacraments to them. After the Watergeuzen discovered van Hoornaer's real identify, they imprisoned him also. Over the next two weeks, the imprisoned clerics were tortured.

=== Interrogation and trial ===
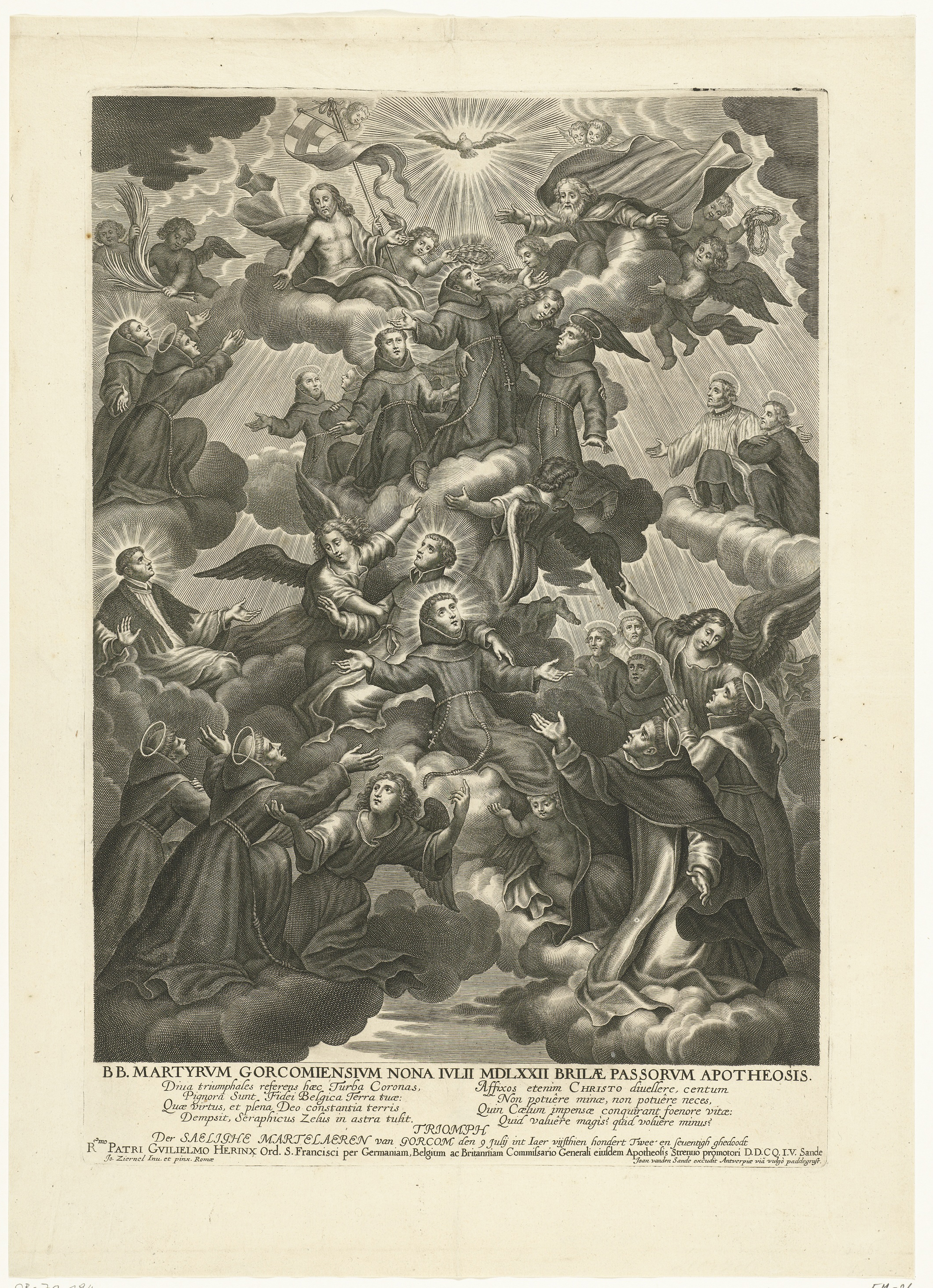
The Apotheosis of the Martyrs of Gorkum 1572, print by Jean-Baptiste Nolin after painting by Johan Zierneels, 1675

On 6 July 1572, the Watergeuzen left Gorkum by barge with their first 15 prisoners. When the barge docked in Dordrecht, the prisoners were stripped to their underwear. The Watergeuzen sold the robes and charged onlookers for the chance to view the undressed clerics. The group arrived in Brielle on 8 July.The total number of prisoners in Brielle eventually reached 23.

The prisoners were confined to a dungeon where they were humiliated and tortured. Pieck was repeatedly hung by the neck from a rafter by his Franciscan cord until it finally broke.The torturers were also hoping that the prisoners would reveal the location of hidden church treasures.

On 9 July, de la Marck convened a trial of the 23 men. They were quickly judged guilty and condemned to death. However, de la Marck and the Calvinist ministers offered the clerics a reprieve if they renounced the following Catholic teachings:

- Transubstantiation
- The real presence of Christ in the Blessed Sacrament
- Papal supremacy

Four of the clerics renounced these beliefs and saved their lives. The remaining 19 refused to do so. Wouters defiantly told his judges, “Fornicator I always was; heretic I never was.” After learning of the prisoners, William of Orange became concerned that their executions might generate outrage internationally. There are two versions of this story:

- In one version, William ordered de la Marck to release all the clerics without conditions, but de la Marck ignored the order.
- The version said that William order the clerics released if they just renounced papal supremacy, but the martyrs refused.

=== Execution ===
On 9 July, the same day as their trial, the 19 men were led to a turfshed on the grounds of the St. Elizabeth Monastery in the village of Rugge to be executed.Before his execution, Pieck made the following remark;

The hour is now at hand, to receive from the hand of the Lord the long desired reward of the struggle, the crown of eternal happiness.

While awaiting execution, the men reportedly recited Hail Marys and Pater Nosters (Lord's Prayer). Pieck asked God to forgive his executioners.All 19 men were hung with the nooses inserted in their mouths to ensure long painful deaths. Some of the clerics were mutilated while still alive. After cutting down the bodies, the Watergeuzen buried them in a nearby ditch.

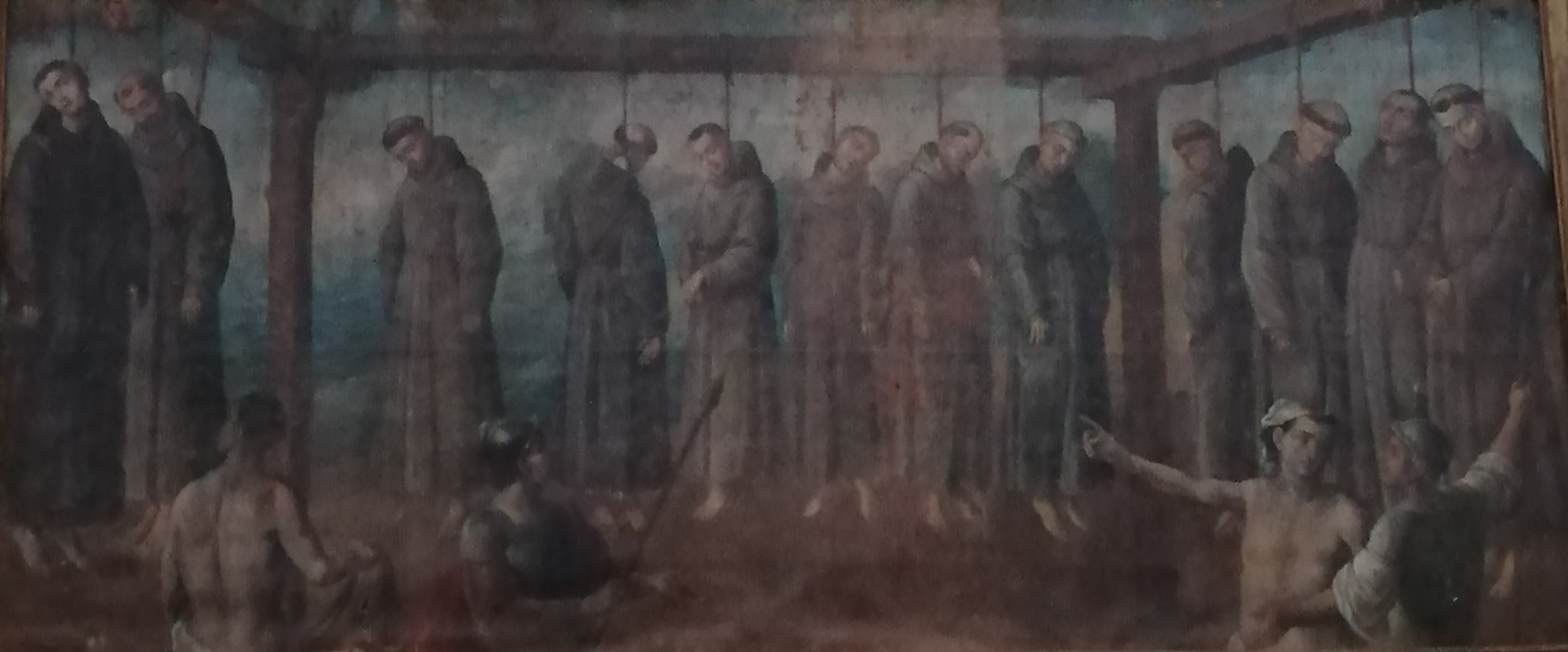
Matrires de Gorum, Church of San Francisco, Guatemala City, Guatemala

== Legacy ==
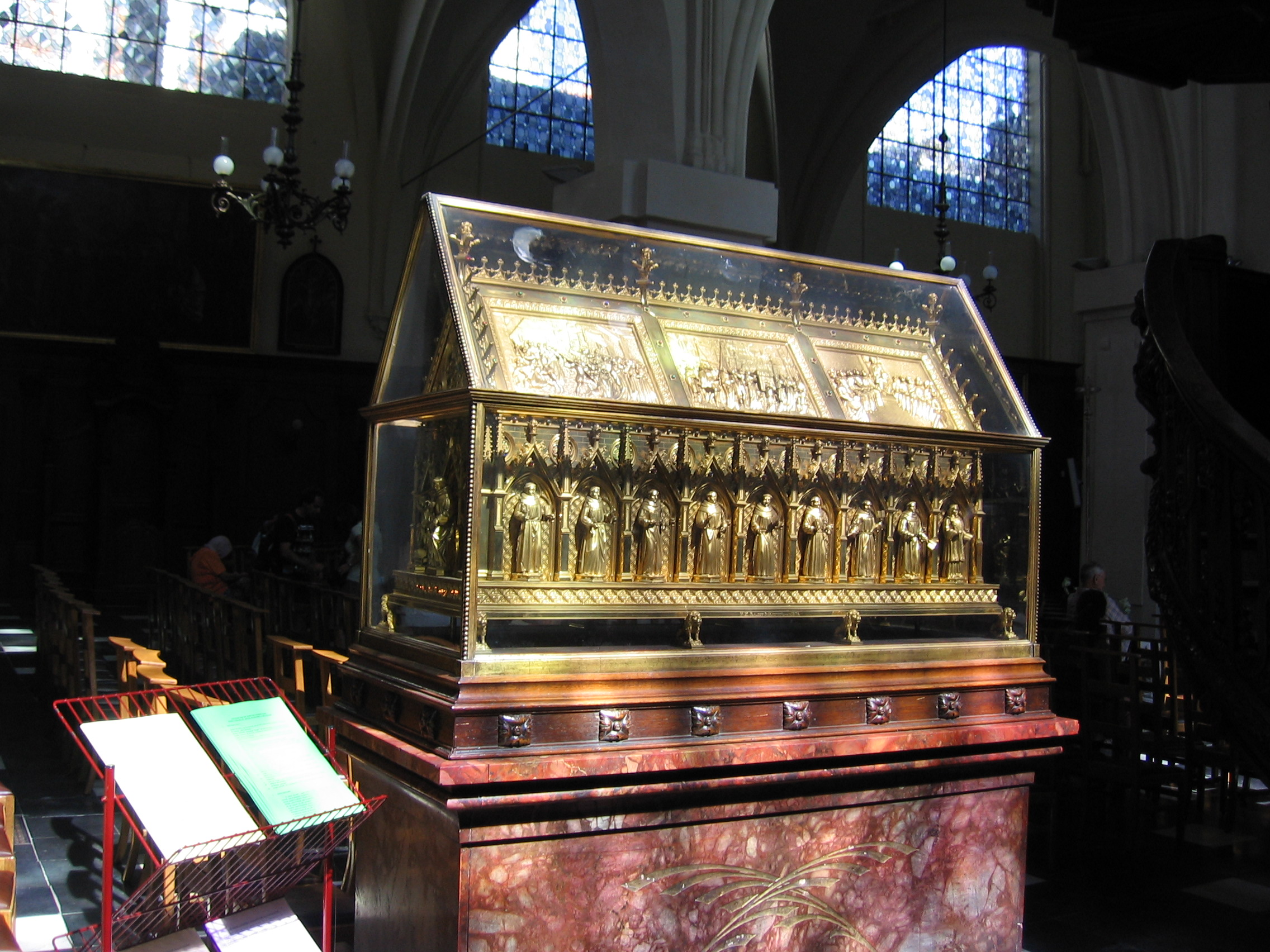
Reliquary of the Martyrs of Gorkum, Church of St. Nicholas Brussels.

In 1648, after decades of bloody warfare, Spain signed the Treaty of Münster, which led to the unification of the northern areas of the Netherlands into the Dutch Republic.Local authorities in Brielle allowed the Franciscans in 1616 to exume the martyr's bodies. The remains were brought to the Church of the Franciscans in Brussels to reside in a reliquary.

Legend had it that a shrub bearing 19 white flowers sprang up in the ditch where the martyrs had been buried. The Vatican started receiving reports of miracles due to the intercession of the Martyrs of Gorkum, especially in the curing of hernias.

Pope Clement X beatified the 19 martyrs on 14 November 1675. On 29 June 1867, Pope Pius IX cannonized them.During the canonization ceremony, Pius IX drew particular attention to the martyrs' loyalty to Catholic dogma.

A wooden church was constructed at the former burial site in Brielle in 1880. The wooden church was replaced in 1932 by the Pilgrimage Church of Rugge.The site soon became the focus of numerous pilgrimages and processions.The remains of the martyrs reside in a reliquary of the in the Church of St. Nicholas in Brussels and at the Pilgrimage Church of Rugge.

== Martyrs ==
The martyrs of Gorkum include:

=== Franciscan priests and lay brothers ===
- Antoon van Weert (born 1523), friar and priest
- Francis de Roye (born 1549), friar and priest
- Govaert van Mervel, vicar of Melveren, Sint-Truiden (born 1512), priest,
- Jeroen van Weert (born 1522), friar, priest, pastor in Gorcum
- Nicasius of Heeze (born 1522), friar, theologian and priest
- Petrus van Assche (born 1530), lay brother
- Nicholaas Pieck (born 1534), friar, priest and theologian, Guardian of the friary in Gorkum
- Antonius van Hoornaar, friar and priest
- Dirk van der Em (born c. 1499–1502), friar and priest,
- Cornelius van Wijk (born 1548), lay brother
- Willehad of Denmark (born 1482), friar and priest

=== Diocesan priests ===
- Nicolaas Janssen van Poppel (born 1532), chaplain in Gorkum
- Govaert van Duynen (born 1502), former pastor in northern France
- Leonardus van Veghel
- Andries Wouters (born 1542), pastor of Heinenoord in the Hoeksche Waard

=== Priests of other religious orders ===
- Johannes Lenaerts van Oisterwijk(born 1504), an Augustinian canon regular, a chaplain for the Beguinage in Gorkum
- Jan van Keulen, a Dominican friar, pastor in Hoornaar near Gorkum
- Jakob Lacobs (born 1541), a Norbertine canon and parish priest at Monster
- Adriaan van Hilvarenbeek (born 1528), a Norbertine canon and pastor in Monster, South Holland
Images of martyrs of Gorkum

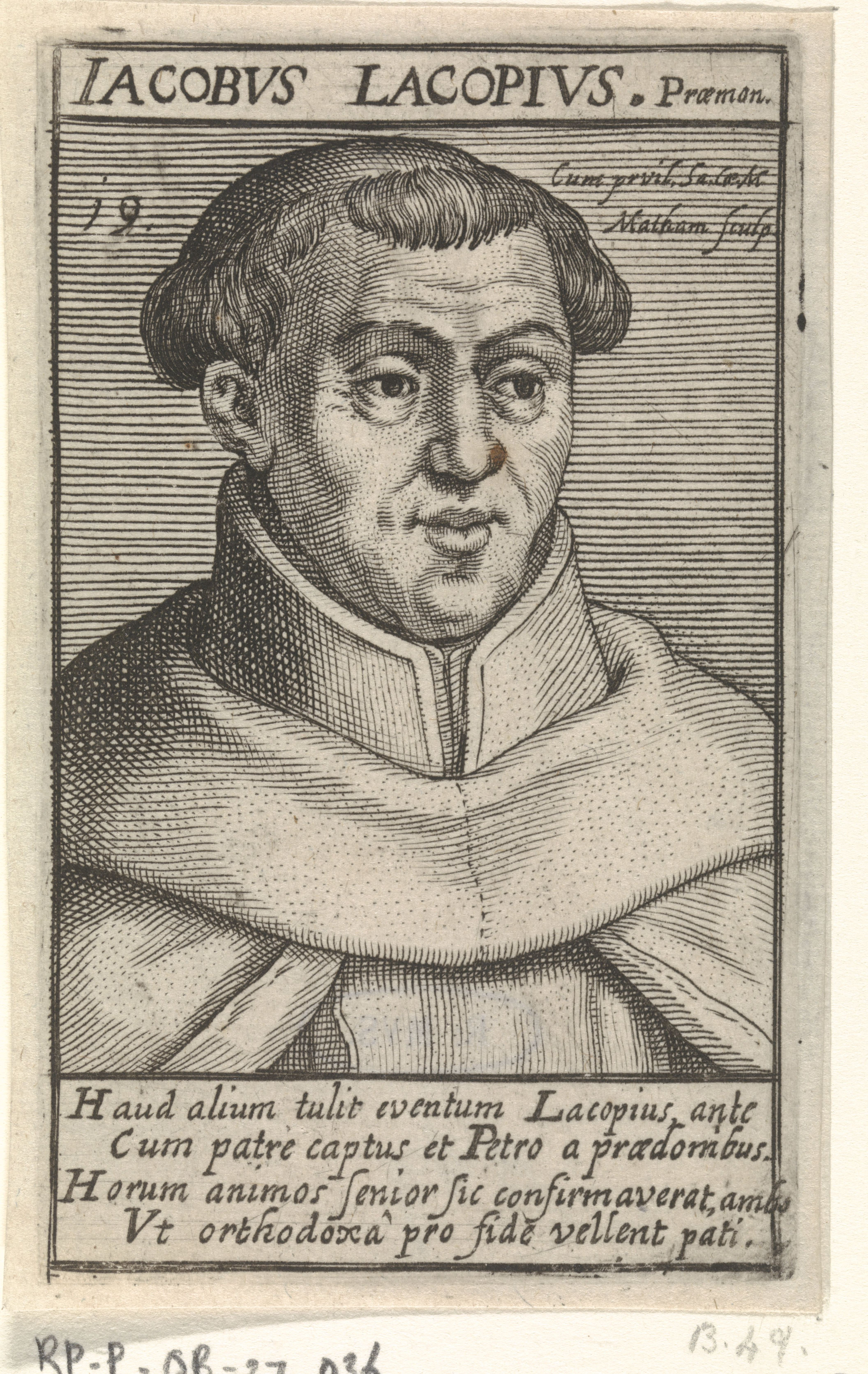
Jakob Lacobs

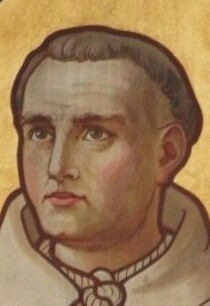
Johannes van Hoornaar

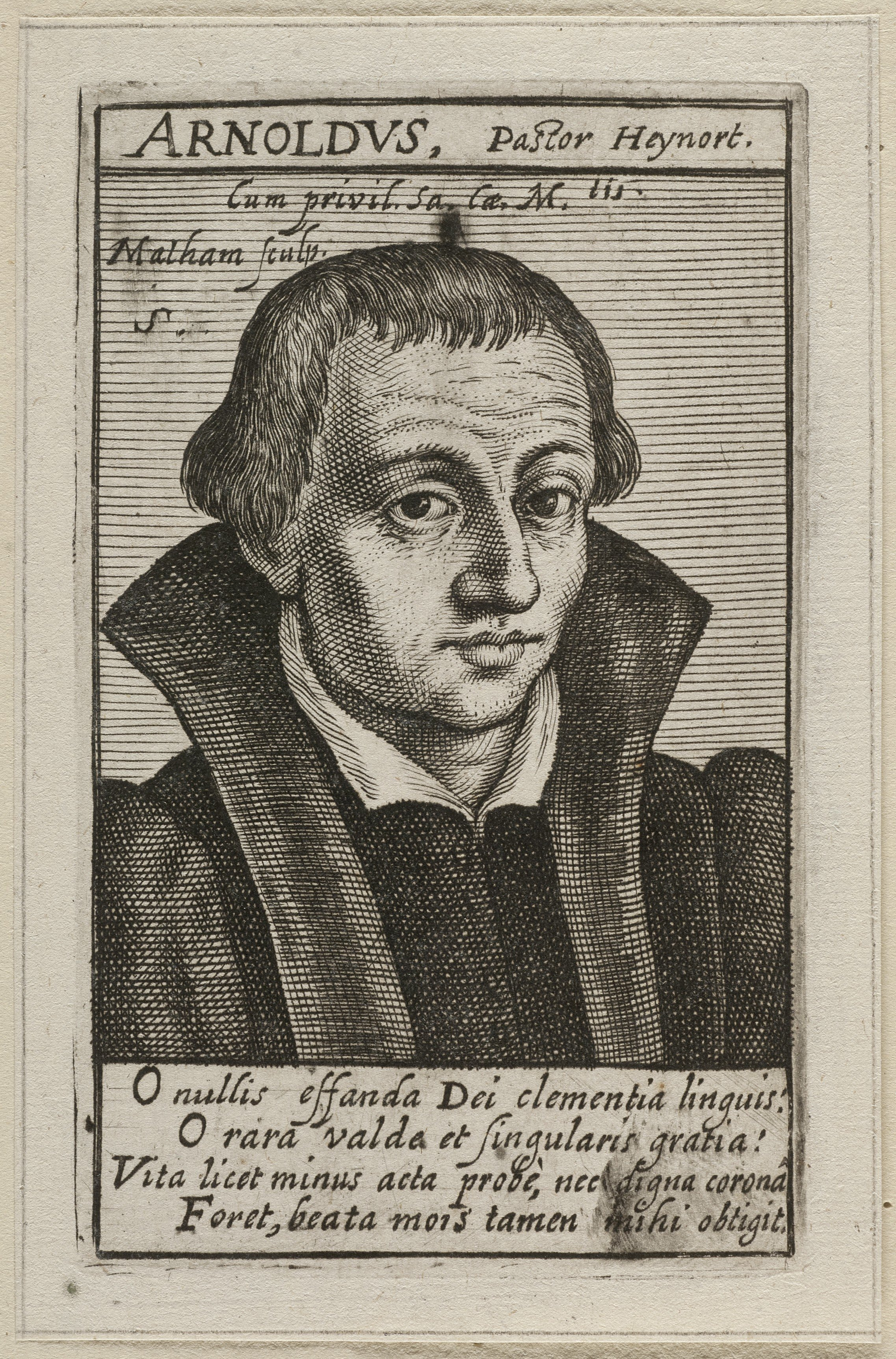
Andreas Wouters

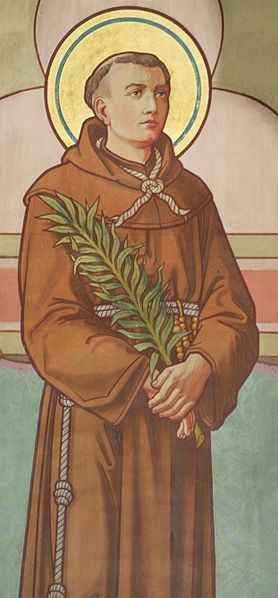
Govaert van Duynen

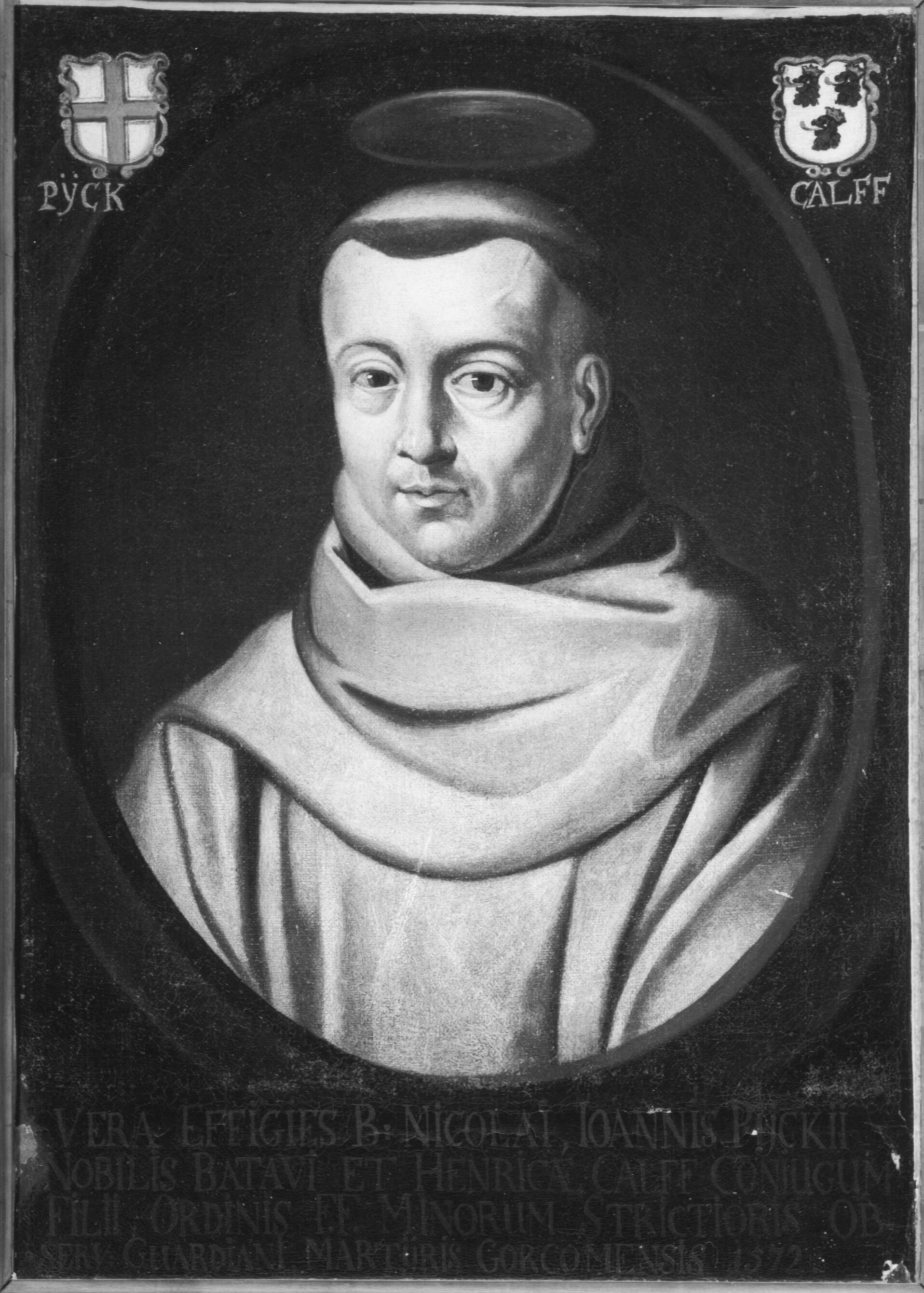
Nicolaas Pieck

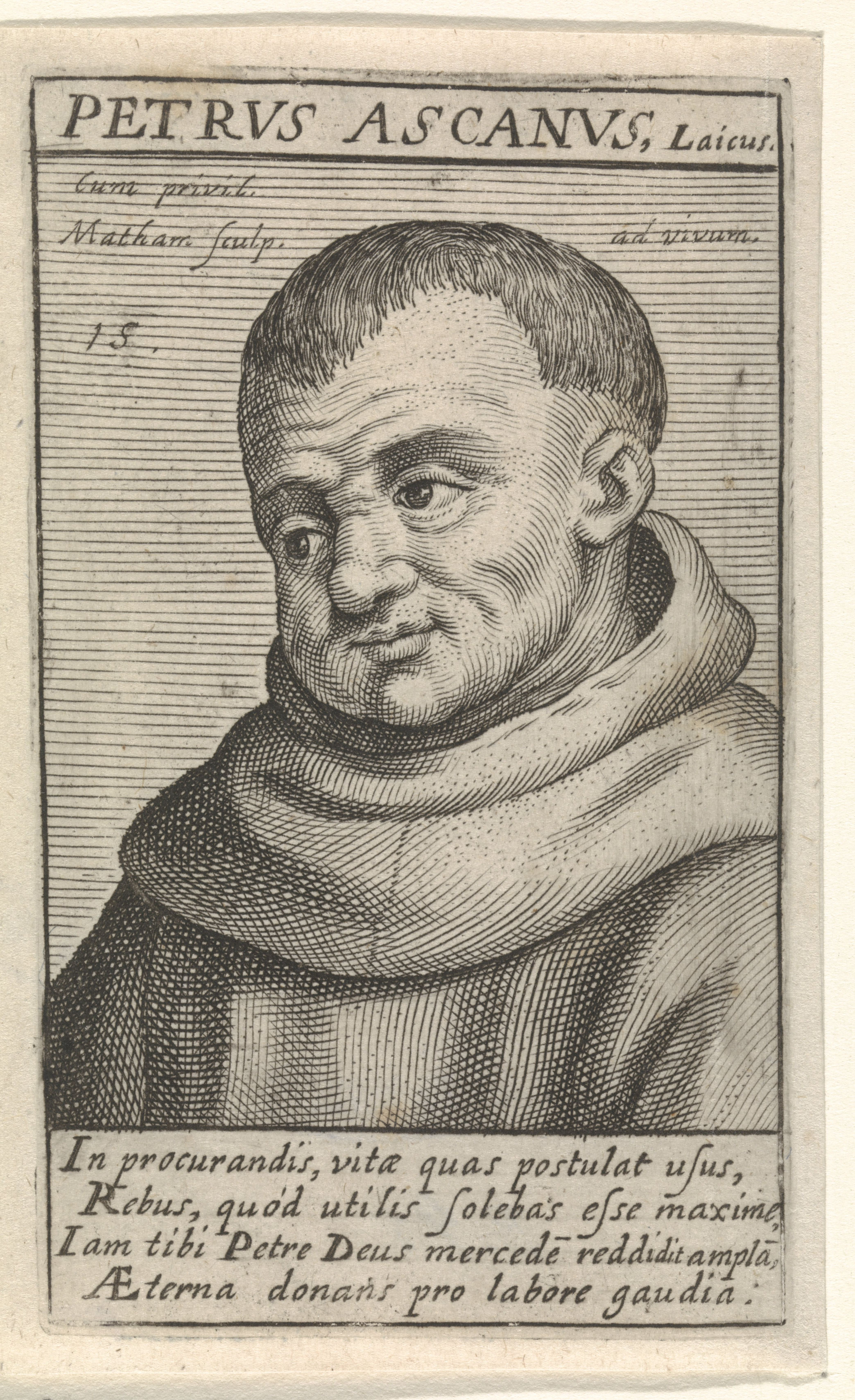
Petrus van Assche

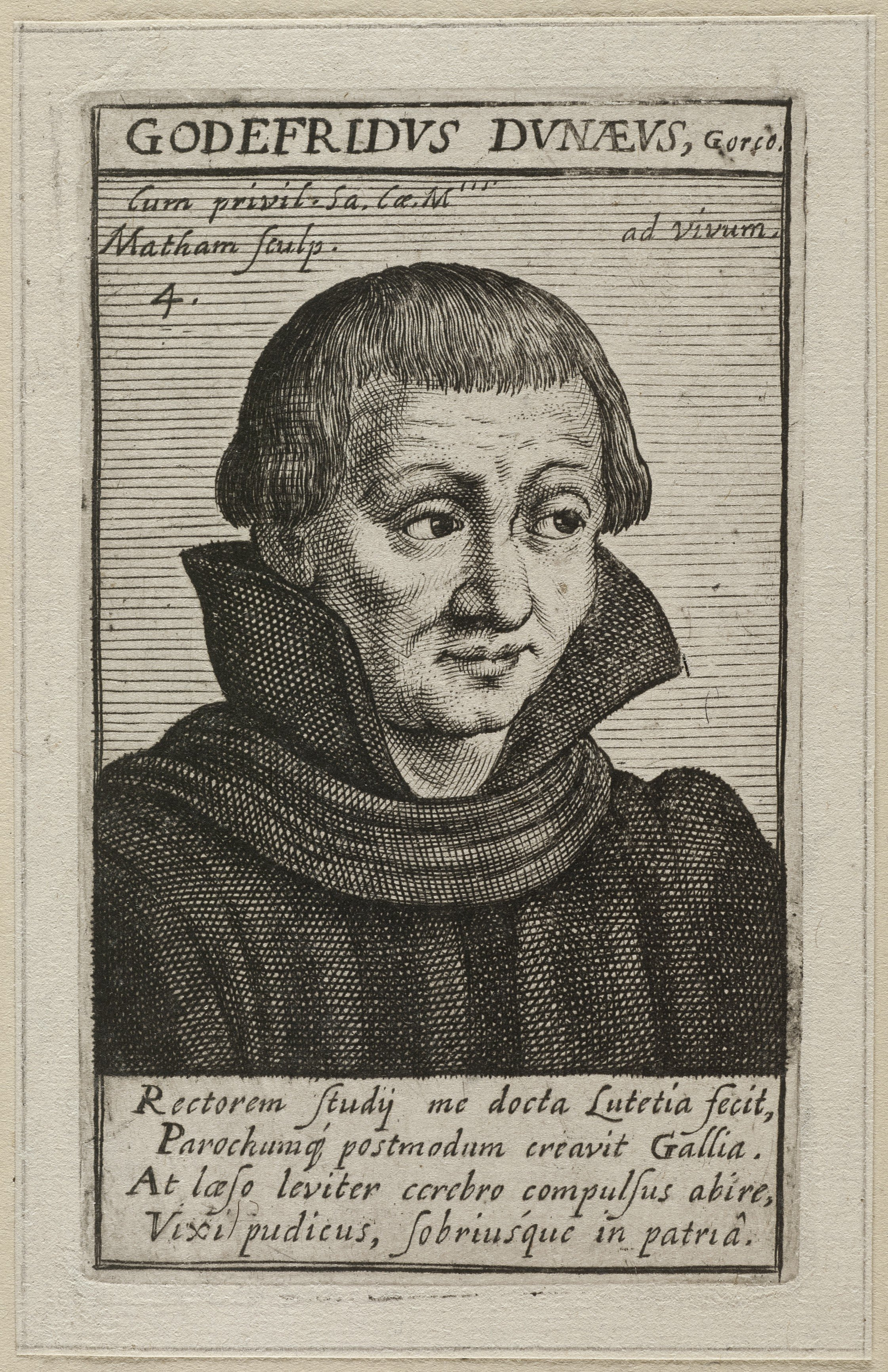
Govaert van Duynen

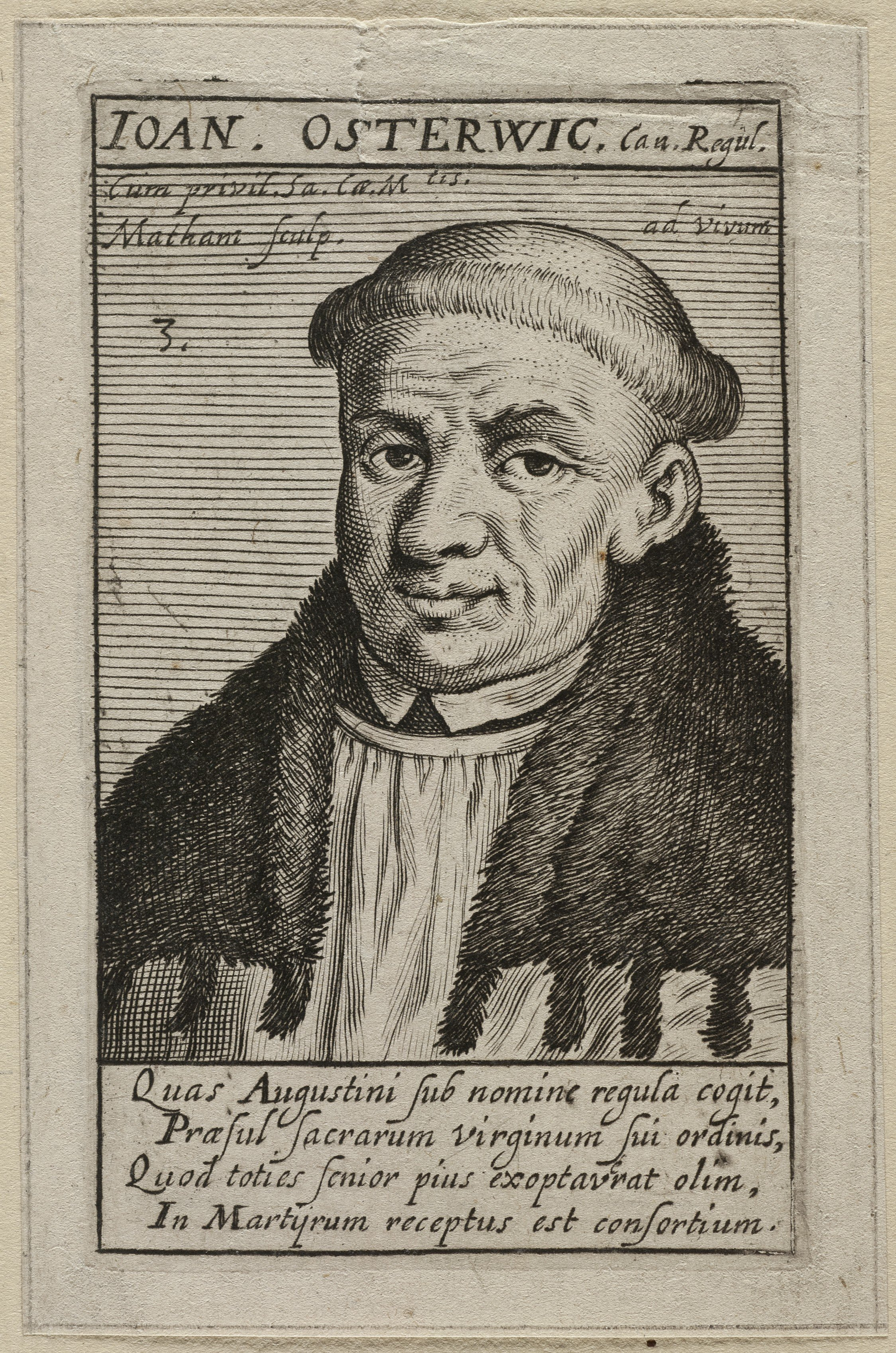
Joannes Lenartz

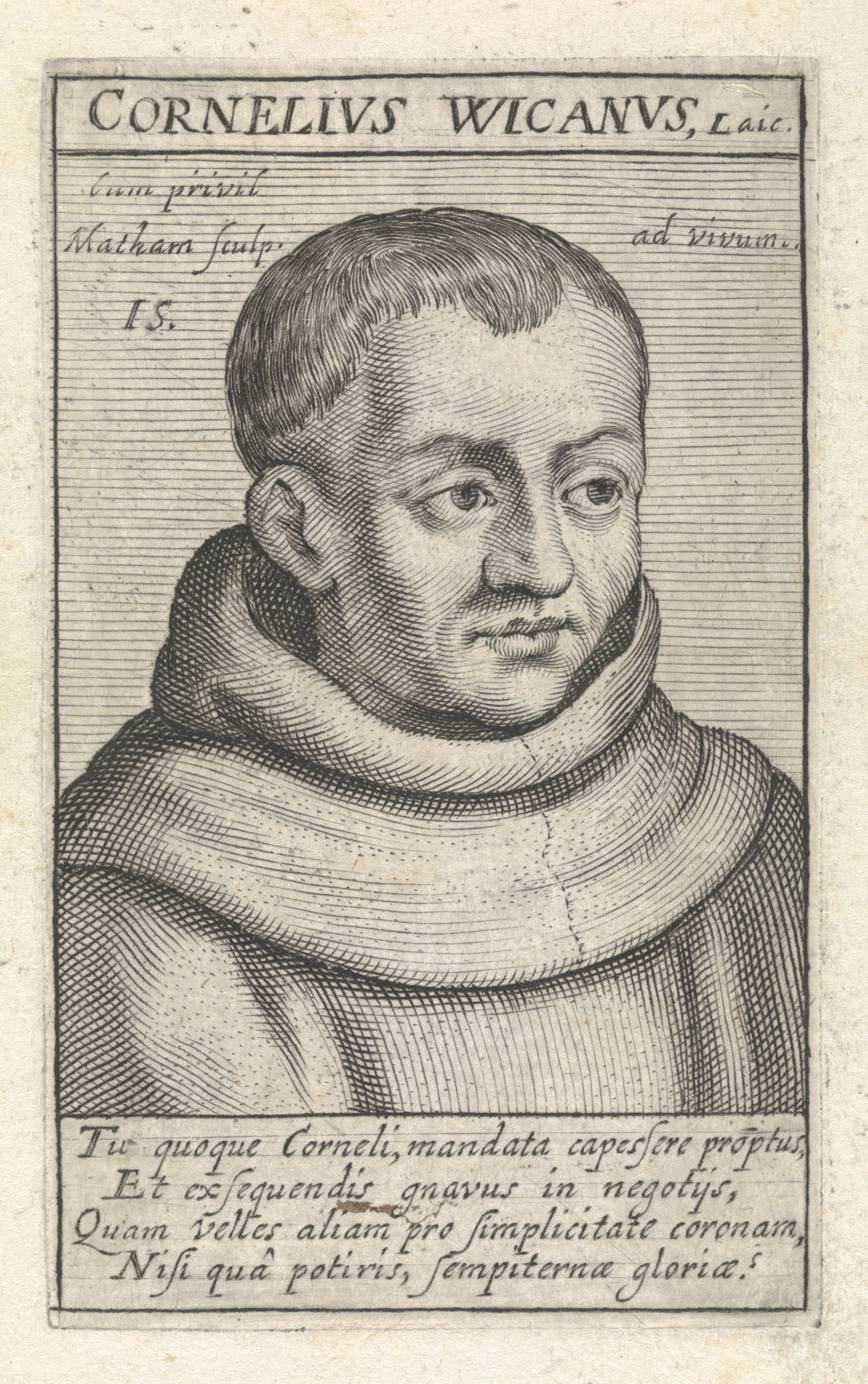
Cornelius van Wijk

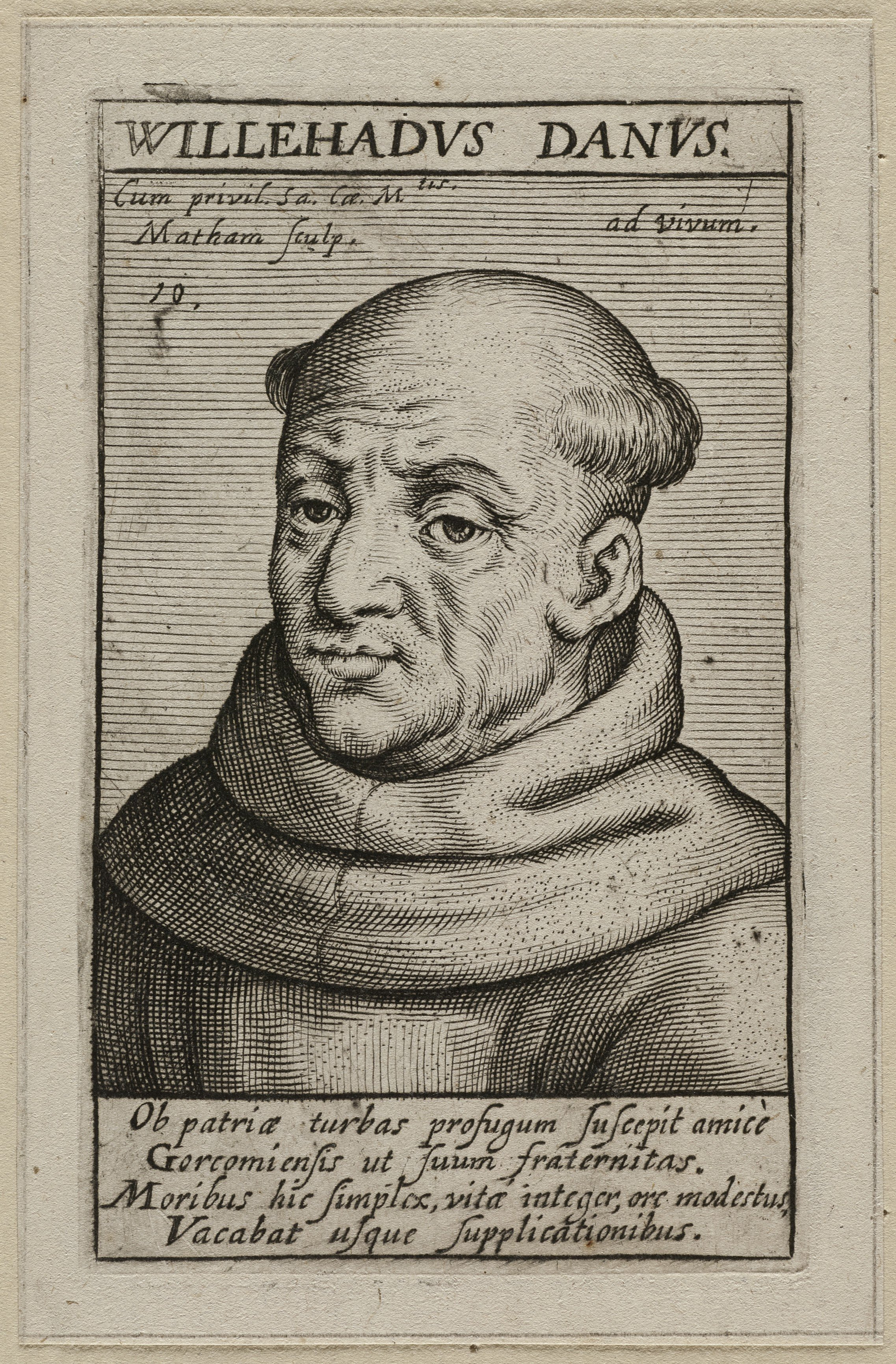
Willehad of Denmark

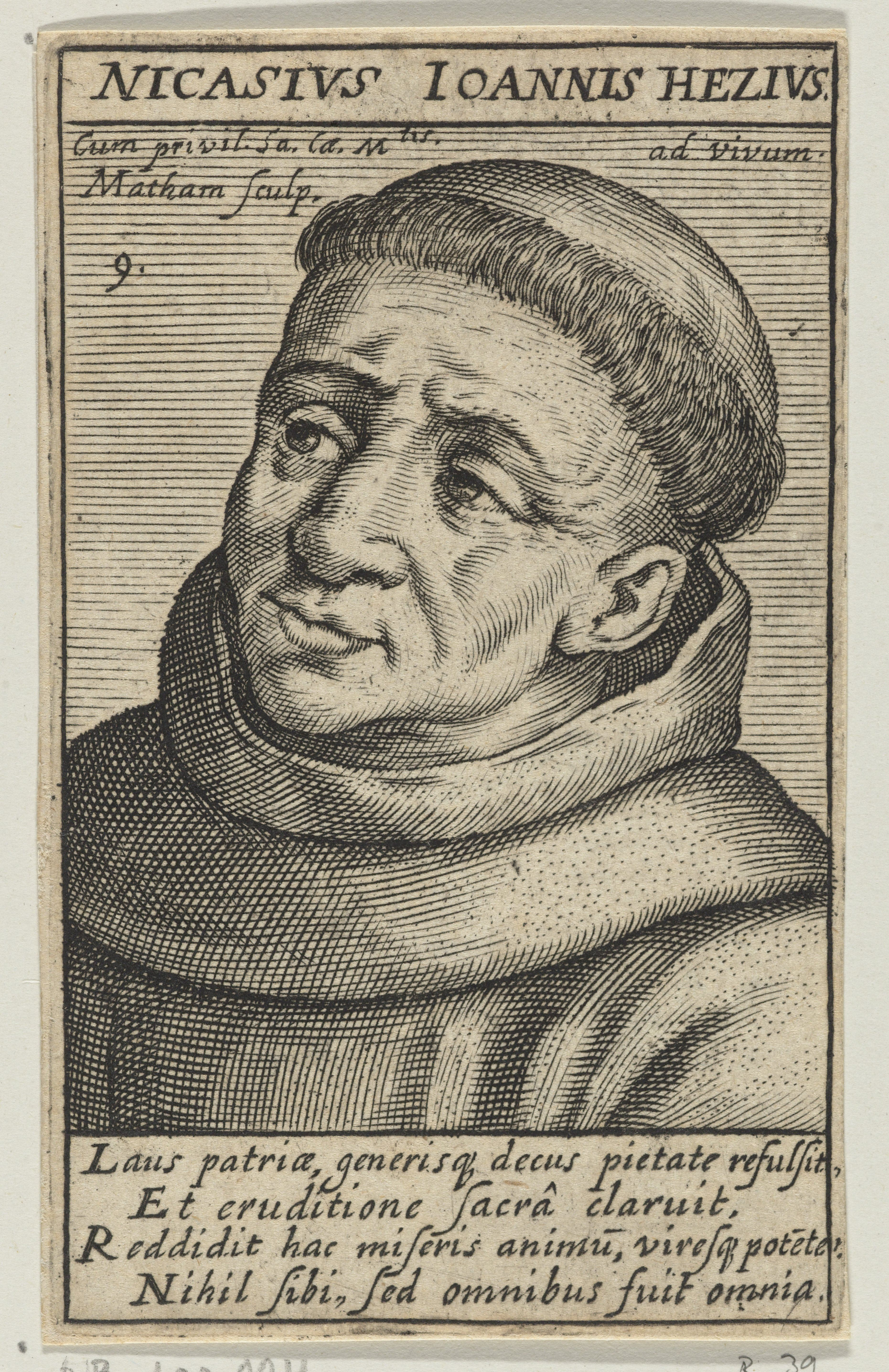
Nicasius of Heeze

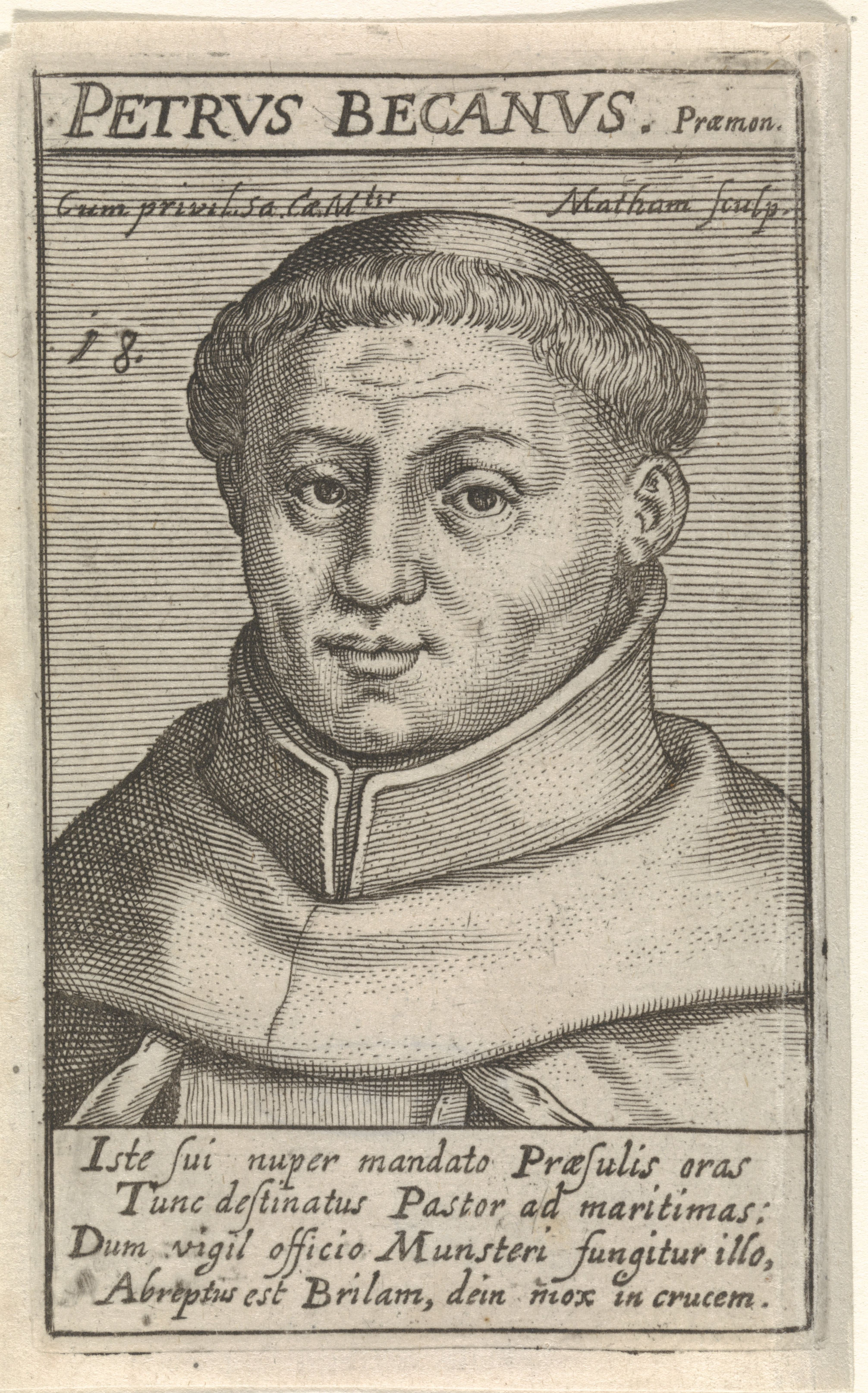
Adriaan van Hilvarenbeek

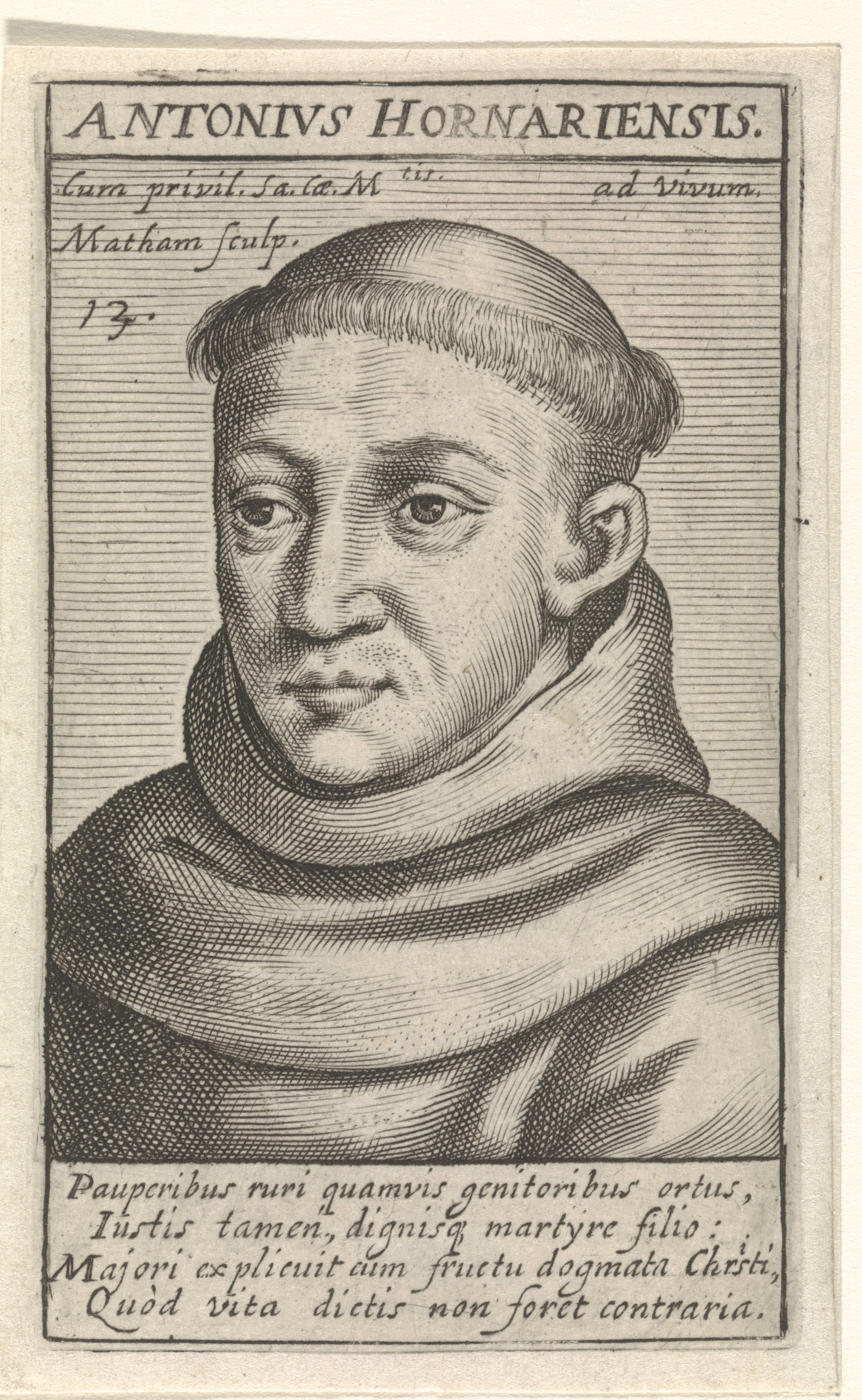
Antonius van Hoornaar

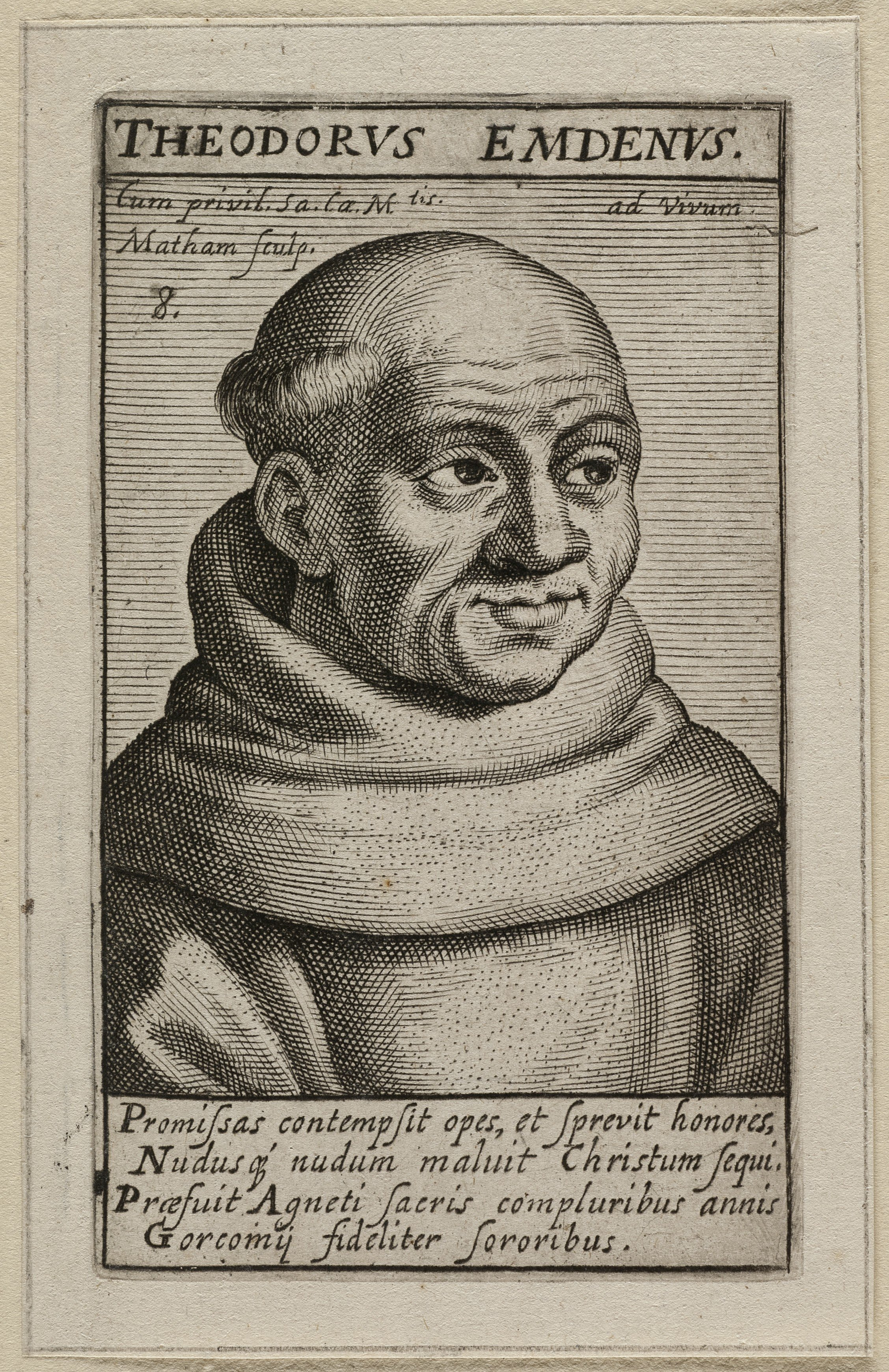
Dirk van der Eem

== See also ==
- Stieltjeskerk
- Martyrs of Alkmaar
- Martyrs of Roermond
