= Franz Alexander Kern =

Austrian priest

Blessed Franz Alexander Kern O. Praem.

Priest
- Born: 11 April 1897; Vienna, Austria-Hungary
- Died: 20 October 1924 (aged 27); Vienna General Hospital, Vienna, First Austrian Republic
- Venerated in: Roman Catholic Church
- Beatified: 21 June 1998, Vienna, Austria by Pope John Paul II
- Feast: 20 October
- Attributes: Premonstratensian habit
- Patronage: Soldiers; Ill people

Franz Alexander Kern (11 April 1897 - 20 October 1924), also known by his religious name Jakob, was an Austrian Roman Catholic priest and a professed member from the Premonstratensians. Kern served as a soldier in the Austro-Hungarian armed forces during World War I and suffered threatening injuries that impeded his health for the remainder of his life and which often hampered his studies. He fostered an intense devotion for the Eucharist - for which he was known - and was often found in constant Eucharistic Adoration.

Kern was beatified on 21 June 1998 in Vienna during the apostolic visit of Pope John Paul II to Austria.

== Life ==
=== Childhood and seminarian ===
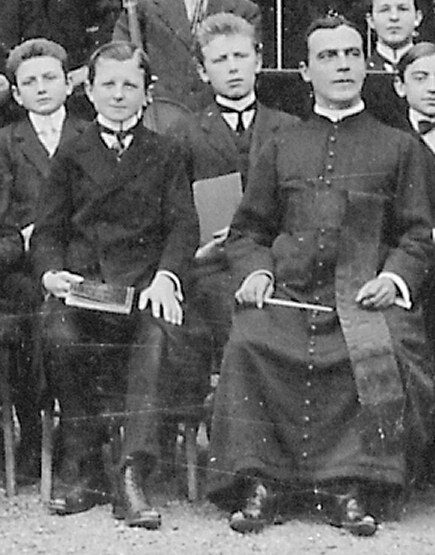
Kern in 1912 with his teacher Franz Lehner.

Franz Alexander Kern was born in Vienna on 11 April 1897 to Franz and Anna Kern at 56 Breitenseerstrasse; he had at least one sister who became a nun. He was baptized in the local parish church on 19 April 1897 with his two names being those of his father and his godfather Alexander Kern.

Before his birth his mother travelled to a Marian shrine to seek protection for her unborn child and made a promise that if it were to be a male she would implore Jesus Christ to call him to the priesthood. Kern's mother died in 1919 and on her deathbed told her son about the promise that she had made back in 1897.

In 1899 he asked his mother where his sister was to which his mother replied "in the church" and so he left the house. His mother searched for him and found him gazing at objects in a store window that had distracted the toddler as he went to go and find his sister. His relieved mother took him home and corrected him for this incident. He also liked to act out a pretend Mass as a child and this seeped into one particular Christmas when he was either four or five: he received a stuffed horse and a train set although he had said he wanted instead an altar with candles and flowers. One friend of his was Aloysius Benesch whose leg, it was thought had to be amputated and so Kern went to his local church begging God to relieve his friend: Benesch's leg healed in full and did not require amputation.

Kern made his First Communion in 1907 while in the third grade and then received his Confirmation - with tears of happiness as was observed - in the fourth grade in 1908 on the Pentecost feast.

In his childhood he exhibited and fostered an ardent dedication to become a priest - his mother instilled in him his religious upbringing - and so in September 1908 was granted permission to become a seminarian in Hollabrunn. It was there that he became noted for his diligent attention to his studies and for spending his free time before the Eucharist in veneration. One of his classmates there was Rudolf Henz. In 1911 he was permitted to take his vows. Also in 1911 he became a member of the Secular Franciscan Order. Kern completed his studies in 1915 and then volunteered straight after to serve in the armed forces where he still maintained his devotion to the Eucharist and attended frequent sessions of Eucharistic Adoration. He was assigned on 7 October 1915 and later moved on 15 October elsewhere as part of his armed service. When he became a seminarian the superiors saw him as being under the required age to enter and so made him take an initial vow on an annual basis until taking his last one on 21 April 1912.

=== Armed service ===
On 1 January 1916 he attended adoration in the church of Saint Blasé in Salzburg and during a 40-hour devotion asked God to allow him to share in the suffering of Jesus Christ. It seemed that this wish was granted for he was sent not long after as a lieutenant during World War I in January 1916 to southern Austria and on 15 May 1916 was sent to the southern border to fight on the Italian front. Before he left for this assignment he spent an hour in adoration at a chapel in Vöckalbruck and he later arrived in Schlunders at 1:30am with limited time for sleep. Kern once injured his knee while serving in an instance that required him to undergo an operation and then rest in bed for under a week. On 10 September 1916 around 4:30am a battle began between Italian and the Austro-Hungarian armed forces and on 11 September 1916 while in combat with Italian troops he was injured after a bullet pierced his lung in what became a permanent wound that he would never recover from. Kern recuperated in Salzburg until 1917. He was also awarded the Medal for Bravery second class for his service. On 20 October 1917 he commenced his theological studies in Vienna but later dropped out in 1920 due to his ill health.

The end of the Great War witnessed a schism for the church in 1919 in the new Czechoslovak Republic in what became heart-wrenching for him and he had even offered himself as a living atonement for Isidore Bogdan Zaradnik - a Norbertine canon who split and led the schism. On 18 October 1920 he received the habit of his order and assumed the name of "Jakob". After his elevation to the diaconate he presided over his first public sermon on 11 July 1922. He soon received his ordination to the priesthood on 23 July 1922 in the cathedral of Saint Stephen from Cardinal Friedrich Gustav Piffl. He celebrated his first solemn Mass at his sister's convent on 1 August 1922.

=== Final illness and death ===
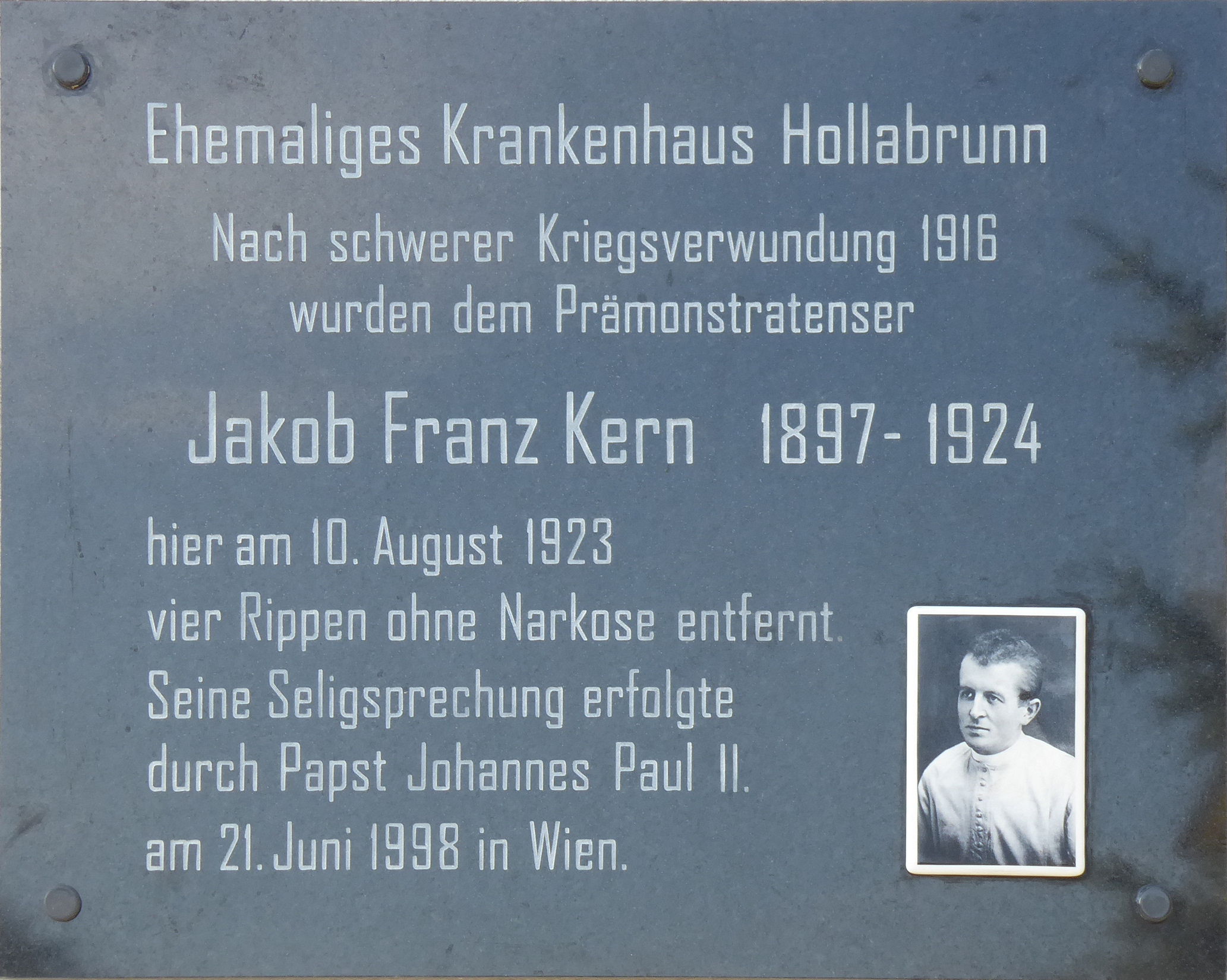
Memorial plaque for Jakob Kern at the former hospital in Hollabrunn.

In 1923 he contracted a bad cold during the Easter season that also saw him suffer from several haemorrhages. Doctors later assessed Kern and concluded that he had to have an operation on 10 August 1923 to remove four of his ribs. Local anesthetic was used and so he had to endure extreme pain and he never recovered from this operation which caused an even greater deterioration in his health - he had also refused to take painkillers during his time of rest. Kern apologized to his surgeon for inconveniences caused during the operation - that being the pain he felt during it. He seemed to recover during a brief respite in Merano but his health deteriorated at a rapid pace not long after in which he had bouts of repeated coughing and spitting blood. He preached his last sermon on 20 July 1924.

Kern was scheduled to make his solemn profession on 20 October 1924 but had to undergo an operation - he still made his profession before the operation. He had predicted that he would die in the operation on 19 October 1924: "Tomorrow I will see the Mother of God and my Guardian Angel" he said to a nun. He also told that nun how he was to be vested in his habit in his coffin which startled the nun due to Kern's bluntness. He had said to an aunt of his on 18 October: "I will not awaken from the surgery on Monday". As he was wheeled to the operating room he said: "I will not return" to his relatives. He died at the Vienna General Hospital during the ringing of the noontime Angelus bells on 20 October 1924. The hospital chaplain gave him the last rites during the procedure. His funeral was celebrated on 22 October at 1:30pm and a solemn requiem Mass was said on 25 October at 10:00am in which the abbot Emilian Greisl presided over.

=== Exhumation ===
His remains were exhumed on 26 September 1956 in which one priest who knew him saw the remains and exclaimed: "This is he! Yes it is he!" It became impossible for the skeletal remains to be lifted in one piece since the bones fell apart when the coffin was opened in addition to the lower portion of the coffin being corroded. His remains still had remnants of flesh on bones in addition to skin and hair being present on some parts of the skull. His right hand was still connected to the lower arm and was preserved to the wrist including the nails and tendons.

== Beatification ==
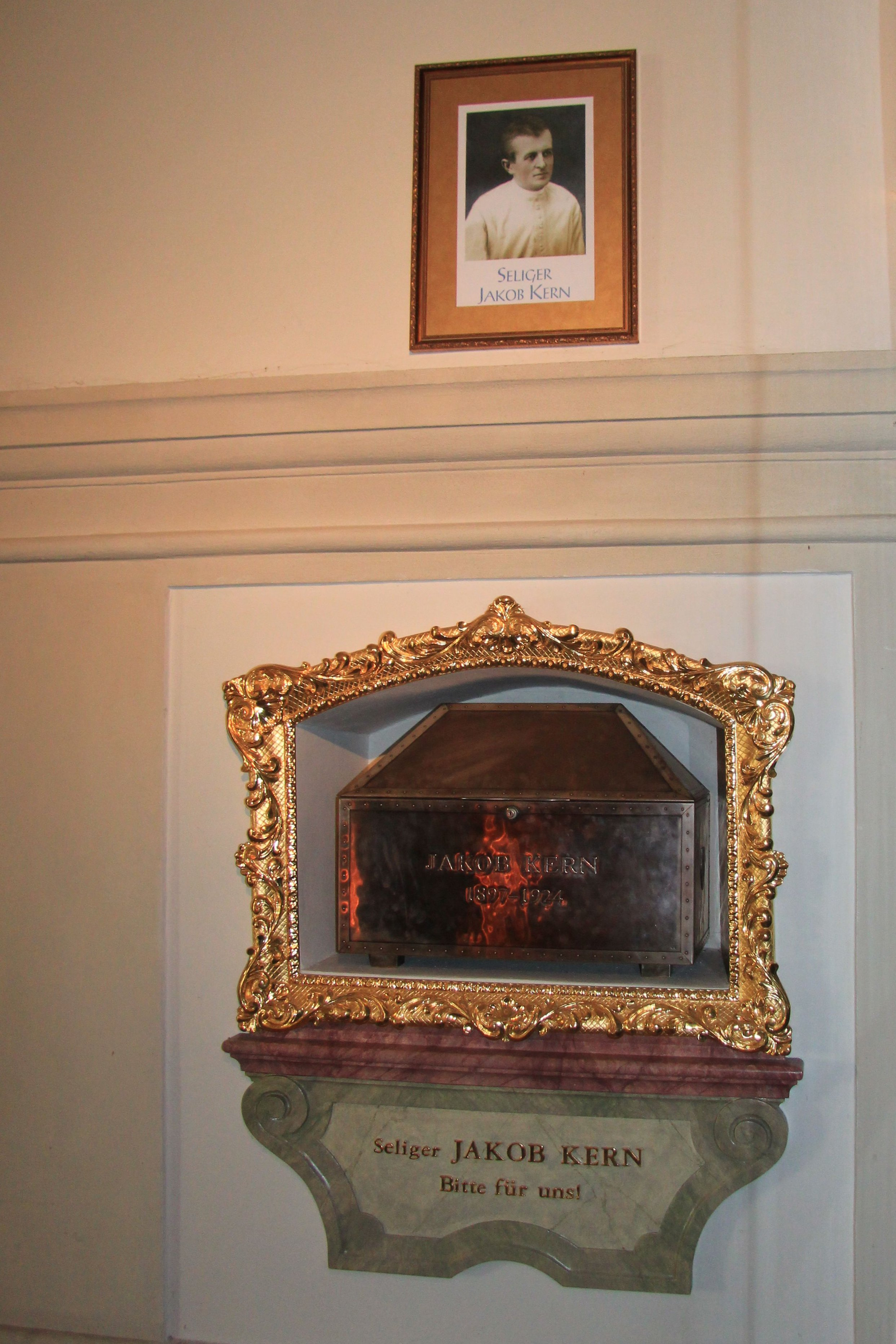
Relics.

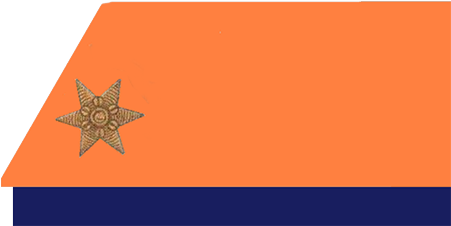
The insignia of a lieutenant - his rank in the armed forces.

The formal request for the canonization cause to open was lodged with the Congregation for Rites in Rome on 15 November 1956 and the latter department allowed for it to open in Vienna where its metropolitan archbishop Franz König inaugurated the diocesan process on 18 March 1958 and oversaw its closure before his retirement in 1985.

The formal introduction to the cause came on 2 July 1985 after Kern was titled as a Servant of God and the Congregation for the Causes of Saints issued the official "nihil obstat" ('nothing against' to the cause). The C.C.S. later validated the diocesan process on 4 June 1993 and received the official Positio dossier not long after this in 1993. Theologians issued their approval to the cause on 17 February 1995 while the C.C.S. met and also voted in favor of the cause on 6 June 1995. Kern was proclaimed to be Venerable on 11 July 1985 after Pope John Paul II confirmed the fact that Kern had lived a model Christian life of heroic virtue both cardinal and theological.

The investigation for a miracle occurred in the diocese of its origin and received C.C.S. validation in Rome on 20 May 1994 before it was passed to a medical board on 4 July 1996 who approved the miracle. Theologians also approved it on 24 January 1997 and the cardinal and bishop members of the C.C.S. followed suit on 15 April 1997 before John Paul II issued his final approval to the miracle on 7 July 1997.

John Paul II beatified Kern on 21 June 1998 on his apostolic visit to Austria.

The current postulator assigned to the cause is the Rev. Gabriel Wolf.
