= September 17 (Eastern Orthodox liturgics) =

Day in the Eastern Orthodox liturgical calendar

Eastern Orthodox liturgical calendar
September 16	September 17	September 18
September 17 O.S. ≍ September 30 N.S. September 17 N.S ≍ September 4 O.S.

An Eastern Orthodox cross

September 17 in Eastern Orthodox liturgical calendars is a feast day and a day of commemoration of saints and martyrs. Although some Orthodox churches use the Revised Julian Calendar and others use the traditional Julian calendar, the fixed commemorations for their respective September 17 are broadly the same, no matter which calendar is used. (Note: Despite the dates being the same, the days to which they refer typically differ by 13 days. The notation Old Style or O.S. is sometimes used to indicate a date in the traditional Julian Calendar (the "Old Calendar"). The notation New Style or N.S. indicates a date in the Revised Julian calendar (the "New Calendar").)

== Feasts ==
- Afterfeast of the Exaltation of the Cross.

== Saints ==
- Hieromartyrs Heraclides and Myron, Bishops of Tamassos in Cyprus (1st century) (Note: Heraclides was the son of a pagan priest and lived in the village Lambadistis, in Cyprus. His father, although a pagan, was hospitable and did not hesitate to accommodate the Apostle Paul together with Barnabas and Mark when they came to Cyprus. The Apostles led Heraclides in the footsteps of Christ, and he in turn, led his parents. Saint Paul appointed him Bishop of Tamassos in Cyprus. Heraclides worked with great zeal along with his disciple Myron, for the dissemination of Christianity with impressive results, and many pagans believed in Christ. His successes however agitated the unbelievers, who killed them by burning them alive.)
- Martyrs Sophia and her three daughters Faith (Vera), Hope (Nadezhda), and Love (Lyubov), at Rome (c. 137) (Note: Name days celebrated today include: Sophia (Σοφία); Elpida, Nadezhda, Nadia (Ἐλπίδα); Agape, Lyubov, Luba (Ἀγάπη).)
- Martyr Agathocleia (230) (Note: "The same day, St. Agathoclia, servant of an infidel woman, who was for a long time subjected by her to blows and other afflictions, that she might deny Christ. She was finally presented to the judge and cruelly lacerated, and as she persisted in confessing the faith, they cut off her tongue and threw her into the flames.") (Note: Name days celebrated today include: Agathocleia (Ἀγαθόκλεια); Agathocles (Ἀγαθοκλής).)
- Martyr Theodota of Cappadocia, at Nicaea (230)
- Martyrs Lucy and her son Geminian of Rome (303)
- 156 Martyrs of Palestine, including (310):

- Peleus and Nilus, Bishops of Egypt;
- Zeno, Priest;
- Patermuthius and Elias, noblemen, by fire.

- Martyrs Maximus, Theodotus and Asclepiodotus, of Marcianopolis in Thrace. (see also: September 15)
- Saints Charalampus and Pantelon, and companions. (Note: Their Synaxis is celebrated a second time. Hymn (in Greek): Χαίρων ὑπῆρχε πρὸς σφαγὴν Χαραλάμπης, Καὶ Παντολέων πρὸς μάχαιραν ἦν λέων.)

== Pre-Schism Western saints ==
- Saint Flocellus, a youth martyred in Autun in France under the Emperor Marcus Aurelius (161-180) (Note: After being tortured, he was flung half-dead to the wild beasts in the amphitheatre.) (Note: "At Autun, under the emperor Antoninus and the governor Valerian, St. Flocellus, a boy, who, after many sufferings, was torn to pieces by wild beasts, and thus won the crown of martyrs.")
- Saint Justin the Confessor, a priest in Rome who devoted himself to burying the bodies of martyrs and was eventually martyred himself (259) (Note: "At Rome, on the road to Tivoli, the birthday of St. Justin, priest and martyr, who distinguished himself by a glorious confession of the faith, during the persecution of Valerian and Gallienus. He buried the bodies of the blessed pontiff, Xystus, of Lawrence, Hippolytus, and many other saints, and finally consummated his martyrdom under Claudius." His relics were later transferred to Frisingen in Germany.)
- Saints Narcissus and Crescendo, early martyrs in Rome (c. 260)
- Saints Socrates and Stephen, by tradition early martyrs venerated in Britain, now England. (Note: "All the ancient and modern martyrologies commemorate on this day the martyrdom of Stephen and Socrates, as having taken place in Britain. We have no record of their history, but it is conjectured that they suffered in the persecution of Diocletian, and about the same time with St. Alban, as it is known that many of both sexes then sacrificed their lives for the Faith. The scene of their passion was probably in Monmouthshire or South Wales, as churches were dedicated to them in that district.")
- Saint Theodora, a noble lady of Rome devoted to the service of the martyrs during the persecution of Diocletian (c. 305) (Note: "At Rome, in the persecution of Diocletian, St. Theodora, a matron, who carefully ministered to the martyrs.")
- Saint Satyrus of Milan, elder brother of St Ambrose of Milan in Italy (376) (Note: As a lawyer he undertook the administration of the affairs of his brother's household. His high sense of justice, his integrity and his generosity were praised by St Ambrose in his funeral sermon for him.) (Note: "At Milan, the departure from this world of St. Satyrus, confessor, whose distinguished merits are mentioned by his brother, St. Ambrose.")
- Saint Rodingus (Rouin), a monk and priest from Ireland who preached in Germany and entered the monastery of Tholey near Trier (c. 690) (Note: He moved to the Forest of Argonne in France where he founded the monastery of Wasloi, later known as Beaulieu.)
- Hieromartyr Lambert of Maastricht, Bishop of Maastricht (704) (Note: Born in Maastricht in Netherlands, he became bishop there in 668, but in 674 he was driven out by the tyrant Ebroin. He then lived as a monk for seven years at the monastery of Stavelot in Belgium. He returned later and did much to help St Willibrord. He was murdered in the then village of Liège and is venerated as a martyr.) (Note: "At Liege, blessed Lambert, bishop of Maestricht. Having, through zeal for religion, rebuked the royal family, he was undeservedly put to death by the guilty, and thus entered the court of the heavenly kingdom, to enjoy it forever.")
- Saint Columba, a nun at Tábanos, martyred in Cordoba in Spain for rejecting Islam (853) (Note: Born in Cordoba and a nun at Tábanos, she was driven from there by the Moorish persecution of 852. She took refuge in Cordoba in Spain, where, being called on to deny Christ, she openly rejected Mohammed and was beheaded.)
- Saint Unni (Uni, Unno, Huno), a monk at New Corvey in Germany, who became Bishop of Bremen-Hamburg in 917 (936) (Note: He helped enlighten Sweden and Denmark and reposed in Birka in Sweden. Unni is revered as third Apostle of the North, after Ansgar and Rimbert of Turholt.)

== Post-Schism Orthodox saints ==
- Saint Euxiphius of Cyprus, monk (12th century) (Note: His memory is noted in the "Small Euchologion or Agiasmatarion", published by Apostoliki Diakonia in 1956, without any other references. His memory is not recorded anywhere else. He may be confused with the Saint that is commemorated on February 17 - St. Euxiphius I, Bishop and Wonderworker, who is listed in some synaxaria as one of the "300 Allemagne Saints" in Cyprus (late 12th century).)
- Venerable Anastasius of Perioteron, in Cyprus, Wonderworker (12th century)
- Saint Joachim I, Patriarch of Alexandria (1567)
- Saint Innocent, Archimandrite, of Glinsk Hermitage (1888)
- Saint Dionisie Erhan of Ismail and Cetatea Alba (1934-1943), in the Metropolis of Bessarabia (1943) (Note: (in Romanian) "A fost aprobată solicitarea Sinodului mitropolitan al Mitropoliei Basarabiei de canonizare a Episcopului Dionisie Erhan al Cetății Albe-Ismail (1934-1943). Sfântul Ierarh Dionisie, Episcopul Cetății Albe-Ismail, va fi înscris în Calendarul Bisericii Ortodoxe Române și prăznuit anual în ziua de 17 septembrie.": See: (in Romanian) Dionisie Erhan. Wikipedia. (Romanian Wikipedia).) (Note: During the consolidation works at Suruceni Monastery on July 10, 2018, the body of Bishop Dionisie Erhan was found to be incorrupt.)

=== New martyrs and confessors ===
- New Hieromartyrs of the St. Nicholas Koryazha Monastery, Arkhangelsk (1918): (Note: See: (in Russian) Коряжемский Николаевский монастырь. Википедии. (Russian Wikipedia).)

- Paul (Moiseyev) and Theodosius (Sobolev), Archimandrites;
- Nicodemus (Shchapkov) and Seraphim (Kulakov), Hieromonks.

- Virgin-martyr Irene Frolov (1931)
- New Hieromartyrs of the Katyn massacre (1940): (Note: The Polish Orthodox Council of Bishops initially approved their canonization on March 18, 2025. Their feast day has been designated as September 17.)

- Saint Szymon Fedorońko, Archpriest, Colonel, chief chaplain for the Orthodox in the Polish army. (Note: See: (in Polish) Szymon Fedorońko. Wikipedii. (Polish Wikipedia).)
- Saint Wiktor Romanowski, Archpriest, Lieutenant Colonel, a military chaplain. (Note: See: (in Polish) Wiktor Romanowski. Wikipedii. (Polish Wikipedia).)
- Saint Włodzimierz Ochab, Archpriest, Major, a military and prison chaplain. (Note: See: (in Polish) Włodzimierz Ochab. Wikipedii. (Polish Wikipedia).)

- Martyr John Korotkov (1941)
- Virgin-martyr Alexandra Hvorostyannikova (1943)

== Other commemorations ==
- Icon of the Mother of God of Constantinople ("Tsaregrad") (1071) (Note: The Constantinople Icon commemorated today is probably the prototype of another Constantinople Icon (April 25) venerated at Moscow’s Dormition church on Malaya Dimitrovka.) (Note: "The locally honored Constantinople Icon of the Mother God is found in the Old Rus Cathedral (Novgorod Diocese). The icon by measurement is 2 diuma (2 inches), and was beaten out on a slate board. According to tradition, in ancient times two monks from Constantinople, passing through Old Rus, attended the liturgy in the Cathedral and left this icon there as a memorial. A great many believers streamed to this holy icon and took the water consecrated by immersing the holy icon in it, with the hope of healing sick babies.")
- Icon of the Mother of God of Macariev ("Directress") (1442) (Note: "The Makar'ev "Hodegetria" ("Way-Guide") Icon of the Mother of God appeared during the reign of prince Vasilii Vasil'evich the Dark (1425-1462) to the Monk Makarii the Wonderworker, who asceticised on the desolate shores of the River Unzha. On 17 September 1442 at about the third hour of the morning, when the Monk Makarii was finishing his usual morning akathist song to the Most Holy Mother of God, his cell was illumined suddenly by an unknown light. The monk became confused in spirit and began fervently to pray. Beyond the cell walls he heard the angelic refrain: "Hail, Thou Full of Grace, O Mother Unwedded!" With fear and astonishment the monk went out from his cell and on the northwest horizon he saw the icon of the Mother of God, surrounded by a luminous radiance. The icon approached towards the cell of the ascetic. With joyful trembling the monk fell to the ground and cried out: "Hail, Mother of God! Hail, Thou Ever-Flowing Fount issuing salvation to all the world and assuring protection and intercession to all the Galich land!" He reverently took up the icon and placed it in his cell, whereby it also came to be named the "Cell-Icon". Afterwards the disciples of the monk gave it the title of "Makar'ev". On the place of the appearance of the holy icon was founded a monastery, likewise named Makar'ev. From the Makar'ev Icon of the Mother of God there were made copies, which became reknown(sic) just like the original.")
- Repose of Blessed Agapitus (1825), disciple of St. Tikhon of Zadonsk.
- Repose of lay recluse Matthew of St. Petersburg (1904)

== Icon gallery ==
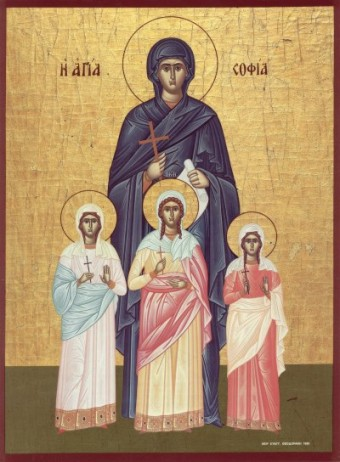
Martyrs Sophia and her three daughters Faith, Hope, and Love.

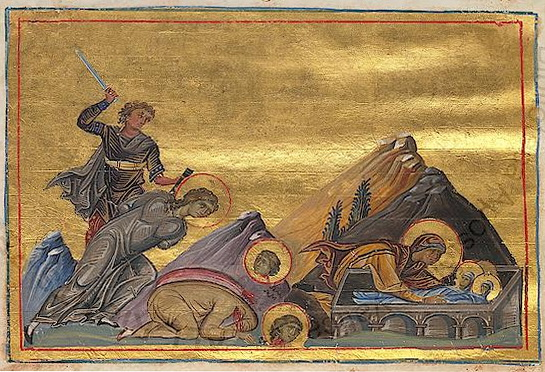
Martyrs Sophia and her three daughters Faith, Hope, and Love.
(Menologion of Basil II, 10th century).

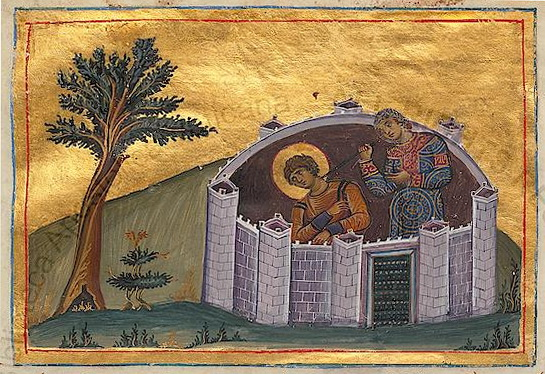
Martyr Agathocleia.
(Menologion of Basil II, 10th century).

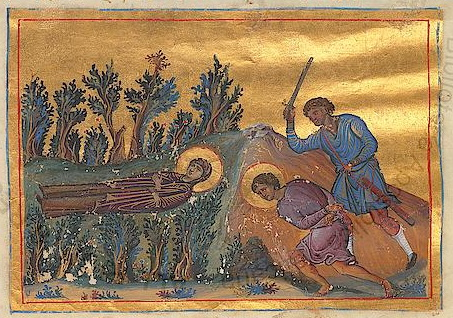
Martyrs Lucy and her son Geminian of Rome.
(Menologion of Basil II, 10th century).

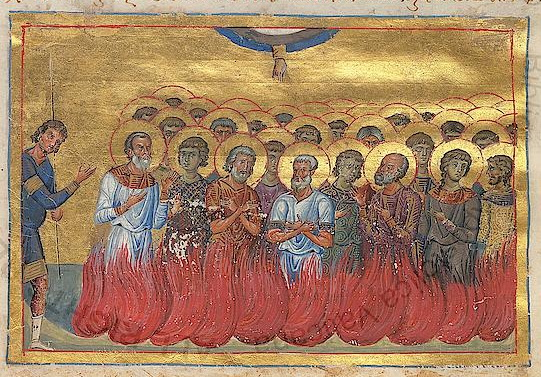
156 Martyrs of Palestine.
(Menologion of Basil II, 10th century).

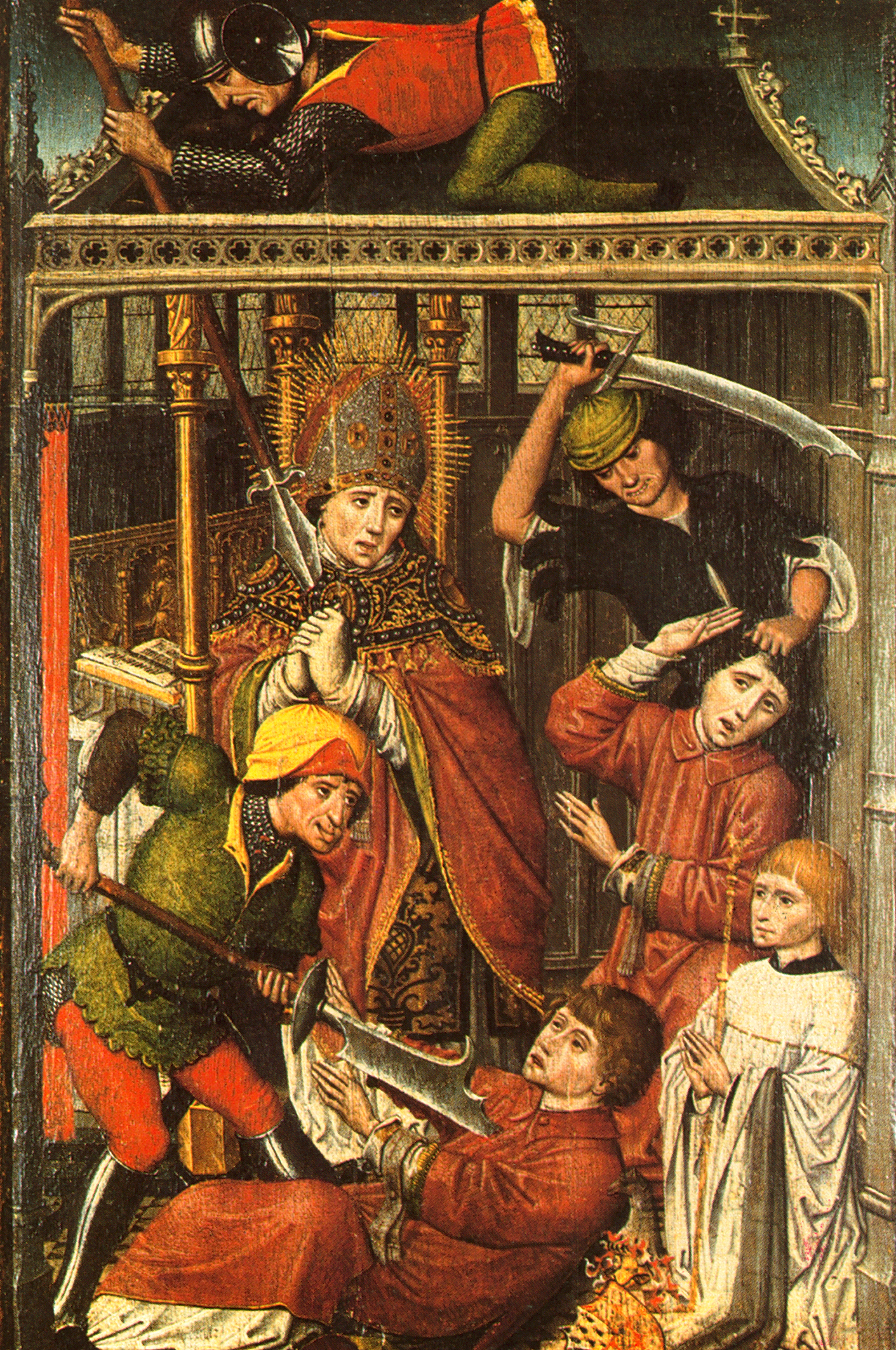
Martyrdom of St. Lambert of Maastricht.

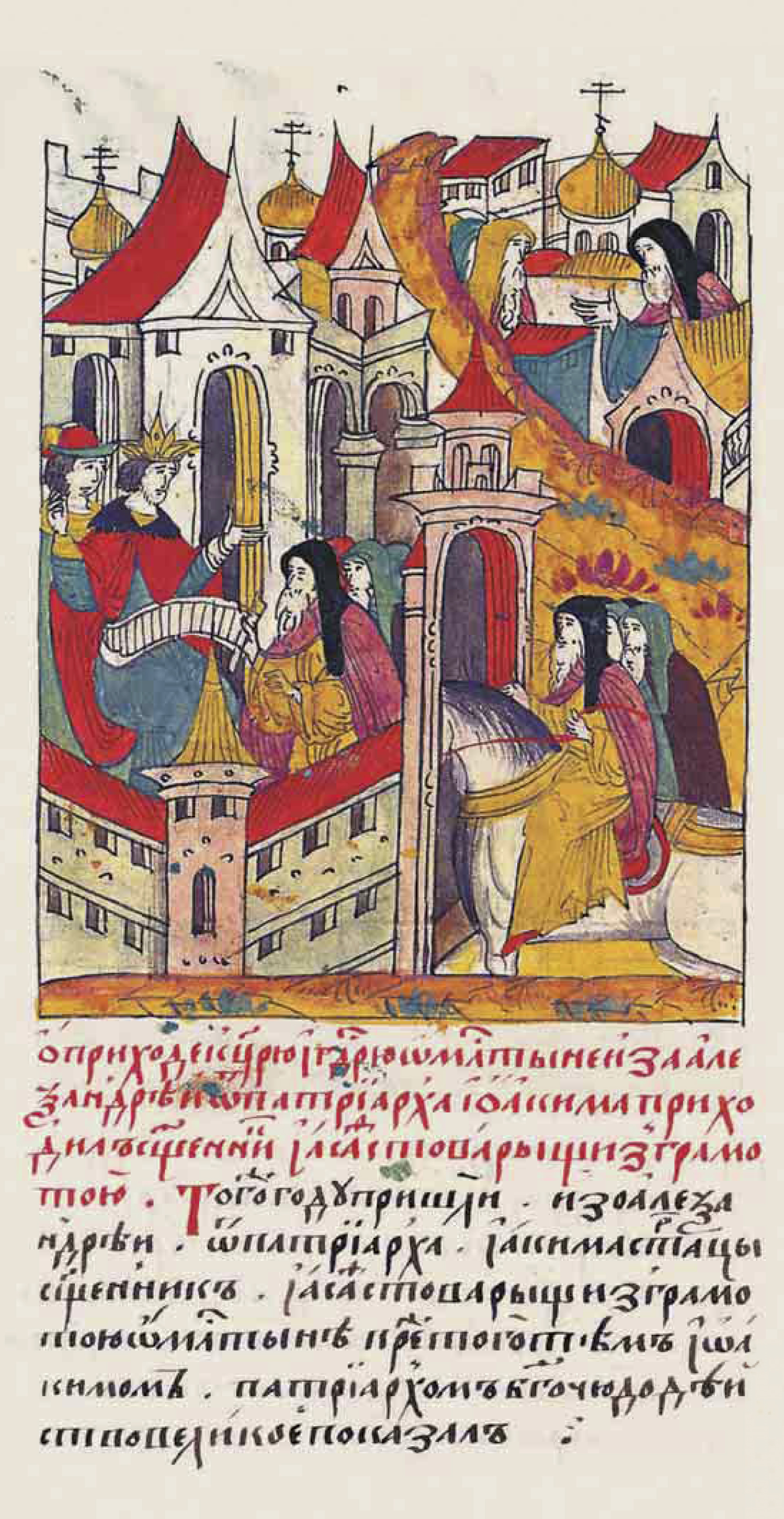
Patriarch Joachim I sending ambassadors to Tsar Ivan IV.

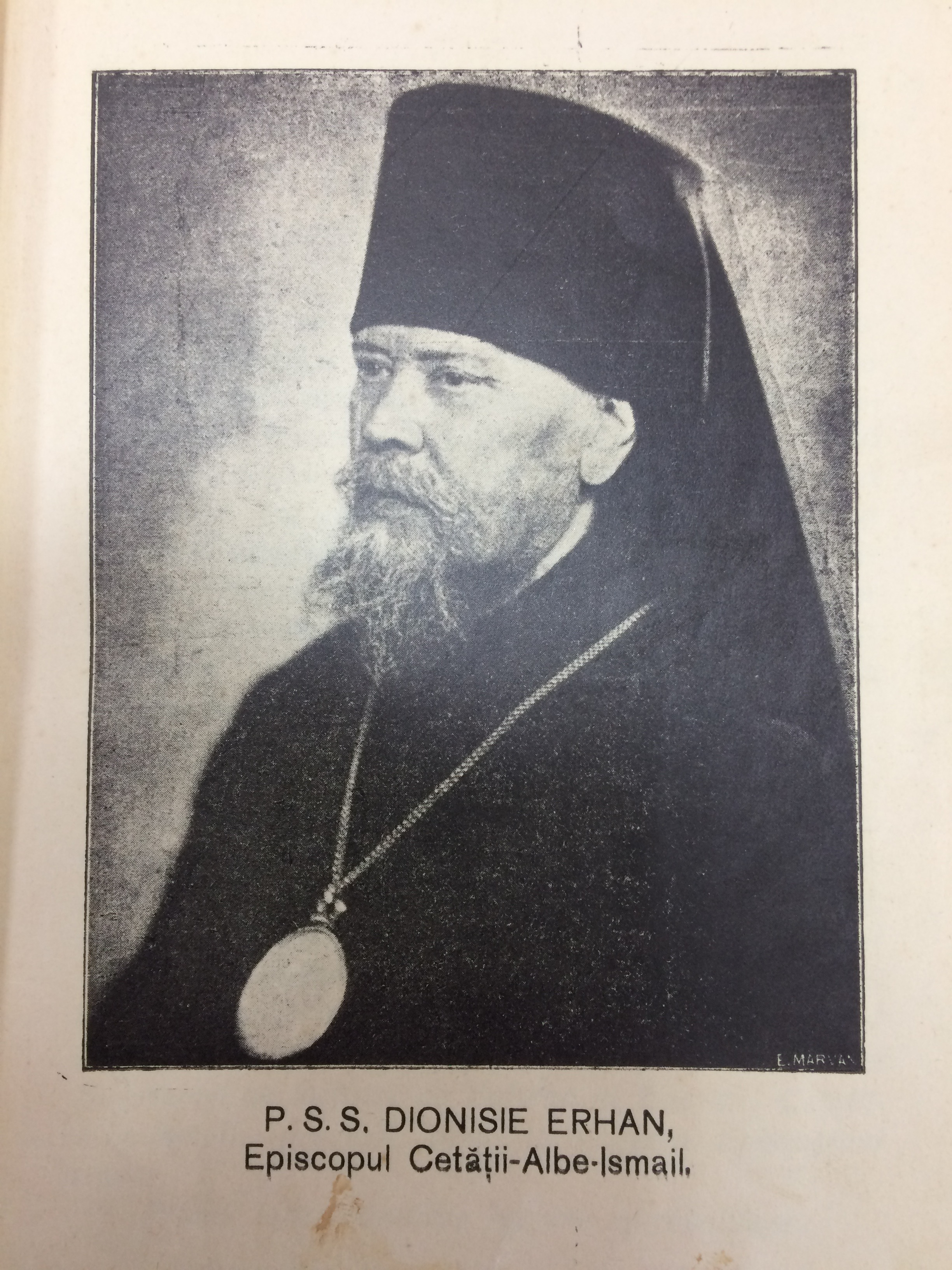
St. Dionisie Erhan of Ismail and Cetatea Alba.

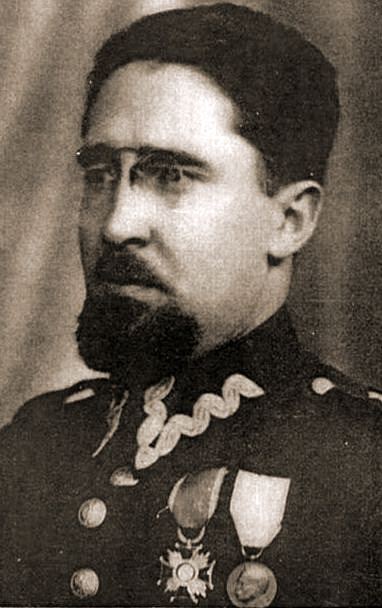
New Hieromartyr Szymon Fedorońko, Archpriest.

== Sources ==
- September 17/September 30. Orthodox Calendar (PRAVOSLAVIE.RU).
- September 30 / September 17. HOLY TRINITY RUSSIAN ORTHODOX CHURCH (A parish of the Patriarchate of Moscow).
- September 17. OCA - The Lives of the Saints.
- The Autonomous Orthodox Metropolia of Western Europe and the Americas (ROCOR). St. Hilarion Calendar of Saints for the year of our Lord 2004. St. Hilarion Press (Austin, TX). p. 69.
- The Seventeenth Day of the Month of September. Orthodoxy in China.
- September 17. Latin Saints of the Orthodox Patriarchate of Rome.
- The Roman Martyrology. Transl. by the Archbishop of Baltimore. Last Edition, According to the Copy Printed at Rome in 1914. Revised Edition, with the Imprimatur of His Eminence Cardinal Gibbons. Baltimore: John Murphy Company, 1916. pp. 286–288.
- Rev. Richard Stanton. A Menology of England and Wales, or, Brief Memorials of the Ancient British and English Saints Arranged According to the Calendar, Together with the Martyrs of the 16th and 17th Centuries. London: Burns & Oates, 1892. p. 451.

Greek Sources

- Great Synaxaristes: (in Greek) 17 ΣΕΠΤΕΜΒΡΙΟΥ. ΜΕΓΑΣ ΣΥΝΑΞΑΡΙΣΤΗΣ.
- (in Greek) Συναξαριστής. 17 Σεπτεμβρίου. ECCLESIA.GR. (H ΕΚΚΛΗΣΙΑ ΤΗΣ ΕΛΛΑΔΟΣ).
- (in Greek) 17/09/2026. Ορθόδοξος Συναξαριστής.

Russian Sources

- (in Russian) 30 сентября (17 сентября). Православная Энциклопедия под редакцией Патриарха Московского и всея Руси Кирилла (электронная версия). (Orthodox Encyclopedia - Pravenc.ru).
- (in Russian) 17 сентября по старому стилю / 30 сентября по новому стилю. Русская Православная Церковь - Православный церковный календарь на 2026 год.
