= June 15 (Eastern Orthodox liturgics) =

Day in the Eastern Orthodox liturgical calendar

Eastern Orthodox liturgical calendar
June 14	June 15	June 16
June 15 O.S. ≍ June 28 N.S. June 15 N.S ≍ June 2 O.S.

An Eastern Orthodox cross

June 15 in Eastern Orthodox liturgical calendars is a feast day and a day of commemoration of saints and martyrs. Although some Orthodox churches use the Revised Julian Calendar and others use the traditional Julian calendar, the fixed commemorations for their respective June 15 are broadly the same, no matter which calendar is used. (Note: Despite the dates being the same, the days to which they refer typically differ by 13 days. The notation Old Style or O.S. is sometimes used to indicate a date in the traditional Julian Calendar (the "Old Calendar"). The notation New Style or N.S. indicates a date in the Revised Julian calendar (the "New Calendar").)

== Saints ==
- Prophet Amos (8th century BC)
- Apostles Fortunatus, Achaicus, and Stephanas, of the Seventy Apostles (1st century)
- Saint Cedronus (Kedron), Patriarch of Alexandria (107)
- Martyr Hesychius the Soldier, of Dorostolum, and two others, in Moesia (297) (Note: "At Dorostorum, in Mysia, St. Hesychius, a soldier, who was arrested with blessed Julius, and after him crowned with martyrdom, under the governor Maximus.")
- Martyrs Vitus, Modestus, and Crescentia, at Lucania (c. 303) (Note: Fleeing from Sicily, they were all martyred in Italy under Diocletian. St Vitus is called on in prayer against epilepsy and the nervous disorder called St Vitus's dance.) (Note: "IN Basilicata, near the river Silaro, the birthday of the holy martyrs Vitus, Modestus, and Crescentia, who were brought thither from Sicily, in the reign of Diocletian, and after being plunged into a vessel of melted lead, after being exposed to the beasts, and on the pillory, from which torments they escaped uninjured through the power of God, they ended their religious combats." Name days celebrated today include: Vitus, Vito (Βίτος).)
- Virgin-martyrs Libya and Leonides, sisters, and Eutropia, a girl of twelve years, at Palmyra, in Syria (304) (Note: "At Palmyra, in Syria, the holy martyrs Libya and Leonides, sisters, and Eutropia, a girl of twelve years, who won the crown of martyrdom by various torments.")
- Martyr Dulas of Cilicia (c. 305–313) (Note: "At Zephirium, in Cilicia, St. Dulas, martyr, who, under the governor Maximus, was, for the name of Christ, scourged, laid on the gridiron, scalded with boiling oil, and after enduring other trials, received for his victory the palm of martyrdom.")
- Martyr Grace, by the sword.
- Martyr Nerses.
- Saint Ortisios (Orsiesius) of Tabennisi, disciple of St. Pachomius the Great (c. 308 or 380)
- Blessed Jerome (Hieronymus) of Stridonium (419-420) (see also: September 30 - West)
- Saint Augustine, Bishop of Hippo (430), and his mother St. Monica of Tagaste (387) (Note: Name days celebrated today include: Augustine, Augoustinos (Αὐγουστίνος).) (see also: August 28)
- Saint Dulas the Passion bearer, of Egypt (5th century)
- Saint Michael I of Kiev, first Metropolitan of Kiev (992)
- Venerable Joseph of Bethlehem, monk.

== Pre-Schism Western saints ==
- Saint Abraham of Clermont, Abbot, of Auvergne in Gaul, Wonderworker (477) (Note: Born on the banks of the Euphrates, he travelled to Egypt, where he fell among thieves who held him prisoner for five years. He escaped and travelled to France. There he settled near Clermont in Auvergne as a hermit. Eventually he became abbot of the monastery of St Cyriacus (St Cyrgnes). He is called on in prayer against fever.) (Note: "At Clermont, in Auvergne, St. Abraham, confessor, illustrious by his holiness and miracles.")
- Saint Melanius II, Bishop of Viviers in France (c. 549)
- Saint Trillo of Llandrillo (Drillo, Drel), patron saint of two places in Gwynedd in Wales (6th century)
- Saint Vouga (Vougar, Veho, Feock, Fiech), a bishop from Ireland who settled in Brittany and lived there as a hermit near Lesneven (6th century) (Note: "S. VOUGAS, or Vie, is venerated especially at Treguenec, in Brittany, where his relics is said to have been preserved. He is thought to have been an Irish bishop who mounted a stone, and sailed across the sea on it; a tradition which has sprung up from the fact of a rock off the coast being called the Ship, from a fancied resemblance to one; and then, in course of time, it was supposed to be S. Vie's ship.")
- Saint Landelinus, former brigand who underwent a Christian conversion and became a monastic founder (c. 686) (Note: Born near Bapaume, Landelinus lived for a time as a robber, but he repented and became a monk. He was later ordained and founded monasteries in France and Belgium, at Lobbes in 654, Aulne (656), Walers (657) and Crespin (Crepy) in 670.) (Note: "At Valenciennes, the decease of St. Landelin, abbot.")
- Saints Domitian and Hadelin (Adelinus), two disciples of St Landelinus at Lobbes in Belgium (c. 686)
- Saint Constantine, Bishop of Beauvais (706) (Note: A monk with St Philibert at Jumièges in France and then Bishop of Beauvais.)
- Saint Benildis, martyr of Córdoba, Spain (853) (Note: A woman of Cordoba in Spain who was so moved by the courage of the priest Athanasius during his martyrdom at the hands of the Moors, that she braved death at the stake on the following day. Her ashes were thrown into the Guadalquivir.)
- Saint Edburgh of Winchester (Edburga), daughter of Edward the Elder and granddaughter of Alfred the Great (960) (Note: She was placed as a child in the convent which King Alfred's widow had founded in Winchester in England. Her shrine in Pershore in Worcestershire was famous for its miracles.)

== Post-Schism Orthodox saints ==
- Venerable Sabbas the Fool-for-Christ, of Vatopedi monastery, Mount Athos (1350) (see also: October 5 )
- Saint Spyridon, Serbian Patriarch (1389)
- Great-martyr Tsar Lazar of Serbia (1389)
- Saint Ephraim, Serbian Patriarch (1400)
- Saint Symeon of Novgorod, Archbishop of Novgorod (1421) (Note: See: (in Russian) Симеон (архиепископ Новгородский). Википедии. (Russian Wikipedia).)
- Saint Jonah of Moscow, Metropolitan and Wonderworker of Kiev, Moscow, and all Russia (1461) (see also: March 31 )
- Saints Sergius and Barbara of Oyatsk, monastics, parents of St. Alexander of Svir (1477-1480)
- Monk-martyrs Gregory, Abbot, and Cassian, monk, of Avnezhk Monastery in Vologda, Wonderworkers (1524)

=== New martyrs and confessors ===
- New Hieromartyr Amos Ivanov, Priest (1918)

== Other commemorations ==
- Translation of the relics (c. 9th century) of Saint Theodore the Sykeote, Bishop of Anastasiopolis (613)
- Synaxis of All New Martyrs of the Serbian Land ("Vidovdan").
- "Marianica" Icon of the Most Holy Theotokos.
- Repose of Elder Theophan of the Roslavl Forests and Optina (1819)
- Repose of Blessed Jonah, Fool-for-Christ, of Peshnosha Monastery (1838)
- Repose of Metropolitan Innocent of Peking (1931) (Note: See: (in Russian) Иннокентий (Фигуровский). Википедии. (Russian Wikipedia).)
- Repose of Elder Cosmas of Valaam and Riga (1968)
- Repose of Elder Anthimus of St. Anne's Skete, Mount Athos (1996)

== Icon gallery ==
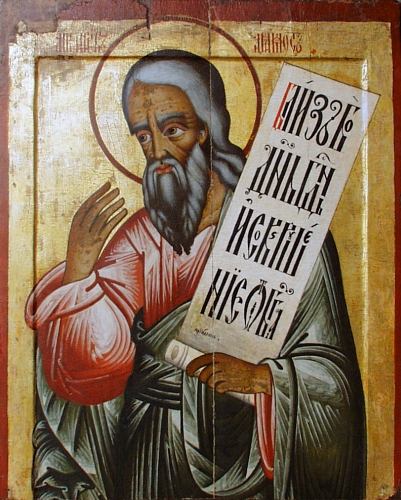
Prophet Amos.

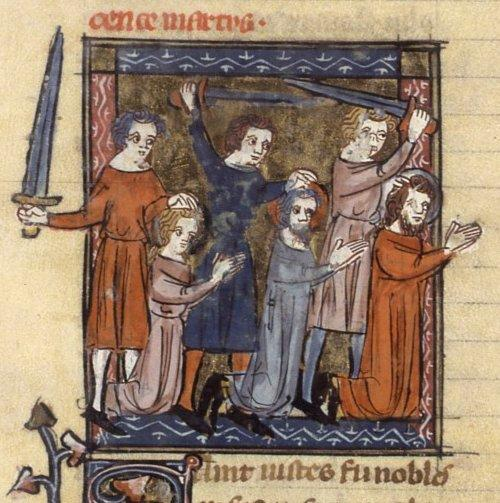
Martyrdom of Sts. Vitus, Modestus, and Crescentia.

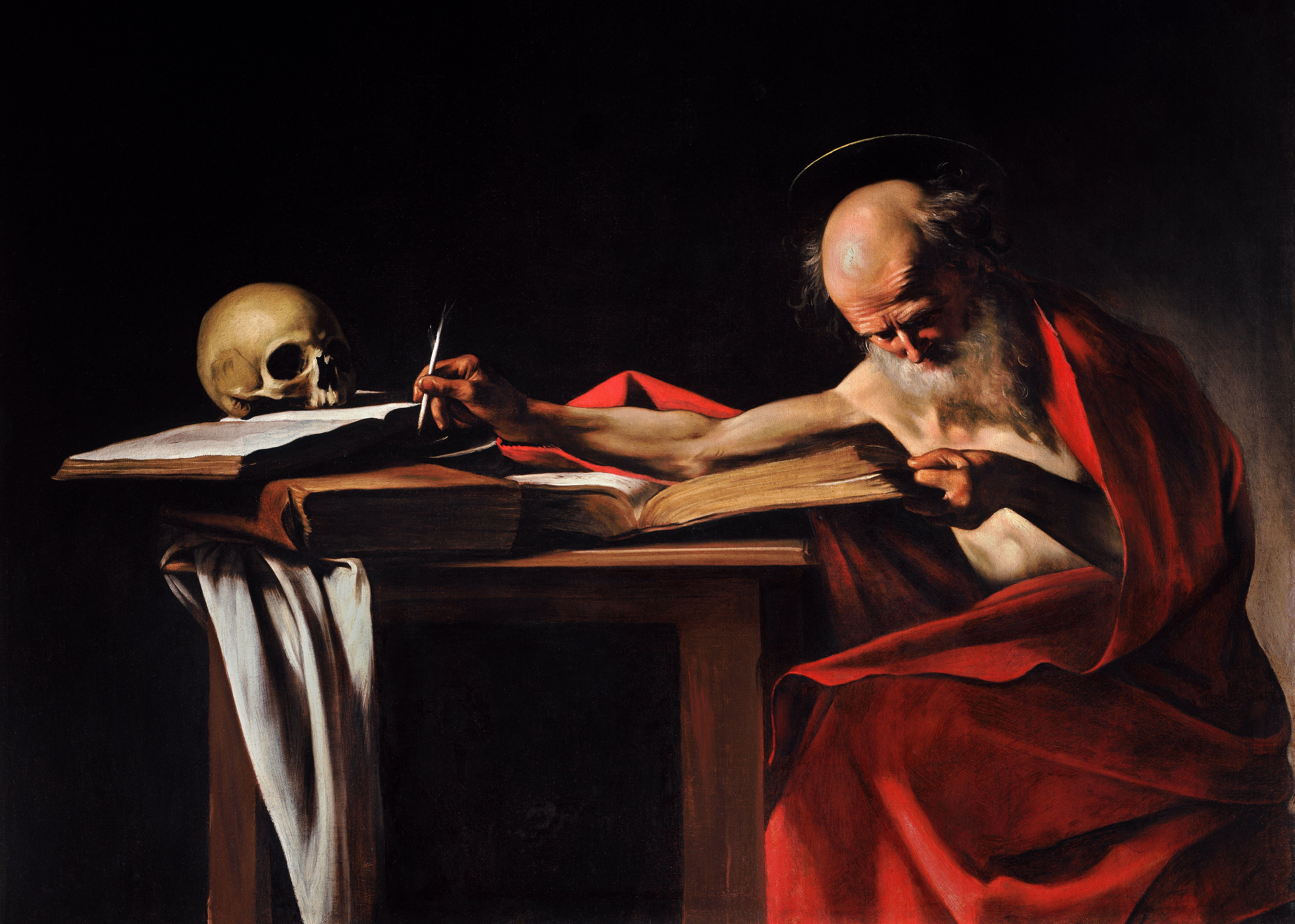
"Saint Jerome Writing" painting.

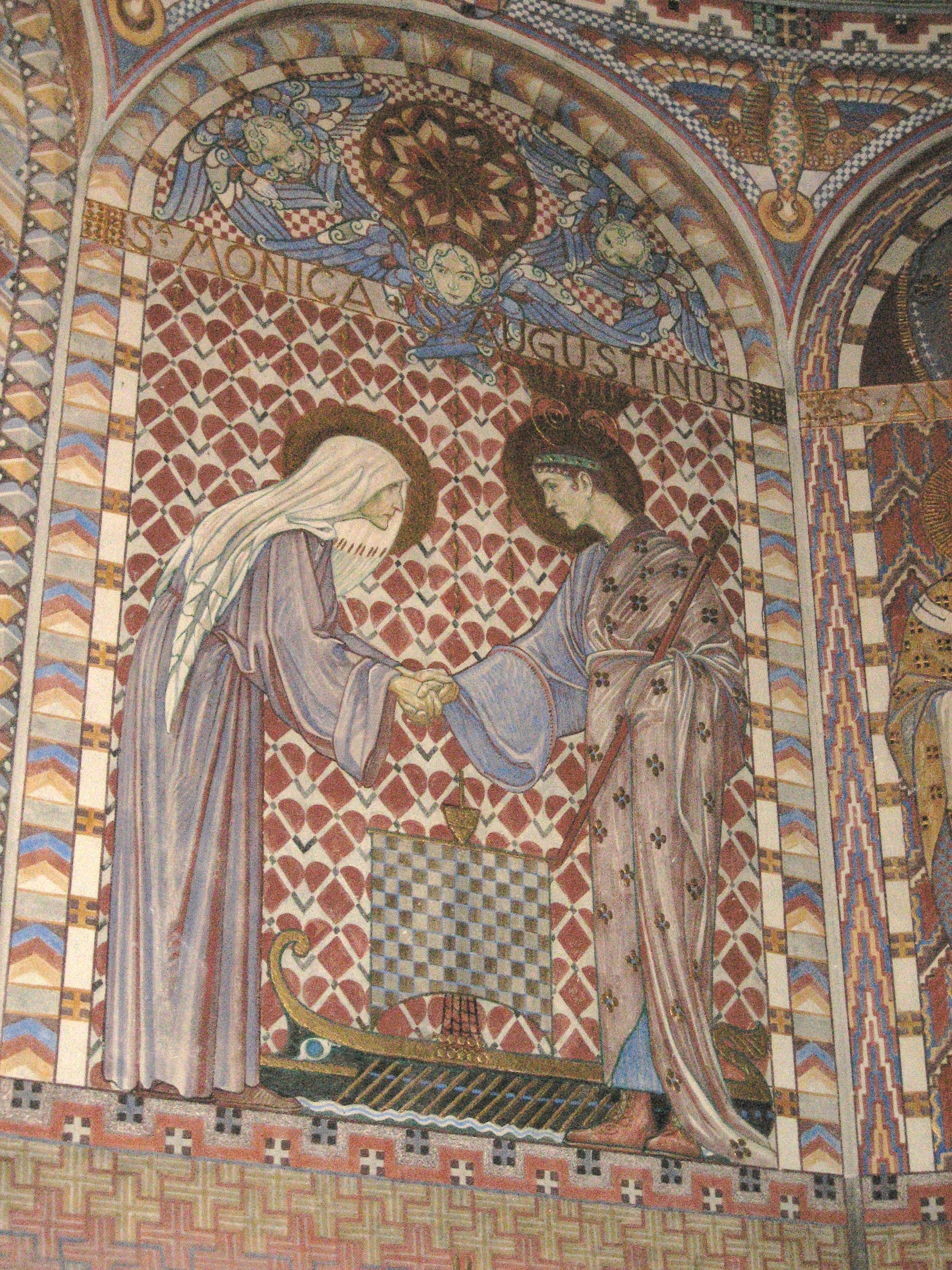
St. Augustine, Bishop of Hippo and his mother St. Monica of Tagaste.

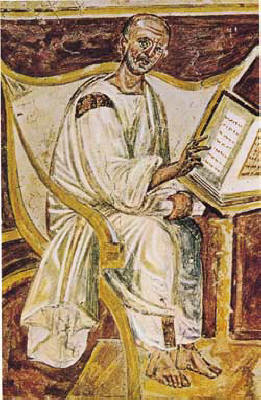
The earliest portrait of St. Augustine, Bishop of Hippo, in a 6th-century fresco, Lateran, Rome.

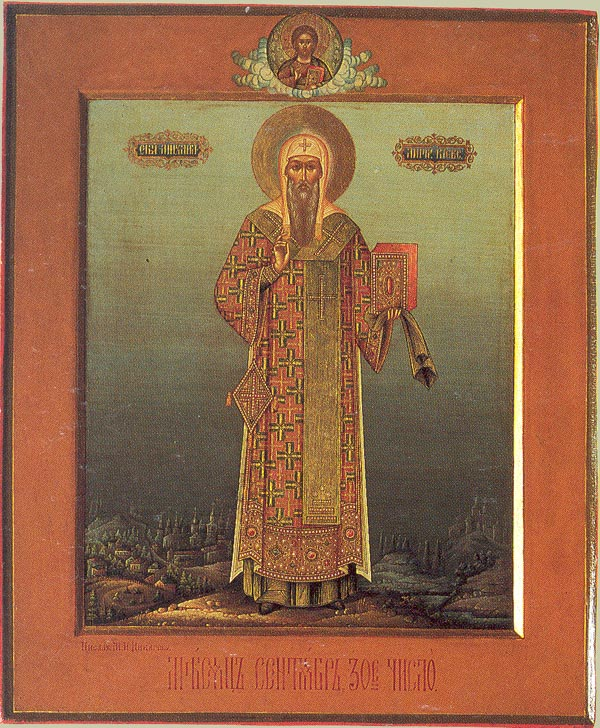
St. Michael I of Kiev, first Metropolitan of Kiev

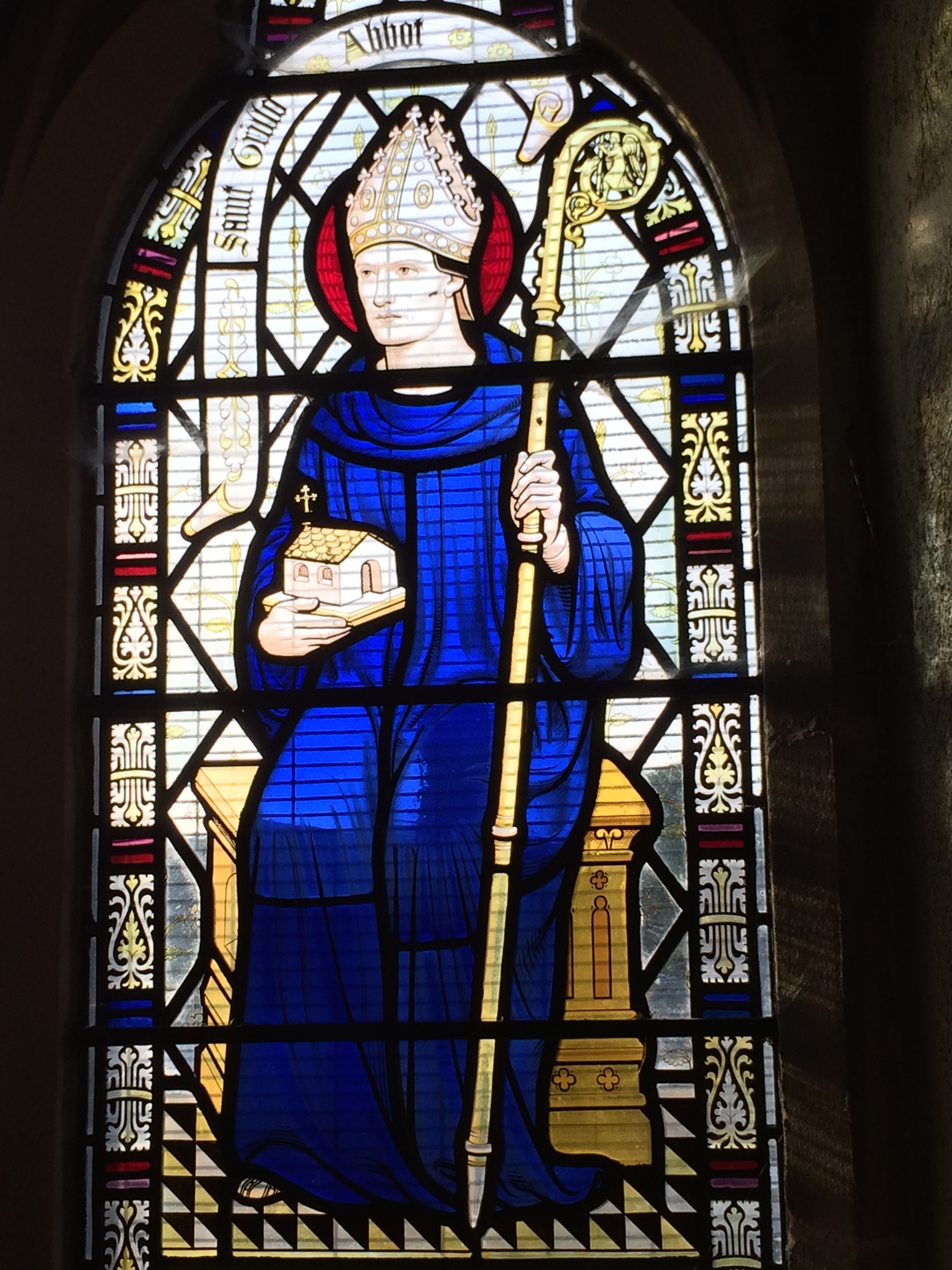
St. Trillo of Llandrillo.

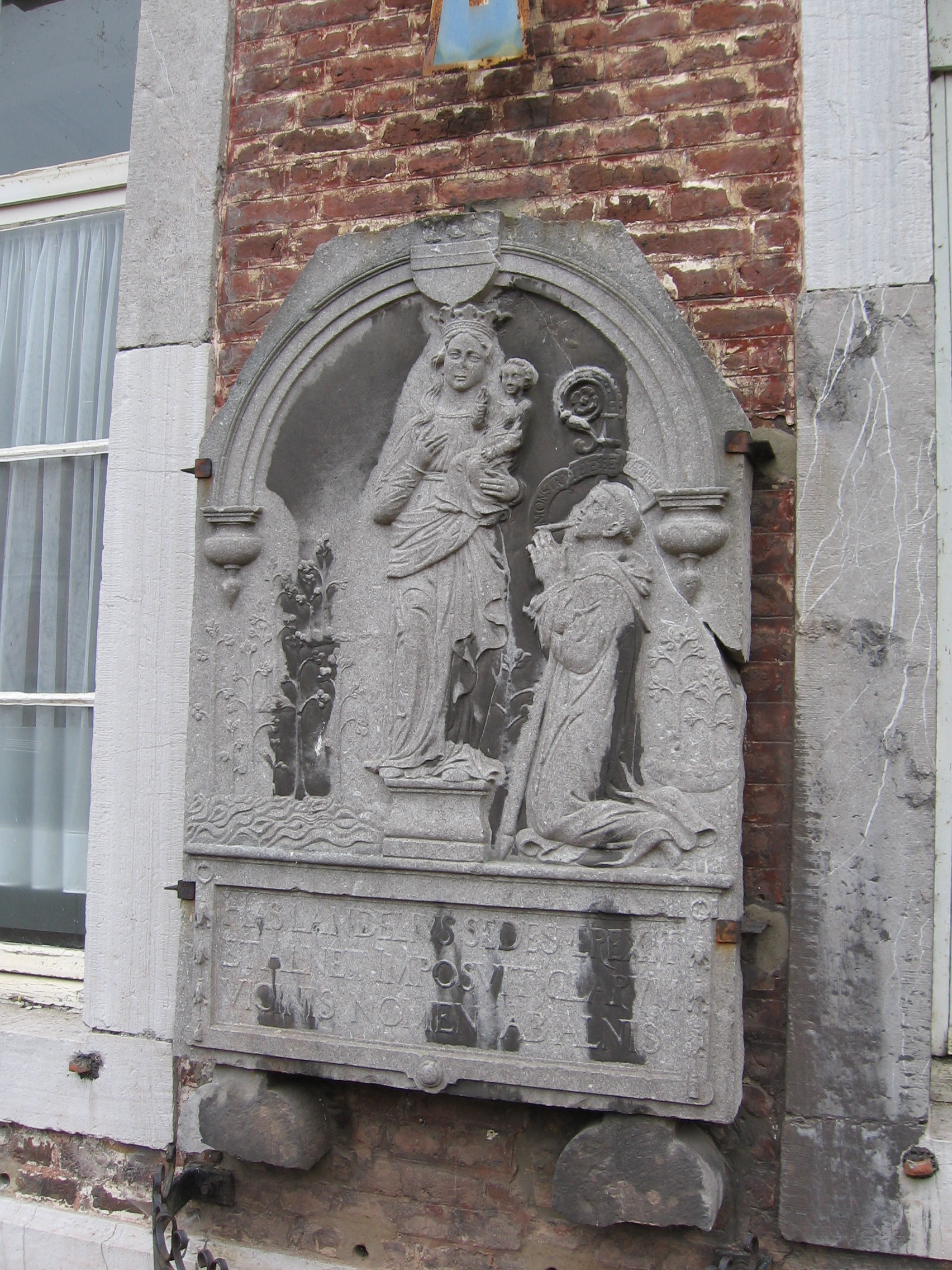
St. Landelinus.

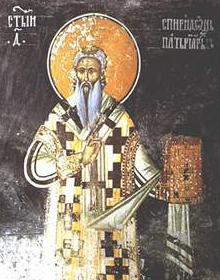
St. Spyridon, Serbian Patriarch.

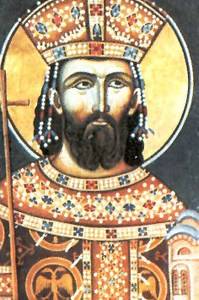
Great-martyr Tsar Lazar of Serbia.

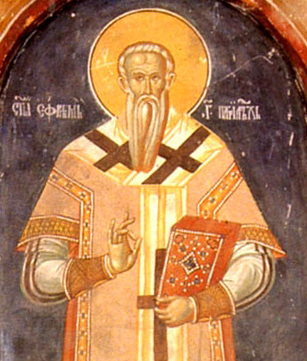
St. Ephraim, Serbian Patriarch.

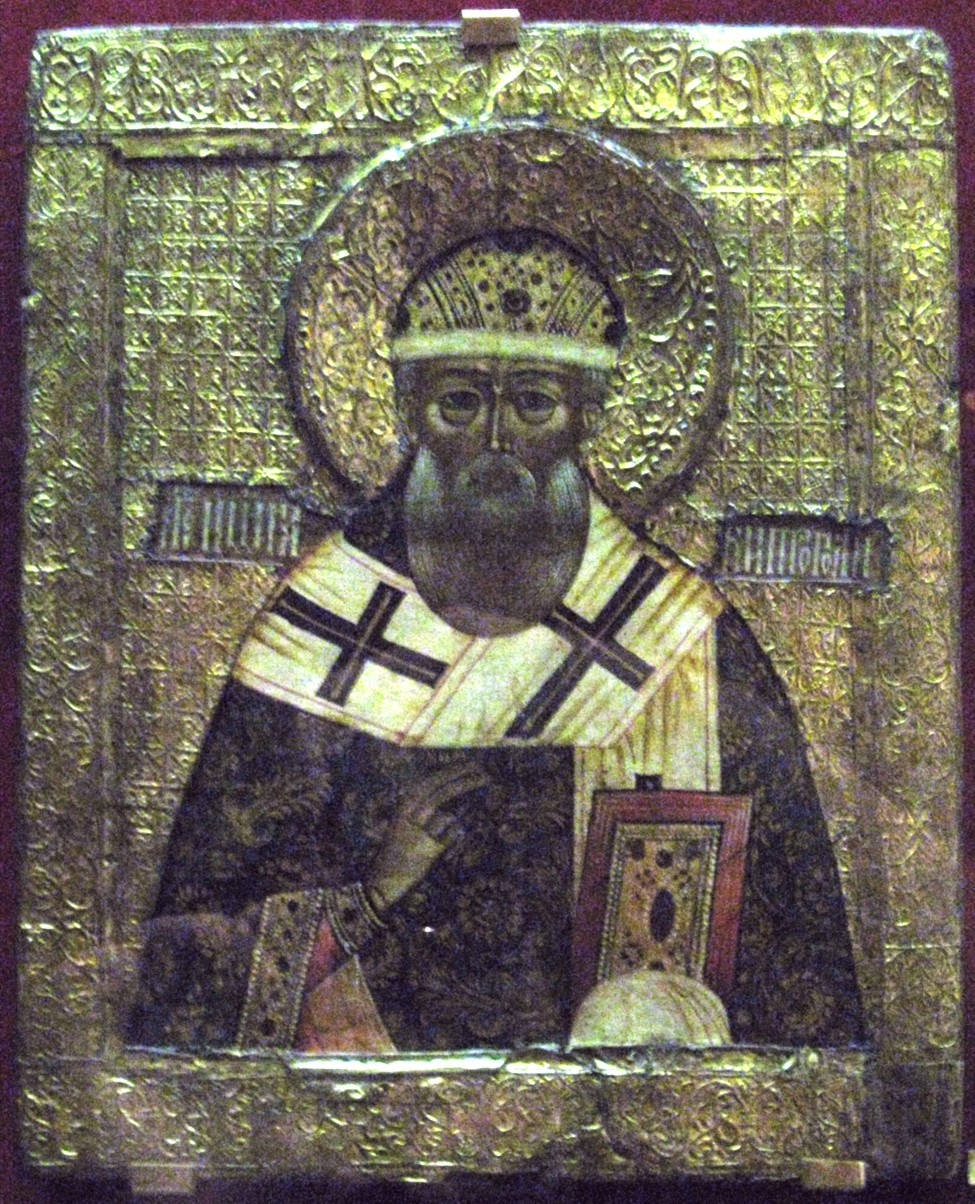
St. Jonah of Moscow, Metropolitan and Wonderworker of Kiev, Moscow, and all Russia.

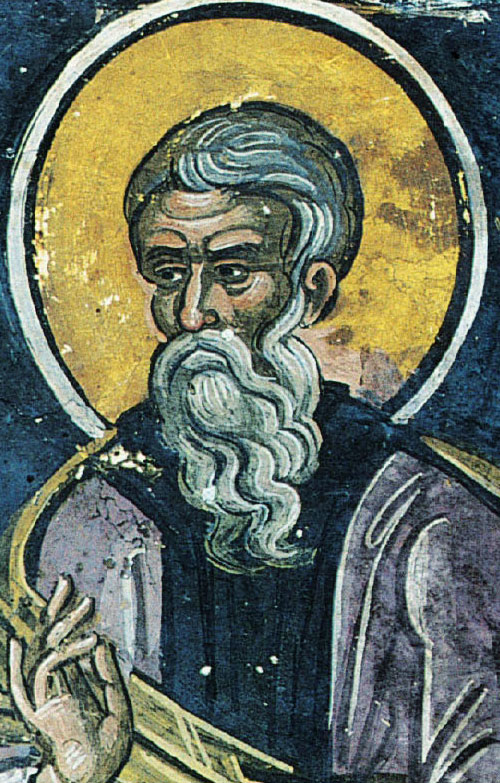
St. Theodore the Sykeote, Bishop of Anastasiopolis.

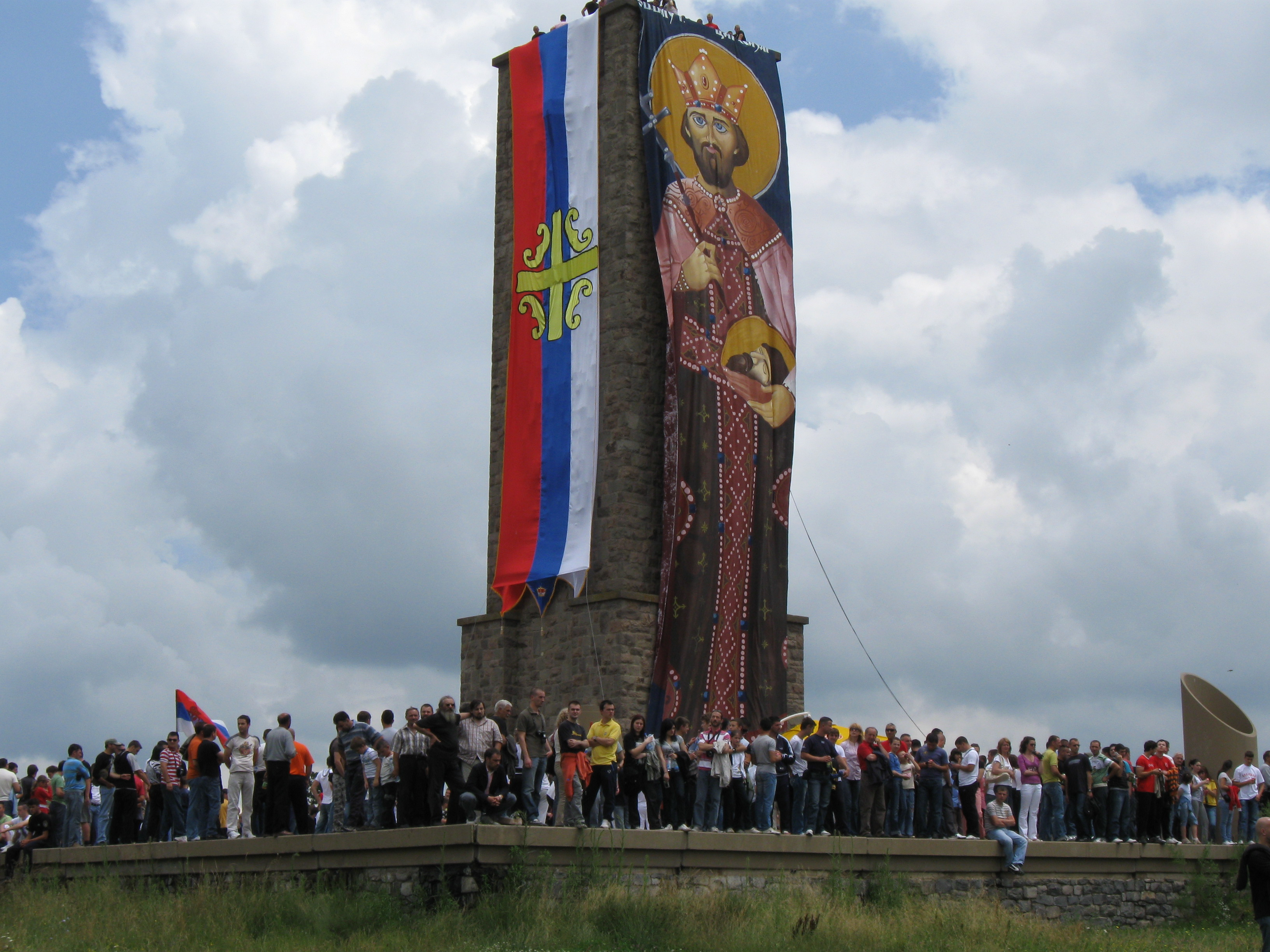
Celebration of Vidovdan (Synaxis of New Martyrs of the Serbia) at Gazimestan monument (2009).

== Sources ==
- June 15/28. Orthodox Calendar (PRAVOSLAVIE.RU).
- June 28 / June 15. HOLY TRINITY RUSSIAN ORTHODOX CHURCH (A parish of the Patriarchate of Moscow).
- June 15. OCA - The Lives of the Saints.
- The Autonomous Orthodox Metropolia of Western Europe and the Americas (ROCOR). St. Hilarion Calendar of Saints for the year of our Lord 2004. St. Hilarion Press (Austin, TX). p. 44.
- The Fifteenth Day of the Month of June. Orthodoxy in China.
- June 15. Latin Saints of the Orthodox Patriarchate of Rome.
- The Roman Martyrology. Transl. by the Archbishop of Baltimore. Last Edition, According to the Copy Printed at Rome in 1914. Revised Edition, with the Imprimatur of His Eminence Cardinal Gibbons. Baltimore: John Murphy Company, 1916. pp. 173–174.
- Rev. Richard Stanton. A Menology of England and Wales, or, Brief Memorials of the Ancient British and English Saints Arranged According to the Calendar, Together with the Martyrs of the 16th and 17th Centuries. London: Burns & Oates, 1892. pp. 269–271.

Greek Sources

- Great Synaxaristes: (in Greek) 15 ΙΟΥΝΙΟΥ. ΜΕΓΑΣ ΣΥΝΑΞΑΡΙΣΤΗΣ.
- (in Greek) Συναξαριστής. 15 Ιουνίου. ECCLESIA.GR. (H ΕΚΚΛΗΣΙΑ ΤΗΣ ΕΛΛΑΔΟΣ).
- (in Greek) 15 Ιουνίου. Αποστολική Διακονία της Εκκλησίας της Ελλάδος (Apostoliki Diakonia of the Church of Greece).
- (in Greek) 15/06/2017. Ορθόδοξος Συναξαριστής.

Russian Sources

- (in Russian) 28 июня (15 июня). Православная Энциклопедия под редакцией Патриарха Московского и всея Руси Кирилла (электронная версия). (Orthodox Encyclopedia - Pravenc.ru).
- (in Russian) 15 июня по старому стилю / 28 июня по новому стилю. Русская Православная Церковь - Православный церковный календарь на 2017 год.
- (in Russian) 15 июня (ст.ст.) 28 июня 2014 (нов. ст.). Русская Православная Церковь Отдел внешних церковных связей. (DECR).
