= Michael of Kiev =

Michael of Kiev may refer to:

- Mikhail of Vladimir, first grand prince of Kiev named Michael, reigned briefly in 1171
- Michael of Chernigov, 2nd grand prince of Kiev named Michael, reigned 1238–1239 & anew 1241–1246, executed by Mongols, glorified as a Saint
- Metropolitan Michael I of Kiev, First Metropolitan of Kiev (died 992)
