= List of protected heritage sites in Thuin =

This table shows an overview of the protected heritage sites in the Walloon town Thuin. This list is part of Belgium's national heritage.

Object	Year/architect	Town/section	Address	Coordinates	Number^{?}	Image
Thuin Belfry ^{(nl)} ^{(fr)}		Thuin	rue Albert Ier	50.339645°N 4.286605°E	56078-CLT-0001-01 Info	Belfort van Thuin
House "espagnole": facade ^{(nl)} ^{(fr)}		Thuin	Grand-Rue n°21	50.339016°N 4.288350°E	56078-CLT-0004-01 Info	Huis "espagnole": gevel
Cloister Chapel of the Grey Nuns ^{(nl)} ^{(fr)}		Thuin	Thuin	50.338835°N 4.291392°E	56078-CLT-0005-01 Info	
"Jardins suspendus"- hanging garders of Thuin ^{(nl)} ^{(fr)}		Thuin	Thuin	50.338295°N 4.290162°E	56078-CLT-0006-01 Info	"Jardins suspendus" van Thuin
Organs of the chapel of the Soeurs de Notre-Dame ^{(nl)} ^{(fr)}		Thuin		50.338911°N 4.291429°E	56078-CLT-0007-01 Info	
Organs of the church of Notre-Dame des Carmes ^{(nl)} ^{(fr)}		Thuin		50.338739°N 4.287856°E	56078-CLT-0008-01 Info	
Castle Leers-et-Fosteau and the facades and roofs of the outbuildings and the ensemble of the building and surrounding areas ^{(nl)} ^{(fr)}		Thuin		50.304867°N 4.252007°E	56078-CLT-0010-01 Info	kasteel van Leers-et-Fosteau en de gevels en daken van de bijgebouwen en het ensemble van het gebouw en de omliggende terreinen
Woodland Church of Gozée ^{(nl)} ^{(fr)}		Thuin		50.352106°N 4.370620°E	56078-CLT-0012-01 Info	
Various woods, meadows and a pond near the abbey farm Aulne ^{(nl)} ^{(fr)}		Thuin		50.362354°N 4.332106°E	56078-CLT-0013-01 Info	Verschillende bossen, weilanden en een vijver in de buurt van de abdij-hoeve van Aulne
Land near the abbey farm Aulne ^{(nl)} ^{(fr)}		Thuin		50.360482°N 4.336369°E	56078-CLT-0014-01 Info	
St. Martin's Church ^{(nl)} ^{(fr)}		Thuin	Ragnies	50.308314°N 4.284191°E	56078-CLT-0015-01 Info	Kerk Saint-Martin
Chapel of Ossogne and environment ^{(nl)} ^{(fr)}		Thuin		50.291162°N 4.342670°E	56078-CLT-0016-01 Info	
Total parsonage Ragnies ^{(nl)} ^{(fr)}		Thuin		50.308679°N 4.283698°E	56078-CLT-0017-01 Info	
Galleries at the foot of the belfry ^{(nl)} ^{(fr)}		Thuin	place du Chapitre	50.339728°N 4.286694°E	56078-CLT-0018-01 Info	Galerijen aan de voet van het belfort
Church of Notre-Dame d'el Vaux, retaining wall, sidewalk along the southern facade of the church, cobbled alleyways, stairway under the arch of the choir and the ensemble formed by the building, sidewalks, alleys and square du Moustier (old cemetery) ^{(nl)} ^{(fr)}		Thuin		50.341148°N 4.281764°E	56078-CLT-0019-01 Info	
Ensemble formed by the buildings on Grand-Rue n ° s 36 and 38, and the park "Refuge d'Aulne" (now park of the town hall) ^{(nl)} ^{(fr)}		Thuin	Grand-Rue n°s 36 et 38	50.339509°N 4.288421°E	56078-CLT-0020-01 Info	
Mill Biesmelle ^{(nl)} ^{(fr)}		Thuin	rue des Compères	50.297606°N 4.331766°E	56078-CLT-0021-01 Info	
House facades and roofs, except under a glass roof of the beginning of the century) and the house adjacent to the courtyard on the west ^{(nl)} ^{(fr)}		Thuin	place Albert Ier n°13	50.339407°N 4.286435°E	56078-CLT-0022-01 Info	
Menhir called "Le Zeupire", near Route de Beaumont. Setting conservation. ^{(nl)} ^{(fr)}		Thuin	Gozée	50.329192°N 4.348334°E	56078-CLT-0023-01 Info	Menhir genaamd "Le Zeupire", nabij route de Beaumont. Instelling beschermingszone.
The two remaining arches of the bridge over the Moines river called the Sambre downstream of the old abbey of Aulne, and on the right bank of this stream, rue de Leernes 13 (with the exception of the house built on the platform that can be accessed via the bridge and the masonry around the arches) ^{(nl)} ^{(fr)}		Thuin	rue de Leernes 13	50.366595°N 4.336379°E	56078-CLT-0024-01 Info	
Forest of Grand Bon Dieu ^{(nl)} ^{(fr)}		Thuin		50.331714°N 4.286486°E	56078-CLT-0025-01 Info	
Certain parts of the Aulne Abbey, with the abbey farm and the ensemble of the abbey and surrounding areas ^{(nl)} ^{(fr)}		Thuin		50.365738°N 4.331394°E	56078-CLT-0026-01 Info	Bepaalde delen van de abdij van Aulne, met de abdij-hoeve en het ensemble van de abdij en de omliggende terreinen More images
Farmhouse Grande Couture and its environment ^{(nl)} ^{(fr)}		Thuin		50.295825°N 4.325184°E	56078-CLT-0028-01 Info	
Zone around the forest "Bois du Prince" ^{(nl)} ^{(fr)}		Thuin		50.366646°N 4.340587°E	56078-CLT-0029-01 Info	
Thuin Belfry ^{(nl)} ^{(fr)}		Thuin		50.339645°N 4.286605°E	56078-PEX-0001-01 Info	Belfort van Thuin
"Jardins suspendus" of Thuin ^{(nl)} ^{(fr)}		Thuin	Thuin	50.338295°N 4.290162°E	56078-PEX-0002-01 Info	"Jardins suspendus" van Thuin
Site of the Aulne Abbey and surrounding areas including the farm ^{(nl)} ^{(fr)}		Thuin		50.364186°N 4.332111°E	56078-PEX-0003-01 Info	Site van de abdij van Aulne en de omliggende terreinen met inbegrip van de hoeve

== See also ==
- List of protected heritage sites in Hainaut (province)
- Thuin
