= Metropolitan Michael I of Kiev =

Saint Michael I of Kiev and all Rus'
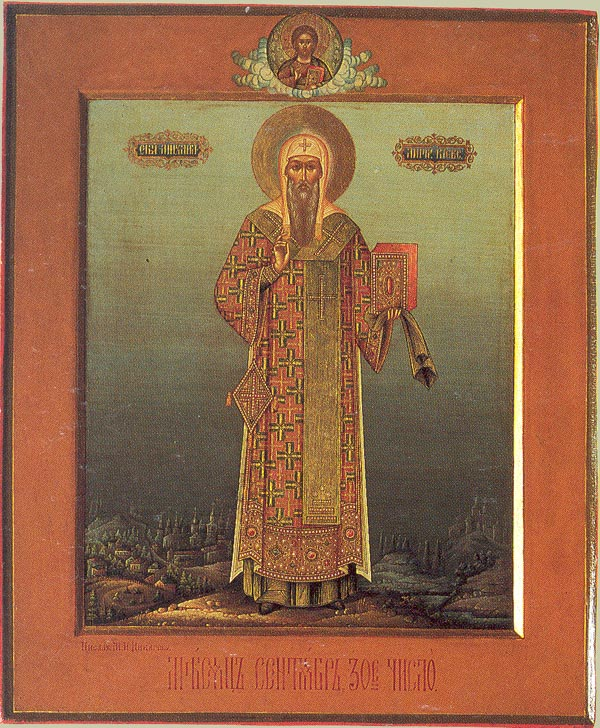
- Russian icon of St. Michael I

Metropolitan of Kiev and all Rus', Venerable
- Residence: Kiev
- Died: June 15, 992; Kiev
- Honored in: Eastern Orthodox Church
- Canonized: 18th century, Kiev by The Most Holy Governing Synod
- Major shrine: Kiev Monastery of the Caves
- Feast: 15 June; 30 September

Metropolitan Michael I of Kiev (Russian: Святитель Михаил Киевский и всея Руси, митрополит; Ukrainian: Митрополит Михаїл Київський; died 15 June 992) is considered to be the first Metropolitan of Kiev and all Rus' from 988 until his death. He was canonised as a saint by the Russian Orthodox Church, being commemorated with a feast day on 15 June and 30 September.

== Biography ==
Different historical accounts state that he was either Assyrian or Bulgarian. He is traditionally accounted as founding the St. Michael's Golden-Domed Monastery in Kiev as well as the Mezhyhirskyi Monastery near Vyshhorod with Greek monks in 988.

== Veneration and relics ==
His relics were originally located in the Church of the Tithes, then they were moved to the Near Caves of the Kiev Pechersk Lavra, and are now located in the Dormition Cathedral of the lavra.

Michael's feast day is observed on June 15 (death day), September 30 (translation of relics), and formerly (with Anthony of Kiev and Theodosius of Kiev) on September 2.

Preceded by unknown	Metropolitan of Kiev and All-Rus'; 988–992	Succeeded by Leontiy of Kiev
