= Beaulieu-en-Argonne =

- Commune
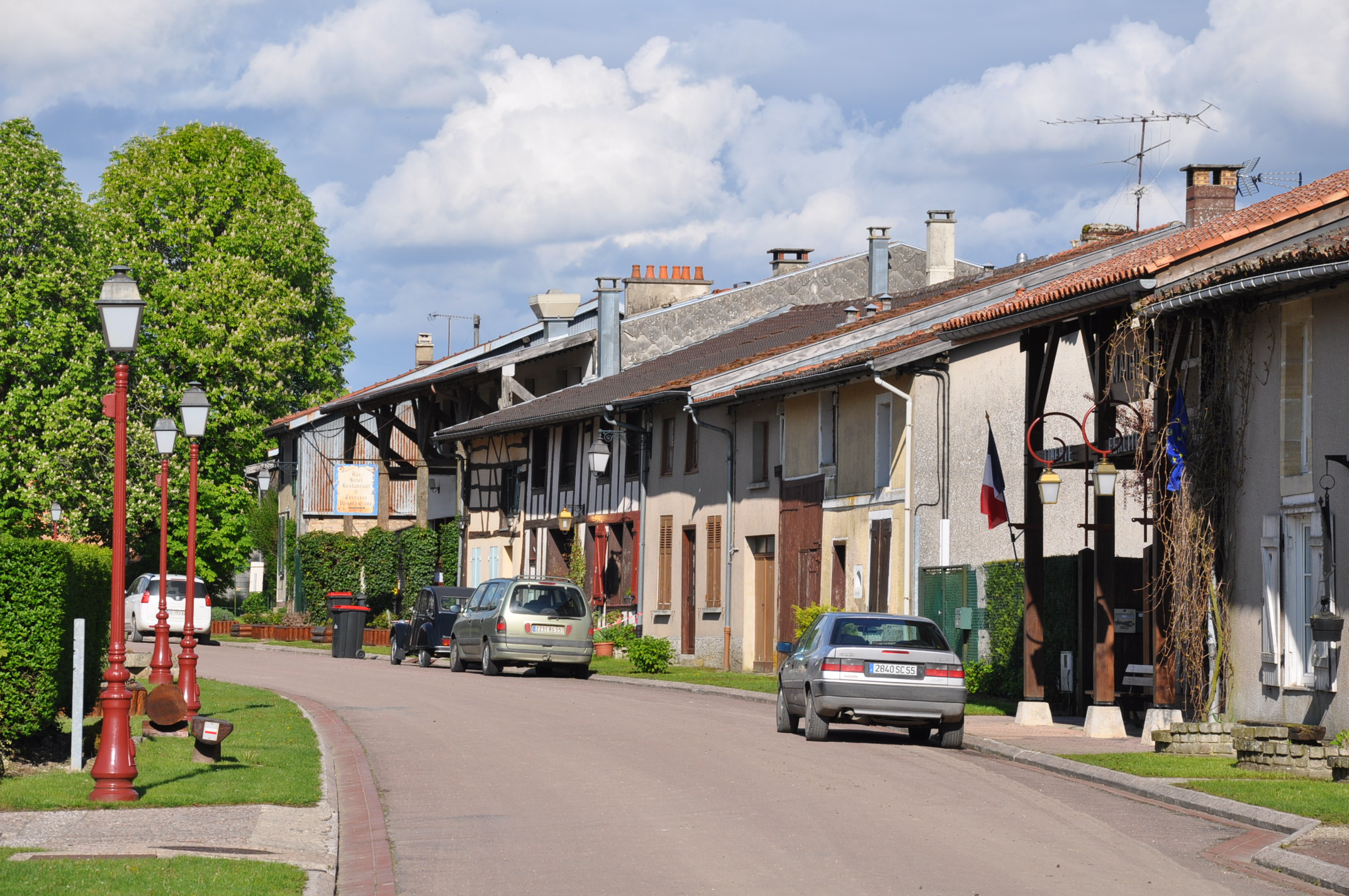
- The main road in Beaulieu-en-Argonne

- Coat of arms
- Location of Beaulieu-en-Argonne
- Location within France Location within Grand Est
- Coordinates: 49°01′57″N 5°04′04″E
- Country: France
- Region: Grand Est
- Department: Meuse
- Arrondissement: Bar-le-Duc
- Canton: Dieue-sur-Meuse
- Intercommunality: CC de l'Aire à l'Argonne

Government
  - Mayor (2021–2026): Maurice Locardel
- Area^{1}: 29.56 km^{2} (11.41 sq mi)
- Elevation: 276 m (906 ft)
- Highest elevation: 301 m (988 ft)
- Lowest elevation: 146 m (479 ft)
- Population (2023): 37
  - Density: 1.3/km^{2} (3.2/sq mi)
- Time zone: UTC+01:00 (CET)
  - Summer (DST): UTC+02:00 (CEST)
- INSEE/Postal code: 55038 /55250
- ^{1} French Land Register data, which excludes lakes, ponds, glaciers > 1 km^{2} (0.386 sq mi or 247 acres) and river estuaries.

Beaulieu-en-Argonne (French pronunciation: [boljø ɑ̃.n‿aʁɡɔn], literally Beaulieu in Argonne) is a commune in the Meuse department in the Grand Est region in northeastern France.

The Abbey of Beaulieu was founded and governed for thirty years by Saint Rodingus (died c. 680), an Irish monk.

== Population ==
Historical population
Year	Pop.	±% p.a.
1968	81	—
1975	45	−8.05%
1982	46	+0.31%
1990	42	−1.13%
1999	30	−3.67%
2007	33	+1.20%
2012	38	+2.86%
2017	36	−1.08%
2023	37	+0.46%
Source: INSEE

== See also ==
- Communes of the Meuse department
