= Crespin Abbey =

Benedictine monastery in Crespin, Nord, France

Coordinates: 50.2519°N 3.3943°E

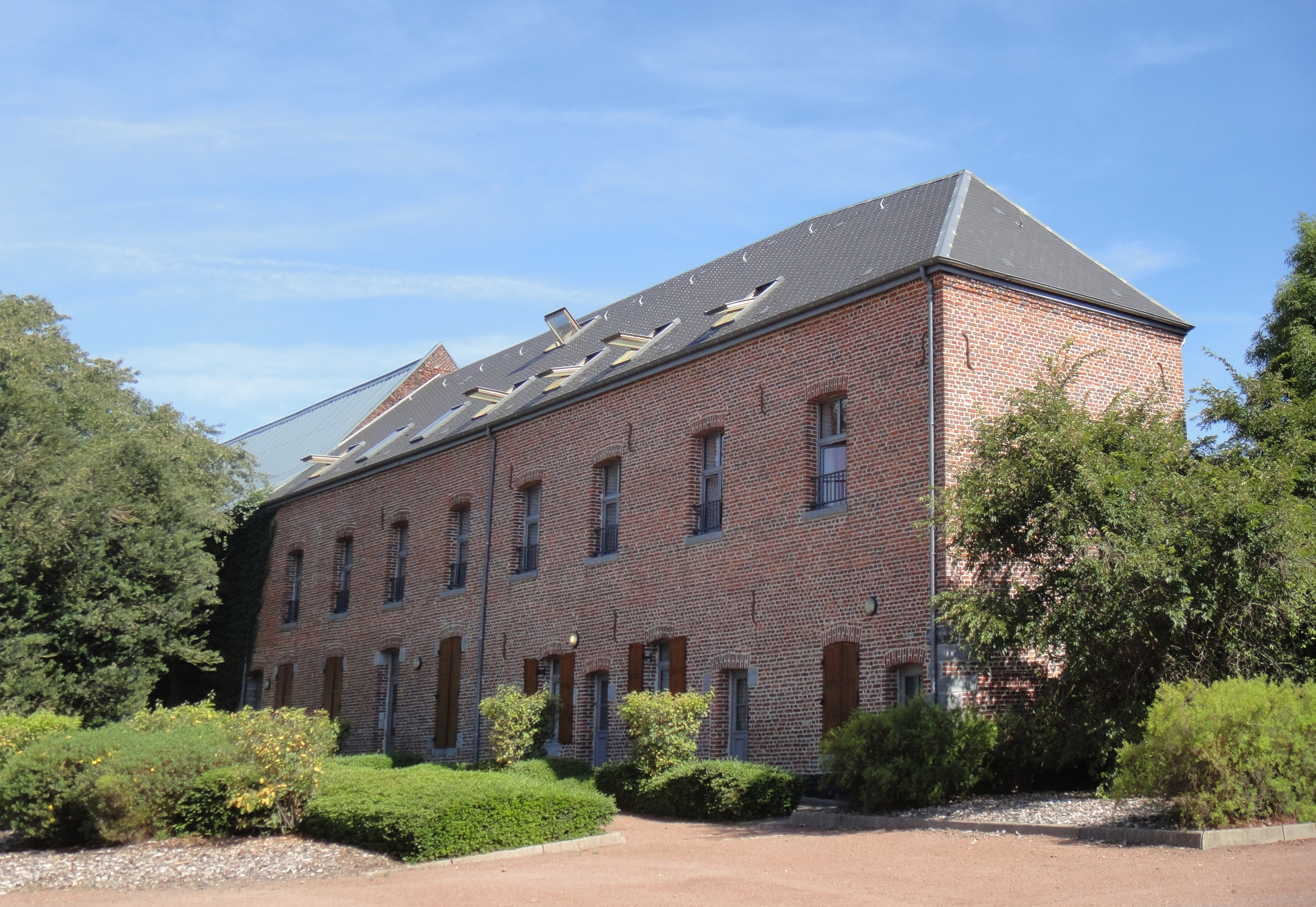
Crespin Abbaye

Crespin Abbey (French: Abbaye de Crespin) was a Benedictine monastery in the commune of Crespin in the department of Nord, France, founded around 648 by the reformed brigand Landelin of Crespin, also the first abbot, and dissolved in 1802.

== Foundation ==
Landelin was born of a noble family, but became the leader of a band of brigands. After his conversion to Christianity he became active as a missionary in the north of France. The traditional story is that he then withdrew with two disciples into the forest of the County of Hainault between Valenciennes and Mons, where he built a wooden cell on the bank of the Haine, which flows into the Scheldt at Condé-sur-l'Escaut. The owner of the forest took their clothes in compensation for the branches they had sawn off without his permission, and was struck lame: only when he returned the clothes did Landelin heal him. It is also said that after praying Landelin struck the ground with his staff, whereupon a strong spring appeared, the curling waves of which (Latin: crispantibus undis) caused him to name the spot "Crispinium" (Crespin). The reputation of the three hermits and the stories of these miracles attracted increasing numbers of disciples, for whom Landelin had a chapel built, which became the centre of the Benedictine abbey, dedicated to Saint Peter. Landelin was its first abbot. He died there, probably in 686, and was buried in the abbey church.

From Crespin, Landelin founded Aulne Abbey on the banks of the Sambre in 656. He is also credited with founding Lobbes Abbey in about 650, and the priory at Wallers-Trélon (now Wallers-en-Fagne) in 657.

== History ==
The monastery flourished at first, because of its reputation for miracles at the intercession of Landelin, but in the 9th century found itself in increasing danger of being plundered or destroyed by the marauding Vikings. Landelin's relics were therefore moved, apparently in 836, to Boke in Delbrück near Paderborn. (Note: From Boke they were moved in 1104 to Flechtdorf Abbey near Korbach in northern Hesse.) In 870 the abbey was indeed destroyed by the Vikings. Although it was quickly rebuilt, it was not immediately re-dedicated as a monastery, but housed a community of secular priests, and was not re-occupied by the Benedictines until 1080. In 1095 Sigard of Chocques donated a mill and some land near Angre to the Abbey for the soul of William the Conqueror.

From 1080 to 1802, when the abbey was dissolved in the Napoleonic period, there were altogether 48 abbots of Crespin. After its dissolution the abbey was sold off and destroyed.

== Present day ==
Of the abbey church, first built in 673, only a few ruins remain. Of the other structures on the site only the abbot's house still stands, with a few ancillary buildings.

== Sources ==
- Helvétius, Anne-Marie, 1986: L'abbaye de Crespin des origines au milieu du XIIIe siècle. Université libre de Bruxelles: Brussels.
- Helvétius, Anne-Marie, 1988: "Les sainteurs de l'abbaye de Crespin, du Xe au XIIIe siècle", in Revue belge de philologie et d'histoire, vol. LXVI.
- Tönsmeyer, Hans D, 1986: Der heilige Landelin von Crespin. 836-1986. Festschrift zur Feier der 1150-jährigen Wiederkehr der Übertragung seiner Reliquien nach Boke. Pamphlet. ISBN 3980031357, ISBN 978-3980031356.
- Trelcat, Émile, 1923: Histoire de l'abbaye de Crespin, Ordre de Saint Benoît. Arthur Savaète: Paris. OCLC 80818219
