= Rodingus =

French saint (born c. 595)

Saint Rodingus
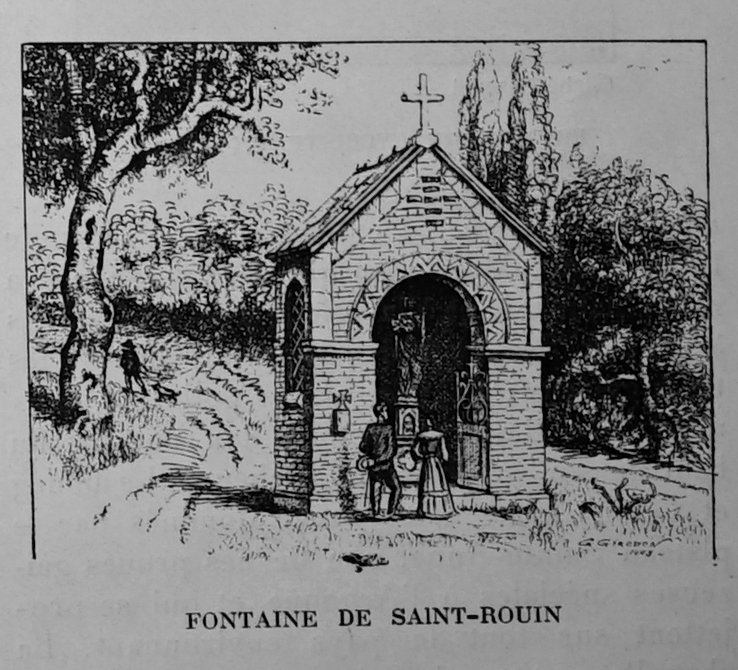
- Fontaine Saint Rouin
- Born: c. 595; Ireland
- Residence: Beaulieu Abbey, Argonne
- Died: c. 680
- Venerated in: Beaulieu-en-Argonne
- Canonized: Pre-congregation
- Feast: 17 September

Saint Rodingus (or Radingus, Ronin, Rouin; died c. 680) was an Irish monk and abbot in Beaulieu-en-Argonne, France. His feast day is 17 September.

== Monks of Ramsgate account ==
The monks of St Augustine's Abbey, Ramsgate wrote in their Book of Saints (1921),

Ronin (Radingus) (St.) Abbot (Sept. 17) (7th cent.) An Irish Saint, Founder of the Abbey of Beaulieu in Argonne, which he governed for thirty years. He retired to a hermitage to prepare for death, and passed away A.D. 680. There are several Saints, locally venerated in the British Isles and in France and Belgium, of the same or similar name. The distinguishing them, the one from the other, is often very difficult.

== Butler's account ==
The hagiographer Alban Butler (1710–1773) wrote in his Lives of the Fathers, Martyrs, and Other Principal Saints under September 17,

St. Rouin, in Latin Rodingus, and Chrodingus, First Abbot of Beaulieu, in Argonne.

HE was a native of Ireland, where he embraced the monastic state, and received priesthood. Having afterwards left his own country, he retired to the monastery of Tholey, in the diocess of Treves, and became a perfect model of all virtues to the monks, who, according to some writers, elected him their superior. Here he was so often interrupted by the visits of those who came from all parts to consult him, that he quitted the monastery and retired to Verdun, to be near Paul, the holy bishop of that city, where he spent two years. After this, he resolved to settle in the forest of Argonne; but being refused permission by the person to whom it belonged, he went to Rome with his disciples. Upon his return to France he obtained the consent he wished for, and taking up his residence in the forest, he there laid the foundation of the abbey of Beaulieu, which still subsists and is dependant on the congregation of St. Vannes.

The church was dedicated under the invocation of St. Maurice and his companions; and the new community soon became very numerous. The holy founder was honoured with the protection of King Clovis II. and his queen, St. Bathildes; and was also greatly esteemed by Childeric, king of Austrasia, who confirmed the new establishment by his diploma, and endowed it with land. The saint having governed his monastery thirty years, called for a successor, and retired into a solitary place in the neighbourhood, out of which he never went, except on Sundays, or when his presence was necessary in the community. He died on the 17th of September, about the year 680, at the age of eighty-six, and was buried in the church of his abbey. He is mentioned in the Gallican and Benedictin Martyrologies. See D. Menard, l. 2, Observ. in Mart. Ben. et addit. and Mabillon addit. sec. 4, Ben.

== Sources ==
- Butler, Alban (1866), The Lives of the Fathers, Martyrs, and Other Principal Saints, vol. 9, James Duffy This article incorporates text from this source, which is in the public domain.
- St. Augustine's Abbey, Ramsgate (1921), The Book of saints : a dictionary of servants of God canonized by the Catholic Church, London: A. & C. Black, ltd. This article incorporates text from this source, which is in the public domain.
