= September 30 (Eastern Orthodox liturgics) =

Day in the Eastern Orthodox liturgical calendar

Eastern Orthodox liturgical calendar
| September 29 | September 30 | October 1 |
September 30 O.S. ≍ October 13 N.S. September 30 N.S ≍ September 17 O.S.

An Eastern Orthodox cross

September 30 in Eastern Orthodox liturgical calendars is a feast day and a day of commemoration of saints and martyrs. Although some Orthodox churches use the Revised Julian Calendar and others use the traditional Julian calendar, the fixed commemorations for their respective September 30 are broadly the same, no matter which calendar is used. (Note: Despite the dates being the same, the days to which they refer typically differ by 13 days. The notation Old Style or O.S. is sometimes used to indicate a date in the traditional Julian Calendar (the "Old Calendar"). The notation New Style or N.S. indicates a date in the Revised Julian calendar (the "New Calendar").)

== Saints ==
- Hieromartyr Gregory the Illuminator, Bishop and Enlightener of Greater Armenia (c. 335)
- Martyrs Rhipsima and Gaiana with 35 Virgin-Martyrs, in Armenia (early 4th century)
- Holy seventy (70) martyrs, with St. Rhipsima (4th century)
- Holy 1000 martyrs, by the sword.
- Martyr Stratonicus, by the sword.
- Martyr Mardonius, by burning out his eyes. (Note: There is also a martyr named Mardonius commemorated on December 28. It is not impossible that they are the same individual.)

== Pre-Schism Western saints ==
- Martyr Sophia, mother of the virgin-martyrs Faith, Hope and Charity, at Rome (c. 173) (Note: The mother of the virgin-martyrs Faith, Hope and Charity who were martyred in Rome under Hadrian. Three days later, while praying at their tomb, Sophia also reposed, martyred in her soul.) (see also: September 17 - East)
- Martyrs Victor and Ursus, two soldiers connected with the Theban Legion and venerated in Soleure in Switzerland (286) (Note: "At Soleure, in Switzerland, in the time of the emperor Maximian, the passion of the holy martyrs Victor and Ursus, of the glorius Theban legion, who were subjected to horrid tortures; but a heavenly light shining over them, and causing the executioners to fall to the ground, they were delivered. Being then cast into the fire without sustaining any injury, they finally perished by the sword.") (Note: SAINTS VICTOR and Ursus were, according to S. Eucherius of Lyons, two Christian soldiers belonging to the Theban legion, cohorts or maniples of which were scattered along the German frontier. They were called on to sacrifice, and when they refused they were beheaded at Soleure, of which city they are now regarded as the patrons. As they were dying a sudden dazzling sunbeam is said to have fallen on and glorified the martyrs.")
- Saint Antoninus, a soldier of the Theban Legion, martyred on the banks of the Trebbia near Piacenza in Italy (3rd century) (Note: His blood, kept in a phial, has the same miraculous properties as that of St Januarius.)
- Saint Leopardus, a servant or slave in the household of Julian the Apostate, likely martyred in Rome (362) (Note: "The same day, the holy martyr Leopardus, of the household of Julian the Apostate. He was beheaded at Rome, and his body was subsequently taken to Aix-la-Chapelle.")
- Blessed Jerome (Hieronymus) of Stridonium (420) (Note: Eusebius Hieronymus Sophronius was born at Stridon in Dalmatia. He studied in Rome, travelled in Italy and Gaul, lived as a hermit in Palestine and then returned to Rome where he was ordained. He finally went back to Palestine and settled in Bethlehem. He spent the rest of his life translating and commenting on the Bible. The Orthodox Church accords him the title of Blessed.) (Note: "IN Bethlehem of Juda, the decease of St. Jerome, priest and Doctor of the Church, who, excelling in all kinds of learning, imitated the life of the most approved monks, and disposed of many monstrous heresies with the sword of his doctrine. Having at length reached a very advanced age, he rested in peace, and was buried near the manger of our Lord. His body was afterwards conveyed to Rome, and deposited in the basilica of St. Mary the Greater.") (see also: June 15 - East)
- Saint Midan (Nidan), a saint on Anglesey in Wales (c. 610)
- Saint Honorius, Archbishop of Canterbury, Confessor (653) (Note: Born in Rome, he succeeded St Justus as fifth Archbishop of Canterbury in England (627). He was consecrated bishop at Lincoln by St Paulinus and himself consecrated St Felix for East Anglia and St Ithamar, the first English bishop, for Rochester.) (Note: "Honorius was a disciple of S. Gregory the Great, and was sent by him to Britain along with S. Augustine. He succeeded S. Justus in the see of Canterbury. He is said by some to have been ordained by S. Paulinus of York, at Lincoln, and Honorius I. the Pope, sent him the pall in A.D. 634. When King Edwin fell in the battle of Hatfield (11th October, 633), and Northumbria was ravaged by the ferocious Cadwallon, who sought, as Bede says, to extirpate from the soil of Britain the English race, S. Paulinus fled by sea, taking with him the gentle Ethelburga, the widow of King Edwin, with the daughter and the two youngest sons whom she had borne to Edwin. He placed them in safety with her brother, the King of Kent, and then was invested with the bishopric of Rochester by the King and Archbishop Honorius.")
- Saint Enghenedl, a church in Anglesey in Wales was dedicated to him (7th century)
- Saint Laurus (Lery), born in Wales, he went to Brittany and founded the monastery later called after him, Saint-Léry, on the River Doneff (7th century)
- Martyr-hermits Tancred, Torthred, and Tova, three Anglo-Saxon siblings of Thorney. (Note: Two hermits and an anchoress martyred by the Danes at Thorney in England.)

== Post-Schism Orthodox saints ==
- Saint Michael, Great Prince of Tver (1318)
- Venerable Gregory, founder of Pelshma Monastery in Vologda, Wonderworker (1442) (Note: See: (in Russian) Григорий Пельшемский. Википедии. (Russian Wikipedia).)
- Saint Meletius I Pegas, Patriarch of Alexandria (1601) (Note: "St Meletiy has been formally included in the list of All Saints of Galicia for his activity on behalf of Ukrainian Orthodox, especially for his support of the Orthodox at the time of the Union of Brest.": See: (in Russian) Собор Галицких святых. Википедии. (Russian Wikipedia).) (see also: September 13 - Greek)

=== New martyrs and confessors ===
- New Hieromartyr Prokopius Popov, Priest (1918)
- New Hieromartyrs (1937):

- Peter Solovyov, Viacheslav (Wenceslaus) Zankov, Peter Pushkinsky, Symeon Lileev, Basil Guriev, Alexander Orlov, (Note: See: (in Russian) Орлов, Александр Васильевич (1885—1937). Википедии. (Russian Wikipedia).) Priests;
- Seraphim Vasilenko, Deacon;
- Virgin-martyr Alexandra (Chervyakova), Schemanun, of Moscow (1937)
- Martyrs Alexis Serebrennikov and Matthew Solovyov;
- Virgin-martyr Apollinaria Tupitsyna.

- New Hieromartyr Leonidas Prendkovich, Priest (1938)
- New Hiero-confessor Seraphim (Zagorovsky), Hieromonk, of Kharkov (1943) (Note: See: (in Russian) Серафим (Загоровский). Википедии. (Russian Wikipedia).) (see also: May 19 - Synaxis of the New Hieromartyrs of Sloboda, Ukraine)

== Other commemorations ==
- Translation of the relics (c. 1103) of St. Michael (992), First Metropolitan of Kiev.

== Icon gallery ==
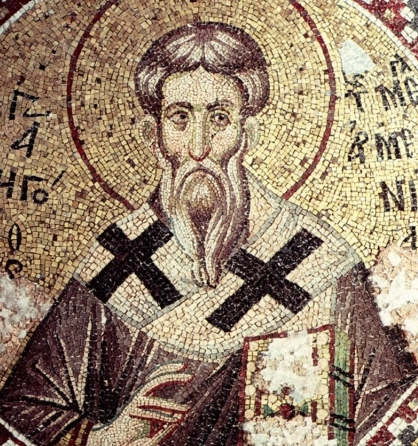
Hieromartyr Gregory the Illuminator, Bishop and Enlightener of Greater Armenia.

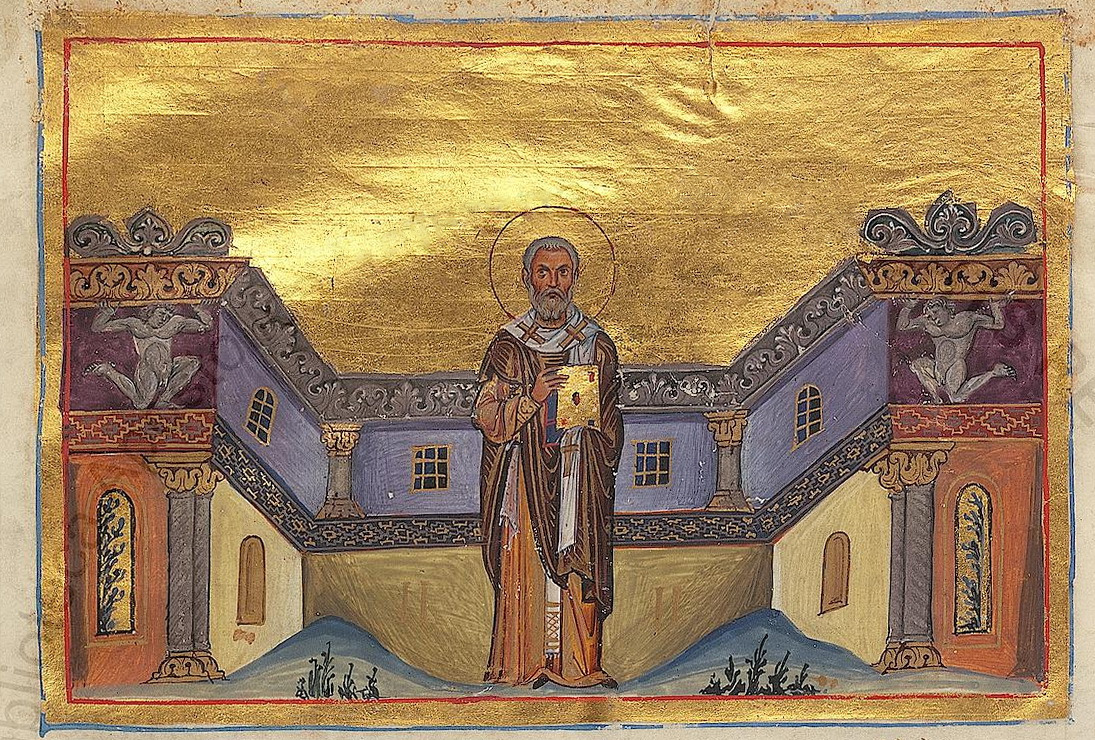
Hieromartyr Gregory the Illuminator, Bishop and Enlightener of Greater Armenia.
(Menologion of Basil II, 10th century).

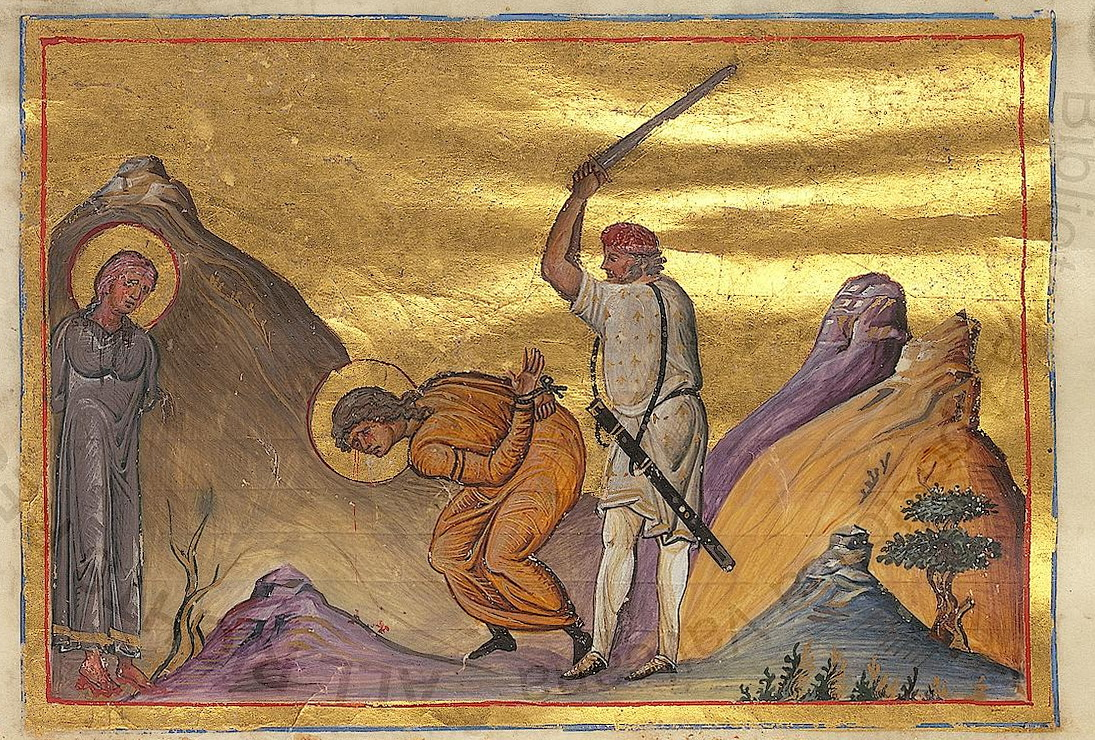
Martyrs Rhipsima and Gaiana.
(Menologion of Basil II, 10th century).

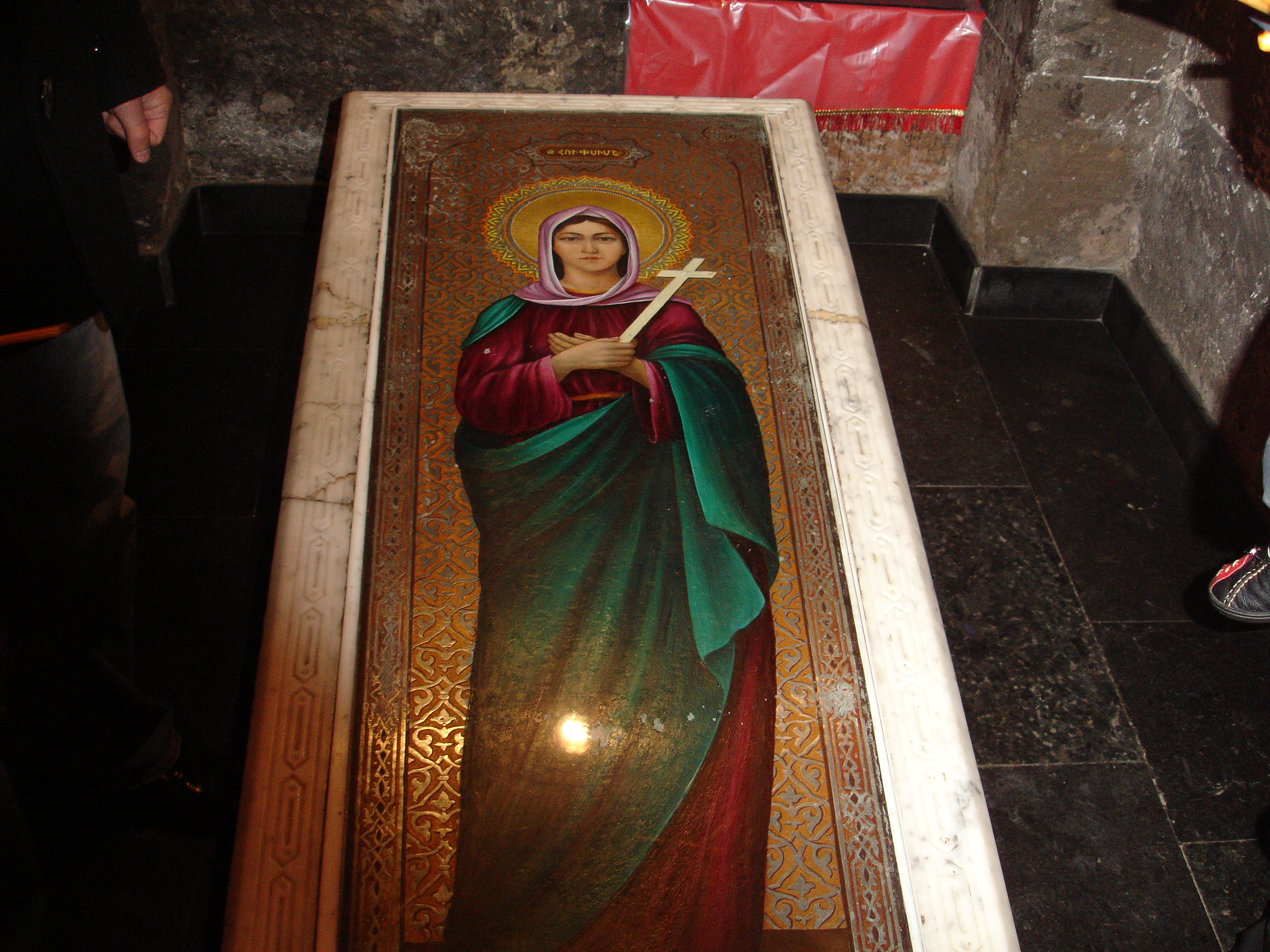
Tombstone of St. Rhipsima.

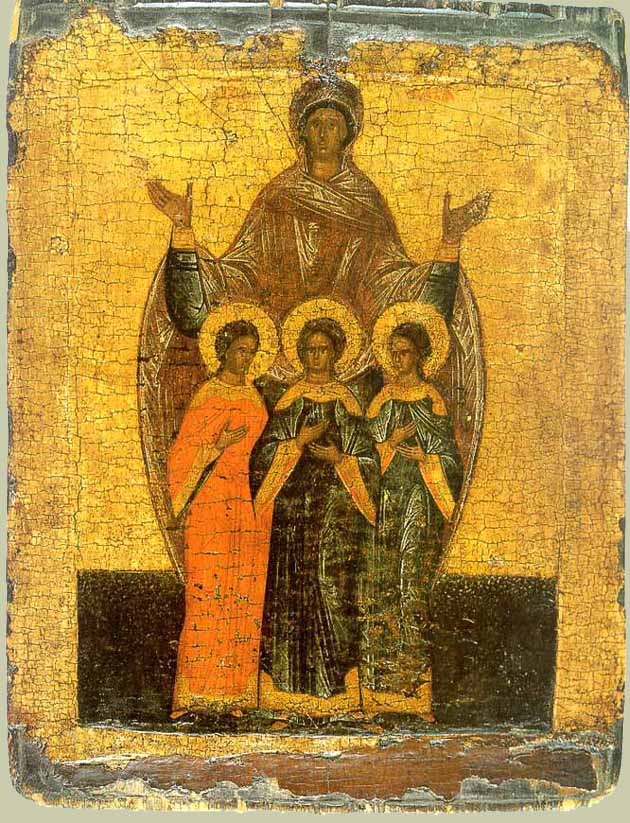
St. Sophia the Martyr.

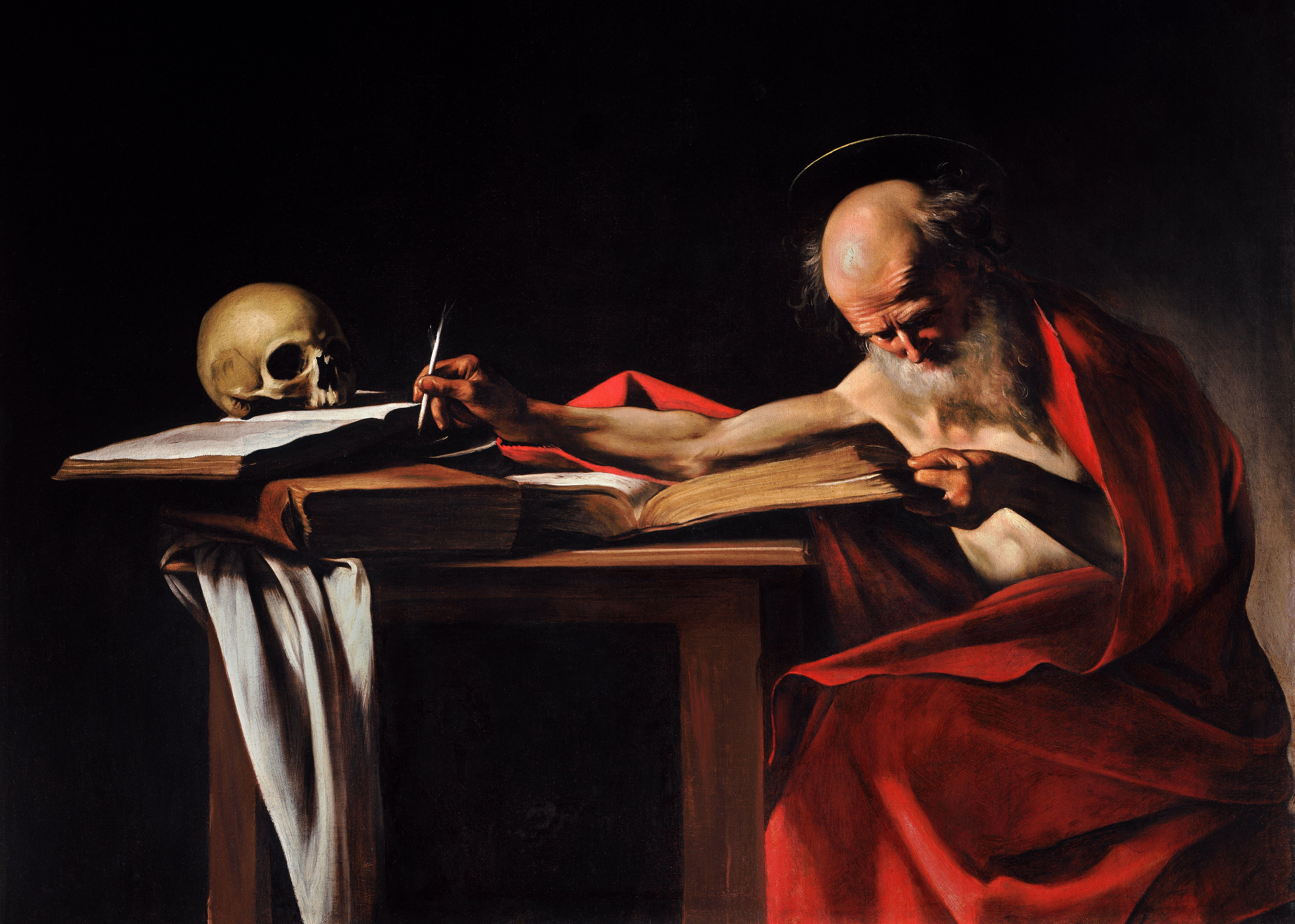
Saint Jerome Writing.

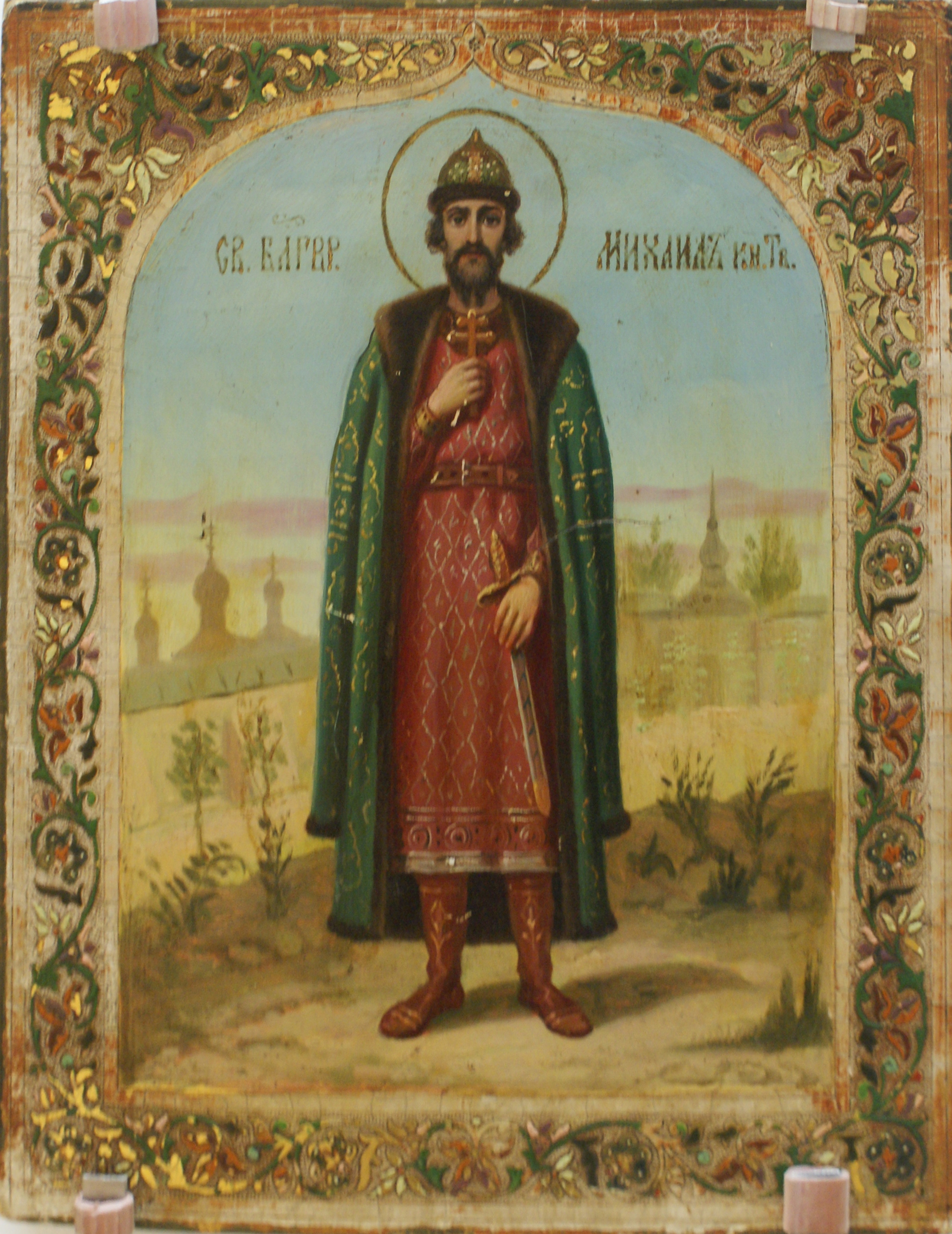
Saint Michael, Great Prince of Tver.

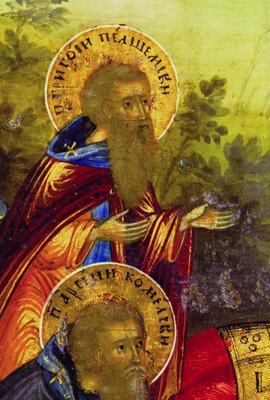
Venerable Gregory, founder of Pelshma Monastery in Vologda.

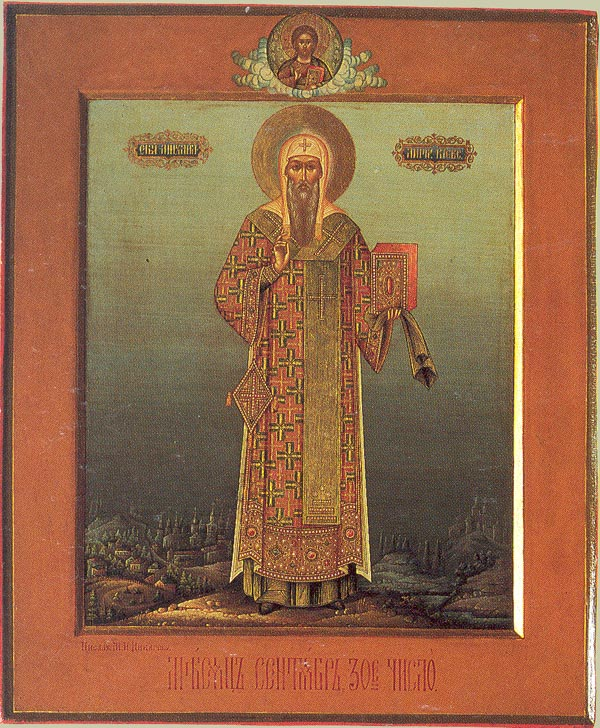
Michael, First Metropolitan of Kiev.

== Sources ==
- September 30/October 13. Orthodox Calendar (PRAVOSLAVIE.RU).
- October 13 / September 30. HOLY TRINITY RUSSIAN ORTHODOX CHURCH (A parish of the Patriarchate of Moscow).
- September 30. OCA - The Lives of the Saints.
- The Autonomous Orthodox Metropolia of Western Europe and the Americas (ROCOR). St. Hilarion Calendar of Saints for the year of our Lord 2004. St. Hilarion Press (Austin, TX). p. 73.
- The Thirtieth Day of the Month of September. Orthodoxy in China.
- September 30. Latin Saints of the Orthodox Patriarchate of Rome.
- The Roman Martyrology. Transl. by the Archbishop of Baltimore. Last Edition, According to the Copy Printed at Rome in 1914. Revised Edition, with the Imprimatur of His Eminence Cardinal Gibbons. Baltimore: John Murphy Company, 1916. pp. 301–302.
- Rev. Richard Stanton. A Menology of England and Wales, or, Brief Memorials of the Ancient British and English Saints Arranged According to the Calendar, Together with the Martyrs of the 16th and 17th Centuries. London: Burns & Oates, 1892. pp. 466–467.

Greek Sources

- Great Synaxaristes: (in Greek) 30 ΣΕΠΤΕΜΒΡΙΟΥ. ΜΕΓΑΣ ΣΥΝΑΞΑΡΙΣΤΗΣ.
- (in Greek) Συναξαριστής. 30 Σεπτεμβρίου. ECCLESIA.GR. (H ΕΚΚΛΗΣΙΑ ΤΗΣ ΕΛΛΑΔΟΣ).
- (in Greek) 30/09/2016. Ορθόδοξος Συναξαριστής.

Russian Sources

- (in Russian) 13 октября (30 сентября). Православная Энциклопедия под редакцией Патриарха Московского и всея Руси Кирилла (электронная версия). (Orthodox Encyclopedia - Pravenc.ru).
- (in Russian) 30 сентября по старому стилю / 13 октября по новому стилю. Русская Православная Церковь - Православный церковный календарь на 2016 год.
