= Elias of Palestine =

Elias of Palestine was an early Christian martyr. A priest, Elias was one of four Christians who led Mass for the persecuted Christians condemned to work in the Palestinian quarries in the wake of the Diocletianic Persecution. When the Roman emperor Galerius learned of this, he had Elias burned alive along with the other leaders (Peleus, Nilus and Patermutius), and the Christians dispersed to mines in Cyprus and Lebanon. He is venerated as a saint in the Roman Catholic Church and Eastern Orthodox Church.

== See also ==
- Diocletianic Persecution
