= Patermutius =

Saint Patermutius
- Born: Egypt
- Died: Palestine
- Feast: 19 September

Patermutius was an early Christian martyr. A layman, Patermutius was one of four Christians who led Mass for the persecuted Christians condemned to work in the Palestinian quarries in the wake of the Diocletianic Persecution. When the Roman emperor Galerius learned of this, he had Patermutius burned alive along with the other leaders (Peleus, Nilus, and Elias), and the Christians dispersed to mines in Cyprus and Lebanon. He is venerated as a saint in the Roman Catholic Church and Eastern Orthodox Church.

== Butler's account ==
The hagiographer Alban Butler wrote in his The Lives of the Fathers, Martyrs, and Other Principal Saints,

September 19 – SS. Peleus, Pa-Termuthes, and Companions, Martyrs THE HOLY confessors who were condemned to the mines in Palestine, during the course of the last general persecution, built little oratories, where they met to the divine service, which under their sufferings was their solid comfort. Firmilian, governor of Palestine, informed the Emperor Galerius of the liberty they had taken, and the tyrant sent an order that they should be sent, some to the mines in Cyprus, others to those on Mount Libanus, and others to other places. Firmilian being in the mean time beheaded himself for his crimes, the officer upon whom the command was devolved after his disgrace, removed the servants of God to the new places of their banishment, according to the tenour of the imperial rescript; but first caused four of their number to be burned alive. These were Peleus and Nilus, two Egyptian priests, Elias, also a priest, and Pa-Termuthes, an Egyptian of singular learning and reputation. This last was the person to whom Eusebius and St. Pamphilus addressed their apology for Origen. See Eus. Hist. de Martyr. Palestine, c. 13.

== See also ==
- Diocletianic Persecution

== Sources ==
- Butler, Alban (1866), The Lives of the Fathers, Martyrs, and Other Principal Saints, James Duffy
