= Landelin =

Merovingian noble and Frankish saint

Saint Landelin
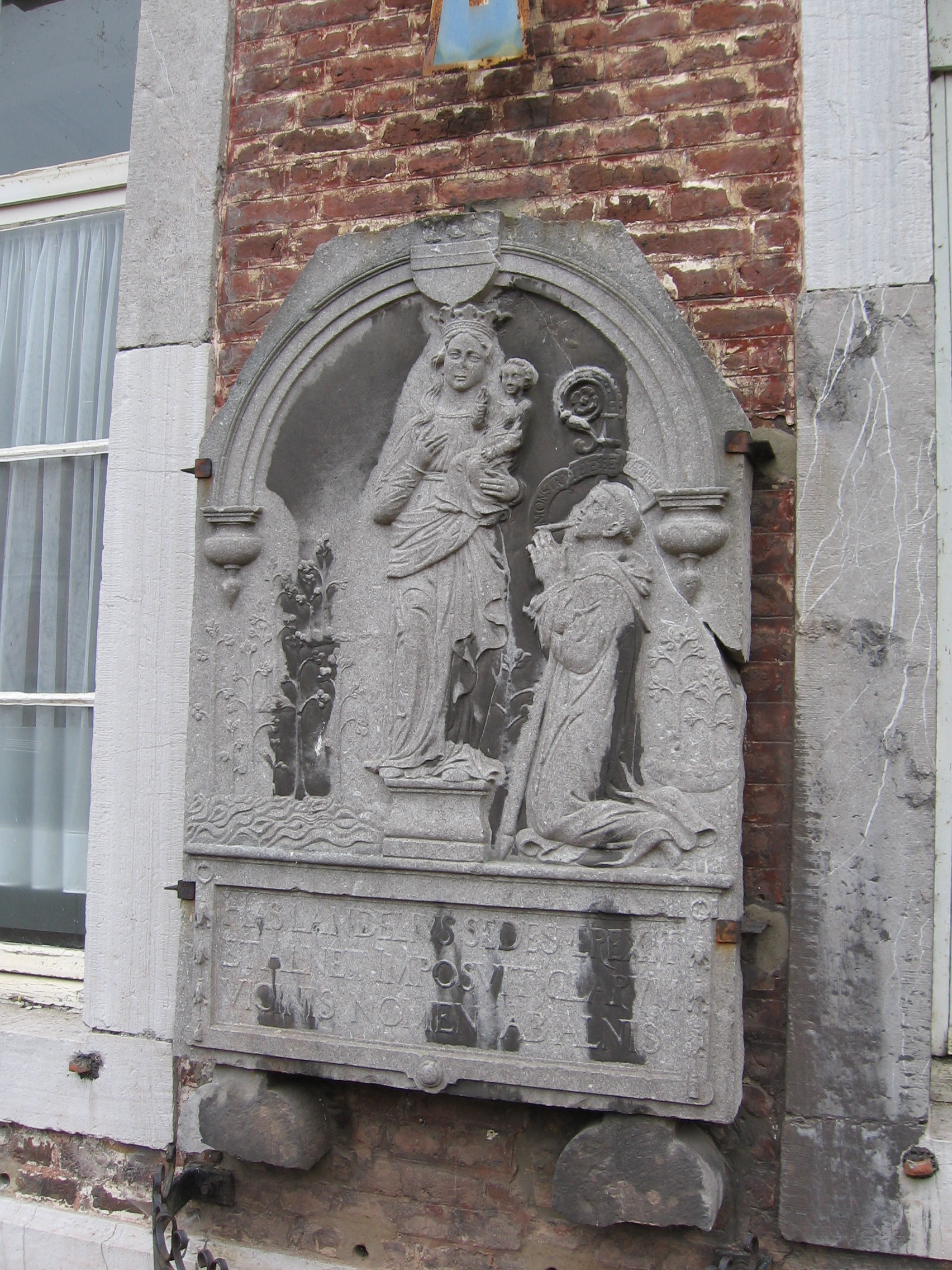
- Born: Landelin c. 623-625 AD; Vaux, Bapaume
- Died: 686 AD
- Venerated in: Eastern Orthodox Church; Roman Catholic Church
- Feast: June 15

Saint Landelin (Dutch and Latin: Landelinus; French: La(u)ndelin; c. 625 – 686 AD in what is now Belgium) is a saint in the Eastern Orthodox Church and Roman Catholic Church.

== Life ==
Landelin was born to a noble family at Vaux near Bapaume in c. 623-625 AD, and educated in learning and piety under the care of St. Aubert, bishop of Cambrai. Through the seduction and example of certain relations, whose flatteries unfortunately struck in with his passions, he insensibly began to walk in the broad way of the world, and from a life of pleasure and diversions, fell at length into great disorders and became a brigand.

The sudden death of one of his companions caused him to reconsider his path and he underwent a Christian conversion. Bishop Aubert placed him in an austere monastery to do penance for some years, and later ordained him deacon, and, when he was thirty years of age, priest, and appointed him to preach to the people. But Landelin begged leave to retire in solitude to Laubach, now called Lobes, a desert place on the banks of the Sambre.

Several persons resorting to him and imitating his manner of life, though at first they lived in separate cells, gave rise to the great abbey of Lobbes, about the year 654. when he had laid the foundation of this house, Landelin, left his disciple, St. Ursmar, to finish the building, and constituted him the first abbot.

As a result of this, in about 650 he founded a monastery at Lobbes in Hainaut - Lobbes Abbey - in order to make amends to the area which he had formerly injured.

He also founded Crespin Abbey, and is credited with the foundation of Aulne Abbey.

Once the number of monks had increased and the future of the community was assured Landelin resigned as abbot, in order to dedicate his life to the practice of austerities.

His feast day is June 15.

Landelin has been linked to the 7th-century Merovingian carved belt buckle, named the Landelinus buckle, by Italian scholar Paolo Serra.
