= Agathoclia =

Saint Agathoclia
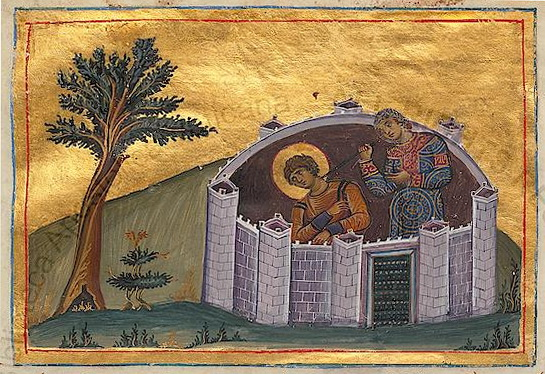
- Miniature from the Menologion of Basil II
- Died: c. 230 AD
- Venerated in: Eastern Orthodoxy; Roman Catholic Church
- Feast: September 17
- Patronage: Mequinenza, Aragon

Saint Agathoclia (Agathocleia; (Note: Latinization of the Greek name Ἀγαθόκλεια.) Spanish: Santa Agatoclia) (died c. 230 AD) is venerated as a patron saint of Mequinenza, Aragón, Spain. Her feast day is September 17.

== Biography ==
Tradition states that she was a virgin Christian slave owned by two people who had converted to paganism from Christianity, named Nicolas and Paulina. They subjected Agathoclia to regular physical abuse, including whipping and other violence, in an effort to get Agathoclia to renounce her faith. She repeatedly refused to do so.

Her owners then subjected her to a public trial by a local magistrate. There too, she refused to renounce Christianity, which subjected her to savage mangling from the authorities. When she was found guilty, her sentence included having her tongue cut out, a nonfatal injury.

There is some disagreement about how Agathoclia met her death. Some sources say that her mistress Paulina poured burning coals on her neck. Other sources say that she herself was cast into fire.

== Veneration ==
The town of Mequinenza celebrates festivals in honor of Santa Agatoclia (called simply “La Santa”) from September 16 to 20. There is also a confraternity in the town dedicated to the saint.

== See also ==
- List of enslaved people

== Sources ==
- Mequinensa page
- Brotherhood of Saint Agatoclia page
- Catholic Forum page
- St. Nicholas Russian Orthodox Church Dallas Texas page on Agathocleia
- The Roman Martyrology for September 17
- Dominican Martyrology page on September feasts
- September 17 page of grousrv.com
