= Saint Peleus =

Peleus
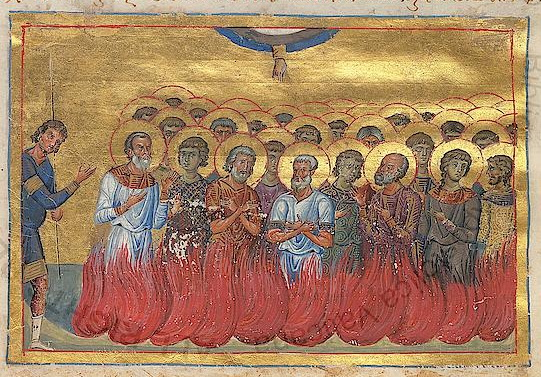
- The Holy Martyrs Peleus and Nilus, Bishops of Egypt, Presbyter Zeno, Patermuthius, Elias and another 151 Martyrs suffered during the reign of the emperor Maximian Galerius (305-311). The majority of them were Egyptians, but there were also some Palestinians among them. Firmilian, the governor of Palestine, arrested 156 Christians. They gouged out the eyes of the holy martyrs, cut the tendons of their feet, and subjected them to all manner of tortures. They beheaded 100 of the martyrs, and burned the rest.
- Residence: Egypt
- Venerated in: Roman Catholic Church and Orthodox Church

Saint Peleus was an early Christian martyr. An Egyptian bishop, Peleus was one of four Christians who led Mass for the persecuted Christians condemned to work in the Palestinian quarries in the wake of the Diocletianic Persecution. When the Roman emperor Galerius learned of this, he had Peleus burned alive along with the other leaders (Nilus, Elias and Patermutius), and the Christians dispersed to mines in Cyprus and Lebanon. He is venerated as a saint in the Roman Catholic Church, Eastern Orthodox Church and Coptic Orthodox Church.

== See also ==
- Diocletianic Persecution
