= Nilus of Palestine =

Egyptian bishop

Nilus of Palestine was an early Christian martyr. An Egyptian bishop, Nilus was one of four Christians who led Mass for the persecuted Christians condemned to work in the Palestinian quarries in the wake of the Diocletianic Persecution. When the Roman emperor Galerius learned of this, he had Nilus burned alive along with the other leaders (Peleus, Elias and Patermutius), and the Christians dispersed to mines in Cyprus and Lebanon. He is venerated as a saint in the Roman Catholic Church, Eastern Orthodox Church and Oriental Orthodox Churches.

== See also ==
- Diocletianic Persecution
