= Aulne Abbey =

Coordinates: 50°23′N 4°20′E

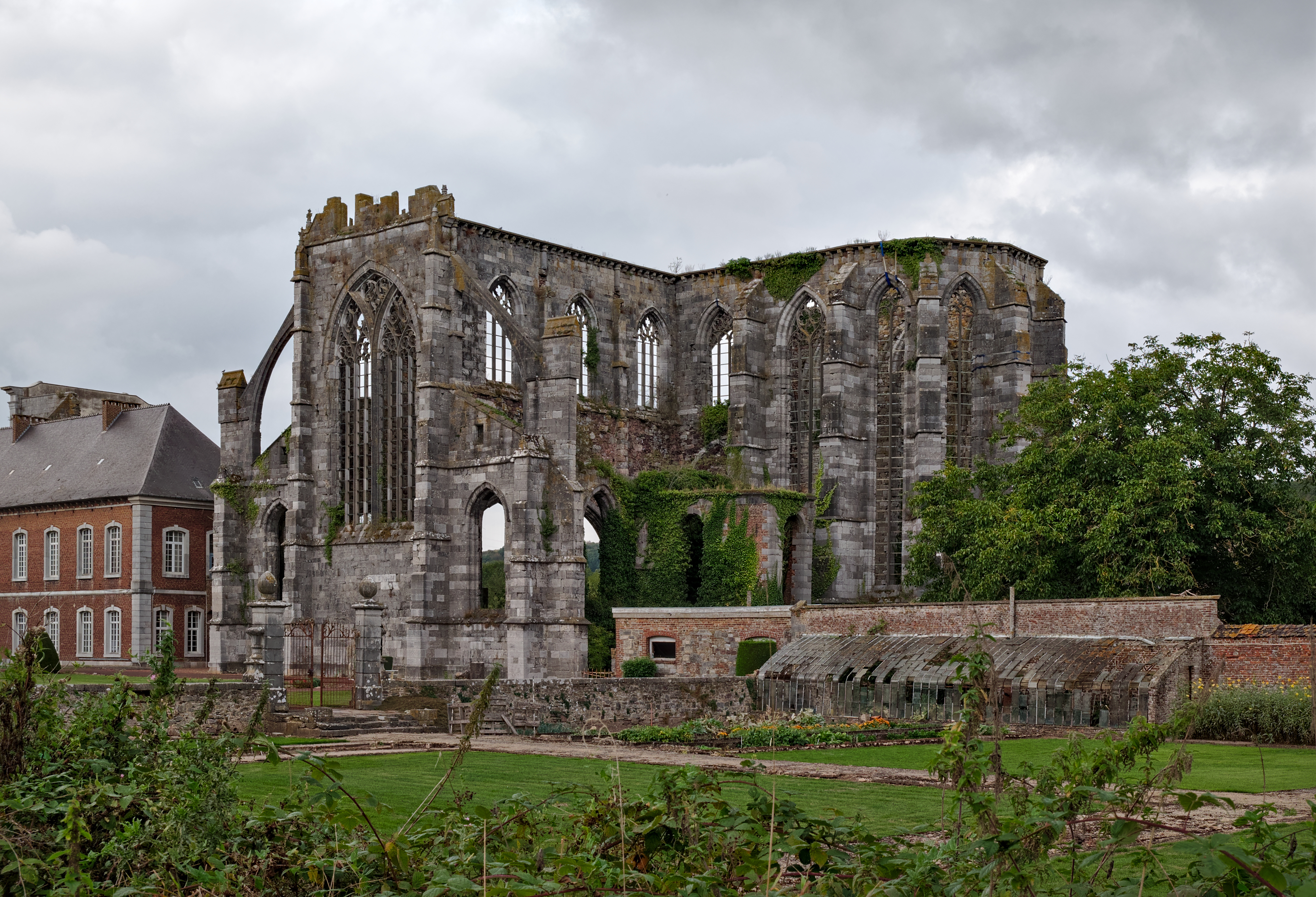
Ruins of Aulne Abbey

Aulne Abbey (French: Abbaye d'Aulne) was a Cistercian monastery located between Thuin and Landelies on the river Sambre in the Bishopric of Liège, Belgium. It is now a Walloon Heritage Site.

== History ==
Aulne Abbey was originally founded as a Benedictine monastery in 656, on the banks of the Sambre in the Vallée de la Paix ("Valley of Peace") in the Bishopric of Liège (modern-day Belgium), by Landelinus, abbot of Crespin Abbey. Sometime before 974 the Benedictines were replaced by secular clerics leading a common life, who, in 1144 adopted the Rule of St. Augustine.

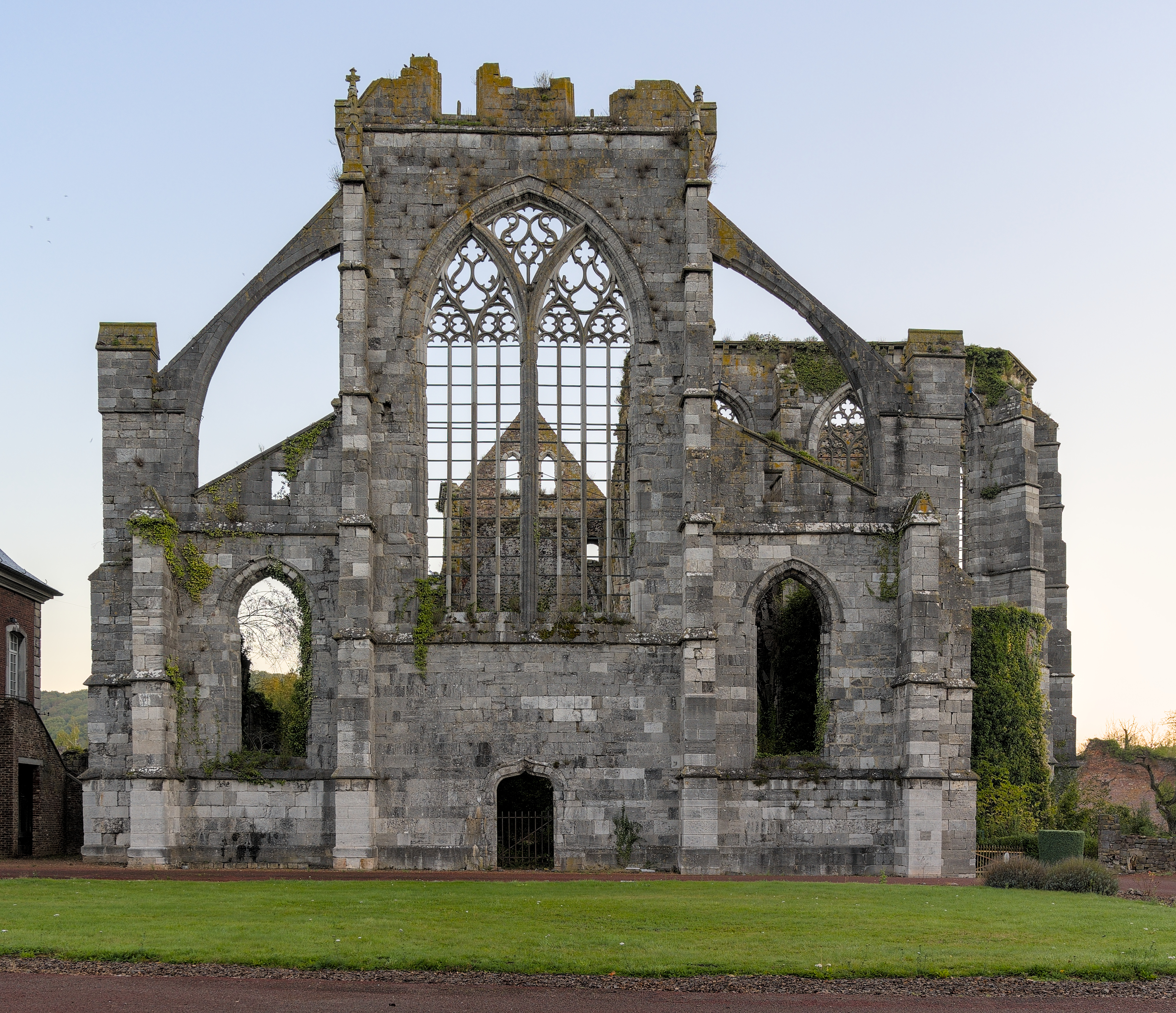
Facade of the abbey church

At the instance of Henry of Leyen, Bishop of Liège, it came into the hands of Cistercian monks from Clairvaux in 1147, under Franco de Morvaux as its first Cistercian abbot. From that time onwards it flourished as a Cistercian monastery. The monks constructed an extensive irrigation system and six ponds that provided fish for the abbey. Building commenced on the abbey church in 1214 by Father Gilles de Beaumont.

French revolutionary troops burned the abbey in 1794, only a short time after it had been rebuilt on a larger scale. The library, which contained 40,000 books and 5,000 manuscripts, was also destroyed. In 1859 the last monk died; the Monastery was abandoned and the abbot's residence turned into a hospice.

=== Simon of Aulne ===
The son of a Belgian nobleman descended from the counts of Guelders, at the age of sixteen, Simon joined the Cistercians at Aulne as a lay-brother. He was assigned to work in the monastery granaries and tend the sheep. Simon was a mystic who experienced visions and was believed to have the gift of reading hearts. His reputation spread and in 1215 he was summoned to Rome by Pope Innocent III to advise the Pope during the Fourth Lateran Council. After the council, the pope wished to ordain Simon to the priesthood, but he declined and returned to Aulne. He died at the age of eighty-four on November 6, 1228. Never formally canonized he has been venerated for centuries and is commemorated on November 6.

== Present day ==
In 2006, the abbey was acquired by the Walloon Region of Belgium as a historic monument. There is an onsite cafe for the convenience of visitors and an interpretive centre. An on-site brewery was revived in 1950.

== Sources ==
- Endnotes:
  - Boulmont, Gustave (1898). L'abbaye d'Aulne, ou origines, splendeurs, epreuves, et ruines de la perle monastique d'Entre-Sambre-et Meuse. Namur.
  - Cloquet, Louis (1904). L'abbeye d'Aulne. Mons.
  - Lebrocquy, Guillaume (1862). Histoire de l'abbaye d'Aulne. Paris.
