= Katharoi =

Katharoi (Greek for "the Pure") may refer to the members of one of these religious movements:

- Novatianism
- Catharism
