= Pope Eusebius =

Head of the Catholic Church from 309 to 310

Pope Saint Eusebius
- Bishop of Rome
- Church: Catholic Church
- Papacy began: 18 April 309
- Papacy ended: 21 October 310
- Predecessor: Marcellus I
- Successor: Miltiades

Personal details
- Born: 3rd century Rome, Italy, Roman Empire
- Died: 21 October 310 Sicily, Roman Empire

Sainthood
- Feast day: 17 August

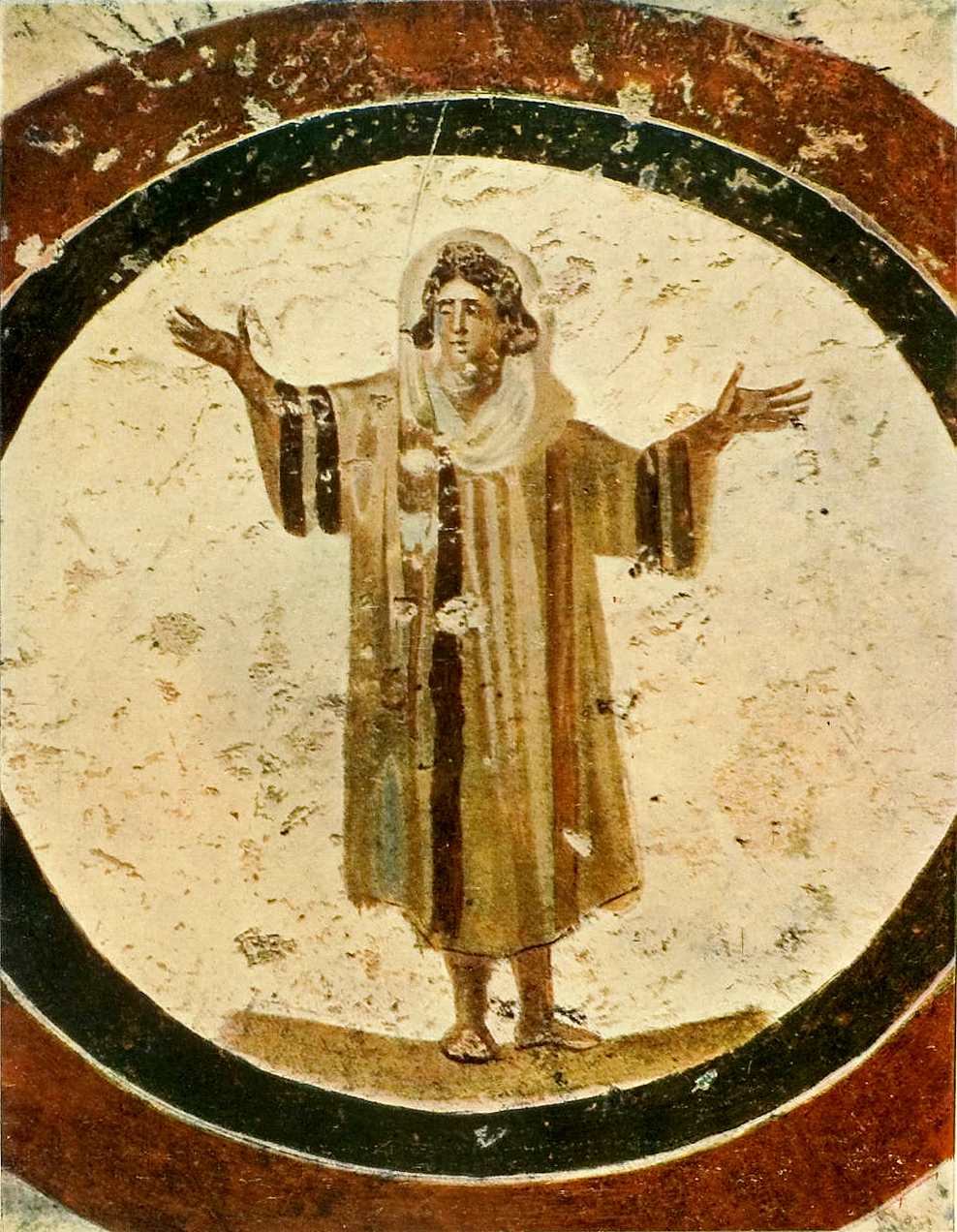
Portrait of a praying Christian in the Catacomb of Callixtus, Rome, contemporary with the life of Pope Eusebius (c. AD 250–300).

Pope Eusebius (died 21 October 310) was the bishop of Rome from 18 April 309 until his exile on 17 August 310.

== Biography ==
Not much is known about Eusebius's early life, but he was probably a Greek.

As in the case of his predecessor, Marcellus I, difficulty arose out of Eusebius's attitude toward the lapsi. Eusebius maintained the attitude of the Roman Church, adopted after the Decian persecutions (250–51), that the apostates should not be forever debarred from ecclesiastical communion, but readmitted after doing proper penance. This view was opposed by a faction of Christians in Rome under the leadership of Heraclius. Johann Peter Kirsch believes it likely that Heraclius was the chief of a party made up of apostates and their followers, who demanded immediate restoration to the Roman Church. Emperor Maxentius intervened and exiled them both on 17 August 310 (N.S..

Eusebius died in exile in Sicily on 21 October 310 N.S. and was buried in the catacomb of Callixtus. Pope Damasus I placed an epitaph over his tomb because of his firm defence of ecclesiastical discipline and the banishment which he suffered thereby. His feast is celebrated on 17 August. The feast had previously been observed on 26 September.

== Notes ==
Titles of the Great Christian Church
Preceded by Marcellus I	Bishop of Rome; 309–310	Succeeded by Miltiades
