= Antipope Heraclius =

Heretical antipope

- Elected: 310
- Papacy began: 310
- Papacy ended: 310
- Predecessor: Roman claimant: Eusebius; Antipapal claimant: Novatian
- Successor: Roman claimant: Eusebius; Antipapal claimant: Felix II
- Opposed to: Pope Eusebius

Heraclius was a Roman who, in 310, opposed the election of Pope Eusebius, earning him the title of antipope. All that is known of Heraclius appears in an epitaph written by Pope Damasus I for Eusebius. Heraclius and Eusebius disagreed over the policy which should be taken towards the lapsi (those Christians who had lapsed in their faith during persecution). Damasus' epitaph is ambiguous as to whether Heraclius' position was that the lapsi should be readmitted to the church without compelling them to do penance, or that they should not be readmitted at all, but Luxembourgish ecclesiastical historian Johann Peter Kirsch strongly assumes the former.

Heraclius was elected pope by his faction in opposition to Eusebius in 310. Public disturbances caused by partisans of the two rivals reached such a state (characterized by Damasus I as sedition, discord, and even warfare) that Emperor Maxentius exiled both parties to Sicily where Eusebius died, and where nothing more was heard of Heraclius.

== See also ==
- Novatianism
