= Acesius =

Novatianist bishop of Constantinople

- Occupation: Bishop of Constantinople

Acesius was a bishop of Constantinople, in the reign of Constantine. He was a disciple of Novatian, the founder of Novatianism, whose distinguishing doctrine was, that those who had fallen from the faith in time of persecution, or who after baptism had committed any mortal sin, were not to be admitted to the communion of the church, even if they gave evidence of sincere repentance. At the First Council of Nicaea, in 325, Constantine inquired of Acesius, whom, though separated from the communion of the church, he had invited to the council, about the ground of his separation. Acesius, in reply, admitted that the creed which had been subscribed by the synod was orthodox, and assented to their determination concerning the festival of Easter, but pleaded, as a sufficient reason for separation, the Novatian doctrine, which would not permit them to hold communion with those, who, in persecution under Decius, had forsaken the church. It was then that Constantine said, "Acesius, take a ladder, and climb up to heaven alone."
