= Syncatabasis =

Syncatabasis (Greek synkatabasis, lit. "going down together with", Latin condescensio; also anthropopatheia) in Christology is the "condescension" of God below his transcendence for the purpose of creation, and the ascription of human passions or attributes to God. The Hebrew term is derech benai Adam "the way of the sons of Man"

Novatian declares the Word (Sermo), His Son, is a substance that proceeds from the one God (substantia prolata), whose generation no apostle nor angel nor any creature can declare. He is not a second God, because He is eternally in the Father, else the Father would not be eternally Father. The syncatabasis takes place as He proceeded from the Father, when the Father willed it for the purpose of creation, while still remaining with the Father.

John Henry Newman refers to the Syncatabasis of the Son as one of the teachings of the church fathers of the first four centuries AD. In rhetorics, syncatabasis is the adoption of a level or style suitable for the audience addressed.

== See also ==
- Kenosis
- Avatar
- Bodhisattva
