= Martyrs of Carthage under Valerian =

Christians executed in the 3rd century

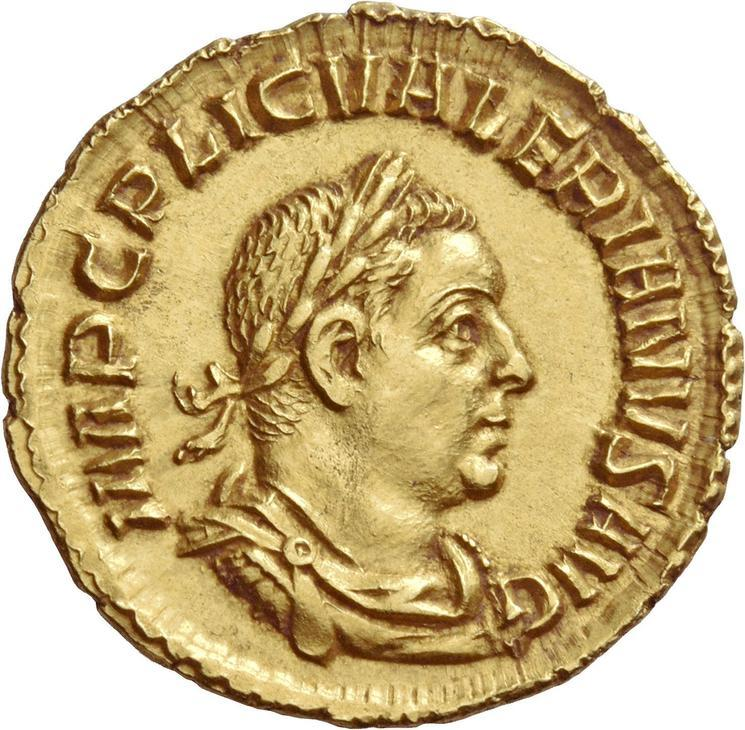
- Emperor Valerian
- Died: 259 AD; Carthage
- Feast: 24 February

The Martyrs of Carthage under Valerian were a group of Christians including Montanus, Lucius, Flavian, Julian, Victoricus, Primolus, Rhenus, and Donatian. All were executed during the persecutions of the Roman Emperor Valerian in 259 AD. Their feast day is 24 February.

== Source ==
The martyrs wrote a letter, which was the basis for part of the account of their martyrdom, and an eye-witness also left testimony. Alban Butler states that they are published more correctly by Thierry Ruinart than by Laurentius Surius and Jean Bolland. Their account has been reproduced at length by several hagiographers.

== Monks of Ramsgate account ==
The monks of St Augustine's Abbey, Ramsgate wrote in their Book of Saints (1921),

Montanus, Lucius, Julian, Victorious, Flavian and Others (SS.) MM. (Feb. 24)
(3rd cent.) Some of the many Christians, disciples of Saint Cyprian of Carthage, who were put to death during the fierce persecution of Christianity under the Emperor Valerian (A.D. 259). The story of their imprisonment is told by themselves, and that of their martyrdom by eye-witnesses.

== Butler's account ==
The hagiographer Alban Butler (1710–1773) wrote in his Lives of the Fathers, Martyrs, and Other Principal Saints under 24 February,

SS. Montanus, Lucius, Flavian, Julian, Victoricus, Primolus, Rhenus, and Donatian, Martyrs at Carthage

A.D. 259.

THE PERSECUTION, raised by Valerian, had raged two years, during which, many had received the crown of martyrdom, and, amongst others, St. Cyprian, in September, 258. The proconsul Galerius Maximus, who had pronounced sentence on that saint, dying himself soon after, the procurator, Solon, continued the persecution, waiting for the arrival of a new proconsul from Rome. After some days, a sedition was raised in Carthage against him, in which many were killed. The tyrannical man, instead of making search after the guilty, vented his fury upon the Christians, knowing this would be agreeable to the idolaters. Accordingly he caused these eight Christians, all disciples of St. Cyprian, and most of them of the clergy, to be apprehended.

As soon as we were taken, say the authors of the acts, we were given in custody to the officers of the quarter: when the governor’s soldiers told us that we should be condemned to the flames, we prayed to God with great fervour to be delivered from that punishment: and he, in whose hands are the hearts of men, was pleased to grant our request. The governor altered his first intent, and ordered us into a very dark and incommodious prison, where we found the priest, Victor, and some others: but we were not dismayed at the filth and darkness of the place, our faith and joy in the Holy Ghost reconciled us to our sufferings in that place, though these were such as it is not easy for words to describe; but the greater our trials, the greater is he who overcomes them in us. Our brother Rhenus, in the mean time, had a vision, in which he saw several of the prisoners going out of prison with a lighted lamp preceding each of them, whilst others, who had no such lamp stayed behind. He discerned us in this vision, and assured us that we were of the number of those who went forth with lamps. This gave us great joy; for we understood that the lamp represented Christ, the true light, and that we were to follow him by martyrdom.

The next day we were sent for by the governor, to be examined. It was a triumph to us to be conducted as a spectacle through the market-place and the streets, with our chains rattling. The soldiers, who knew not where the governor would hear us, dragged us from place to place, till, at length, he ordered us to be brought into his closet. He put several questions to us; our answers were modest, but firm: at length we were remanded to prison; here we prepared ourselves for new conflicts. The sharpest trial was that which we underwent by hunger and thirst, the governor having commanded that we should be kept without meat and drink for several days, insomuch that water was refused us after our work: yet Flavian, the deacon, added great voluntary austerities to these hardships, often bestowing on others that little refreshment which was most sparingly allowed us at the public charge.

God was pleased himself to comfort us in this our extreme misery, by a vision which he vouchsafed to the priest Victor, who suffered martyrdom a few days after. “I saw last night,” said he to us, “an infant, whose countenance was of a wonderful brightness, enter the prison. He took us to all parts to make us go out, but there was no outlet; then he said to me, ‘You have still some concern at your being retained here, but be not discouraged, I am with you: carry these tidings to your companions, and let them know that they shall have a more glorious crown.’ I asked him where heaven was; the infant replied, ‘Out of the world.’” Show it me, says Victor. The infant then answered, “Where then would be your faith?” Victor said, “I cannot retain what you command me: tell me a sign that I may give them.” He answered, “Give them the sign of Jacob, that is, his mystical ladder, reaching to the heavens.” Soon after this vision, Victor was put to death. This vision filled us with joy.

God gave us, the night following, another assurance of his mercy by a vision to our sister Quartillosia, a fellow-prisoner, whose husband and son had suffered death for Christ three days before, and who followed them by martyrdom a few days after. “I saw,” says she, “my son who suffered; he was in the prison sitting on a vessel of water, and said to me: ‘God has seen your sufferings.’ Then entered a youug man of a wonderful stature, and he said: ‘Be of good courage, God hath remembered you.’”

The martyrs had received no nourishment the preceding day, nor had they any on the day that followed this vision; but at length Lucian, then priest, and afterwards bishop of Carthage, surmounting all obstacles, got food to be carried to them in abundance by the subdeacon, Herennian, and by Januarius, a catechumen. The acts say they brought the never failing food, which Tillemont understands of the blessed eucharist, and the following words still more clearly determine it in favour of this sense. They go on: We have all one and the same spirit, which unites and cements us together in prayer, in mutual conversation, and in all our actions. These are those amiable bands which put the devil to flight, are most agreeable to God, and obtain of him, by joint prayer, whatever they ask. These are the ties which link hearts together, and which make men the children of God. To be heirs of his kingdom we must be his children, and to be his children we must love one another. It is impossible for us to attain to the inheritance of his heavenly glory, unless we keep that union and peace with all our brethren which our heavenly Father has established amongst us. Nevertheless, this union suffered some prejudice in our troop, but the breach was soon repaired. It happened that Montanus had some words with Julian, about a person who was not of our communion, and who was got among us (probably admitted by Julian). Montanus on this account rebuked Julian, and they, for some time afterwards, behaved towards each other with coldness, which was, as it were, a seed of discord. Heaven had pity on them both, and, to reunite them, admonished Montanus by a dream, which he related to us as follows: “It appeared to me that the centurions were come to us, and that they conducted us through a long path into a spacious field, where we were met by Cyprian and Lucius. After this we came into a very luminous place, where our garments became white, and our flesh became whiter than our garments, and so wonderfully transparent, that there was nothing in our hearts but what was clearly exposed to view: but in looking into myself, I could discover some filth in my own bosom; and, meeting Lucian, I told him what I had seen, adding, that the filth I had observed within my breast denoted my coldness towards Julian. Wherefore, brethren, let us love, cherish, and promote, with all our might, peace and concord. Let us be here unanimous in imitation of what we shall be hereafter. As we hope to share in the rewards promised to the just, and to avoid the punishments wherewith the wicked are threatened: as, in fine, we desire to be and reign with Christ, let us do those things which will lead us to him and his heavenly kingdom.” Hitherto the martyrs wrote in prison what happened to them there: the rest was written by those persons who were present, to whom Flavian, one of the martyrs, had recommended it.

After suffering extreme hunger and thirst, with other hardships, during an imprisonment of many months, the confessors were brought before the president, and made a glorious confession. The edict of Valerian condemned only bishops, priests, and deacons to death. The false friends of Flavian maintained before the judge that he was no deacon, and, consequently was not comprehended within the emperor’s decree; upon which, though he declared himself to be one, he was not then condemned; but the rest were adjudged to die. They walked cheerfully to the place of execution, and each of them gave exhortations to the people. Lucius, who was naturally mild and modest, was a little dejected on account of his distemper, and the inconveniences of the prison; he therefore went before the rest, accompanied but by a few persons, lest he should be oppressed by the crowd, and so not have the honour to spill his blood. Some cried out to him, “Remember us.” “Do you also,” says he, “remember me.”

Julian and Victorius exhorted a long while the brethren to peace, and recommended to their care the whole body of the clergy, those especially who had undergone the hardships of imprisonment. Montanus, who was endued with great strength, both of body and mind, cried out, “He that sacrificeth to any God but the true one, shall be utterly destroyed.” This he often repeated. He also checked the pride and wicked obstinacy of the heretics, telling them that they might discern the true church by the multitude of its martyrs. Like a true disciple of Saint Cyprian, and a zealous lover of discipline, he exhorted those that had fallen not to be over hasty, but fully to accomplish their penance. He exhorted the virgins to preserve their purity, and to honour the bishops, and all the bishops to abide in concord. When the executioner was ready to give the stroke, he prayed aloud to God that Flavian, who had been reprieved at the people’s request, might follow them on the third day. And, to express his assurance that his prayer was heard, he rent in pieces the handkerchief with which his eyes were to be covered, and ordered one half of it to be reserved for Flavian, and desired that a place might be kept for him where he was to be interred, that they might not be separated even in the grave.

Flavian, seeing his crown delayed, made it the object of his ardent desires and prayers. And as his mother stuck close by his side with the constancy of the mother of the holy Maccabees, and with longing desires to see him glorify God by his sacrifice, he said to her: “You know, mother, how much I have longed to enjoy the happiness of dying by martyrdom.” In one of the two nights which he survived, he was favoured with a vision, in which one said to him: “Why do you grieve? You have been twice a confessor, and you shall suffer martyrdom by the sword.” On the third day he was ordered to be brought before the governor. Here it appeared how much he was beloved by the people, who endeavoured by all means to save his life. They cried out to the judge that he was no deacon; but he affirmed that he was. A centurion presented a billet which set forth that he was not. The judge accused him of lying to procure his own death. He answered: “Is that probable? and not rather that they are guilty of an untruth who say the contrary?” The people demanded that he might be tortured in hopes he would recall his confession on the rack; but the judge condemned him to be beheaded. The sentence filled him with joy, and he was conducted to the place of execution, accompanied by a great multitude, and by many priests. A shower dispersed the infidels, and the martyr was led into a house where he had an opportunity of taking his last leave of the faithful without one profane person being present. He told them that in a vision he had asked Cyprian whether the stroke of death is painful, and that the martyr answered; “The body feels no pain when the soul gives herself entirely to God.” At the place of execution he prayed for the peace of the church and the union of the brethren; and seemed to foretell Lucian that he should be bishop of Carthage, as he was soon after. Having done speaking, he bound his eyes with that half of the handkerchief which Montanus had ordered to be kept for him, and, kneeling in prayer, received the last stroke. These saints are joined together on this day in the present Roman and in ancient Martyrologies.

Sabine Baring-Gould (1834–1924) gives a near-identical version of the above in his Lives Of The Saints.

== Sources ==
- Baring-Gould, Sabine (1897), The Lives Of The Saints, vol. 2, February, London: J. C. Nimmo
- Butler, Alban (1866), The Lives of the Fathers, Martyrs, and Other Principal Saints, vol. 2, James Duffy This article incorporates text from this source, which is in the public domain.
- Liguori, Alphonsus (1888), Victories of the Martyrs: Or, The Lives of the Most Celebrated Martyrs of the Church, Benziger Bros.
- St. Augustine's Abbey, Ramsgate (1921), The Book of saints : a dictionary of servants of God canonized by the Catholic Church, London: A. & C. Black, ltd. This article incorporates text from this source, which is in the public domain.
