= Cyprian =

Bishop of Carthage and Christian writer (c. 210–258)

Saint Cyprian
- Bishop of Carthage
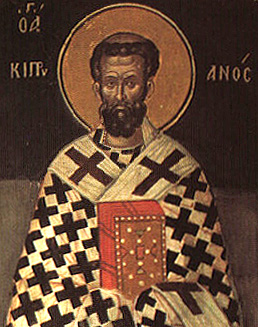
- See: Carthage
- Appointed: 248 or 249 AD
- Term ended: 14 September 258 AD
- Predecessor: Donatus I
- Successor: Carpophorus

Personal details
- Born: c. 210 Carthage, Roman Empire
- Died: 14 September 258 (aged 47–48) Carthage, Roman Empire

Sainthood
- Feast day: 16 September (Catholic Church, Western Rite Orthodoxy, and Lutheran); 31 August (Eastern Orthodox); 26 September (Anglican); 14 September (historical Sarum Use)
- Venerated in: Catholic Church; Oriental Orthodox Churches; Eastern Orthodox Church; Lutheranism; Anglicanism
- Patronage: North Africa, Berbers

Cyprian (/ˈsɪpriən/; Latin: Thascius Caecilius Cyprianus; c. 210 to 14 September 258 AD) was a bishop of Carthage and an early Christian writer of Berber descent, many of whose Latin works are extant. He is recognized as a saint in the Western and Eastern churches.

He was born around the beginning of the 3rd century in North Africa, perhaps at Carthage, where he received a classical education. Soon after converting to Christianity, he became a bishop in 249. A controversial figure during his lifetime, his strong pastoral skills, firm leadership during the Novatianist controversy and outbreak of the Plague of Cyprian (named for his description of it), and eventual martyrdom at Carthage established his reputation and proved his sanctity in the eyes of the Church.

His skilful Latin rhetoric led to his being considered the pre-eminent Latin writer of Western Christianity until Jerome and Augustine.

== Early life ==
Cyprian was born into a rich pagan Roman African Carthaginian family sometime during the early third century. His original name was Thascius; he took the additional name Caecilius in memory of the priest to whom he owed his conversion. Before his conversion, he was a leading member of a legal fraternity in Carthage, an orator, a "pleader in the courts", and a teacher of rhetoric. After a "dissipated youth", Cyprian was baptized when he was thirty-five years old, c. 245 AD. After his baptism, he gave away a portion of his wealth to the poor of Carthage, as befitted a man of his status.

In the early days of his conversion, he wrote an Epistola ad Donatum de gratia Dei and the Testimoniorum Libri III that adhere closely to the models of Tertullian, who influenced his style and thinking. Cyprian described his own conversion and baptism in the following words:

When I was still lying in darkness and gloomy night, I used to regard it as extremely difficult and demanding to do what God's mercy was suggesting to me... I myself was held in bonds by the innumerable errors of my previous life, from which I did not believe I could possibly be delivered, so I was disposed to acquiesce in my clinging vices and to indulge my sins... But after that, with the help of the water of new birth, the stain of my former life was washed away, and a light from above, serene and pure, was infused into my reconciled heart... a second birth restored me to a new man. Then, in a wondrous manner, every doubt began to fade... I clearly understood that what had first lived within me, enslaved by the vices of the flesh, was earthly and that what, instead, the Holy Spirit had wrought within me was divine and heavenly.

== Contested election as bishop of Carthage ==
Not long after his baptism, he was ordained a deacon and soon afterwards a priest. Sometime between July 248 and April 249, he was elected bishop of Carthage, a popular choice among the poor who remembered his patronage as demonstrating good equestrian style. However, his rapid rise did not meet with the approval of senior members of the clergy in Carthage, an opposition that did not disappear during his episcopate.

Not long afterwards, the entire community was put to an unwanted test. Christians in North Africa had not suffered persecution for many years; the Church was assured and lax. In early 250, the Decian persecution began. Emperor Decius issued an edict, the text of which is lost, ordering sacrifices to the gods to be made throughout the Empire. Jews were specifically exempted from that requirement. Cyprian chose to go into hiding, rather than face potential execution. While some clergy saw that decision as a sign of cowardice, Cyprian defended himself by saying that he had fled in order not to leave the faithful without a shepherd during the persecution and that his decision to continue to lead them, although from a distance, was in accordance with divine will. Moreover, he pointed to the actions of the Apostles and Jesus himself: "And therefore the Lord commanded us in the persecution to depart and to flee; and both taught that this should be done, and Himself did it. For as the crown is given by the condescension of God, and cannot be received unless the hour comes for accepting it, whoever abiding in Christ departs for a while does not deny his faith, but waits for the time..."

== Controversy over the lapsed ==
The persecution was especially severe at Carthage, according to Church sources. Many Christians fell away and were thereafter referred to as "Lapsi" (fallen). The majority had obtained signed statements (libelli) certifying that they had sacrificed to the Roman gods to avoid persecution or confiscation of property. In some cases, Christians had actually sacrificed, whether under torture or otherwise. Cyprian found those libellatici especially cowardly and demanded that they and the rest of the lapsi undergo public penance before being readmitted to the Church.

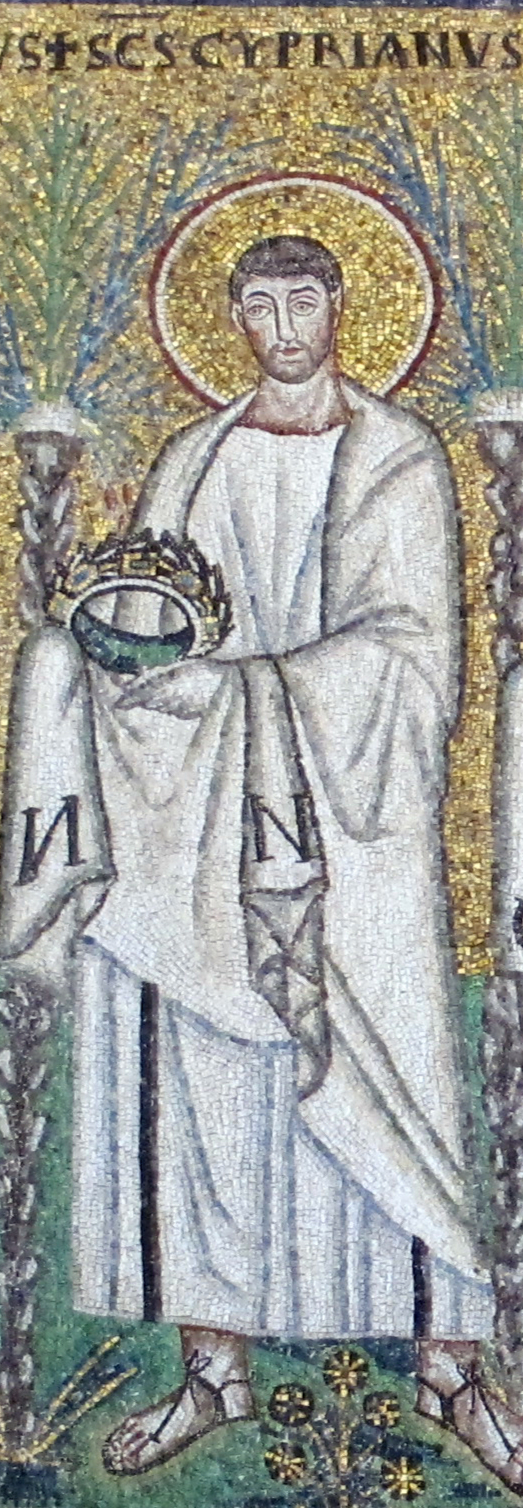
Mosaic of Saint Cyprian of Carthage in the Basilica of Sant'Apollinare Nuovo in Ravenna

However, in Cyprian's absence, some priests disregarded his wishes by readmitting the lapsed to communion with little or no public penance. Some of the lapsi presented a second libellus purported to bear the signature of some martyr or confessor who, it was held, had the spiritual prestige to reaffirm individual Christians. That system was not limited to Carthage, but on a wider front by its charismatic nature, it clearly constituted a challenge to institutional authority in the Church, in particular to that of the bishop. Hundreds or even thousands of lapsi were readmitted that way against the express wishes of Cyprian and the majority of the Carthaginian clergy, who insisted upon earnest repentance.

A schism then broke out in Carthage, as the laxist party, led largely by the priests who had opposed Cyprian's election, attempted to block measures taken by him during his period of absence. After fourteen months, Cyprian returned to the diocese and in letters addressed to the other North African bishops defended having left his post. After issuing a tract, "De lapsis" (On the Fallen), he convoked a council of North African bishops at Carthage to consider the treatment of the lapsed and the apparent schism of Felicissimus (251). Cyprian took a middle course between the followers of Novatus of Carthage, who were in favour of welcoming back all with little or no penance, and Novatian of Rome, who would not allow any of those who had lapsed to be reconciled. The council in the main sided with Cyprian and condemned Felicissimus though no acts of that council survive.

The schism continued as the laxists elected a certain Fortunatus as bishop in opposition to Cyprian. At the same time, the rigorist party in Rome, who refused reconciliation to any of the lapsed, elected Novatian as bishop of Rome in opposition to Pope Cornelius. The Novatianists also secured the election of a certain Maximus as a rival bishop of their own at Carthage. Cyprian now found himself wedged between laxists and rigorists, but the polarisation highlighted the firm but moderate position adopted by Cyprian and strengthened his influence by wearing down the numbers of his opponents. Moreover, his dedication during the time of a great plague and famine gained him still further popular support.

Cyprian wrote De mortalitate, and in De eleemosynis exhorted them to active charity towards the poor and set a personal example. He defended Christianity and the Christians in the apologia Ad Demetrianum, directed against a certain Demetrius, and countered pagan claims that Christians were the cause of the public calamities.

== Persecution under Valerian ==
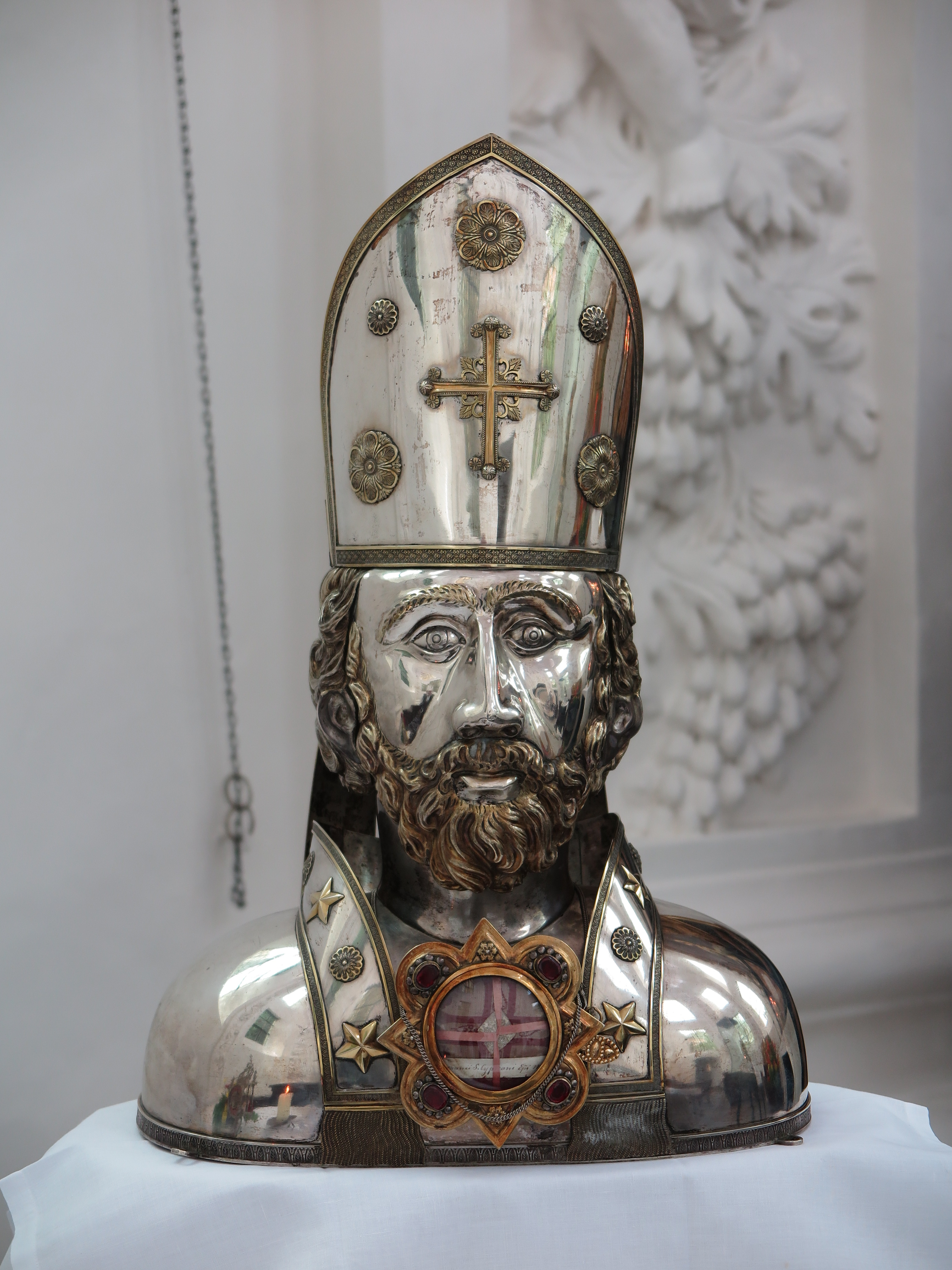
Relic of Cyprian in Kornelimünster Abbey

In late 256, a new persecution of the Christians broke out under Emperor Valerian, and Pope Sixtus II was executed in Rome.

In Africa, Cyprian prepared his people for the expected edict of persecution by his De exhortatione martyrii and set an example when he was brought before the Roman proconsul Aspasius Paternus (30 August 257). He refused to sacrifice to the pagan deities and firmly professed Christ.

The proconsul banished him to Curubis, now Korba. In a vision, he believed he saw his approaching fate. When a year had passed, he was recalled and kept practically a prisoner in his own villa in expectation of severe measures after a new and more stringent imperial edict arrived, which Christian writers subsequently claimed demanded the execution of all Christian clerics.

On 13 September 258, Cyprian was imprisoned on the orders of the new proconsul, Galerius Maximus. The public examination of Cyprian by Galerius Maximus, on 14 September 258, has been preserved:

Galerius Maximus: "Are you Thascius Cyprianus?"
Cyprian: "I am."
Galerius: "The most sacred Emperors have commanded you to conform to the Roman rites."
Cyprian: "I refuse."
Galerius: "Take heed for yourself."
Cyprian: "Do as you are bid; in so clear a case I may not take heed."
Galerius, after briefly conferring with his judicial council, with much reluctance pronounced the following sentence: "You have long lived an irreligious life, and have drawn together a number of men bound by an unlawful association, and professed yourself an open enemy to the gods and the religion of Rome; and the pious, most sacred and august Emperors ... have endeavoured in vain to bring you back to conformity with their religious observances; whereas therefore you have been apprehended as principal and ringleader in these infamous crimes, you shall be made an example to those whom you have wickedly associated with you; the authority of law shall be ratified in your blood." He then read the sentence of the court from a written tablet: "It is the sentence of this court that Thascius Cyprianus be executed with the sword."

Cyprian: "Thanks be to God."

The execution was carried out at once in an open place near the city. A vast multitude followed Cyprian on his last journey. He removed his garments without assistance, knelt down, and prayed. After he blindfolded himself, he was beheaded by the sword. The body was interred by Christians near the place of execution.

Cyprian's martyrdom was followed by the martyrdom of eight of his disciples in Carthage.

== Writings ==
Cyprian's works were edited in volumes 3 and 4 of the Patrologia Latina. He was not a speculative theologian, his writings being always related to his pastoral ministry. The first major work was a monologue spoken to a friend called Ad Donatum, detailing his own conversion, the corruption of Roman government and the gladiatorial spectacles, and pointing to prayer as "the only refuge of the Christian". Another early written work was the Testimonia ad Quirinum. During his exile from Carthage Cyprian wrote his most famous treatise, De Ecclesiae Catholicae Unitate (On the Unity of the Catholic Church) and on returning to his see, he issued De Lapsis (On the Fallen). Another important work is his Treatise on the Lord's Prayer. Doubtless only part of his written output has survived, and this must apply especially to his correspondence, of which some sixty letters are extant, in addition to some of the letters he received.

Cyprian of Carthage is often confused with Cyprian of Antioch, reputedly a magician before his conversion. A number of grimoires, such as Libellus Magicus, are thus mistakenly attributed to Cyprian of Carthage.

== Biography ==
Pontius the Deacon wrote a biography of Cyprian titled The Life and Passion of St. Cyprian, which details the saint's early life, his conversion, notable acts, and martyrdom under Valerian.

== Theology ==
=== Sacraments ===
Cyprian believed in infant baptism and infant communion. Cyprian, however, spoke against the efficacy of baptism performed by heretics and insisted on their rebaptism, and he believed that the Eucharist cannot be properly consecrated outside the Church.

Cyprian was one of the earliest of the Church Fathers to enunciate clearly and unambiguously the doctrine of baptismal regeneration ("the idea that salvation happens at and by water baptism duly administered"): "While he attributed all the saving energy to the grace of God, he considered the 'laver of saving water' the instrument of God that makes a person 'born again,' receiving a new life and putting off what he had previously been. The 'water of new birth' animated him to new life by the Spirit of holiness working through it."

=== Church ===
Cyprian believed that the lapsed could be re-admitted to the Church after penance and he opposed the Novatians.

Cyprian believed the see of Peter (Rome) is the direct heir of Peter. While Cyprian believed that all the apostles were equal and that all the bishops followed the Apostles in succession, Cyprian emphasized the unity of the Church under a single cathedra (chair): "he [Jesus Christ] assigns a like power to all the apostles, yet he founded a single chair [cathedra], and he established by his own authority a source and an intrinsic reason for that unity. Indeed, the others were that also which Peter was [i.e., apostles], but a primacy is given to Peter, whereby it is made clear that there is but one Church and one chair. So too, all [the apostles] are shepherds, and the flock is shown to be one, fed by all the apostles in single-minded accord."

=== Other ===
Cyprian was amillennial. Augustine argued that Cyprian taught the gift of perseverance. Cyprian argued that each day of the Genesis creation account consisted of 1,000 years.

== Veneration ==
Churches were erected over his tomb and over the place of his death. In later centuries, however, these churches were destroyed by the Vandals. The graves of such saints as Cyprian and Martin of Tours came to be regarded as "contact points between Heaven and Earth", and they became the centres of new, redefined, Christian urban communities. A surviving homily from Augustine on Cyprian's feast day indicates that his following was fairly widespread throughout Africa by the fourth century.

Charlemagne is said to have had the bones transferred to France; and Lyon, Arles, Venice, Compiègne, and Roenay in Flanders all have claimed to possess part of the martyr's relics.

The Catholic Church celebrates his feast day together with that of his good friend Pope Cornelius on 16 September, and in the Catholic Middle Ages the Sarum use observed it on the day of his death, 14 September. The Eastern Orthodox Church commemorates him on 31 August. Lutherans now commemorate him on 16 September, while Anglicans celebrate his feast usually either on 13 September (e.g. the Anglican Church of Australia) or 15 September (the present-day Church of England Calendar of saints) remembers him with a Lesser Festival.

== Sources ==
=== English Translations of Works by St. Cyprian ===
- St. Cyprian. The lapsed. The unity of the Catholic Church, translated and annotated by Maurice Bévenot, SJ), 1957 (Ancient Christian Writers, 25) ISBN 9780809102600
- The Letters of St. Cyprian of Carthage, translated and annotated by G.W. Clarke), 4 vols., 1984-89 (Ancient Christian Writers, 43–44, 46–47) ISBN 9780809103416, 9780809103423, 9780809103690, 9780809103706
- Brent, Allen, editor and translator, "St Cyprian of Carthage: Selected Treatises," St. Vladimir's Seminary Press, 2007, ISBN 0-88141-312-7
- Brent, Allen, editor and translator, "St Cyprian of Carthage: Selected Letters," St. Vladimir's Seminary Press, 2007, ISBN 0-88141-313-5
- Butler, Alban (1866), The Lives of the Fathers, Martyrs, and Other Principal Saints, vol. 2, James Duffy
- Campbell, Phillip, editor, "The Complete works of Saint Cyprian" Evolution Publishing, 2013, ISBN 1-935228-11-0
- Christian Classics Ethereal Library: Cyprian texts

=== Others ===
- Daniel, Robin, "This Holy Seed: Faith, Hope and Love in the Early Churches of North Africa", (Chester, Tamarisk Publications, 2010: from www.opaltrust.org) ISBN 0-9538565-3-4
- Olson, Roger E. (1999). The Story of Christian Theology: Twenty Centuries of Tradition Reform. InterVarsity Press. ISBN 978-0-8308-1505-0.
- J.M. Tebes, "Cyprian of Carthage: Christianity and Social World in the 3rd. century", Cuadernos de Teología 19, (2000) (in Spanish)
- Benedict XVI (2008). The Fathers. Our Sunday Visitor.
