= Massa Candida =

Saints Massa Candida
- Died: c. 258
- Martyred by: Galerius Maximus
- Means of martyrdom: Burning lime
- Venerated in: Eastern Orthodox Church; Catholic Church
- Feast: 24 August

The Massa Candida were 153 or 300 early Christian martyrs from Utica who were martyred for their refusal to offering incense to Roman idols, around AD 258. They were put to death by Galerius Maximus, the governor of the province of Africa. The title "Massa Candida" or "White Mass or Lump" refers to their manner of death. The Catholic Encyclopedia reports that they were hurled into a pit of burning lime and thus reduced to a mass of white powder. They are commemorated on 24 August.
