= Pope Cornelius =

Head of the Catholic Church from 251 to 253

Pope Saint Cornelius
- Bishop of Rome
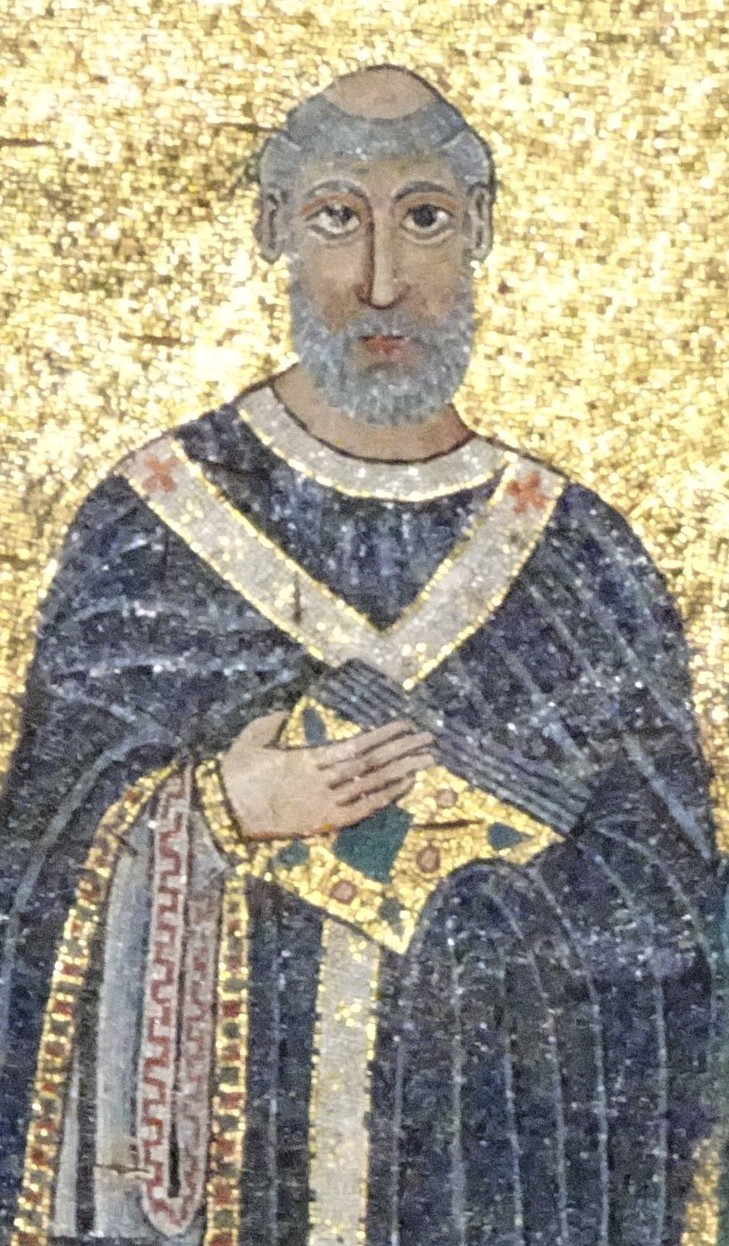
- 13th century mosaic of St. Cornelius from Santa Maria in Trastevere
- Church: Catholic Church
- Papacy began: 6 or 13 March 251
- Papacy ended: June 253
- Predecessor: Fabian
- Successor: Lucius I

Personal details
- Born: Rome, Italy, Roman Empire
- Died: June 253 Centum Cellae, Italy, Roman Empire

Sainthood
- Feast day: 16 September

Pope Cornelius (Greek: Κορνήλιος; died June 253) was the bishop of Rome from the 6th, or the 13th of March, 251 A.D., until his martyrdom in June, 253 A.D.

He was pope during and following a period of persecution of the church, while a schism occurred over how repentant church members who had practiced pagan sacrifices to protect themselves could be readmitted to the church. He agreed with Cyprian of Carthage that those who had lapsed could be restored to communion after varying forms of Reinitiation and Penance. This position was in contrast to the Novatianists, who held that those who failed to maintain their confession of faith under persecution would not be received again into communion with the church. This resulted in a short-lived schism in the Church of Rome that spread as each side sought to gather support. Cornelius held a synod that confirmed his election and excommunicated Novatian, but the controversy regarding lapsed members continued for years.

The persecutions resumed in 251 under Emperor Trebonianus Gallus. Cornelius was sent into exile and may have died from the rigours of his banishment; possibly he was beheaded.

== Christian persecution ==
Emperor Decius, who ruled from 249 to 251, persecuted Christians in the Roman Empire rather sporadically and locally, but starting in January of the year 250, he ordered all citizens to perform a religious sacrifice in the presence of commissioners, or else face death. Many Christians refused and were martyred, (including Pope Fabian on 20 January 250), while others partook in the sacrifices in order to save their own lives.

Two schools of thought arose after the persecution. One side, led by Novatian, a priest in the diocese of Rome, said those who had stopped practising Christianity during the persecution could not be accepted back into the church, even if they repented. He held that idolatry was an unpardonable sin, and that the Church had no authority to forgive apostates, but that their forgiveness must be left to God; it could not be pronounced in this world. The opposing side, including Cornelius and Cyprian of Carthage, said the lapsi could be restored to communion through repentance, demonstrated by a period of penance.

During the persecution it proved impossible to elect a successor, and the papal seat remained vacant for a year. During this period the church was governed by several priests, including Novatian. When Decius left Rome to fight the invading Goths, the Roman clergy chose a new bishop. In the fourteen months without a pope, the leading candidate, Moses, had died under the persecution. The more moderate Cornelius was unwillingly elected over Novatian and others as the twenty-first pope in March 251.

== Papacy ==
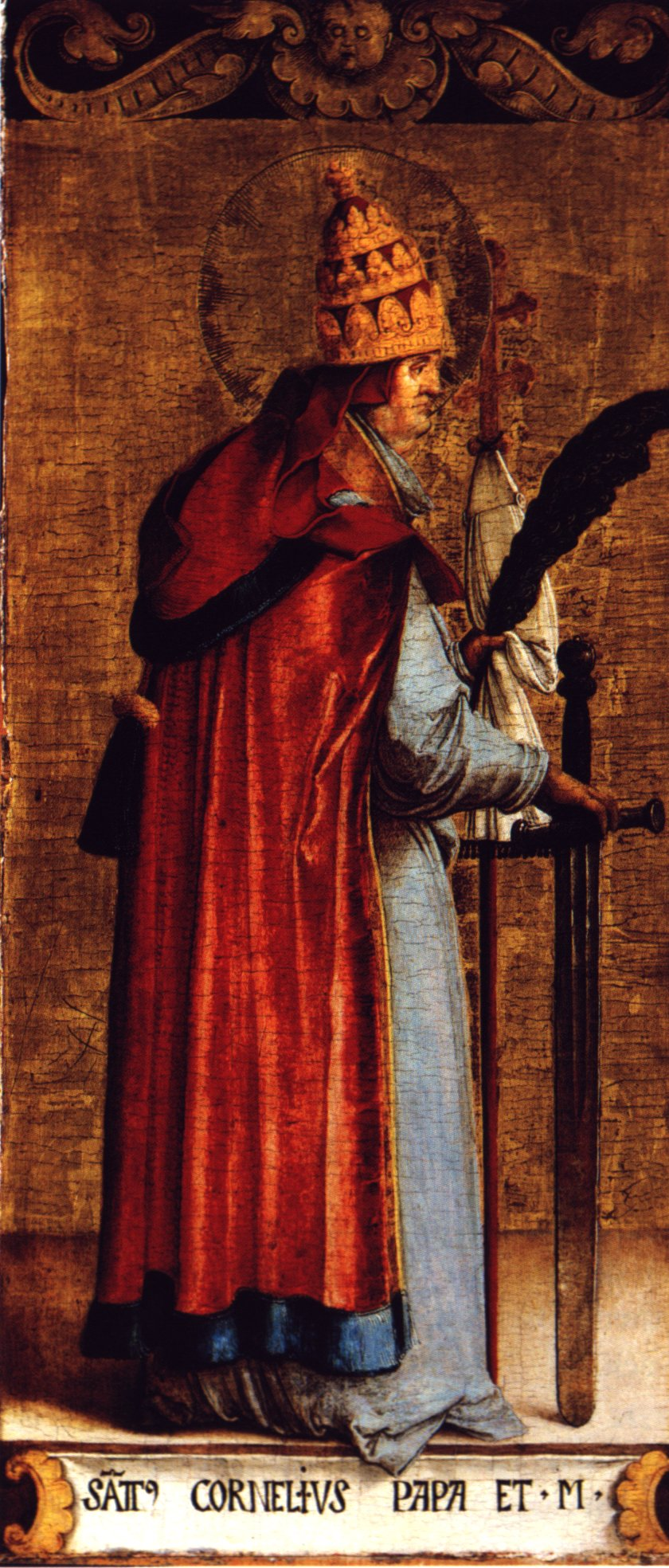
Cornelius by Master of Meßkirch

Those who supported a more rigorist position had Novatian consecrated bishop and refused to recognize Cornelius as Bishop of Rome. Both sides sent out letters to other bishops seeking recognition and support. Cornelius had the support of Cyprian, Dionysius, and most African and Eastern bishops while Novatian had the support of a minority of clergy and laymen in Rome. Cornelius's next action was to convene a synod of 60 bishops to acknowledge him as the rightful pope and the council excommunicated Novatian as well as all Novatianists. Also addressed in the synod was that Christians who stopped practising during Emperor Decius's persecution could be re-admitted into the Christian community only after doing penance.

The verdict of the synod was sent to the Christian bishops, most notably the bishop of Antioch, a fierce Novatian supporter, in order to convince him to accept Cornelius as bishop of Rome. The letters that Cornelius sent to surrounding bishops provide information of the size of the church in Rome at that time. Cornelius mentions that the Roman Church had, "forty six priests, seven deacons, seven sub-deacons, forty two acolytes, fifty two ostiarii, and over one thousand five hundred widows and persons in distress." His letters also inform that Cornelius had a staff of over 150 clergy members and the church fed over 1,500 people daily. From these numbers, it has been estimated that there were at least 50,000 Christians in Rome during the papacy of Pope Cornelius.

== Death and letters ==
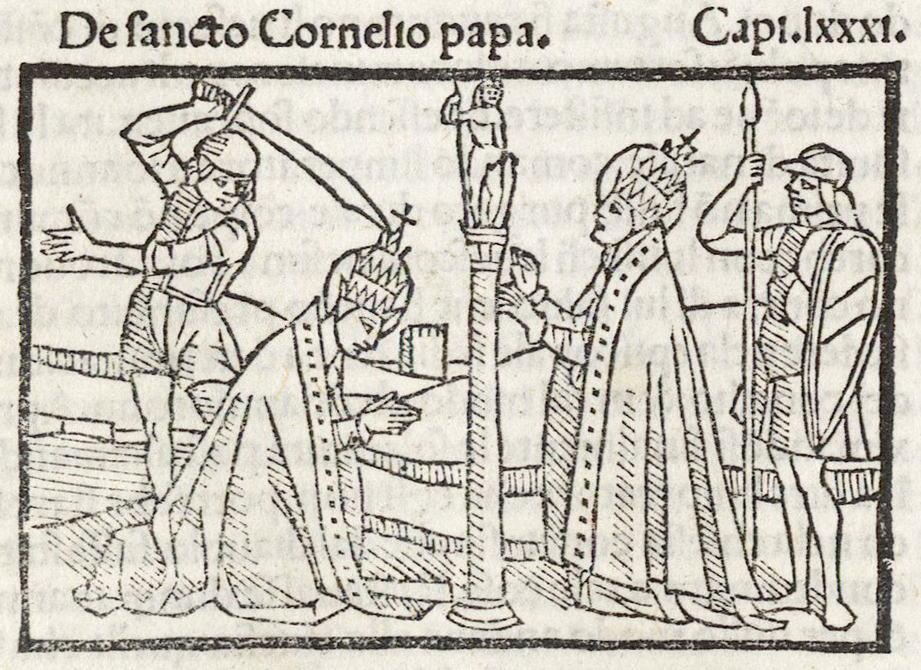
The Martyrdom of Cornelius in the Golden Legend (1497)

In June 251, Decius was killed in battle with the Goths; and persecutions resumed under his successor, Trebonianus Gallus. Cornelius was exiled to Centumcellae, Italy, where he died in June 253. The Liberian catalogue ascribes his death to the hardships of banishment; later sources say he was beheaded. He was entombed in a catacomb near the chapel of the popes, behind a Latin inscription, not Greek like his predecessor Pope Fabian and successor Lucius I. It translates to "Cornelius Martyr". The letters he sent while in exile are all written in the colloquial Latin of the period instead of the classical style used by the educated such as Cyprian, a theologian as well as a bishop, and Novatian, who was also a philosopher. This suggests that Cornelius came from a financially average family and thus was given an ordinary education as a child. One letter mentions an office of "exorcist" in the church for the first time.

== Veneration ==
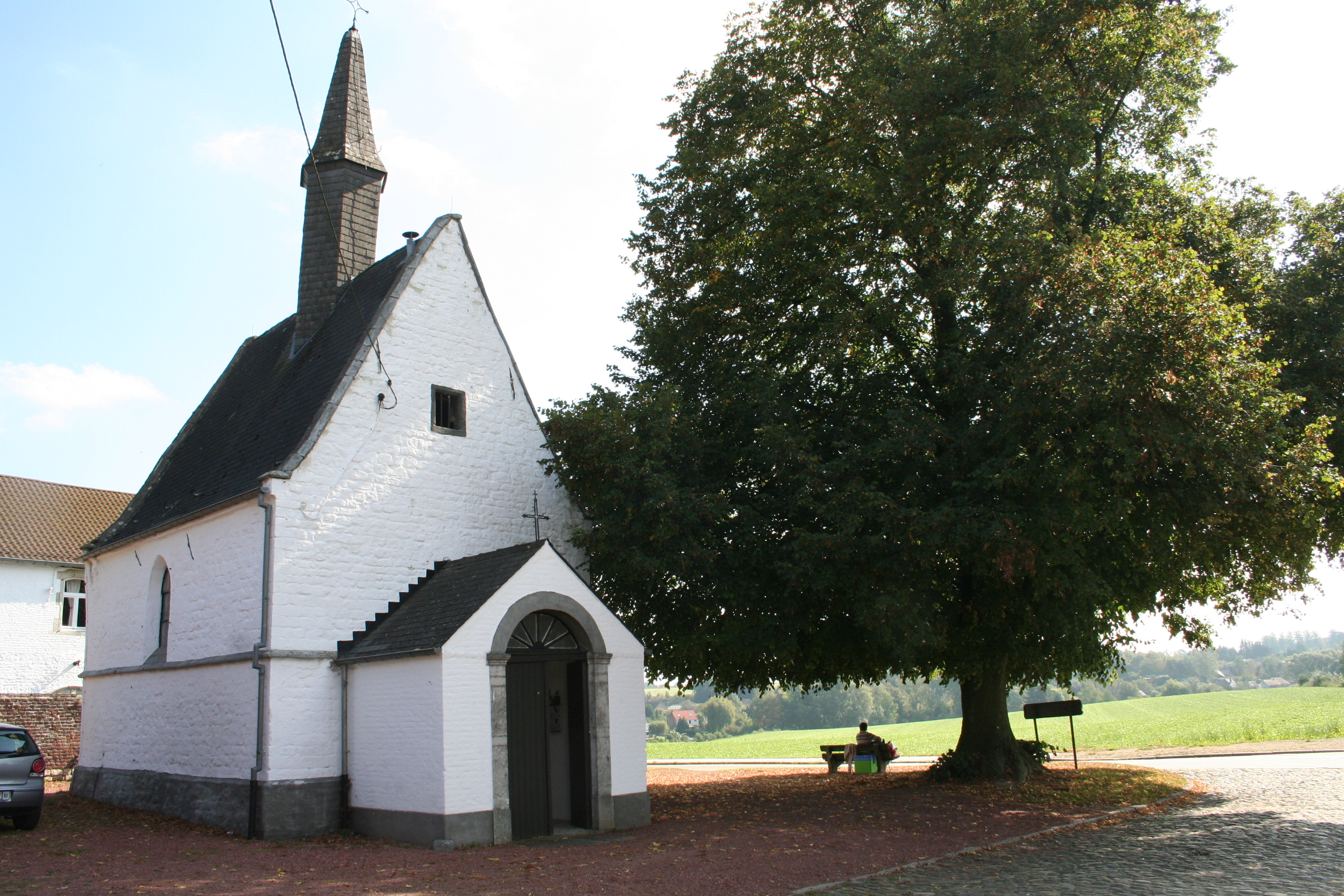
Chapel from 1460 dedicated to Cornelius, in Hamme-Mille, Belgium

Some of his relics were taken to Germany during the Middle Ages; his head was claimed by Kornelimünster Abbey near Aachen. In the Rhineland, he was also a patron saint of lovers. A legend associated with Cornelius tells of a young artist who was commissioned to decorate the Corneliuskapelle in the Selikum quarter of Neuss. The daughter of a local townsman fell in love with the artist, but her father forbade the marriage, remarking that he would only consent if the pope did as well. Miraculously, the statue of Cornelius leaned forward from the altar and blessed the pair, and the two lovers were thus married.

Cornelius, along with Quirinus of Neuss, Hubertus and Anthony the Great, was venerated as one of the Four Holy Marshals in the Rhineland during the late Middle Ages.

A legend told at Carnac states that its stones were once pagan soldiers who had been turned into stone by Cornelius, who was fleeing from them.

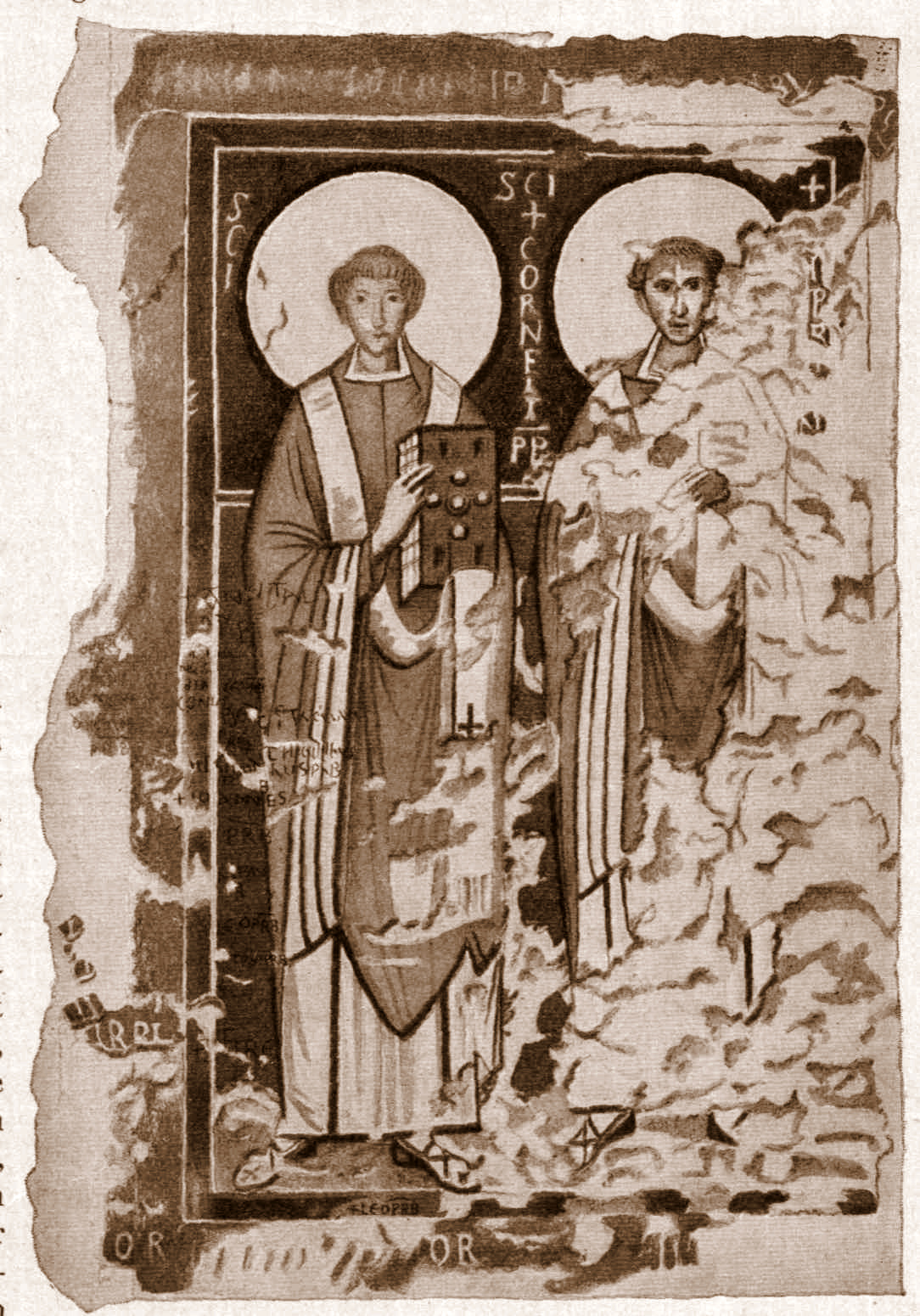
Pope Cornelius at the Catacomb of Callixtus

The Catholic Church commemorated Cornelius by venerating him, with his Saint's Day on 16 September, which he shares with his friend Cyprian. His Saint's Day was originally on 14 September, the date on which both Cyprian and Cornelius were martyred, according to Jerome. Cornelius's saintly name means "battle horn", and he is represented in icons by a pope either holding some form of cow's horn or with a cow nearby. He is the patron against earache, epilepsy, fever, twitching, and also of cattle, domestic animals, earache sufferers, epileptics, and the town of Kornelimünster, Germany, where his head is enshrined.

== See also ==
- List of popes

== Notes ==
Titles of the Great Christian Church
| Preceded by Fabian | Bishop of Rome; 251–253 | Succeeded by Lucius I |
