= Pope Marcellus I =

Head of the Catholic Church from 308 to 309

Pope Saint Marcellus I
- Bishop of Rome
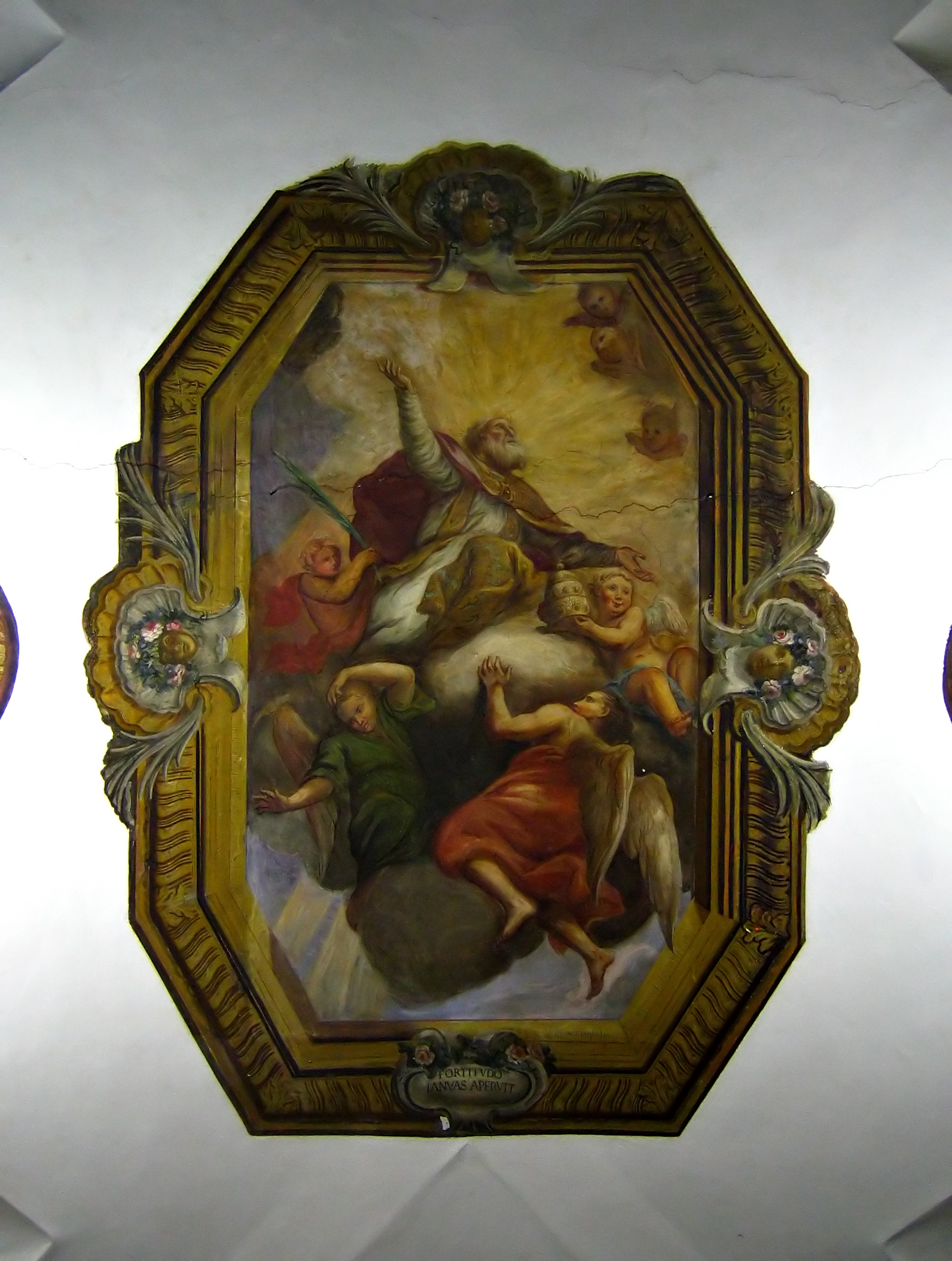
- Sacristy ceiling fresco Gloria di San Marcello by Giovanni Battista Ciocchi, San Marcello al Corso, Rome, Italy
- Church: Catholic Church
- Papacy began: 27 May 308
- Papacy ended: 16 January 309
- Predecessor: Marcellinus
- Successor: Eusebius

Personal details
- Born: 6 January 255 Rome, Italy, Roman Empire
- Died: 16 January 309 (aged 54) Rome, Italy, Roman Empire

Sainthood
- Feast day: 16 January

Pope Marcellus I (Italian: Marcello I) (6 January 255 – 16 January 309) was the bishop of Rome from May or June 308 to his death on 16 January 309. He succeeded Marcellinus after a considerable interval. Under Maxentius, he was banished from Rome in 309, on account of the tumult caused by the severity of the penances he had imposed on Christians who had lapsed under the recent persecution. He died the same year, being succeeded by Eusebius. His relics are under the altar of San Marcello al Corso in Rome. Since 1969 his feast day, traditionally kept on 16 January by the Catholic Church, is left to local calendars and is no longer inscribed in the General Roman Calendar.

== Election ==
For some time after the death of Marcellinus in 304, the Diocletian persecution continued with unabated severity. After the abdication of Diocletian in 305, and the accession in Rome of Maxentius to the throne of the Caesars in October of the following year, the Christians of the capital again enjoyed comparative peace. Nevertheless, nearly two years passed before a new bishop of Rome was elected. Then in 308, according to the Catalogus Liberianus, Marcellus first entered on his office: "He was bishop in the time of Maxentius, from the 4th consulship of Maxentius when Maximus was his colleague, until after the consulship." At Rome, Marcellus found the church in the greatest confusion. The meeting-places and some of the burial-places of the faithful had been confiscated, and the ordinary life and activity of the church was interrupted. Added to this were the dissensions within the church itself, caused by the large number of weaker members who had fallen away during the long period of active persecution and later, under the leadership of an apostate, violently demanded that they should be readmitted to communion without doing penance.

== Pontificate ==
According to the Liber Pontificalis, Marcellus divided the territorial administration of the church into twenty-five districts (tituli), appointing over each a priest, who saw to the preparation of the catechumens for baptism and directed the performance of public penances. The priest was also made responsible for the burial of the dead and for the celebrations commemorating the deaths of the martyrs. The pope also had a new burial-place, the Cœmeterium Novellœ on the Via Salaria (opposite the Catacomb of St. Priscilla), laid out. The Liber Pontificalis says: "He established a cemetery on the Via Salaria, and he appointed 25 "title" churches as jurisdictions within the city of Rome to provide baptism and penance for the many who were converted among the pagans and burial for the martyrs." At the beginning of the 7th century, there were probably twenty-five "title" churches in Rome; even granting that, perhaps, the compiler of the Liber Pontificalis referred this number to the time of Marcellus, there is still a clear historical tradition in support of his declaration that the ecclesiastical administration in Rome was reorganized by this pope after the great persecution.

The work of the pope was, however, quickly interrupted by the controversies to which the question of the readmittance of the lapsi into the church gave rise. The poetic tribute composed by Pope Damasus I in memory of his predecessor and placed over his grave (De Rossi, "Inscr. christ. urbis Romæ", II, 62, 103, 138; cf. Idem, "Roma sotterranea", II, 204–5) relates that Marcellus was looked upon as a wicked enemy by all the lapsed, because he insisted that they should perform the prescribed penance for their guilt. As a result, violent conflicts broke out; Maxentius, who had apostatized before the beginning of the persecution, had the pope seized and sent into exile. This took place at the end of 308 or the beginning of 309 according to the passages cited above from the Catalogus Liberianus, which gives the length of the pontificate as no more than one year, six (or seven) months, and twenty days. Marcellus died shortly after leaving Rome, and was venerated as a saint.

== Veneration ==
His feast day was 16 January, according to the Depositio episcoporum of the Chronography of 354 and every other Roman authority. Nevertheless, it is not known whether this is the date of his death or that of the burial of his remains, after these had been brought back from the unknown place to which he had been exiled. He was buried in the catacomb of St. Priscilla where his grave is mentioned by the itineraries to the graves of the Roman martyrs as existing in the basilica of St. Silvester (De Rossi, Roma sotterranea, I, 176).

A 5th-century "Passio Marcelli", which is included in the legendary account of the martyrdom of Cyriacus (cf. Acta Sanct., Jan., II, 10–14) and is followed by the Liber Pontificalis, gives a different account of the end of Marcellus. According to this version, the pope was required by Maxentius, who was enraged at his reorganization of the church, to lay aside his episcopal dignity and make an offering to the gods. On his refusal, he was condemned to work as a slave at a station on the public highway (catabulum). At the end of nine months he was set free by the clergy; but a matron named Lucina having had her house on the Via Lata consecrated by him as "titulus Marcelli" he was again condemned to the work of attending to the horses brought into the station, in which menial occupation he died.

All this is probably legendary; the reference to the restoration of ecclesiastical activity by Marcellus alone has a historical basis. The tradition related in the verses of Damasus seems much more worthy of belief. The feast of Saint Marcellus, whose name is to this day borne by the church at Rome mentioned in the above legend, is still celebrated on 16 January.

Theodor Mommsen theorizes that Marcellus was not really a bishop, but a simple Roman presbyter to whom was committed the ecclesiastical administration during the latter part of the period of vacancy of the papal chair. According to this view, 16 January was really the date of Marcellus' death, the next occupant of the chair being Eusebius (Neues Archiv, 1896, XXI, 350–3). The Catholic Encyclopedia dismisses this hypothesis as unsupported.

== See also ==
- List of Catholic saints
- List of popes

== Notes ==
Titles of the Great Christian Church
Preceded by Marcellinus	Bishop of Rome; 308–309	Succeeded by Eusebius
