= Novatian =

3rd-century scholar, priest, theologian and antipope

Antipope Novatian
- Church: Novatianism
- Installed: c. 251
- Term ended: c. 258
- Predecessor: Cornelius
- Successor: Roman claimant: Cornelius; Lucius I Stephen I Sixtus II; Antipapal claimant: Heraclius
- Opposed to: Pope Cornelius

Orders
- Consecration: 251

Personal details
- Born: c. 200 Rome
- Died: c. 258
- Occupation: Theologian; writer

Novatian (Greek: Νοβατιανός, Latin: Novatianus, c. 200 – c. 258) was a scholar, priest, and theologian. He is considered to have been an antipope between 251 and 258. Some Greek authors give his name as Novatus, who was an African presbyter.

He was a noted theologian and writer, the first Roman theologian who used the Latin language, at a time when there was much debate about how to deal with Christians who had lapsed and wished to return, and the issue of penance. Consecrated as pope by three bishops in 251, he adopted a more rigorous position than the established Pope Cornelius. Novatian was shortly afterwards excommunicated: the schismatic church which he established persisted for several centuries (see Novatianism).

== Life ==
Few details are known as to his life. He was a man of learning and had been trained in literary composition.

Pope Cornelius, in a letter to Fabius of Antioch, states that a catechumen called Novatian was possessed by Satan for a whole season. "A deep and settled melancholy had fastened on his mind; and the Christians who knew him said that an evil spirit had got possession of him, and that if he would profess Christ the evil spirit would go out of him; so, from a hope of recovering his health, he professed Christianity." Exorcists attended him, but he fell into a sickness from which imminent death was expected; he was, therefore, given baptism by affusion as he lay on his bed. The rest of the rites were not supplied on his recovery, nor was he confirmed by the bishop. "How then can he have received the Holy Ghost?" asked Cornelius. For his profound learning, Cornelius sarcastically defines him as "that creator of dogmas, that champion of ecclesiastical culture", but his eloquence had impressed Saint Cyprian of Carthage and Pope Fabian, who made him a priest despite the protests of the clergy that one who had been baptised only and had not been confirmed could not become a priest.

The story told by Eulogius, bishop of Alexandria, that Novatian was an archdeacon of Rome consecrated a priest by the pope in order to prevent his succeeding to the papacy, is contradicted by Cornelius and is based on a later state of affairs in which Roman deacons were statesmen rather than religious ministers.

Novatian became a leading presbyter of the Roman Church, and one of the most noted personages in the Church of the 3rd century.

== Decian persecution ==
On 20 January 250, during the Decian persecution, Pope Fabian was martyred and the persecution was so fierce that it proved impossible to elect a successor, with the papal seat remaining vacant for a year. During this period the church was governed by several priests, including Novatian. In a letter the following year, Cornelius speaks of his rival whose cowardice and love of his own life made him deny to the persecutors that he was a priest and refuse to comfort his brothers in danger. The deacons urged him to come out of hiding, but he told them that he was in love with another philosophy and thus did not want to be a priest any longer. The anonymous work Ad Novatianum (XIII) states that Novatian, "so long as he was in the one house, that is in Christ's Church, bewailed the sins of his neighbours as if they were his own, bore the burdens of the brethren, as the Apostle exhorts, and strengthened with consolation the backsliding in heavenly faith".

Novatian wrote two letters during the persecution in the name of the Roman clergy to Saint Cyprian. These letters look at the question of those who had lapsed from the faith and the Carthaginians' demands for them all to be allowed back into the church without penance. The Roman clergy agreed with Cyprian that the question had to be treated with moderation and balance by a council at the earliest possible opportunity, after the election of a new bishop. In any case, they held that they had to maintain the just church discipline that had marked the Roman church since the time of Saint Paul, without being cruel to those who were penitent. These letters use strong expressions but show that the Roman clergy did not think the readmission of lapsed Christians to communion was entirely impossible.

Novatian disagreed with this viewpoint and believed that reconciling those who had lapsed would compromise the integrity of the Church. Arguing that idolatry was an unforgivable sin and that the church had no right to readmit lapsed members to communion, Novatian argued that the church could admit the penitent to penitence-for-life, but only God could grant forgiveness. Such a position was not completely new, as Tertullian had criticised Pope Callixtus I's introduction of pardons for adultery. Even Saint Hippolytus was inclined towards severity, and laws were promulgated in many places and at various times to punish determined sinners with excommunication ending at the hour of death or even refusing them communion in the hour of death.

According to Cyprian, the gravity of this position was not in its cruelty or injustice but in the negation of the church's power in such cases to give absolution. Cyprian (Letter LXXV) conceded that Novatian affirmed the baptismal question: "Do you believe in the remission of sins and in the life eternal, through the Holy Church?" However, because Novatian refused to recognize Cornelius as the rightful successor to Peter's throne, Cyprian argued that Novatian was a schismatic; and to Cyprian, who had to contend with a comparably lenient faction in Carthage, schismatics who compromised the unity of the Church were worse than apostates.

== Papal candidacy and excommunication ==
In March 251, with the emperor Decius's death, the persecution began to subside and the Roman community seized the opportunity to nominate a successor to Fabian. Although Novatian was the pre-eminent theologian in Rome, and had a hand in running the Church after the death of Fabian, the moderate Roman aristocrat Cornelius was elected. Those who supported a more rigorist position had Novatian consecrated bishop and refused to recognize Cornelius as Bishop of Rome.

Cornelius and Novatian each sent messengers out to the churches to announce their elections and seek support. Saint Cyprian's correspondence tells of an accurate investigation carried out at the end of the Council of Carthage (251), which resulted in the whole African episcopate backing Cornelius. Even Saint Dionysius of Alexandria sided with Cornelius and with this influential support, he soon consolidated his position. However, for some time the church was divided between the two competing popes. Saint Cyprian writes that Novatian "took over" (Letter LXIX, 8) and sent new epistles to many cities to get them to accept his election. Although all the provinces and all the cities held bishops of venerable age, pure faith and proven virtue, who had been proscribed during the persecution, Cyprian writes (Letter LV, 24) that Novatian dared to replace them with new bishops he had created himself.

Meanwhile, in October 251, Cornelius had called a council of 60 bishops (probably all those from Italy and the neighbouring territories) in which Novatian was excommunicated. The bishops unable to attend added their signatures to the council's closing document, which was sent to Antioch and all the other main churches. However, Novatian still found supporters among Christians still in prison, such as Maximus, Urbanus and Nicostratus. Dionysius and Cyprian, however, wrote to them and convinced them to support Cornelius. At the beginning of the dispute between Novatian and Cornelius, it took the form of a simple question of a schism, the argument of Cyprian's first letters about Novatian (XLIV-XLVIII, 1) focusing on who was the legitimate occupant of St. Peter's throne. After a couple of months, this changed, with Cyprian (Letter LIV) finding it necessary to send his book De lapsis and letter LV to Rome, with the latter being the first document to speak of the "heresy of Novatian". Several theologians have subsequently viewed Novatian as a proto protestant.

Novatian died in 258, probably during Valerian's persecutions, in the same year as his opponent Cyprian.

== Works ==
- The Trinity, The Spectacle, Jewish Foods, In Praise of Purity, Letters, (translated by Russell J. DeSimone) Catholic University of America Press (1974).
  - The treatise on actors warns Christians not to go to the theatre or the circus.
  - The treatise on Jewish foods tells Christians they are not bound by Jewish dietary laws but cautions them against eating meat from animals slaughtered during religious rituals and later sold in butcher shops.

== See also ==
- Acesius
- Novatianism
- Papal selection before 1059
