= Galerius Maximus =

3rd century Roman senator and proconsul

Galerius Maximus was a Roman senator, who was active during the mid third century. He was suffect consul for an undetermined nundinium in the early 240s. Galerius Maximus is best known as the proconsul of Roman Africa who condemned Bishop Cyprian to death for not obeying the dictates of emperors Valerian and Gallienus and refusing to make public sacrifices. He also condemned the Massa Candida, a group of 153 or 300 Christians to death by burning for their refusal to offer incense to the Roman gods.
