= Novatianism =

Early Christian sect devoted to Novatian

Novatianism or Novationism was an early Christian sect devoted to the theologian Novatian (c. 200 – c. 258) that held a strict view that refused readmission to communion of lapsi (those baptized Christians who had denied their faith or performed the formalities of a ritual sacrifice to the pagan gods under the pressures of the persecution sanctioned by Emperor Decius in AD 250). The Church of Rome declared the Novatianists heretical following the letters that Saint Cyprian of Carthage and Ambrose wrote against them. Novatianism survived until the 8th century.

Novatian theology was heavily influenced by Tertullian, and made heavy use of his writings.

== Novatian ==
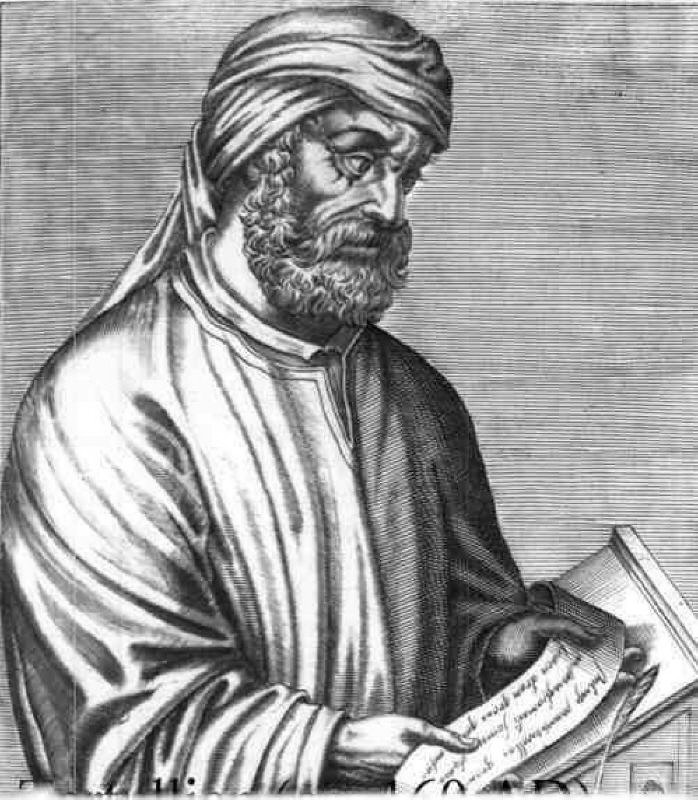
Novatianism was heavily influenced by Tertullian; the idea that the lapsi cannot be restored was also found in the views of Tertullian.

After the martyrdom of Pope Fabian during the Decian persecution, a Roman priest, Novatian, opposed the election of Pope Cornelius in 251, on the grounds that Cornelius was too liberal in accepting lapsed Christians. Novatian held that lapsed Christians, who had not maintained their confession of faith under persecution, may not be received again into communion with the church. He was consecrated bishop by three bishops of Italy and declared himself to be the true Pope. He and his followers were excommunicated by a synod held at Rome in October of the same year. Novatian is said to have suffered martyrdom under Emperor Valerian I (253–260).

Novatian should not be confused with one Novatus, a priest of Carthage, who advocated re-admitting the lapsi without an enforced penance. Cyprian of Carthage came to a position opposed to both and advocated a council be held to establish a policy under which former idolaters could be once again admitted to communion with the church.

Lardner argues that Eusebius and the Greeks in general were correct in calling the Roman presbyter Novatus, not Novatianus. He attributes the origin of the latter name to Cyprian, who called the Roman presbyter Novatianus, as being a follower of his own rebellious priest, Novatus of Carthage. Novatian in his writings defended the doctrine of the Trinity (but it differs greatly from the Nicene Creed, that was later accepted by the Church), argued that the Old Testament prohibitions on meats must be understood spiritually, condemned Christians who attend public games and praised chastity. Novatian was heavily influenced by the works of Tertullian.

== Beliefs ==
=== Lapsi ===
Novatian believed that the lapsi should not be let back into the church. He believed that the lapsi might repent and be put to lifelong penance, but the forgiveness must be left to God, and that the lapsi could not be forgiven on this earth.

Novatians cited the Book of Hebrews to support this idea.

=== God ===
Novatian was a trinitarian. In his teachings, however, subordinationism and the unity of God as God the Father, not three, play an important role. Novatian's writings defended the Father as the creator of the world to combat the teachings of the Gnostics. Novatian also defended the unity of the godhead and humanity in Jesus, and wrote about a distinction between the Son and the Father, to combat Marcionites, Modalists and Adoptionists. Novatian believed that the role of the Holy Spirit was solely to be the source of blessings given during Baptism.

=== The Church ===
Unlike Cyprian, Novatian believed that being inside the church is not a requirement for salvation, but that the church is a congregation of saints, and if sinners would be let inside the church, it would endanger the church. Novatians always had a successor of Novatian in Rome (where Novatian was from) and they used the episcopal polity.

=== Other ===
According to Theodoret, the Novatians did not use confirmation, and according to Eulugius, Novatians did not either venerate martyrs. Novatians forbade remarriage. Christologically Novatian was probably orthodox, however some suggest he had similarities to the later Nestorians, though this view has been criticized.

By the 4th century, Novatians had also adopted monasticism.

Some Novatians were Quartodecimans.

=== Baptism ===
Augustine writes that the Novatians would rebaptize people who came from the Catholic Church. Some have argued that the Novatians did not baptize infants, though the stance of the Novatians is disputed and the arguments that Novatians were credobaptist is founded on somewhat weak evidence, and by this point infant baptism had become common and clear among the orthodox writers.

== After Novatian ==
Novatian's strict views existed before him and may be found in The Shepherd of Hermas. After his death, the Novatianist sect spread rapidly and could be found in every province and were very numerous in some places. Those who allied themselves with his doctrines were called Novatianists, but they called themselves καθαροι (katharoi) or "Purists" (not to be confused with the later Cathars) to reflect their desire not to be identified with what they considered the lax practices of a corrupted and what was hitherto a universal Church.

While Novatian had refused absolution to the lapsi (those who had renounced their Christianity under persecution but later wanted to return to the church), his followers extended the doctrine to include all mortal sins (idolatry, murder, and adultery, or fornication). Most of them forbade second marriage. They always had a successor of Novatian at Rome and were everywhere governed by bishops.

Because Novatianists (including Novatian) did not submit to the Catholic bishop of Rome, they were labeled by Roman Catholics as schismatics. Additionally, Roman Catholics also labeled Novatianists heretics for denying that the Church had the power to grant absolution in certain cases (such as to the lapsi).

In the 4th and 5th centuries, the Donatist sect in Africa Proconsulare maintained a similar belief about Christians who had lapsed under the pressures of persecution; they too were declared heretics.

Some Novatians blended with the Montanists.

== See also ==
- Antipope
- Donatist
- James L. Papandrea

== Sources ==
- Vogt, HJ (1968). Coetus Sanctorum. Der Kirchenbegriff des Novatian und die Geschichte seiner Sonderkirche. Bonn..
- Papandrea, JL (2008). The Trinitarian Theology of Novatian of Rome: A Study in Third-Century Orthodoxy. Lewiston, NJ..
