= Chronological list of saints in the 2nd century =

A list of people, who died during the 2nd century, who have received recognition as Saints (through canonization) from the Catholic Church:

Name	Birth	Birthplace	Death	Place of death	Notes
Sarbel and Barbe			101		
Phocas			102		Bishop of Sinope
Evaristus		Bethlehem, Palestine	105	Rome, Roman Empire	Bishop of Rome
Zachary			106		Bishop of Vienne
Charbel			107		
Eudokia of Heliopolis			107		
Ignatius of Antioch	35		107	Rome, Roman Empire	Patriarch of Antioch
Rufus and Zosimus			107	Rome, Roman Empire	
Simeon of Jerusalem		Galilee	107	Jerusalem, Iudaea Province	Patriarch of Jerusalem
Hyacinth			108	Caesarea, Cappadocia	chamberlain to emperor Trajan
Antiochus of Sulcis			110		
Zosimus			110		
Eleuchadius			112		Bishop of Ravenna
Publius	33	Malta	112	Athens, Greece	legendary bishop of Malta
Romulus			112		
Flavius Latinus of Brescia			115		Bishop of Brescia
Quirinus of Neuss			116		
Zacchaeus of Jerusalem			116		Bishop of Jerusalem
Astius			117		Bishop of Dyrrachium
Hermione of Ephesus			117		
Maurus, Pantalemon and Sergius			117	Bisceglie, Apulia	
Thecla			117		
Eustace			118		
Terentian			118		Bishop of Todi
Pope Alexander I		Rome, Roman Empire	119	Rome, Roman Empire	
Secundus of Asti			119		
Seraphia		Rome, Roman Empire	119	Rome, Roman Empire	
Getulius and companions		Gabii, Roman Empire	120	Gabii, Roman Empire	
Marcian of Tortona			120		
Matthias of Jerusalem			120		Bishop of Jerusalem
Symphorosa and her seven sons			120		
Theodora			120		
Faustinus and Jovita		Brescia, Roman Empire	121	Brescia, Roman Empire	
Philetus and companions			121	Illyria	
Sixtus I		Rome, Roman Empire	125	Rome, Roman Empire	Bishop of Rome
Thamel and Companions			125		
Exuperius and Zoe			127		
Sabina		Rome, Roman Empire	127	Rome, Roman Empire	
Quadratus of Athens			129		Bishop of Athens
Ariadne of Phrygia			130		
Auspicius			130		Bishop of Trier
Balbina			130	Rome, Roman Empire	
Calocerus			130		Bishop of Ravenna
Crescentian			130	Sardinia	
Papias			130	Smyrna	Bishop of Hierapolis
Theodore and Pausilippus			130	Byzantium	
Hermes			132	Rome, Roman Empire	
Juvenal of Benevento		Narni, Italy	132		
Judas Cyriacus			133		Bishop of Ancona
Ovidius		Sicily	135		
Herodion of Antioch			136		Bishop of Antioch
Castritian			137	Milan, Roman Empire	Bishop of Milan
Telesphorus		Greece	137	Rome, Roman Empire	Bishop of Rome
Corebus			138		
Eleutherius and Anthia			138		Bishop of Illyria and his mother
Oliva of Brescia			138		
Peregrinus			138		Bishop of Terni
Marina	119		139		
Hyginus		Athens, Greece	140	Rome, Roman Empire	Bishop of Rome
Julian of Sora		Dalmatia	150	Sora, Campania, Italy	
Paternus of Auch		Bilbao, Spain	150	Auch, France	Bishop of Auch
Patiens			150		Bishop of Metz
Philo and Agathopodes			150		
Novatus		Rome, Roman Empire	151		
Pius I		Aquileia, Roman Empire	154	Rome, Roman Empire	Bishop of Rome
Germanicus of Smyrna			155	Smyrna	
Polycarp	69		155	Smyrna	Bishop of Smyrna
Melissa	126	Brescia	157	Marcianopolis	Legendary virgin and martyr
Felicitas of Rome and her seven sons	101	Rome, Roman Empire	165	Rome, Roman Empire	
Ptolemaeus and Lucius			165	Rome, Roman Empire	
Justin Martyr	100	Flavia Neapolis	165	Rome, Roman Empire	
Abercius of Hieropolis			167		Bishop of Hierapolis
Pope Anicetus		Emesa, Syria	167	Rome, Roman Empire	Bishop of Rome
Daniel of Padua			168		
Pontianus (Pontian)			169	Spoleto, Roman Empire	
Constantius of Perugia			170		Bishop of Perugia
Hermias			170	Comana, Cappadocia	
Severinus, Exuperius, and Felician			170	Vienne, Gaul	
Thraseas			170	Smyrna	Bishop of Eumeneia, Phrygia
Dionysius			171	Corinth, Greece	Bishop of Corinth
Apollinaris Claudius			175		Bishop of Hierapolis
Sagar of Laodicea			175		Bishop of Laodicea
Speusippus, Eleusippus, and Melapsippus			175		
Victor and Corona			176		
Alexander			177	Lyons, Gaul	
Blandina		Lyons, Gaul	177	Lyons, Gaul	
Glyceria			177	Heraclea, Propontis	
Pothinus	87		177	Lyons, Gaul	Bishop of Lyon
Martyrs of Lyons			177	Lyons, Gaul	
Pope Soter		Fondi, Roman Empire	177	Rome, Roman Empire	Bishop of Rome
Epipodius and Alexander			178		
Concordius		Rome, Roman Empire	178	Spoleto, Roman Empire	
Symphorianus			178		
Hegesippus	110		180	Jerusalem, Palaestina	
Herculanils			180	Porto, Roman Empire	
Leucius			180		Bishop of Brindisi
Melito of Sardis			180		Bishop of Sardis
Philip of Gortyna			180		Bishop of Gortyna
Pinytus			180		Bishop of Knossos, Crete
Scillitan Martyrs			180	Scillium, Africa Province	
Theophilus of Antioch			181		Bishop of Antioch
Antoninus			186		
Apollonius the Apologist		Rome, Roman Empire	186	Rome, Roman Empire	
Pope Eleuterus		Nicopolis, Greece	189	Rome, Roman Empire	Bishop of Rome
Dathus			190		Bishop of Ravenna
Faustus of Milan			190	Milan, Roman Empire	
Julius of Rome		Rome, Roman Empire	190	Rome, Roman Empire	
Dionysius of Vienne			193		Bishop of Vienne
Serapion of Macedonia			195	Macedonia	
Theophilus of Caesarea			195		Bishop of Caesarea
Victor I		Africa Province	199	Rome, Roman Empire	Bishop of Rome
Liberius of Ravenna			200		Bishop of Ravenna
Pantaenus			200		

== See also ==
- Christianity in the 2nd century
- Apostolic Fathers
- List of Church Fathers
