= July 3 (Eastern Orthodox liturgics) =

Day in the Eastern Orthodox liturgical calendar

Eastern Orthodox liturgical calendar
July 2	July 3	July 4
July 3 O.S. ≍ July 16 N.S. July 3 N.S ≍ June 20 O.S.

An Eastern Orthodox cross

July 3 in Eastern Orthodox liturgical calendars is a feast day and a day of commemoration of saints and martyrs. Although some Orthodox churches use the Revised Julian Calendar and others use the traditional Julian calendar, the fixed commemorations for their respective July 3 are broadly the same, no matter which calendar is used. (Note: Despite the dates being the same, the days to which they refer typically differ by 13 days. The notation Old Style or O.S. is sometimes used to indicate a date in the traditional Julian Calendar (the "Old Calendar"). The notation New Style or N.S. indicates a date in the Revised Julian calendar (the "New Calendar").)

== Saints ==
- Martyr Hyacinth the Cubicularius, of Caesarea in Cappadocia (108) (Note: "At Caesarea, in Cappadocia, St. Hyacinthus, chamberlain of the emperor Trajan. Accused of being a Christian, he was scourged and thrown into prison, where, consumed with hunger, he breathed his last.") (Note: Name days celebrated today include: Hyacinth; Yakinthos; Jacinthus (Ὑάκινθος); Hyacinthe (Ὑακίνθη).)

- Martyrs Theodotus and Theodota, martyred with St. Hyacinth at Caesarea in Cappadocia (108)
- Martyrs Diomedes, Eulampius, Asclepiodotus, and Golinduc, who suffered with Saint Hyacinth (108)

- Saint Anatolius of Laodicea, Bishop of Laodicea, and his successor, St. Eusebius (3rd century) (Note: "At Laodicea, in Syria, St. Anatolius, a bishop, whose writings were admired not only by religious men, but even by philosophers.")
- Martyrs Mark and Mocius (4th century) (Note: "The same day, the holy martyrs Mark and Mucian, who were put to the sword for Christ. As a small boy cried out to them not to sacrifice to idols, he was whipped, but confessing Christ all the more vigorously, he was killed with a man named Paul, who had also exhorted the martyrs.")
- Saint Alexander, founder of the Monastery of the Unsleeping Ones ("the Ever-Vigilant"), Constantinople (c. 430) (see also: January 15, February 23)
- Saint Anatolius, Patriarch of Constantinople (458)
- Saint Isaias the Solitary, of Scetis and Palestine (491)
- Saint Symeon the Stylite (the third stylite), of Cilicia (6th century)
- Martyr Theodota (712)

== Pre-Schism Western saints ==
- Saint Dathus (Datus), Bishop of Ravenna in Italy (190) (Note: His election was due to the miraculous appearance of a dove hovering over his head.) (Note: "At Ravenna, St. Dathus, bishop and confessor.")
- Saints Irenaeus, a deacon, and Mustiola, a noble lady, martyred in Chiusi in Tuscany in Italy under Aurelian for ministering to other martyrs and burying their relics (273) (Note: "At Chiusi, in Tuscany, in the reign of the emperor Trajan, the holy martyrs Irenaeus, deacon, and Mustiola, a matron, who were subjected to various atrocious tortures and merited the crown of martyrdom.")
- Saint Heliodorus of Altino, first bishop of Altinum (Altino) (c. 390) (Note: Born in Dalmatia, he helped translate the Vulgate. Later he settled in Aquileia in Italy and became Bishop of Altinum (Altino), a small town since destroyed, near Venice. He was a brave opponent of Arianism.) (Note: "At Altino, St. Heliodorus, a bishop distinguished for holiness and learning.")
- St. Byblig of Carnarvon (Biblig, Peblig, Piblig, Publicius), Gwynedd, in Wales.
- Saint Germanus, Bishop of the Isle of Man and Enlightener of Peel, nephew of St. Patrick of Ireland (474) (Note: By tradition a nephew of St Patrick and a monk in Ireland, Wales and Brittany. Eventually he went to the Isle of Man as a bishop. His memory is still kept here in several place-names in the forms 'Germain' and 'Jarman'.)
- St. Bladus (Baldus), an early Bishop of the Isle of Man.
- Saint Gunthiern, a prince in Wales who went to Brittany and lived as a hermit (c. 500) (Note: "GUNTHIERN was one of the sovereign princes of Wales, but quitted his earthly estate to seek perfection in a life of solitude. He first fixed his residence in the Isle of Croix, on the coast of Brittany, and there remained for a length of time, until the fame of his virtues and miracles reached the ears of the king of the country. This prince induced the Saint to transfer his abode to the mainland, and gave him a plot of ground for his hermitage. His chief residence in the latter years of his life seems to have been at Quimperlé, where an abbey was built in the tenth century. There St. Gunthiern is supposed to have passed to his everlasting crown; but his body, probably from fear of the Norman pirates, was removed to his island of Croix, and once more - in the middle of the eleventh century - solemnly translated to Quimperlé. His solemn commemoration, which fell on the day of SS. Peter and Paul, was transferred to the 3rd July.")
- Saint Leo II, Pope of Rome (683) (Note: Born in Sicily, he became Pope of Rome in 681, during the Byzantine Papacy. During his papacy, the former Pope Honorius I was condemned for not denouncing Monothelitism.)
- Saint Cilléne Droichtech, Abbot of Iona (c. 752)
- Saint Guthagon, born in Ireland, he crossed to Belgium and became a hermit (8th century)

== Post-Schism Orthodox saints ==
- Saint George the Godbearer, of the Black Mountain, teacher of St. George of Mount Athos (1068)
- Saint Basil the Bishop of Ryazan (1295) (Note: See also: (in Russian) Василий I (епископ Рязанский). Википедии. (Russian Wikipedia).)
- Venerable Anatolius, recluse, of the Near Caves in Kiev (12th century) (Note: See also: (in Russian) Анатолий Затворник. Википедии. (Russian Wikipedia).)
- Venerable Anatolius, recluse, of the Far Caves in Kiev (13th century)
- Saints Basil (1249) and Constantine (1257), holy princes of Yaroslavl (13th century)
- Saint Basil (Kalika or Koleka), Archbishop of Novgorod (1352)
- Saints John and Longinus, Wonderworkers of Yarensk, Solovki (1544-1545)
- Blessed John of Moscow, Fool-for-Christ (1589)
- Venerable Nicodemus of Khozyuga (Kozhe Lake), monk of Kozhaezersk Monastery (1640)
- Blessed Michael, Herodion, Basil, and Thomas, Fools-for-Christ, of Solvychegodsk (17th century)
- Saint Joachim the New Godbeaerer, of Notenon Monastery in Achaia (17th century)
- Saint Euphrosine (Viaziemska) of Kolupanovo, Aleksin, Fool-for-Christ (1855)

=== New martyrs and confessors ===
- New Monk-martyr Gerasimus the New, of Carpenision, at Constantinople (1812)
- New Hieromartyr Anthony (Bystrov), Archbishop of Arkhangelsk and Kholmogorsk (1931) (Note: See also: (in Russian) Антоний (Быстров). Википедии. (Russian Wikipedia).)

== Other commemorations ==
- Icon of the Mother of God the "Milk-Giver" (Galaktotrophousa), of the Hilandar Monastery on Mount Athos.
- Second translation (1652) of the relics of Hieromartyr Philip, Metropolitan of Moscow and all Russia (1569)
- Uncovering of the relics (1959) of Hieromartyr Raphael of Lesbos (1463), in Mytilene.
- Uncovering of the relics (2005) of Sylvester (Olshevsky), Bishop of Omsk (1920) (Note: See also: (in Russian) Сильвестр (Ольшевский). Википедии. (Russian Wikipedia).) (see also: February 25)
- Repose of Nun Euphrosyne "the Unknown," of Kolyupanovo, Aleksin (1855)

== Icon gallery ==
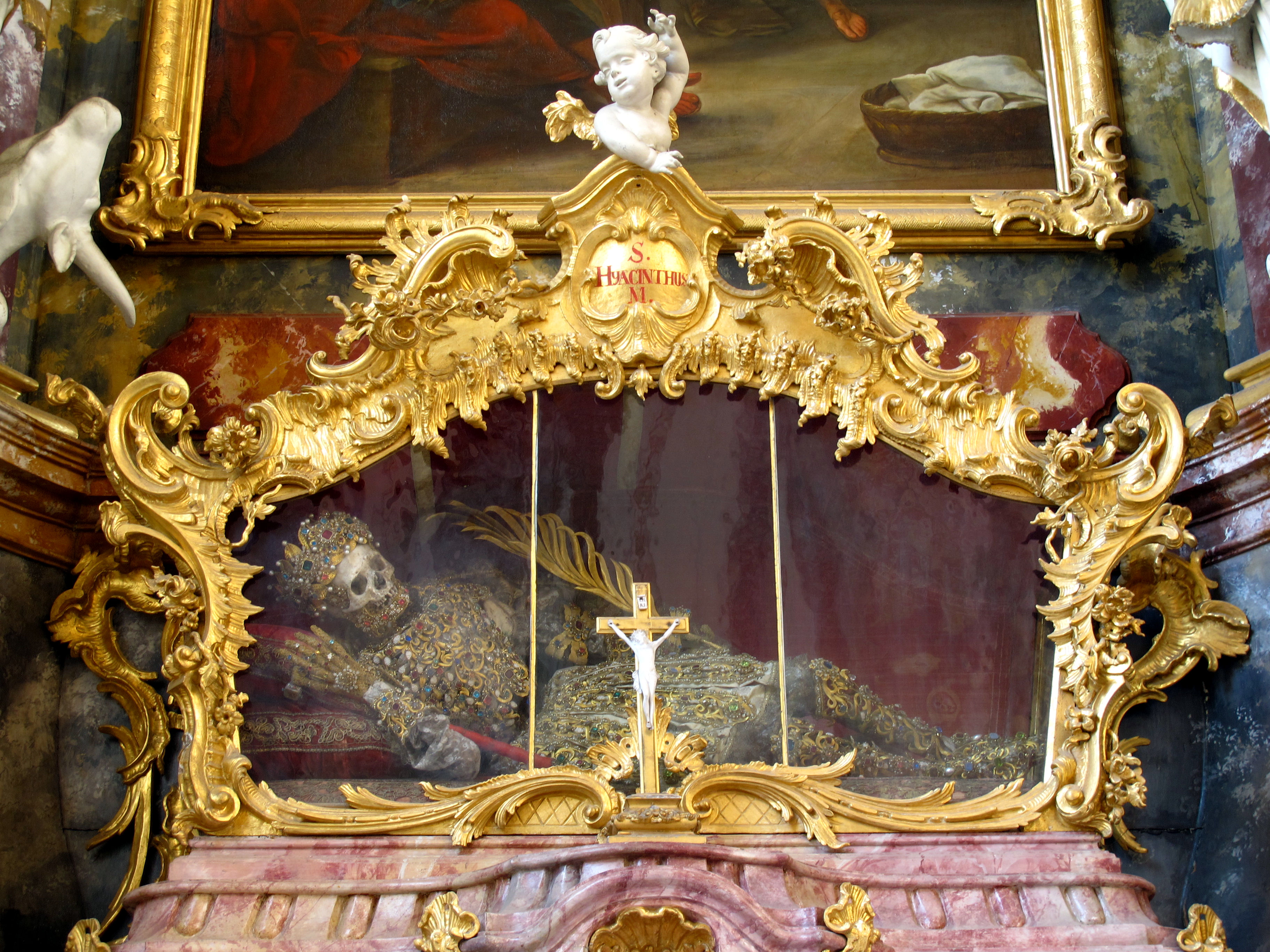
Relics of St. Hyacinth of Caesarea.

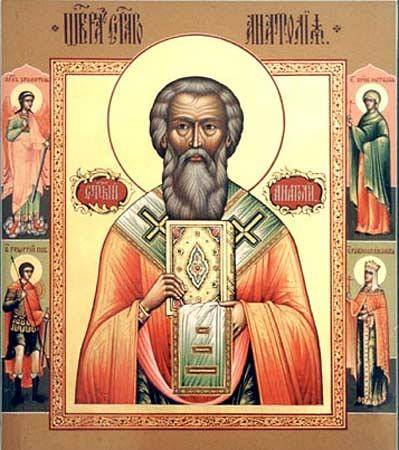
St. Anatolius, Patriarch of Constantinople.

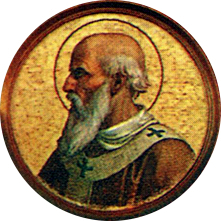
St. Leo II, Pope of Rome.

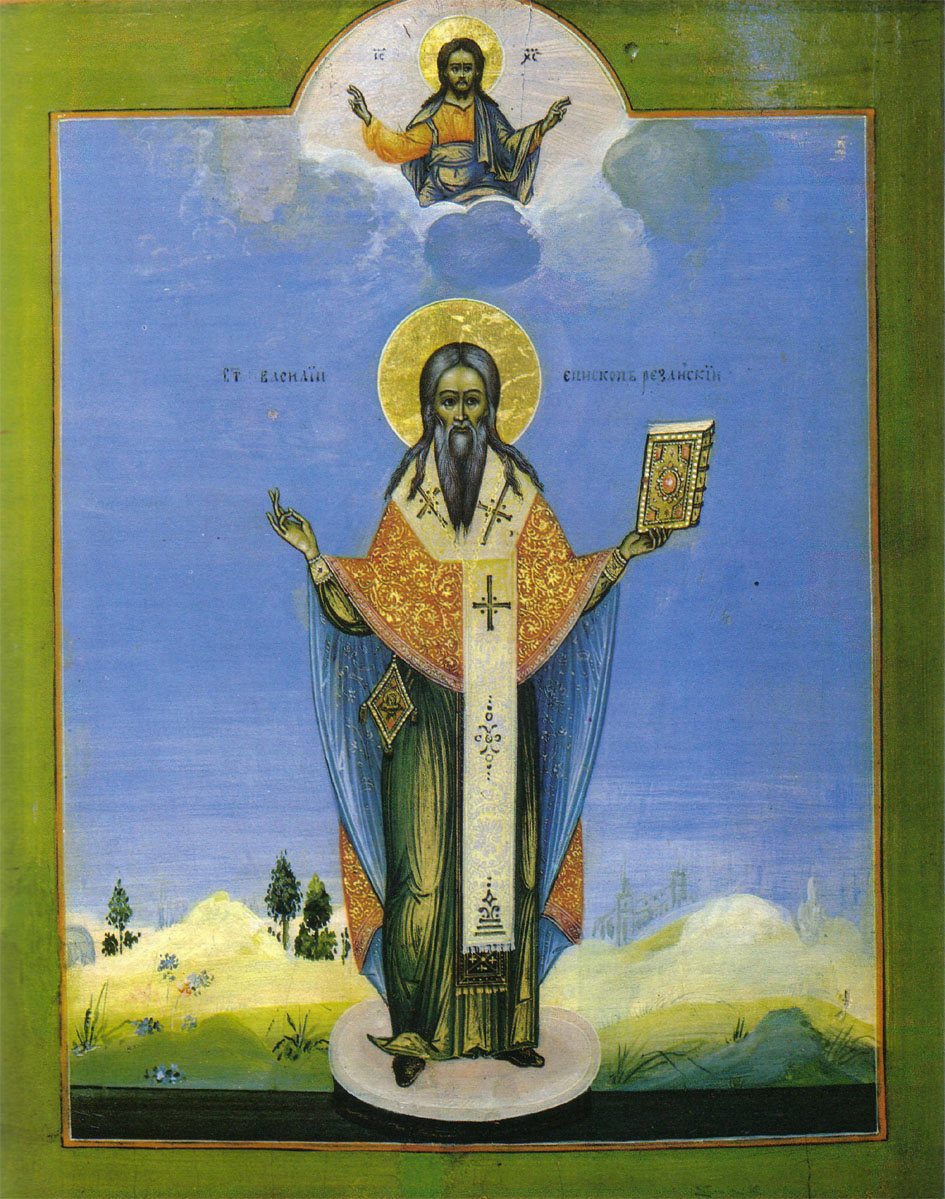
St. Basil the Bishop of Ryazan.

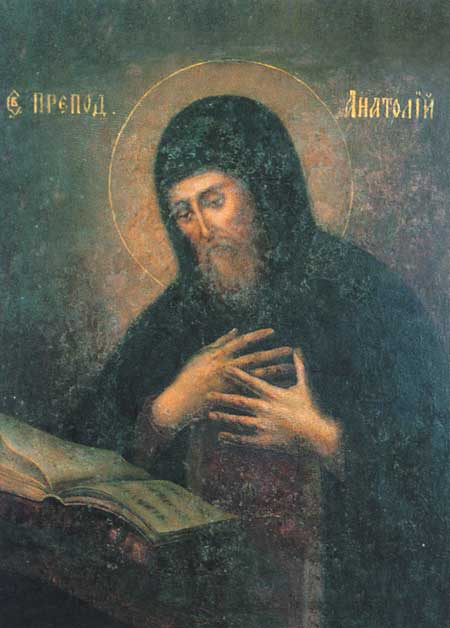
Venerable Anatolius, recluse, of the Near Caves in Kiev.

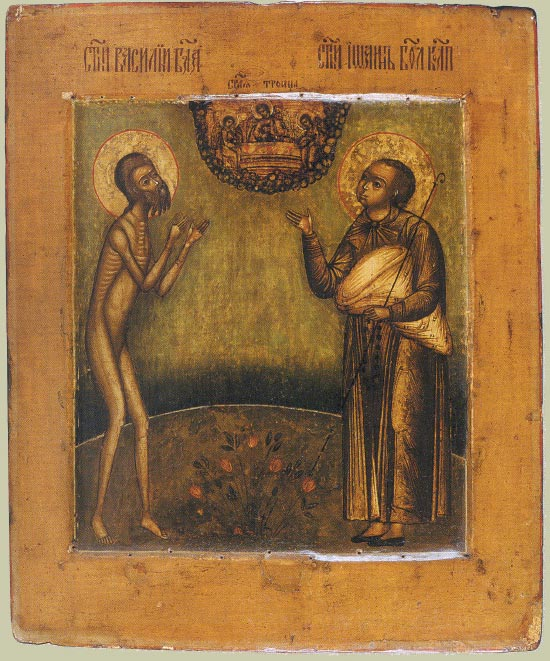
Blessed John of Moscow, Fool-for-Christ (right).

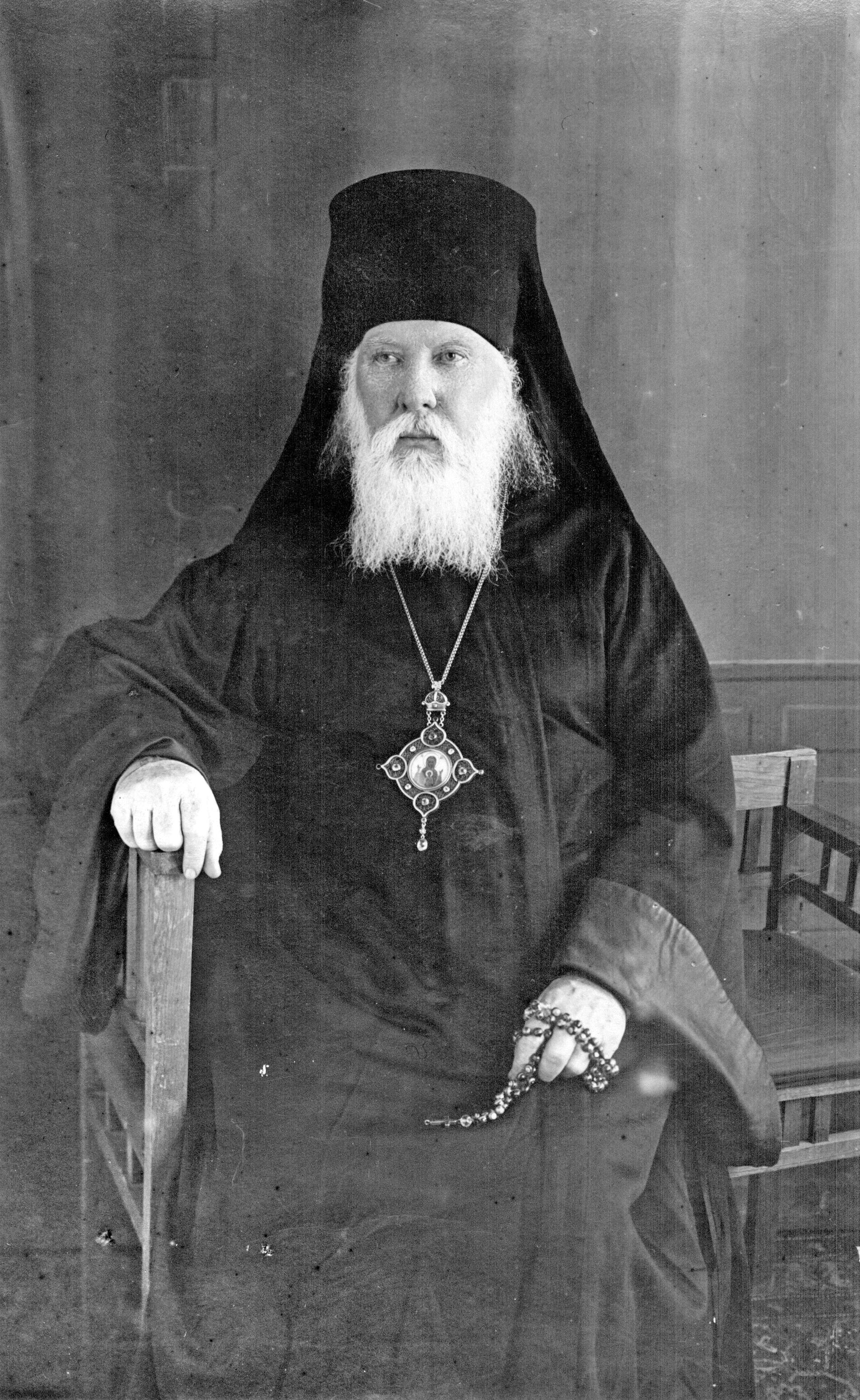
New Hieromartyr Anthony (Bystrov), Archbishop of Arkhangelsk and Kholmogorsk.

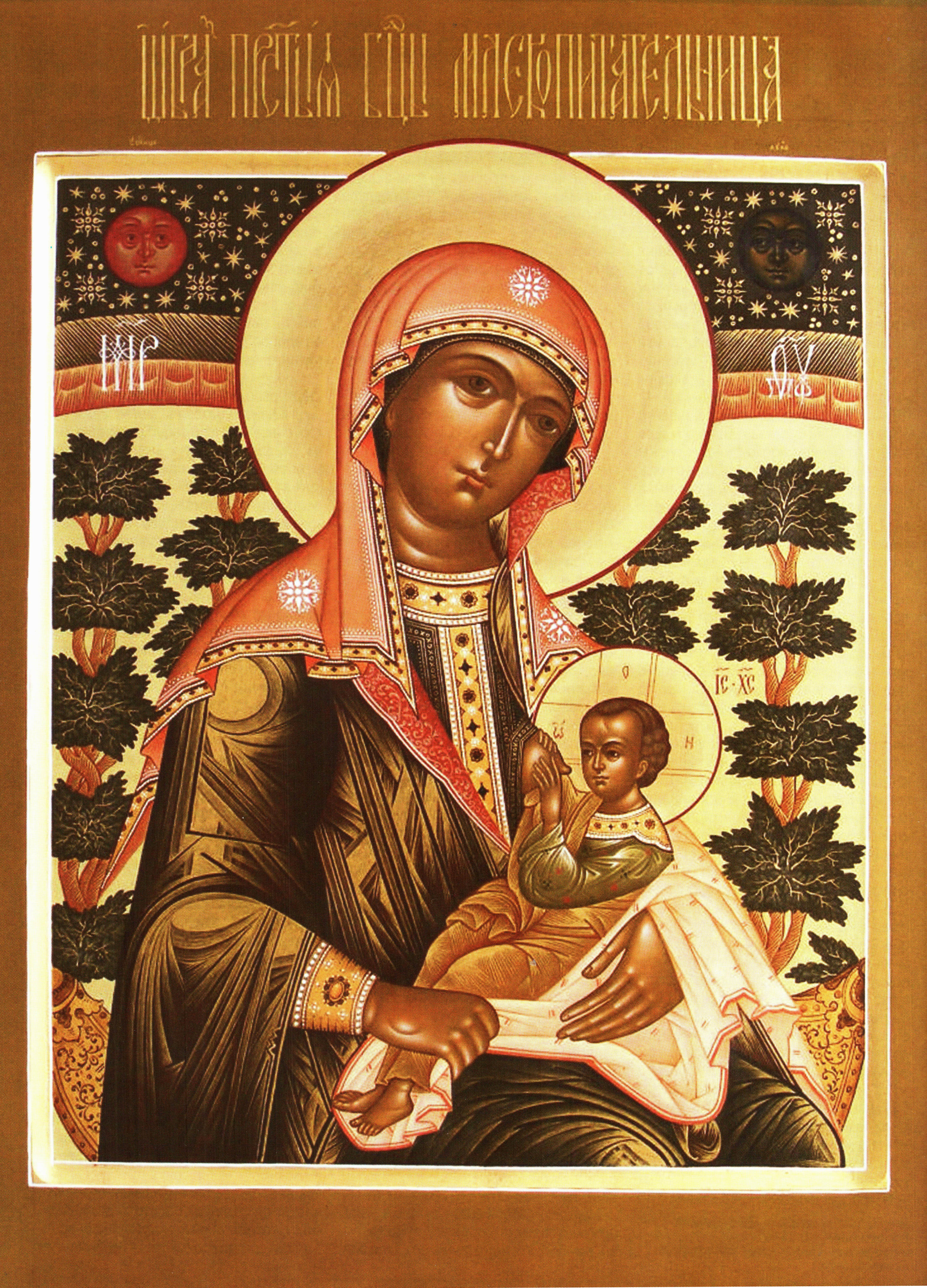
Icon of the Mother of God the "Milk-Giver" (Galaktotrophousa).

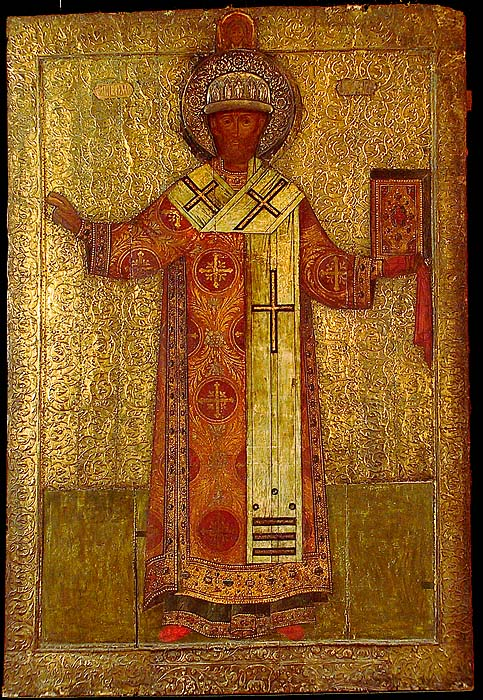
Hieromartyr Philip, Metropolitan of Moscow and all Russia.

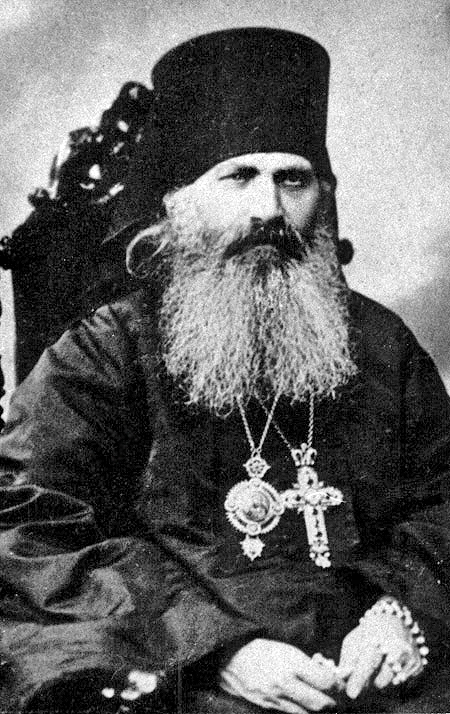
St. Sylvester (Olshevsky), Bishop of Omsk.

== Sources ==
- July 3/July 16. Orthodox Calendar (PRAVOSLAVIE.RU).
- July 16 / July 3. HOLY TRINITY RUSSIAN ORTHODOX CHURCH (A parish of the Patriarchate of Moscow).
- July 3. OCA - The Lives of the Saints.
- July 3. The Year of Our Salvation - Holy Transfiguration Monastery, Brookline, Massachusetts.
- The Autonomous Orthodox Metropolia of Western Europe and the Americas (ROCOR). St. Hilarion Calendar of Saints for the year of our Lord 2004. St. Hilarion Press (Austin, TX). p. 49.
- The Third Day of the Month of July. Orthodoxy in China.
- July 3. Latin Saints of the Orthodox Patriarchate of Rome.
- The Roman Martyrology. Transl. by the Archbishop of Baltimore. Last Edition, According to the Copy Printed at Rome in 1914. Revised Edition, with the Imprimatur of His Eminence Cardinal Gibbons. Baltimore: John Murphy Company, 1916. pp. 193–194.
- Rev. Richard Stanton. A Menology of England and Wales, or, Brief Memorials of the Ancient British and English Saints Arranged According to the Calendar, Together with the Martyrs of the 16th and 17th Centuries. London: Burns & Oates, 1892. pp. 305–306.

Greek Sources

- Great Synaxaristes: (in Greek) 3 ΙΟΥΛΙΟΥ. ΜΕΓΑΣ ΣΥΝΑΞΑΡΙΣΤΗΣ.
- (in Greek) Συναξαριστής. 3 Ιουλίου. ECCLESIA.GR. (H ΕΚΚΛΗΣΙΑ ΤΗΣ ΕΛΛΑΔΟΣ).
- (in Greek) ΙΟΥΛΙΟΣ. Αποστολική Διακονία της Εκκλησίας της Ελλάδος (Apostoliki Diakonia of the Church of Greece).
- (in Greek) 03/07/2018. Ορθόδοξος Συναξαριστής.

Russian Sources

- (in Russian) 16 июля (3 июля). Православная Энциклопедия под редакцией Патриарха Московского и всея Руси Кирилла (электронная версия). (Orthodox Encyclopedia - Pravenc.ru).
- (in Russian) 3 июля по старому стилю / 16 июля по новому стилю. Русская Православная Церковь - Православный церковный календарь на 2017 год.
- (in Russian) 3 июля (ст.ст.) 16 июля 2014 (нов. ст.). Русская Православная Церковь Отдел внешних церковных связей. (DECR).
