= Theodorus (archbishop of Ravenna) =

7th-century archbishop of Ravenna

Theodorus Archbishop of Ravenna
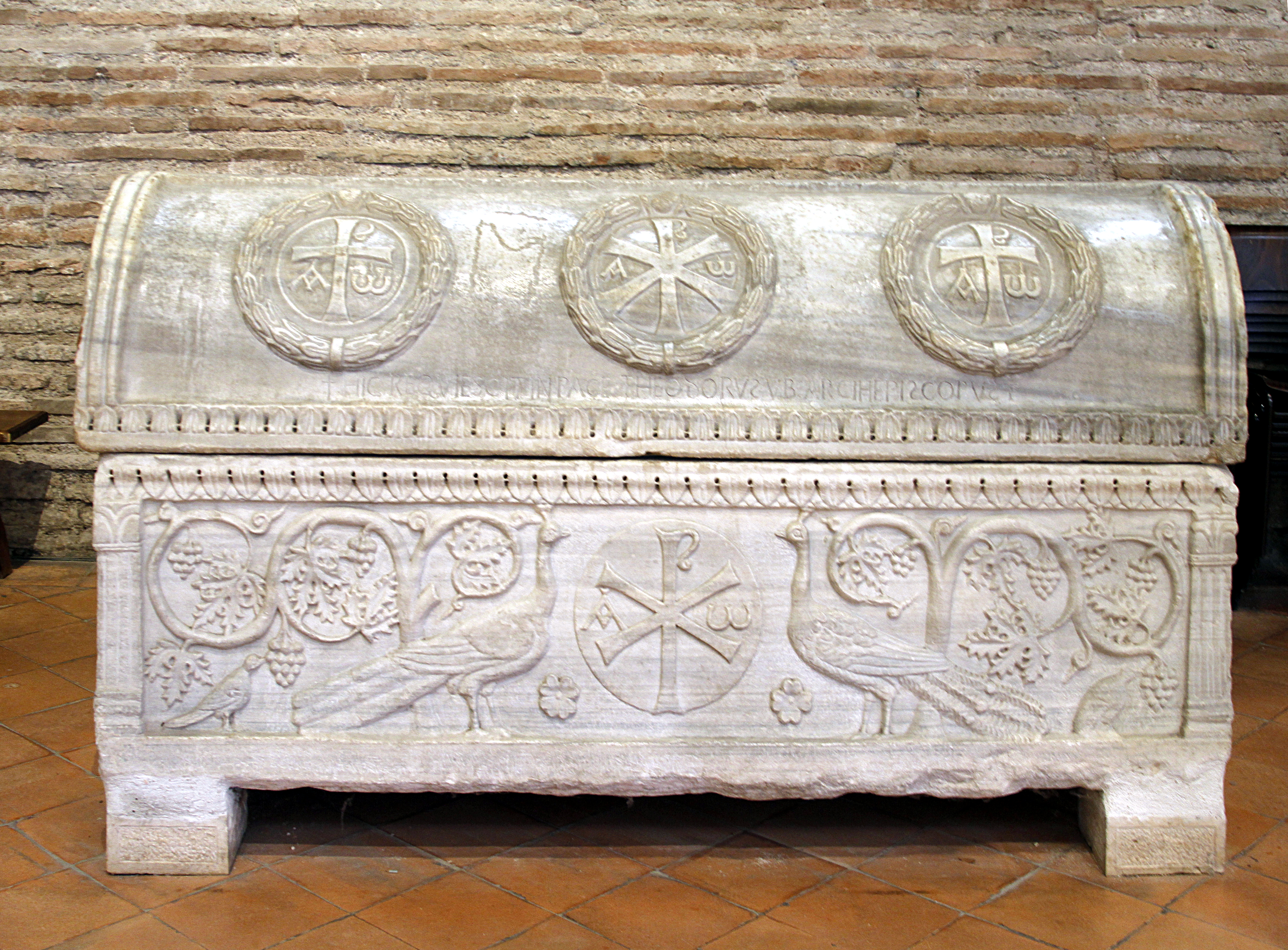
- Theodorus' sarcophagus in the Basilica of Sant'Apollinare in Classe, Ravenna (Note: The Latin epigraph on the sarcophagus' lid reads: "†HIC REQUIESCIT IN PACE THEOδORVƧ V.B. ARCIHEPIƧCOPUƧ†", roughly translatable as "Here rests in peace the archbishop Theodorus".)
- Church: Catholic Church
- Diocese: Archdiocese of Ravenna
- In office: September 677 – 18 January 691
- Predecessor: Reparatus
- Successor: Damianus

Theodorus was the archbishop of Ravenna from 677 to 691.

== Life ==
Consecrated in Ravenna by his suffragans, under his tenure the church of Ravenna reconciled with the Roman papacy, thus ending a period of acrimony during which the Byzantine emperor Constans II, who was a monothelite, directly opposed the Pope by proclaiming the autocephaly of the church of Ravenna in 666.
In fact, in 680 Theodorus adhered to the Sixth Ecumenical Council which condemned monothelitism in favour of the Chalcedonian orthodoxy, thus resubmitting his church to Pope Agatho, and in 682 he formally renounced to the typus of autocephaly, following the resumption of friendly relations between Constans II's successor Constantine IV and the new Pope Leo II.
Writing for the Catholic Encyclopedia, church historian Umberto Benigni claimed that he "was hated by his clergy for having suppressed many abuses among them".

According to the 9th-century historian Andreas Agnellus, during Theodorus' tenure his namesake Theodorus, exarch of Ravenna, ordered a chapel dedicated to Saint Theodore the Deacon, but of which there is no trace today.

== Burial ==
Theodorus' stone sarcophagus is located in the Basilica of Sant'Apollinare in Classe, along with others belonging to some of his distant successors such as Gratiosus (died circa 789). All these sarcophagi were sculpted imitating higher-quality models from previous centuries.

== See also ==
- Byzantine Papacy
- Exarchate of Ravenna

== Notes ==
Catholic Church titles
Preceded by Reparatus	Archbishop of Ravenna; 677-691	Succeeded by Damianus
