= Ursus of Ravenna =

Bishop of Ravenna

Saint Ursus of Ravenna
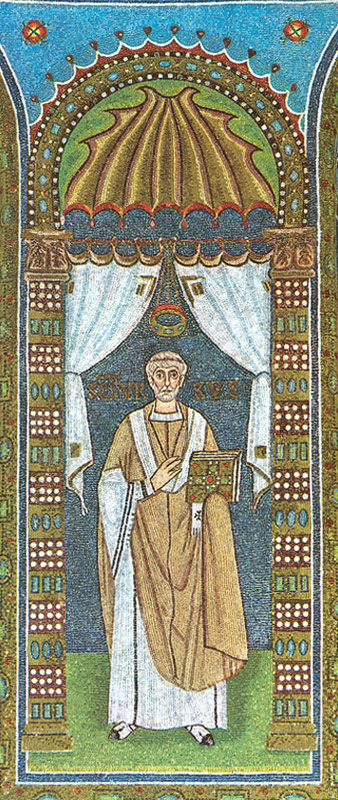
- Mosaic icon of St. Ursus in the Basilica of Sant'Apollinare in Classe, Ravenna

Bishop of Ravenna
- Born: Sicily
- Died: 13 April 396; Ravenna
- Venerated in: Eastern Orthodox Church; Roman Catholic Church
- Canonized: Pre-congregation
- Feast: 13 April
- Patronage: Against faintness and kidney disease

Ursus (Italian: Orso, died 13 April 396) was bishop of Ravenna during the late 4th century who is venerated as a saint in the Eastern Orthodox Church and Roman Catholic church, with his feast day being commemorated on 13 April.

== Biography ==
Ursus was born into a noble pagan family in Sicily but fled to Ravenna due to his family's anger with his conversion to Christianity. He was elected bishop following the death of Liberius III and held the position for 26 years. He is best known as the founder of the Ravenna Cathedral, which was named Basilica Ursiana in his honor. Ursus's cathedral was demolished and rebuilt in the 18th century. According to Andreas Agnellus, he died on 13 April on Easter Sunday, and he was buried at the Basilica Ursiana.

The dates of Ursus's tenure as bishop are a subject of some dispute. While some historians place it at 370–396, with the foundation of the Basilica Ursiana in 385, others place it at c. 405–431 to account for claims that he was directly succeeded by Peter Chrysologus.

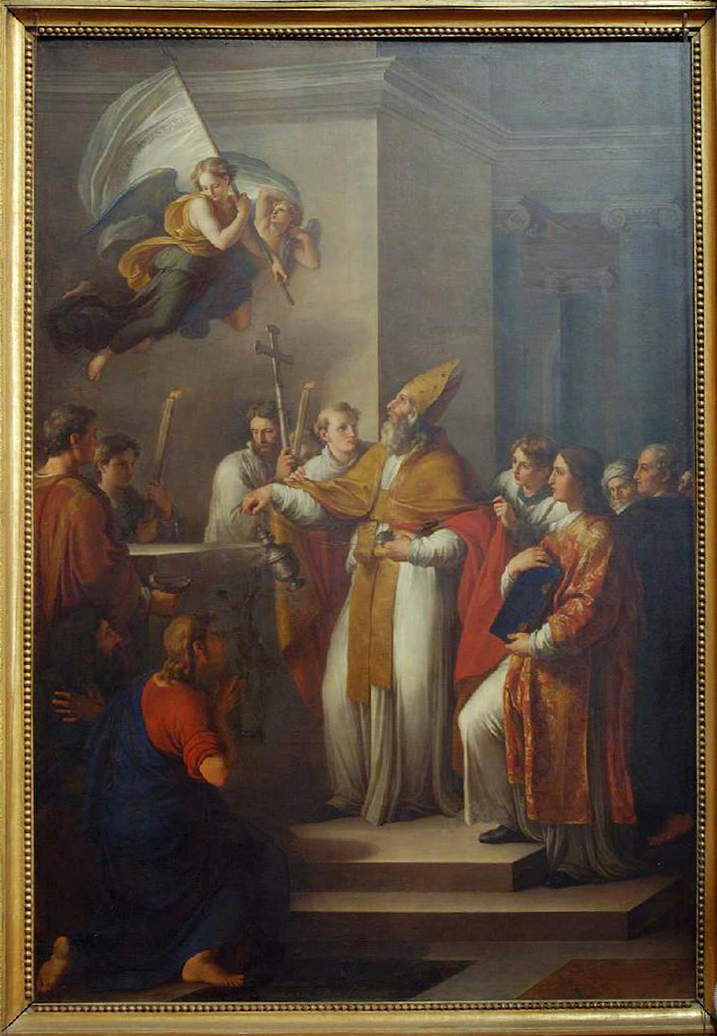
Saint Ursus Consecrates the Cathedral of Ravenna by Vincenzo Camuccini
