= Grazioso =

Grazioso may refer to:

== People ==
=== Given name ===
- Grazioso, Italian form of the Latin given name Gratiosus
- Gratiosus (bishop of Novara) (died 750)
- Gratiosus I (bishop of Sutri) (fl. 680)
- Gratiosus II (bishop of Sutri) (fl. 743)
- Gratiosus (archbishop of Ravenna) (r. 786–789)
- Grazioso Benincasa (born 1400), Italian cartographer
- Grazioso da Padova (fl. 1391–1407), Italian composer
- Grazioso Percacino (fl. 1553–1611), Italian printer
- Gratiosus of Rome (8th century), Byzantine duke
- Grazioso Rusca (1757–1829), Swiss sculptor
- Grazioso Spazzi (1816–1892), Italian sculptor

=== Surname ===
- David Grazioso (1921–2003), Italian painter

== Music ==
- Grazioso, meaning 'graceful', see glossary of music terminology#G
- Grazioso (ballet), ballet by Peter Martins to music by Mikhail Glinka

== See also ==
- Gratiosus (disambiguation)
