= Gratiosus =

Gratiosus may refer to:

== People ==
- Gratiosus, member of the Gregorian mission and fourth abbot of St Augustine's, Canterbury (626–638)
- Gratiosus I (bishop of Sutri) (fl. 680)
- Gratiosus II (bishop of Sutri) (fl. 743)
- Gratiosus (bishop of Novara) (died 750)
- Gratiosus of Rome (8th century), Byzantine duke
- Gratiosus (archbishop of Ravenna) (r. 786–789)
- Gratiosus de Padua (fl. 1391–1407), Italian composer

== Science ==
- gratiosus, common specific name, meaning gracile

== See also ==
- Grazioso (disambiguation)
