= Bishop of Ravenna =

Catholic bishopric in Italy

This page is a list of Catholic bishops and archbishops of Ravenna and, from 1947 of the Archdiocese of Ravenna and Cervia, which in 1985 became styled the Archdiocese of Ravenna-Cervia. The earlier bishops were frequently tied to the Exarchate of Ravenna.

== Diocese of Ravenna (1st – 6th century) ==
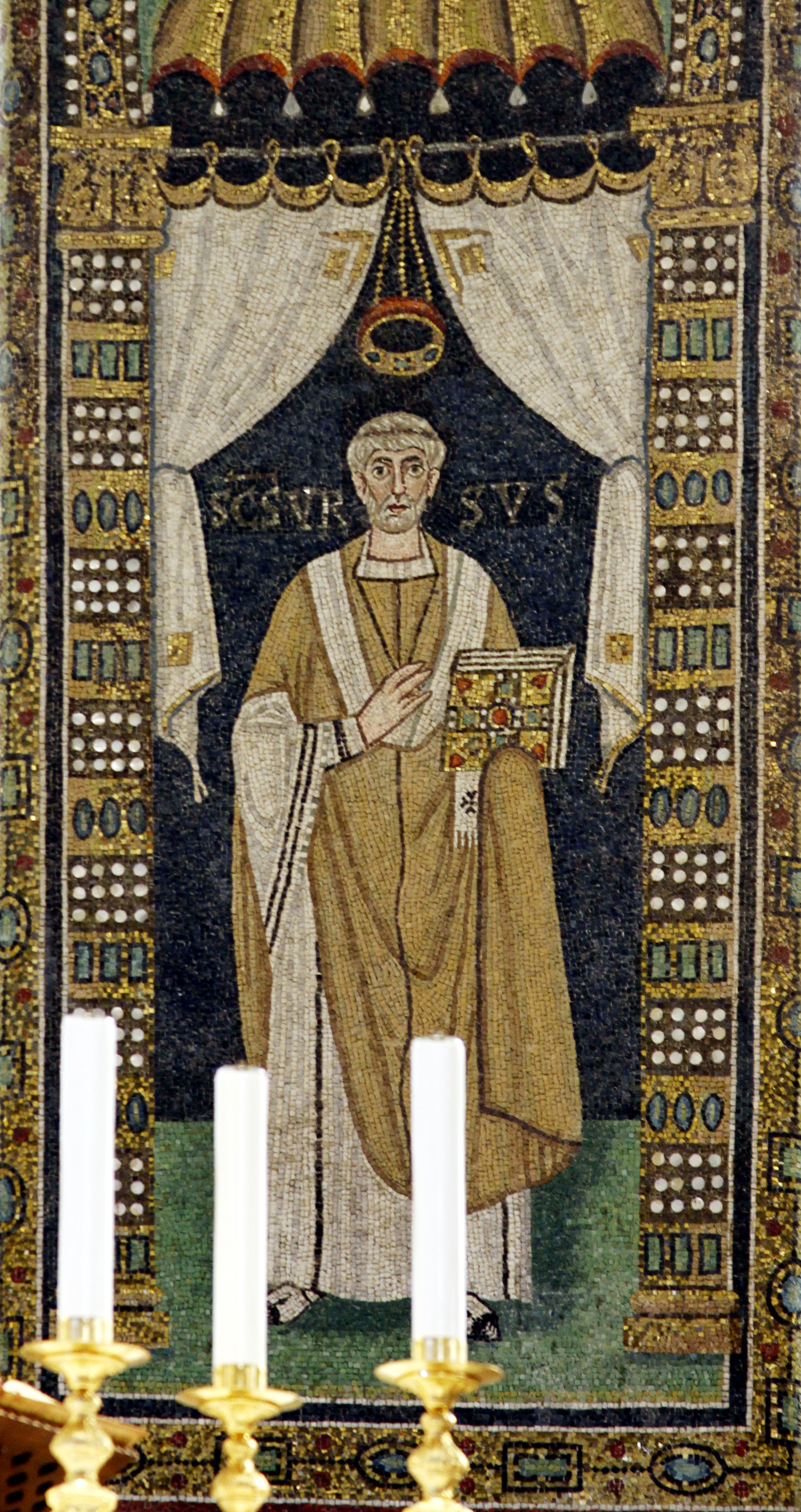
Mosaic of Saint Ursus (bishop 399–426) in the Basilica of Sant'Apollinare in Classe, Ravenna

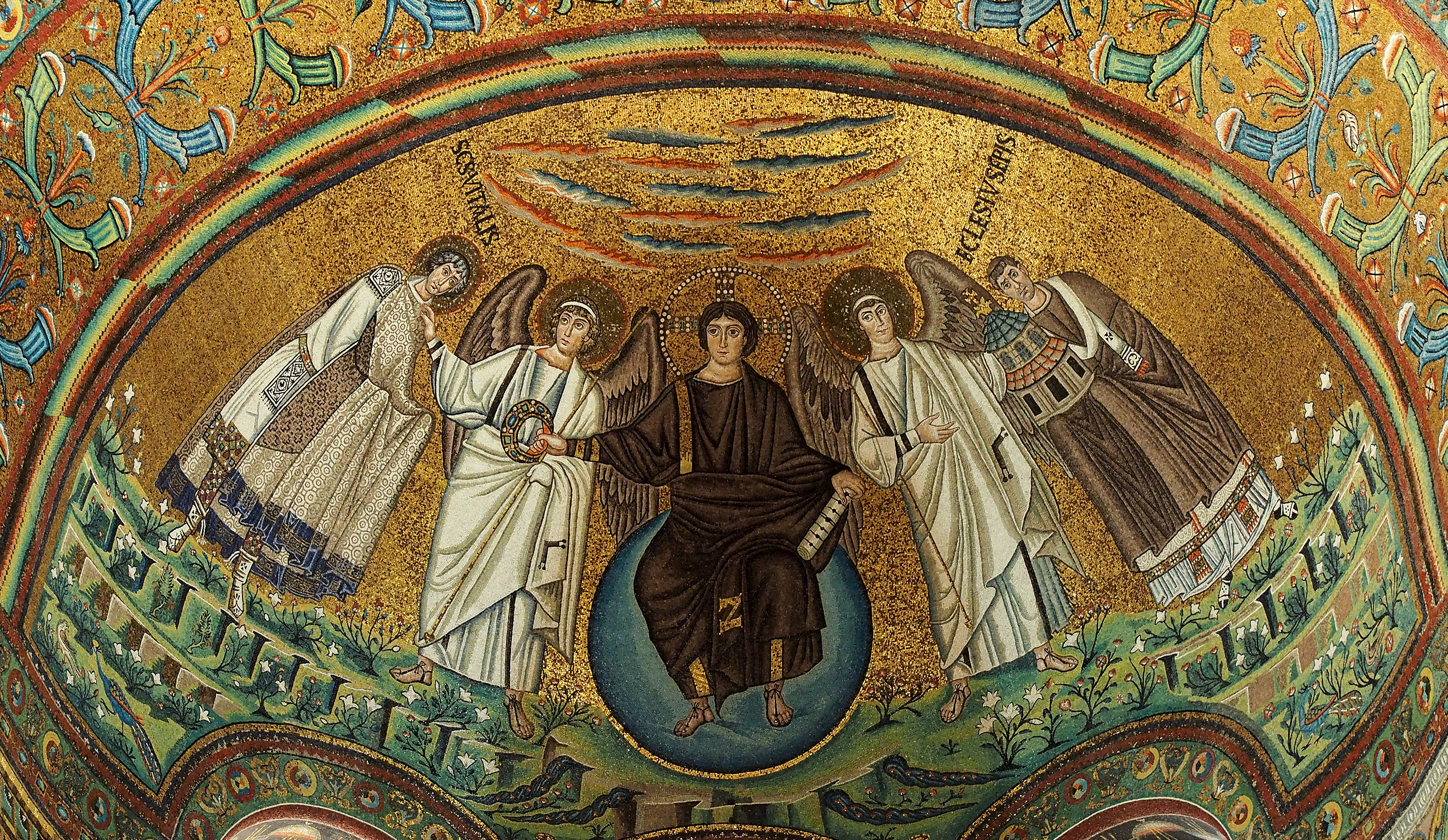
Apse mosaic, Basilica of San Vitale: At far right of image, Ecclesius is portrayed presenting Christ with a model of the church

- St. Apollinaris, traditionally 1st century and legendarily appointed to the episcopate by Peter the Apostle himself, but dates are uncertain; may instead belong to the 2nd century
- St. Adheritus, 2nd century
- St. Eleuchadius, died c. 112, but chronology uncertain
- St. Marcian, or Marcianus — died c. 127; feast day May 22
- St. Calocerus
- St. Proculus
- St. Probus I died 175
- St. Dathus
- St. Liberius I
- St. Agapitus
- St. Marcellinus,
- St. Severus (c. 308–c. 348)
- St. Liberius II
- St. Probus II
- Florentius
- Liberius III (c. 380–c. 399)
- St. Ursus (c. 399–c. 426), who built the Basilica Ursiana, the original Cathedral Basilica of the Resurrection of Our Lord (the Anastasis in the Byzantine period)
- John Angeloptes, "the Angel-seer" c. 430–433. Revered as a saint, feast day 27 November. In his Liber pontificalis ecclesiae Ravennatis (LPR; 'Book of Pontiffs of the Church of Ravenna'), Andreas Agnellus (9th century), dates Angeloptes's episcopate to late in the 5th century, conflating details of his life with John II (477–494), whom he designates "John I". (Note: The chronology of Andreas Agnellus in LPR is confused: He lists only one bishop of Ravenna with the name John in the 5th century. He omits the years 430–433 as a separate period of office, conflating John Angeloptes (who is "John I") with John II. He mistakenly assigns events from Angeloptes's time, in the earlier part of the century, to the episcopate of John II (477–494) – or, as Agnellus designates him by this error – "John Angeloptes", thus "John I". This confusion is explained by the 19th century historian, Thomas Hodgkin: St. John II ruled the See from 477 to 494. Here at last we get two certain dates from the inscription on his tomb, and the recovery of this name and these dates enables us to correct an omission of Agnellus and to understand the cause of the wild errors which he has committed in his chronology. For it is now clear that in his life of John the Angel-seer he has run two bishops into one, and has calmly blended transactions reaching over a period of some sixty or seventy years, the death of Honorius, the invasion of Attila, the war between Odovacar and Theodoric, in his life of a bishop who according to his own account ruled his See for 16 years, 10 months, and 18 days. It was this John II who negotiated the peace, the short-lived peace between Odovacar and Theodoric which terminated the long siege of Ravenna (493). — Hodgkin (1892). Italy and Her Invaders. p. 911)
- St. Peter Chrysologus (433– c. 449)
- Neon, c. 449 – c. 452 (c. 450 – c. 473 according to Agnellus)
- Exuperantius c. 452 – c. 477 (c. 473 – c. 477 according to Agnellus)
- John II (erroneously ordered as "John I", "the angel-seer" by Agnellus; 477–494)
- Peter II (494–519)
- Aurelian (519–521)
- Ecclesius, or Ecclesio Celio di Ravenna (522–532) — started construction of the city's Basilica of San Vitale and is represented there in the apse mosaic
- St. Ursicinus (533–536) — ordered the construction of the Basilica of Sant'Apollinare in Classe
- Victor (538–545) — features on monograms on the capitals in the Basilica of San Vitale

== Archdiocese of Ravenna (6th century – 1947) ==
=== 6th century ===
- Maximianus of Ravenna (546–556 or 557) — Ravenna's 28th bishop (or 27th, according to the LPR), he was its first archbishop. The Throne of Maximian, a Justinian Byzantine-style cathedra, was made for him.
- Agnellus (556–569)
- Peter III the Elder, Petrus Senior or Pietro III (569–578)
- John III the Roman, or Giovanni III (578–595) (Note: Listepd as the second John in LPR)
- Mariniano (595–606)

=== 7th century ===
- John IV (607–625) (Note: Listed as the third John in LPR, owing to Andreas Agnellus's conflating John I and John II, both, as John the Angel-seer)
- John V (625– c. 631) (Note: Listed as the fourth John in LPR)
- Bonus (c. 631 – c. 644)
- Maurus (archbishop of Ravenna) (c. 644– c. 671)
- Reparatus (c. 671 – c. 677)
- Theodorus (c. 677 – c. 691)
- Damian (c. 692 – c. 709)

=== 8th century ===
- St. Felix of Ravenna (c. 709–c. 725)
- John VI or Giovanni VI (c. 726 – c. 744) (Note: Listed as the fifth John in LPR)
- Sergius (c. 744 – c. 769)
- Leo I (c. 770 – c. 777)
- John VII or Giovanni VII (c. 777 – c. 784) (Note: Listed as the sixth John in LPR)
- Gratiosus (c. 785 – c. 789)
- Valerius (c. 789 – c. 810)

=== 9th century ===
- Martin (c. 810 – c. 818)
- Petronax (c. 818 – c. 837)
- George (c. 837 – c. 846)
- Deusdedit (c. 847 – c. 850)
- John VIII or Giovanni VIII (c. 850–878), excommunicated 861 by Pope Nicholas I, later reconciled
- Romano di Calcinaria (Romanus) (878–888)
- Deusdedit (889–898)

=== 10th century ===
- John IX (898–904)
- John of Tossignano (Giovanni da Tossignano; 905–914), later Pope John X
- Constantine (914–926)
- Peter IV (927–971)
- Onestus (971–983)
- Giovanni Vincenzo, Giovanni da Besate, or John X (983–998)
- Gerbert of Aurillac (998–999), later Pope Sylvester II

=== 11th century ===
- Leo II (999–1001)
- Frederick (1002–1004)
- Ethelbert (1004–1014)
- Arnold of Saxony (1014–1019)
- Heribert (1019–1027)
- Gebeardo Tedesco, Gebeardo da Eichstätt (1027–1044) formerly the canon of the cathedral of Eichstätt in his homeland, Bavaria
- Witgero (1044–1046)
- Hunfredus (1046–1051)
- John Henry (1051–1072)
- Guiberto di Ravenna (1072–1100), later the Antipope Clement III

=== 12th century ===
- Ottone Boccatortia (1100–1110)
- Geremia (1110–1117)
- Filippo (1118)
- Gualtiero (1119–1144)
- Mose da Vercelli (1144–1154)
- Anselm of Havelberg (1155–1158)
- Guido di Biandrate (1159–1169)
- Gerard (1169–1190)
- Guglielmo di Cabriano (William of Cabriano; 1190–1201), jurist and author of

=== 13th century ===
- Alberto Oselletti (1201–1207)
- Egidio de Garzoni (1207–1208)
- Ubaldo (1208–1216)
- Piccinino (1216)
- Simeone (1217–1228)
- Teoderico (1228–1249)
- Filippo da Pistoia (1251–1270)
- Sede vacante ('vacant see') 1270–1274
- Bonifacio Fieschi di Lavagna (1274–1294)
- Obizzo Sanvitale (1295–1303)

=== 14th century ===
- St. Rinaldo da Concorezzo (1303–1321)
- Rinaldo da Polenta (1321–1322)
- Aimerico di Chastellux (1322–1332)
- Guido de Roberti (1332–1333)
- Francesco Michiel (1333–1342)
- Nicola Canal (1342–1347)
- Fortanerius Vassalli (1347–1351)
- Petrocino Casalesco (1362–1369)
- Pietro Pileo di Prata (1370–1387)
- Cosimo de' Migliorati (1387–1400), later Pope Innocent VII

=== 15th century ===
- Giovanni Nicolai de' Migliorati (1400–1405)
- Tommaso Perendoli (1411–1445)
- Bartolomeo Roverella (1445–1475)
- Filiasio Roverella (1475–1516)

=== 16th century ===
- Niccolò Fieschi (1516–1517)
- Urbano Fieschi (1517–1521)
- Pietro de Accolti de Aretio – appointed 25 June 1524, resigned December 1524
- Benedetto de Accolti the Younger – appointed 17 August 1524, died in office 21 September 1549
- Ranuccio Farnese (11 October 1549 – 28 April 1564)
- Giulio della Rovere – appointed 1566, died in office 3 September 1578
- Cristoforo Boncampagni (1578–1603)

=== 17th century ===
- Pietro Aldobrandini – appointed 1604, died in office 10 February 1621
- Luigi Capponi – appointed 3 March 1621, resigned 18 September 1645
- Luca Torreggiani – r. 1645–1669
- Paluzzo Paluzzi Altieri degli Albertoni – appointed 19 May 1670, resigned 19 February 1674
- Fabio Guinigi (1674–1691)
- Raimondo Ferretti (1692–1719)

=== 18th century ===
- Girolamo Crispi (1720–1727)
- Maffeo Nicola Farsetti (1727–1741)
- Sede vacante ('vacant see') 1741–1745
- Ferdinando Romualdo Guiccioli (1745–1763)
- Nicola Oddi (1764–1767)
- Antonio Cantoni (1767–1781)
- Sede vacante 1781–1785
- Antonio Codronchi (1785–1826)

=== 19th century ===
- Clarissimo Falconieri Mellini – appointed 3 July 1826, died in office 2 April 1859
- Enrico Orfei – appointed 23 March 1860, died in office 22 December 1870
- Vincenzo Moretti – appointed 27 October 1871, resigned 22 September 1879
- Giacomo Cattani – appointed 22 September 1879, died in office 14 February 1887
- Sebastiano Galeati – appointed 23 May 1887, died in office 25 January 1901

=== 20th century ===
- Agostino Gaetano Riboldi – appointed 15 April 1901, died in office 25 April 1902
- St. Guido Maria Conforti – appointed 9 June 1902, resigned 12 October 1904. Conforti was canonised in 2011
- Pasquale Morganti – appointed 14 November 1904, died in office 18 December 1921
- Antonio Lega – succeeded 18 December 1921, died in office 16 November 1946

== Archdiocese of Ravenna and Cervia (1947–1986) ==
- Giacomo Lercaro – in office from 31 January 1947 to 19 April 1952, when appointed Archbishop of Bologna
- Egidio Negrin – in office from May 1952 until appointed Archbishop (Personal Title) of Treviso in April 1956
- Salvatore Baldassarri – appointed 3 May 1956, resigned November 1975

== Archdiocese of Ravenna-Cervia (1986–present) ==
- Ersilio Tonini – appointed November 1975, retired October 1990 (see diocese's name change in 1986; became Cardinal after retirement)
- Luigi Amaducci – appointed October 1990, retired March 2000
- Giuseppe Verucchi – appointed March 2000, retired November 2012
- Lorenzo Ghizzoni - appointed November 2012

== See also ==
- Timeline of Ravenna
- Corpus Inscriptionum Latinarum – Collection of ancient Latin inscriptions, which includes the inscription on John II's (477–494) tomb (CIL 11, 304) – and that of the other episcopal tombs of this era

== Sources ==
- Angold, Michael (2019). "A Papal Version of the Fourth Crusade: The Mosaics of San Giovanni Evangelista at Ravenna". Speculum. 94 (4 (OCTOBER)): 1006–1032.
- Agnellus of Ravenna (2004). The Book of Pontiffs of the Church of Ravenna. Medieval Texts in Translation. Translated by Deliyannis, Deborah Mauskopf. Introduction and notes by Deborah Mauskopf Deliyannis. Catholic University of America Press. doi:10.2307/j.ctt284wdr. ISBN 978-0-8132-1358-3. JSTOR j.ctt284wdr.
- Holweck, Frederick George (1969). A biographical dictionary of the saints, with a general introduction on hagiology. Detroit: Gale Research Co.
- Martindale, John R.; Jones, A. H. M.; Morris, John (1992), The Prosopography of the Later Roman Empire, vol. III: AD 527–641, Cambridge University Press, ISBN 0-521-20160-8, [Part A of volume III: Abandanes – ‘Lyad ibn Ghanm].
