= Agnellus (bishop of Ravenna) =

Agnellus (487 – 1 August 570) was a bishop of Ravenna in the Praetorian prefecture of Italy from 557 to his death. The main source about him is by Liber Pontificalis Ecclesiae Ravennatis by Andreas Agnellus.

== Biography ==
Agnellus was probably born in 487, based on the estimation of his age at the time of death. He was apparently born to a prominent family of Italian nobles, as he is recorded inheriting great wealth. He married and had a daughter. The death of his wife motivated him to become a priest. He was consecrated a deacon by Ecclesius of Ravenna (term 521–532).

Agnellus became Bishop of Ravenna in 557. He held the title until his death on 1 August, 570. His term lasted 13 years. He was reportedly 83 years old at the time of death. A granddaughter of his was named as the heir to his estate.

== Sources ==
- Martindale, John R., ed. (1992). The Prosopography of the Later Roman Empire: Volume III, AD 527–641. Cambridge: Cambridge University Press. ISBN 0-521-20160-8.
