= Giuseppe Verucchi =

Italian Roman Catholic prelate (1937–2025)

His Excellency Giuseppe Verucchi
- Archbishop Emeritus of Ravenna-Cervia
- Archdiocese: Ravenna-Cervia
- Appointed: 9 March 2000
- Term ended: 17 November 2012
- Predecessor: Luigi Amaducci
- Successor: Lorenzo Ghizzoni

Orders
- Ordination: 29 June 1961
- Consecration: 13 May 2000 by Benito Cocchi

Personal details
- Born: 22 November 1937 Pavullo nel Frignano, Italy
- Died: 12 February 2025 (aged 87) Modena, Italy
- Motto: Ut unum sint
- Coat of arms

Styles of Giuseppe Verucchi
- Reference style: His Excellency; The Most Reverend
- Spoken style: Your Excellency
- Religious style: Bishop

Giuseppe Verucchi (22 November 1937 – 12 February 2025) was an Italian Roman Catholic prelate. He was archbishop of Ravenna-Cervia from 2000 to 2012. Verucchi died in Modena on 12 February 2025, at the age of 87.

Catholic Church titles
Preceded by Luigi Amaducci	Archbishop of Ravena-Cervia; 2000–2012	Succeeded by Lorenzo Ghizzoni
