= Mutien-Marie Wiaux =

Belgian Christian brother, educator and saint

Saint Mutien-Marie Wiaux FSC
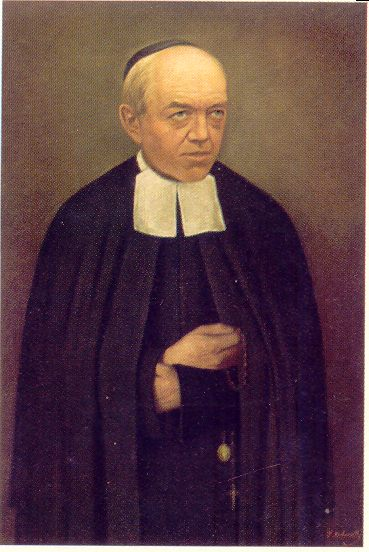
- Born: Louis-Joseph Wiaux; 20 March 1841; Mellet, Hainaut, Belgium
- Died: 30 January 1917 (aged 75); Malonne, Namur, Belgium
- Venerated in: Roman Catholic Church (Brothers of the Christian Schools)
- Beatified: 30 October 1977, Vatican City, by Pope Paul VI
- Canonized: 10 December 1989, Vatican City, by Pope John Paul II
- Major shrine: Shrine of Brother Mutien-Marie; Fond de Malonne 117; Malonne, Namur, Belgium
- Feast: 30 January

Mutien-Marie Wiaux (also known as Mutien-Marie of Malonne; 20 March 1841 – 30 January 1917) was a Belgian member of the Brothers of Christian Schools, who spent his life as a teacher and is honored as a saint by the Catholic Church.

== Life ==
=== Early life ===
He was born Louis-Joseph Wiaux in the small village of Mellet, now part of the town of Les Bons Villers, in French-speaking Belgium, to a devoutly Catholic family. The third of six children, his father was a blacksmith, while his mother ran a café out of their house. After the joviality of evening, where customers would enjoy the beer and card games, the family would end their day by praying the rosary together.

Wiaux was a gentle, obedient boy who was marked by his piety, leading his classmates to pray at their local church at the end of the school day. After he finished elementary school, he worked as an apprentice in his father's shop, where he found that he was both physically and temperamentally unfit for this career. The call to join a religious order, meanwhile, had begun to take root in his heart, and he considered following his brother into the Society of Jesus.

=== Christian Brother ===
The pastor of the town, the Abbé Sallié, however, spoke to the boy about the Brothers of the Christian Schools (commonly called the Christian Brothers), who were about to open a school in the nearby town of Gosselies. He went to meet them and was convinced that it was the way of life he wanted. He traveled to the city of Namur, where he entered the Brothers' novitiate on 7 April 1856, and received the habit that following July. At that time he was also given the religious name of Mutien-Marie ("Mutien" after the ancient Roman martyr Mucian).

Mutien gained the reputation of strictly living according to the Rule of the Institute. Nonetheless, his fellow novices enjoyed his company due to his reliable sense of humor.

On 8 September 1857 Mutien left the novitiate to teach at an elementary school the Brothers ran in Chimay, followed the next year by an assignment at another of the Brother's elementary schools, the Institut Saint-Georges in Brussels. In 1859 he was assigned to teach at the Institut Saint-Berthuin, a boarding school in the village of Mallone (now part of the city of Namur). He taught there for the next 58 years, until his death.

At first, combining teaching with the spiritual life was difficult for Mutien, and his students were known as disruptive and out of control. His performance as a teacher was judged to be so poor that his superiors considered expelling him from their Order, a teaching one, for the good name of the school. But in time, with the help of the Brother who headed the Fine Arts Department, Mutien grew into an effective teacher and Prefect of discipline, known for his patience and piety. He taught music and art, a saint of sensibility not intellect. He was known within the community for being available to help with any need which arose, whether it was comforting a homesick student or going to the train station to meet a traveler unfamiliar with the city. Mutien also taught catechism to the children of the town at the local parish church. He was known to spend whatever time he could in prayer before the tabernacle or at the grotto of Our Lady on the school grounds.

=== Death ===
Mutien-Marie enjoyed good health throughout his life, until November 1916 when he became noticeably ill and was sent to the house infirmary. He struggled to continue sharing the community's prayer routine. On the following 26 January, despite his weakness and the bitter cold, he was found praying at the communion rail before the Brothers' first prayer service of the day. He was clearly failing and the Brother Superior suggested that he return to the infirmary. He never left it again, dying on 30 January 1917. He was buried two days later in the Brothers' plot in the town cemetery of Malonne.

Mutien's fame began to spread after his death and miracles began to be attributed to his intercession.

== Veneration ==
This reputation of sanctity lead to a large number of pilgrims to Mutien's grave. It reached such a degree that the decision was made to make his remains more accessible to the veneration of the public. With the opening of a process of canonization by the local diocese, his remains were moved on 11 May 1926 to a new tomb next to the parish church, right on the main street of the town.

Mutien-Marie was beatified on 30 October 1977 by Pope Paul VI. Subsequent to this, a shrine was built in his honor in 1980, and his remains were moved again, to a white marble tomb within the shrine. He was canonized on 10 December 1989 by Pope John Paul II.

Saint Mutien-Marie's feast day is celebrated among the Brothers on 30 January.
