= Luigi Amaducci =

- Archbishop of Ravenna-Cervia
- Church: Catholic Church
- Archdiocese: Archdiocese of Ravenna-Cervia
- In office: 27 October 1990 – 9 March 2000
- Predecessor: Ersilio Tonini
- Successor: Giuseppe Verucchi
- Previous posts: Bishop of Cesena-Sarsina (1986-1990); Bishop of Cesena & Sarsina(1977-1986)

Orders
- Ordination: 5 April 1947 by Luigi Traglia
- Consecration: 18 June 1977 by Giovanni Proni

Personal details
- Born: 4 March 1924 San Pancrazio (southeast of Russi), Province of Ravenna, Kingdom of Italy
- Died: 3 May 2010 (aged 86) Cesena, Emilia-Romagna, Italy

Styles of Luigi Amaducci
- Reference style: The Most Reverend
- Spoken style: Your Excellency
- Religious style: monsignor

Luigi Amaducci (4 March 1924 – 3 May 2010) was the Catholic archbishop of the Archsdiocese of Ravenna-Cervia, Italy.

== Episcopacy ==
Luigi Amaducci was ordained to the priesthood on 5 April 1947. Amaducci was named bishop of what is now the Roman Catholic Diocese of Cesena-Sarsina on 28 May 1977 and was consecrated on 18 June 1977. On 27 October 1990 Amaducci was appointed archbishop of the Diocese of Ravenna-Cervia prior to retiring on 9 March 2000.
