= Cervia Cathedral =

Roman Catholic Cathedral in Cervia, Italy

Coordinates: 44.2609°N 12.3492°E

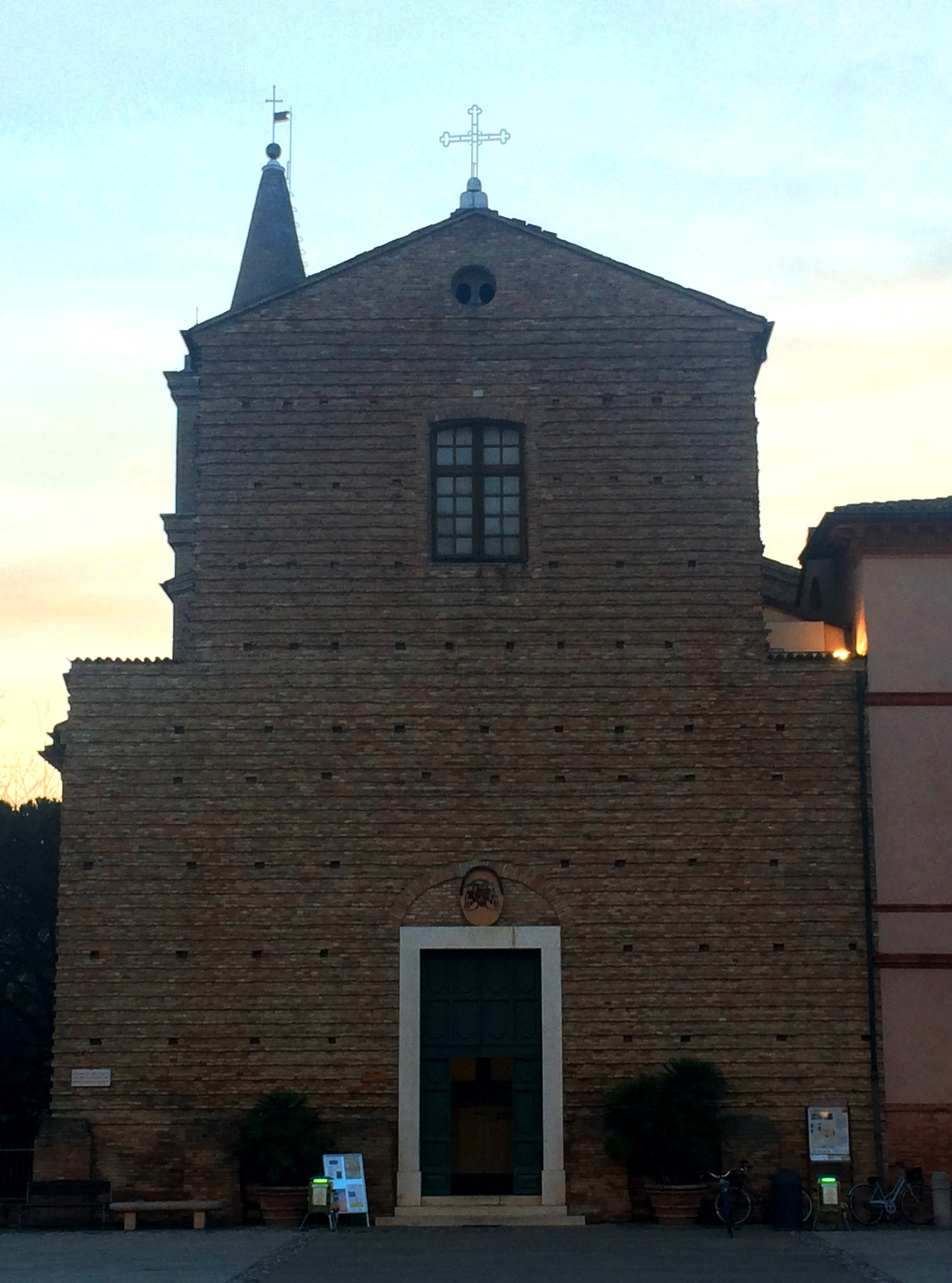
West front of the cathedral, to which the intended marble veneer was never added

Cervia Cathedral (Italian: Duomo di Cervia; Cattedrale di Santa Maria Assunta) is a Roman Catholic cathedral in the town of Cervia, in the province of Ravenna, region of Emilia-Romagna, Italy.

It is the former episcopal seat of the Diocese of Cervia and since 1986 has been a co-cathedral of the Archdiocese of Ravenna-Cervia.

== History ==
The bishop Francesco Riccamonti began construction in 1699 of the Baroque structure, which in 1702 was consecrated and dedicated to the Assumption of the Virgin Mary (Santa Maria Assunta). The façade remains incomplete without its marble sheathing. The architect was Francesco Fontana, son of the famed Roman architect Carlo Fontana.

The church is adjacent to the Bishop's palace (1702) and in 1750 was connected to the bell-tower. The layout is that of a Latin cross with six chapels. Among the altarpieces is a Madonna and Child, described as the Madonna della Neve, attributed to Barbara Longhi, a work originally from the former chiesa della Madonna della Neve, of Cervia Vecchia. There is also a St Joseph and Child Jesus by a follower of Guercino. The main altar in polychrome marble is derived from the deconsecrated church of San Domenico in Forlì, has an altarpiece depicting the Madonna of the Assumption between Saints Nicola and Bartholomew, by Giovanni Barbiani.

== See also ==
- Catholic Church in Italy
