= Ravenna papyri =

The Ravenna papyri, sometimes Italian papyri, are the surviving Late Latin papyrus documents of the chancery of the Archdiocese of Ravenna. They are archival material, not literary texts, and mainly concern the administration of ecclesiastical land and the preservation of ecclesiastical privileges. Most of the material originated in the Ravennan chancery, but some was sent there from elsewhere in Italy, such as Rome or Syracuse.

Latin papyri from western Europe are rare, and early palaeographers were greatly interested in the Ravennan examples. They are an important source for legal procedure in Late Antiquity and in the Exarchate of Ravenna. They also illustrate the evolution of Late Latin and late Roman cursive.

The documents include wills, donations to churches and monasteries, heritable leases of church lands, and sales of church lands. Sixty or so texts come from between 445 and the mid-7th century, with the latest of this early group being variously dated to 642/3 or 665/6. A late group of texts from the 9th and 10th centuries also exists, but is substantially less well studied.

== Sources ==
- MacCoull, Leslie S. B. (1991). "Ravenna Papyri". In Kazhdan, Alexander P (ed.). The Oxford Dictionary of Byzantium. Oxford University Press. ISBN 9780195046526.
