= Santissimo Redentore a Valmelaina =

Santissimo Redentore a Val Melaina
- Church of the Most Holy Redeemer in Val Melaina
- Chiesa del Santissimo Redentore a Val Melaina
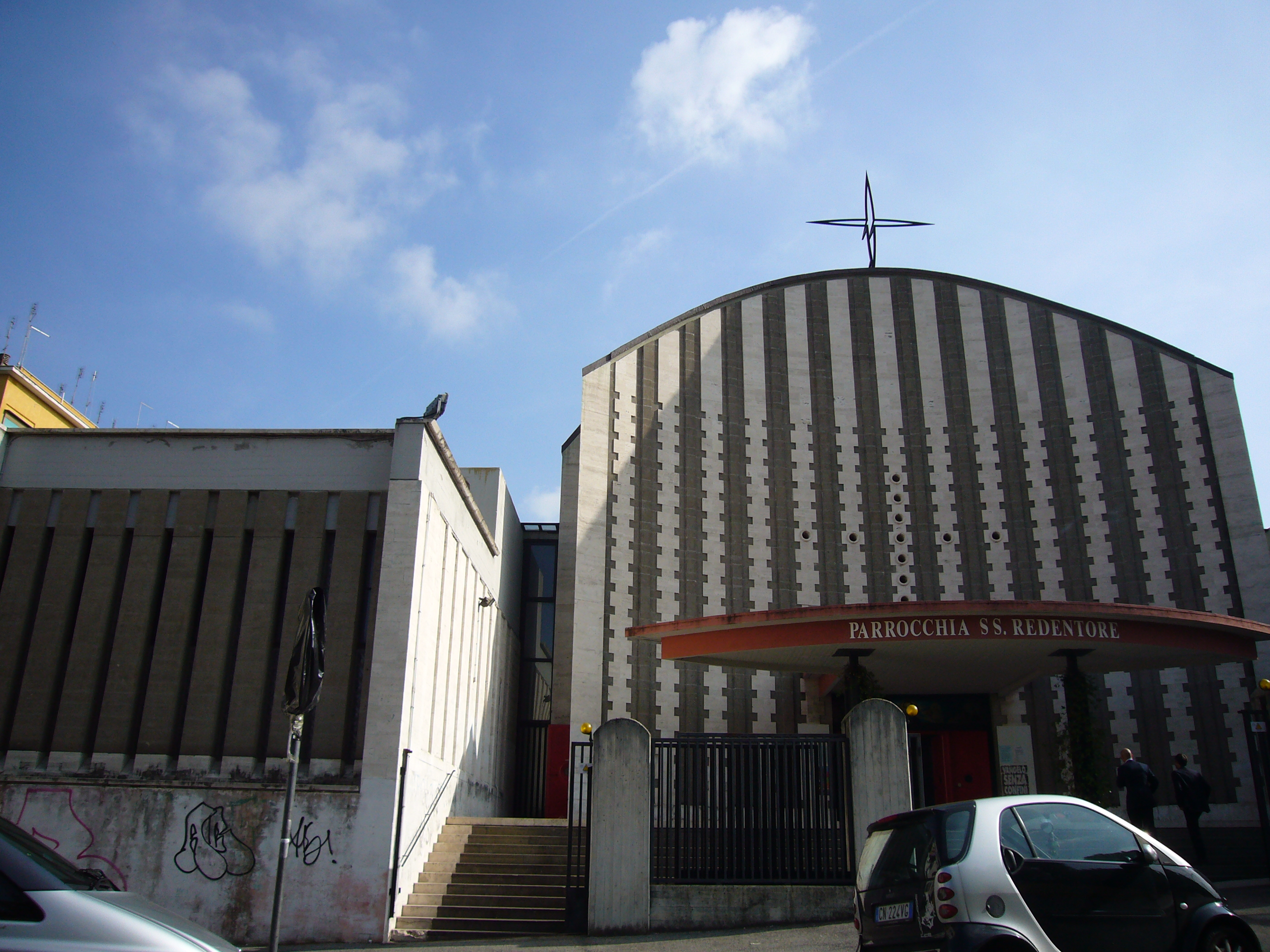
- Facade; it features alternating pillars of travertine and peperino
- Click on the map for a fullscreen view
- 41°56′53″N 12°31′42″E
- Location: Via Monte Ruggero 63, Monte Sacro, Rome
- Country: Italy
- Language: Italian
- Denomination: Catholic
- Tradition: Roman Rite
- Website: ssredentoreroma.it

History
- Status: titular church
- Dedication: Holy Redeemer
- Consecrated: 6 March 1977

Architecture
- Architect(s): Ennio Canino & Viviana Rizzi
- Architectural type: Modern
- Groundbreaking: 1975
- Completed: 1978

Administration
- Diocese: Rome

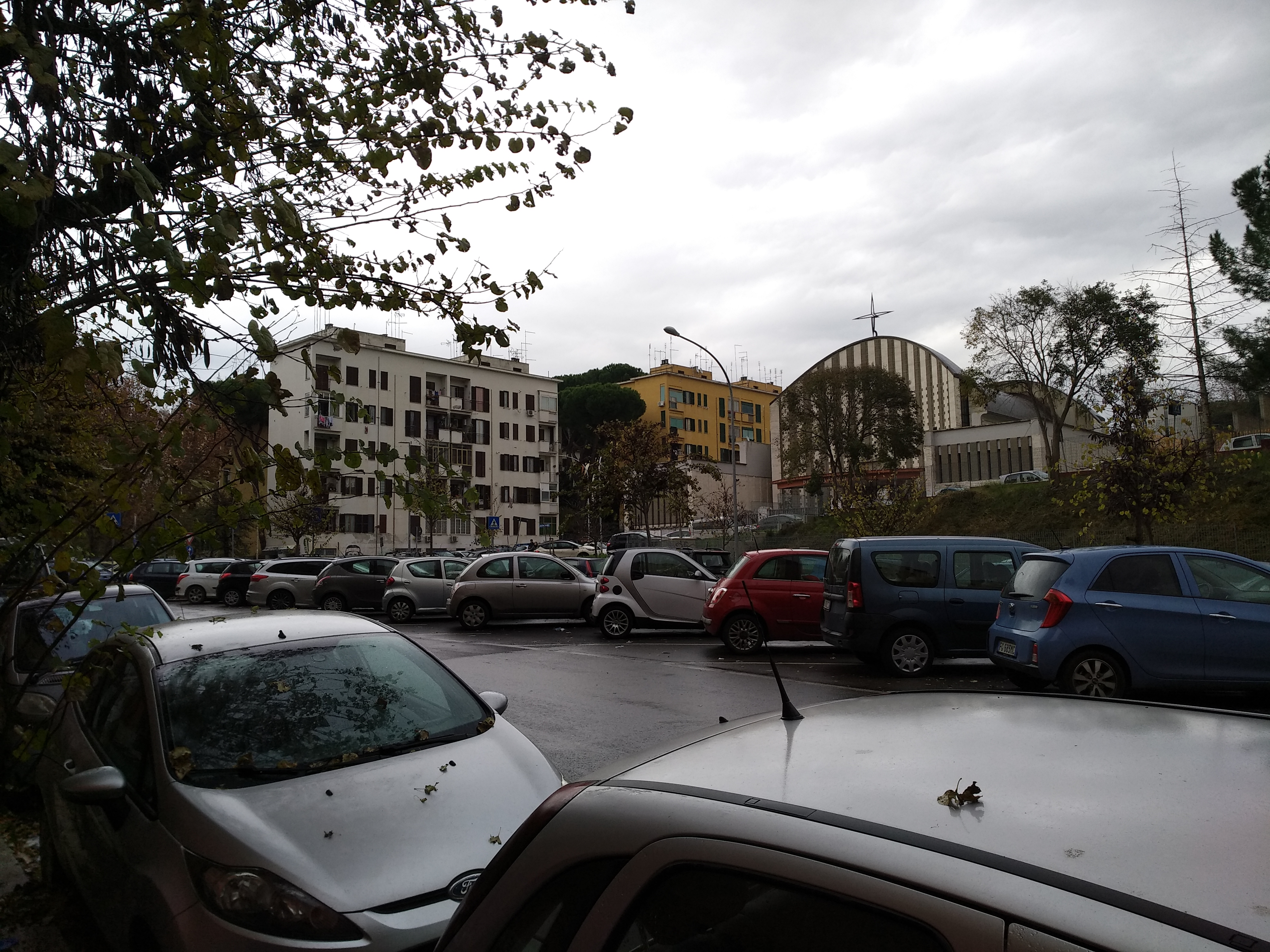
View of the church from nearby Via Scarpanto

Santissimo Redentore a Valmelaina is a 20th-century parochial church and titular church in northeastern Rome, dedicated to Jesus as the Most Holy Redeemer.

== History ==
The church was built in 1975–78.

On 26 November 1994, it was made a titular church to be held by a cardinal-priest.

Cardinal-protectors

- Ersilio Tonini (1994–2013)
- Ricardo Ezzati (2014–present)
