= Felix of Ravenna =

Felix (Felice) (died 724) was an archbishop of Ravenna of the eighth century, in office 709 to his death.

He was consecrated by Pope Constantine, but soon afterwards asserted his independence from Rome. When Ravenna was captured by the forces of Justinian II, Felix was taken to Constantinople, tried and blinded, and sent into exile. Justinian was deposed in 711, and Felix returned from Pontus to Ravenna.

He collected 176 sermons of his predecessor Peter Chrysologus.
