= Mucian =

Martyr of the early Christian Church

Saint Mucian (Mutien, Muziano, Mucianus) is a martyr of the early Christian Church. He was killed with a sword with two other men, named Mark and Paul, as well as a little boy whose name is unknown.

The Roman Martyrology states: "The holy martyrs Mark and Mucian who were slain with the sword for Christ's sake. When a little boy called upon them with a loud voice that they should not sacrifice to idols, he was ordered to be whipped, and as he then confessed Christ more loudly, he was slain, too, together with one Paul who was exhorting the martyrs."

His feast day is July 3. Mutien-Marie Wiaux (Mucian of Malonne) took his name from this martyr.
