= Eleuchadius =

Bishop of Ravenna and saint

Saint Eleuchadius

Bishop of Ravenna
- Born: Roman Greece
- Died: 112; Ravenna
- Venerated in: Roman Catholic Church; Eastern Orthodox Church
- Feast: 14 February

Eleuchadius (died 112) is a 2nd-century Christian saint venerated by the Roman Catholic and Eastern Orthodox Churches. He served as the third bishop of Ravenna from 100 to 112.

He was a Greek philosopher who was converted to Christianity by Apollinaris. He succeeded Adheritus as bishop of Ravenna in 100 and held the position for 12 years. He died in 112 and was buried outside the walls of Classe near Ravenna, but his remains were later relocated to the Basilica of San Michele Maggiore in Pavia.
