= Corebus =

Saint Corebus

Martyr
- Died: 138
- Venerated in: Roman Catholic Church
- Canonized: Pre-congregation
- Feast: 18 April

Corebus (c. 117–138) converted to Christianity by St. Eleutherius. Shortly afterwards he was made a prefect of Messina, Sicily. He suffered martyrdom at the hands of Emperor Hadrian in 138.
