= Serapion of Macedonia =

Saint Serapion

Martyr
- Died: 195
- Venerated in: Roman Catholic Church, Eastern Orthodox Church
- Canonized: Pre-congregation
- Feast: 13 July

Serapion was a martyr during the reign of Emperor Septimius Severus. An Oriental Martyr and celebrated among the Greeks, Serapion converted many pagans, and in the end was arrested and died at the stake. He is believed to have been put to death in Macedonia, in 195.
