= Faustus of Milan =

Saint Faustus of Milan

Martyr
- Died: 190; Milan, Italy
- Venerated in: Roman Catholic Church, Eastern Orthodox Church
- Canonized: Pre-congregation
- Feast: 7 August

Faustus of Milan was a soldier, who suffered martyrdom, at Milan, Italy, in 190.
