= Oliva of Brescia =

Christian martyr

Saint Oliva

Missionary and Martyr
- Died: 138
- Venerated in: Greek Orthodox Church Roman Catholic Church
- Canonized: Pre-congregation
- Major shrine: Saint Afra's Church, Brescia, Italy
- Feast: 5 March

Saint Oliva (or Olivia) (†138) was martyred under Hadrian; her relics are venerated at Saint Afra's Church, Brescia. Her feast day is 5 March.
