= Dathus =

Italian saint and bishop

Saint Dathus

Bishop of Ravenna
- Died: 190
- Venerated in: Roman Catholic Church, Eastern Orthodox Church
- Canonized: Pre-congregation
- Feast: 3 July
- Attributes: Dove

Dathus or Datus was Bishop of Ravenna during the late 2nd century. He was elected to succeed the previous bishop Probus I when miraculously, a dove appeared above his head.

According to Andreas Agnellus, his remains may have been kept in the Church of St. Probus in Classe, but this structure did not survive into Agnellus's day.
