= Romulus (martyr) =

Christian martyr (d. 117 AD)

Saint Romulus

Martyr
- Died: 117
- Venerated in: Roman Catholic Church
- Feast: 5 September

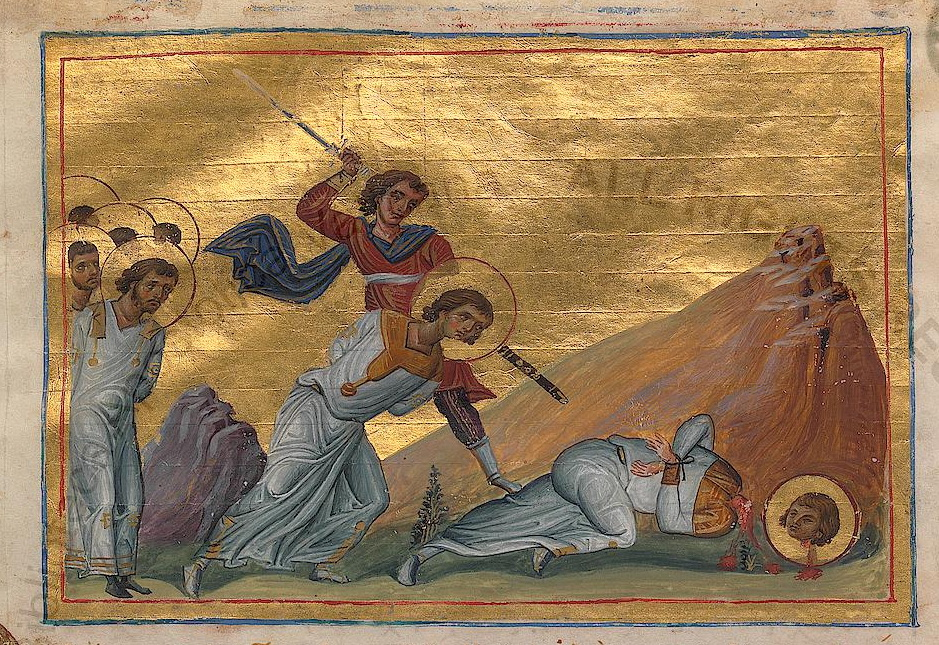
Martyrs Romilus and Eudoxius. Miniature from the Menologion of Basil II. 976-1025 (Vat. gr. 1613. P. 18)

Romulus (died 117 AD) was a 2nd-century Christian martyr. He was a member of the court of the Roman emperor Trajan and spoke out in defense of Christians who were being tortured and martyred. Trajan ordered that Romulus be arrested and tortured to death in the same manner as those in whose defense he had spoken. His feast day is 5 September.
