= Flavius Latinus of Brescia =

Saint Flavius Latinus

Martyr and Bishop of Brescia
- Died: 115
- Venerated in: Roman Catholic Church, Eastern Orthodox Church
- Feast: 24 March

Flavius Latinus (died 115) was a Christian martyr of the persecutions of Trajan.

He is said to be the third bishop of Brescia, successor to Saint Viator. This tradition is, however, questioned. Viator of Bergamo is a much later figure, and the reference to his earlier being a bishop of Brescia is doubted. The historical list of bishops of Brescia is not established so far back as the early persecutions in the 2nd century.

He was a Catholic and an Orthodox saint, feast day March 24.
