= Gratiosus (archbishop of Ravenna) =

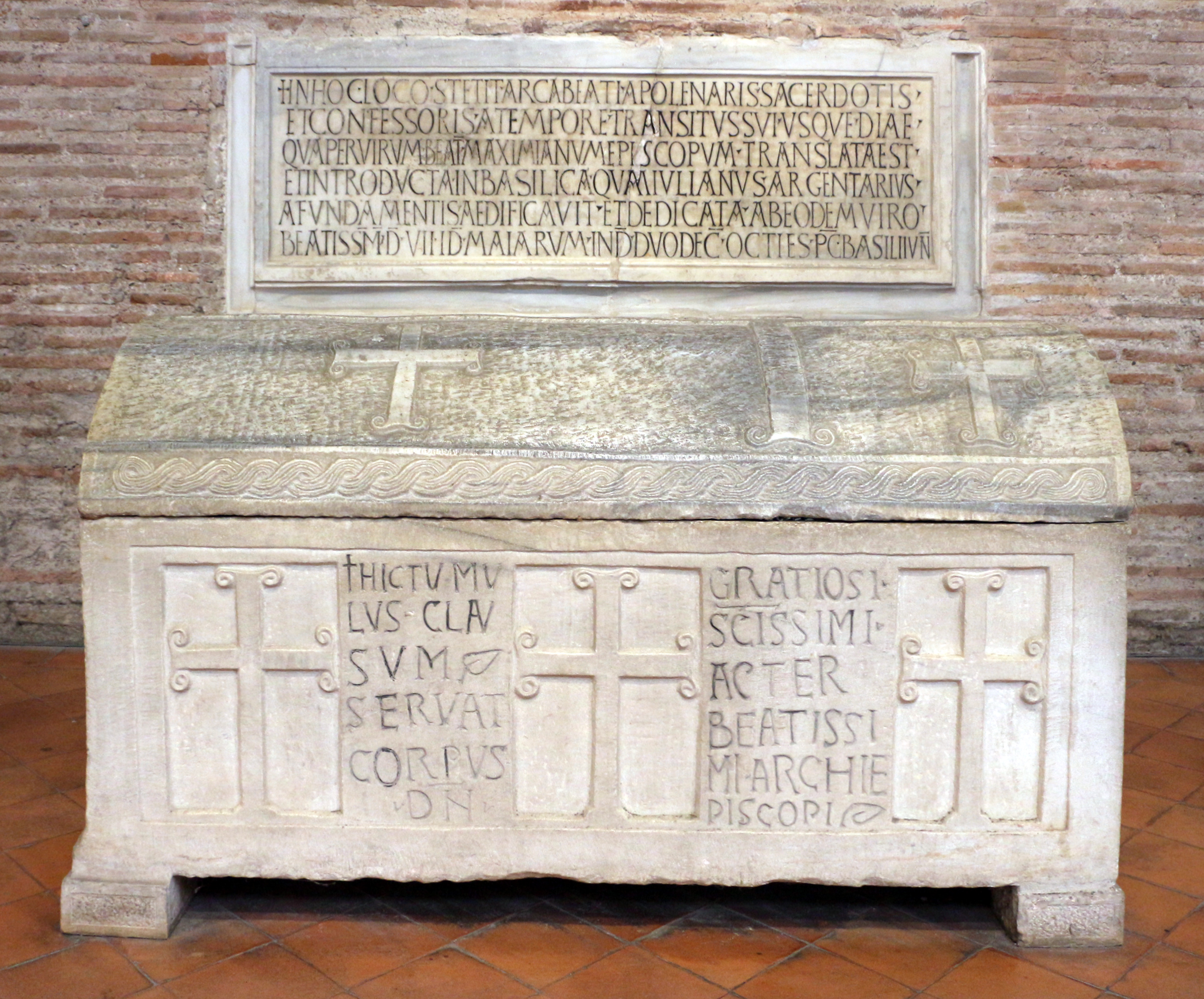
Sarcophagus of Gratiosus in Sant'Apollinare in Classe

Gratiosus (died 23 February 789) was the archbishop of Ravenna from 786 until his death.

Andreas Agnellus, in his Book of the Pontiffs of the Church of Ravenna, describes Gratiosus as balding with big eyes and a big neck. Prior to his election as archbishop, he was the abbot of Sant'Apollinare in Ravenna, near the mint and the church of Santa Croce. Under his predecessor, John VI, he served as archdeacon. He led the clergy in a dispute with the archbishop, but, owing to a lacuna in the surviving text of Agnellus, it is impossible to tell what the dispute was about.

Gratiosus came to the episcopal throne in February 786 and sat for three years and eleven days, according to Agnellus. Agnellus records only two episodes from Gratiosus' episcopate. In the first, a "deadly disaster" struck Ravenna and "bodies were strewn over the ground, which the living were hardly able to bury."

Sometime between April and June 787, after spending Easter in Rome, Charlemagne stayed in Ravenna as the guest of Gratiosus. This is the occasion for the second episode, which Joaquín Martínez Pizarro calls "one of the earliest and most interesting stories in medieval literature about the use of the vernacular". According to Agnellus, the clergy asked their unlearned archbishop to say as little as possible around the king so as not to embarrass them. Gratiosus agreed. Charlemagne was received in a formal dining room (triclinium) known as the Quinque accubitae in the episcopal complex (episcopium).

But as they were eating and drinking, the bishop began to prompt the king by saying: "pappa, my lord king, pappa." The king was astonished and asked; "What is this word that the old priest keeps saying: pappa, pappa?" Then the priests who were there with him explained: "Let the king our lord not fear that these may be words of insult or deceit; they are an invitation. This man, your servant and interlocutor, is of a great simplicity of mind, and like a mother who coaxes her children, and from her great love tries to persuade them to eat something, in the same way this man, with great affection, has invited your clemency to eat and be merry." Then the king asked all for silence and spoke out loud: "Behold the true Israelite, in whom there is no deceit." After this, the bishop obtained whatever he asked of him.

Gratiosus's episcopate was the high point Charlemagne's relations with Ravenna. After the 787 meeting, the king requested spolia from Ravenna's ancient monuments for the construction of the palace of Aachen. He had received them by the time he wintered in Aachen in 788–789.

After these two episodes, the entry for Gratiosus in Agnellus's Book of the Pontiffs is taken up by a copy of a sermon, which seems in fact to have been a sermon by Archbishop Felix of Ravenna, referred to in Felix's entry but copied into the narrative, for whatever reason, under Gratiosus.

Gratiosus died on 23 February 789 and was buried in the basilica of Sant'Apollinare in Classe. His marble sarcophagus has a semicylindrical lid with a guilloché pattern on the edge. It is decorated with crosses ending in volutes on the sides and the lid. It has a Latin epitaph carved in simple letters, which reads: "This tomb preserves enclosed the body of our lord Gratiosus, most holy and thrice most blessed archbishop". Unlike the sarcophagus of Felix but like his immediate predecessor's, that of Gratiosus was produced locally for him and was not a recycled ancient sarcophagus. It still lies in Sant'Apollinare. The election to replace him was disputed.

== Works cited ==
- Cabaniss, Allen (1972). Charlemagne. Twayne Publishers.
- Deliyannis, Deborah Mauskopf, ed. (2004). Agnellus of Ravenna: The Book of the Pontiffs of the Church of Ravenna. The Catholic University of America Press.
- Deliyannis, Deborah Mauskopf (2010). Ravenna in Late Antiquity. Cambridge University Press.
- Herrin, Judith (2020). Ravenna: Capital of Empire, Crucible of Europe. Princeton University Press.
- Lawrence, Marion (1945). The Sarcophagi of Ravenna. L'Erma di Bretschneider.
- Martínez Pizarro, Joaquín (1989). A Rhetoric of the Scene: Dramatic Narrative in the Early Middle Ages. University of Toronto Press.
- Martínez Pizarro, Joaquín (1995). Writing Ravenna: The Liber Pontificalis of Andreas Agnellus. University of Michigan Press.
- Nelson, Jinty (2016). "Charlemagne and Ravenna". In Jinty Nelson; Judith Herrin (eds.). Ravenna: Its Role in Earlier Medieval Change and Exchange. University of London Press. pp. 239–252. JSTOR j.ctv512x7n.18.
- Schoolman, Edward M. (2013). "Reassessing the Sarcophagi of Ravenna". Dumbarton Oaks Papers. 67: 49–74. JSTOR 43916676.
- West-Harling, Veronica (2020). Rome, Ravenna, and Venice, 750–1000: Byzantine Heritage, Imperial Present, and the Construction of City Identity. Oxford University Press.
