= Zosimus (martyr) =

Early Christian martyr

Saint Zosimus

Martyr
- Born: 93; Greece
- Died: 110; Italy
- Venerated in: Catholic Church
- Major shrine: Italy
- Feast: 19 June
- Catholic cult suppressed: 455

Zosimus (Greek: Ζωσιμος) was a Christian martyr who was executed in Spoleto, Umbria, Italy, during the reign of Emperor Trajan. His feast day is June 19.
