= Severinus, Exuperius, and Felician =

Saints Severinus, Exuperius, and Felician

Martyrs
- Died: 170; Vienne, Gaul
- Venerated in: Roman Catholic Church, Eastern Orthodox Church
- Canonized: Pre-congregation
- Feast: 19 November

Saints Severinus, Exuperius, and Felician were martyrs put to death under Roman Emperor Marcus Aurelius at Vienne, Gaul in 170 AD.
