= Ptolemaeus and Lucius =

Christian saints

Saints Ptolemaeus and Lucius

Martyrs
- Died: ~165 AD; Rome
- Venerated in: Roman Catholic Church
- Canonized: Pre-congregation
- Feast: October 19

Ptolemaeus and Lucius (died ca. 165 AD) are venerated as Christian martyrs and saints, who died during the reign of Marcus Aurelius.

== Biography ==
According to an early account by St. Justin Martyr, Ptolemaeus converted a promiscuous woman to Christianity, teaching her to live in chastity. The woman left her husband. Ptolemaeus was then accused by the woman's husband of engaging in improper behavior with her. Ptolemaeus was brought before the prefect Lollius Urbic(i)us at Rome and was thrown into prison. He was later executed.

Lucius was a man who protested against Ptolemaeus' sentence. He argued that Ptolemaeus had not been found guilty of any crime, and argued that Ptolemaeus was innocent of the charges brought against him (adultery, sexual immorality, murder, clothes stealing, robbery), challenging the honor of the prefect, the emperor, and the Senate. Lucius dangerously maintained that the sentence that had been imposed was unworthy of all of them. Lucius was then executed. Justin writes about a third, unnamed martyr: "Next, a third man also deserted [i.e. disagreed with the sentence] and was sentenced to be punished." Justin's description of the martyrdom of these three people in his Second Apology is one of the oldest authentic reports of martyrdom at Rome.
