= Paternus of Auch =

Saint Paternus of Auch

Bishop of Auch
- Born: Bilbao, Hispania Tarraconensis, Roman Empire
- Died: 150; Auch, Gallia Aquitania, Roman Empire
- Venerated in: Roman Catholic Church, Eastern Orthodox Church
- Canonized: pre-congregation
- Feast: 28 September

Saint Paternus was the Bishop of Auch, although born a Basque.
