= Ravenna Cathedral =

Roman Catholic cathedral in Ravenna, Italy

Coordinates: 44.4156°N 12.1966°E

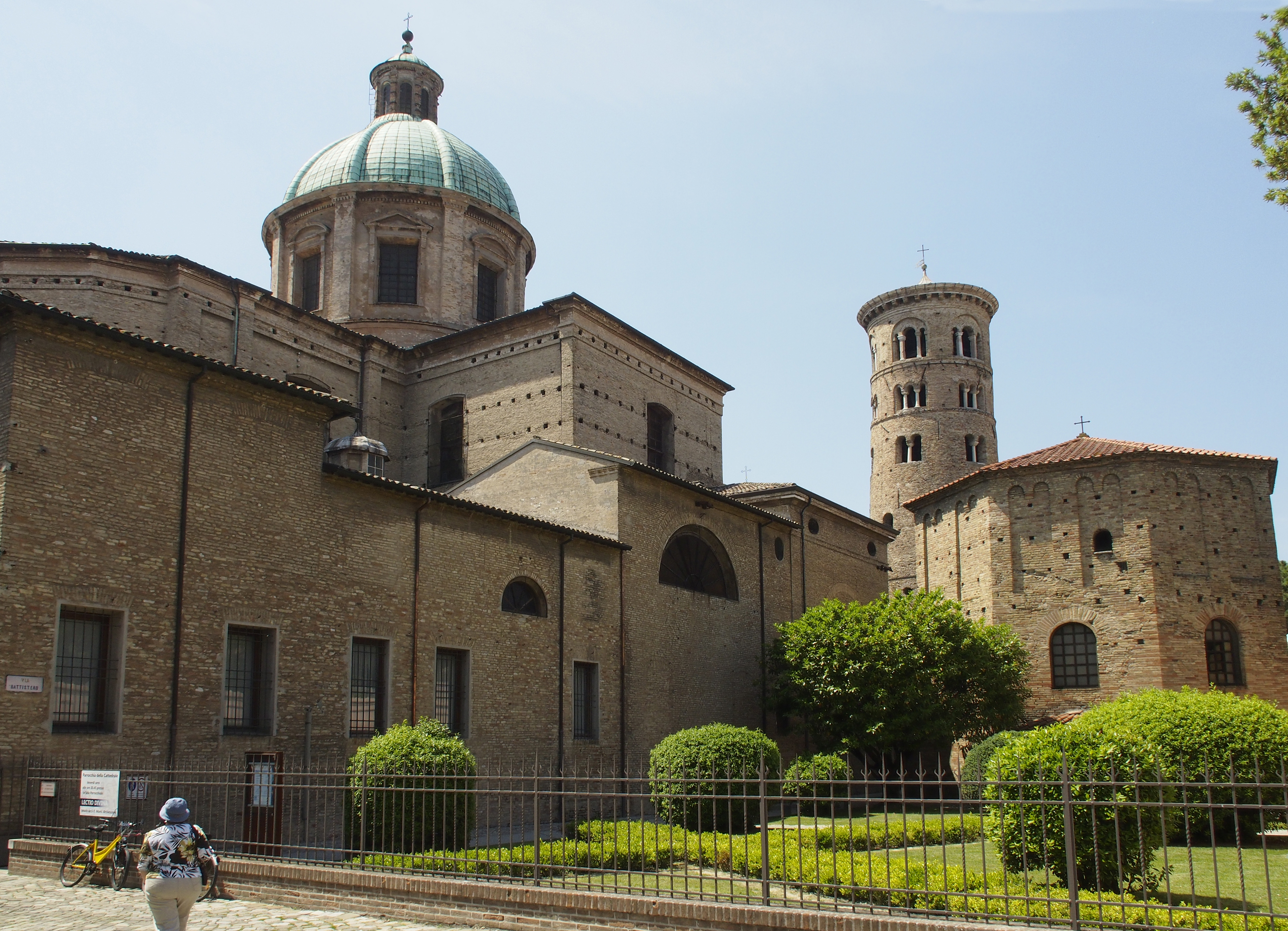
Ravenna Cathedral

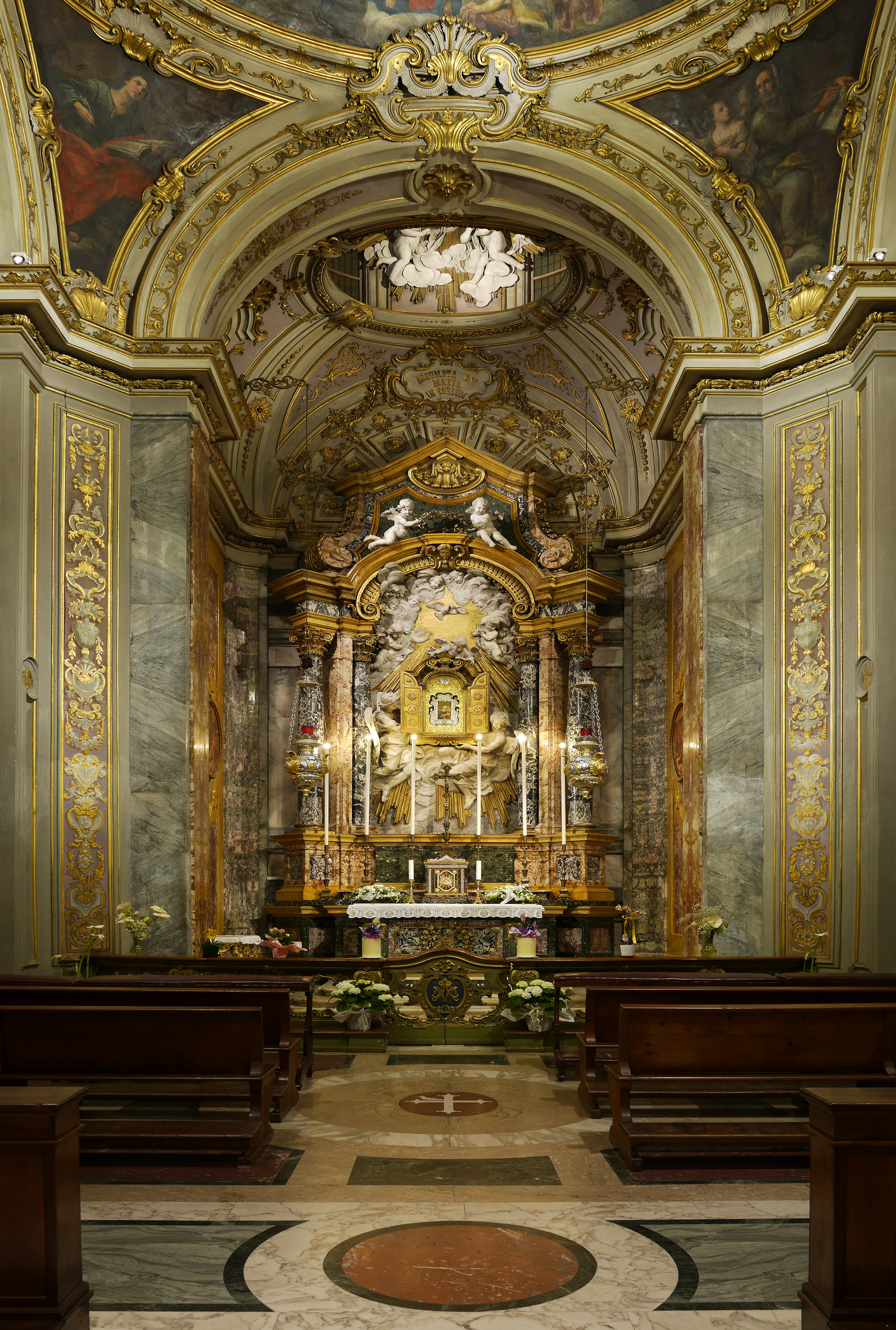
Interior of the Cappella della Madonna del Sudore

Ravenna Cathedral or Metropolitan Cathedral of the Resurrection of Our Lord Jesus Christ (Italian: Cattedrale metropolitana della Risurrezione di Nostro Signore Gesù Cristo; Duomo di Ravenna) is a Roman Catholic cathedral dedicated to the Resurrection of Jesus Christ in the city of Ravenna, Italy. Formerly the archiepiscopal seat of the Archdiocese of Ravenna, it is now the seat of the archbishops of Ravenna-Cervia.

It was granted the status of a minor basilica by Pope John XXIII on 7 October 1960. It is the seat of the parish of San Giovanni in Fonte belonging to the Urban Vicariate of the archdiocese of Ravenna-Cervia.

== History ==
The original cathedral was built during the early 5th century by the bishop Ursus of Ravenna and was originally called the Basilica Ursiana. During the Battle of Ravenna in April 1512, the basilica was sacked. In the 18th century, it was rebuilt in the Baroque style. The cathedral houses the sarcophagi of Maximianus of Ravenna, Exuperantius of Ravenna, and Barbatianus of Ravenna, and once housed the Throne of Maximian.

On the top of the belltower there are four bells in the chord of D minor.
