= Peter Chrysologus =

Bishop of Ravenna

Saint Peter Chrysologus
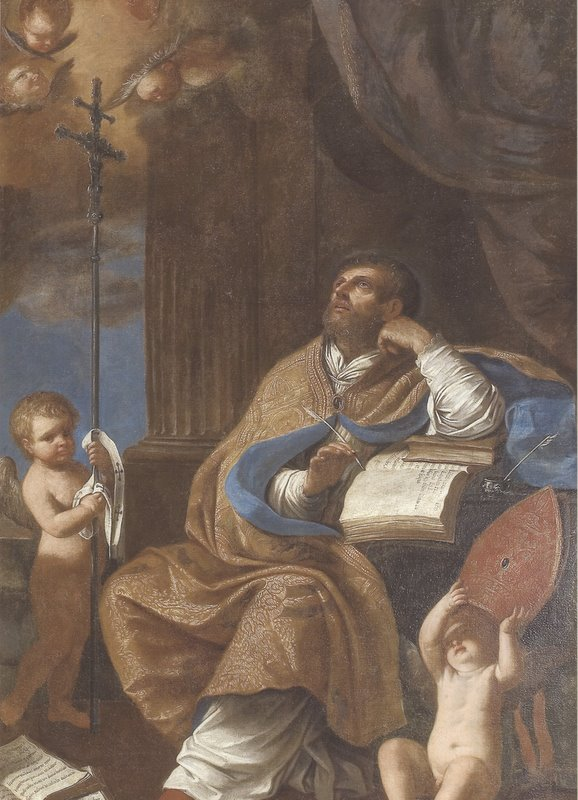
- Saint Peter Chrysologus by School of Guercino, 17th cent.

Bishop, Confessor, and Doctor of the Church
- Born: c. 380; Imola, Aemilia, Roman Empire
- Died: 31 July 450; Imola, Aemilia, Roman Empire
- Venerated in: Catholic Church, Eastern Orthodox Church, Anglicanism
- Canonized: Pre-Congregation
- Feast: 30 July; 4 December (General Roman Calendar 1729–1969)

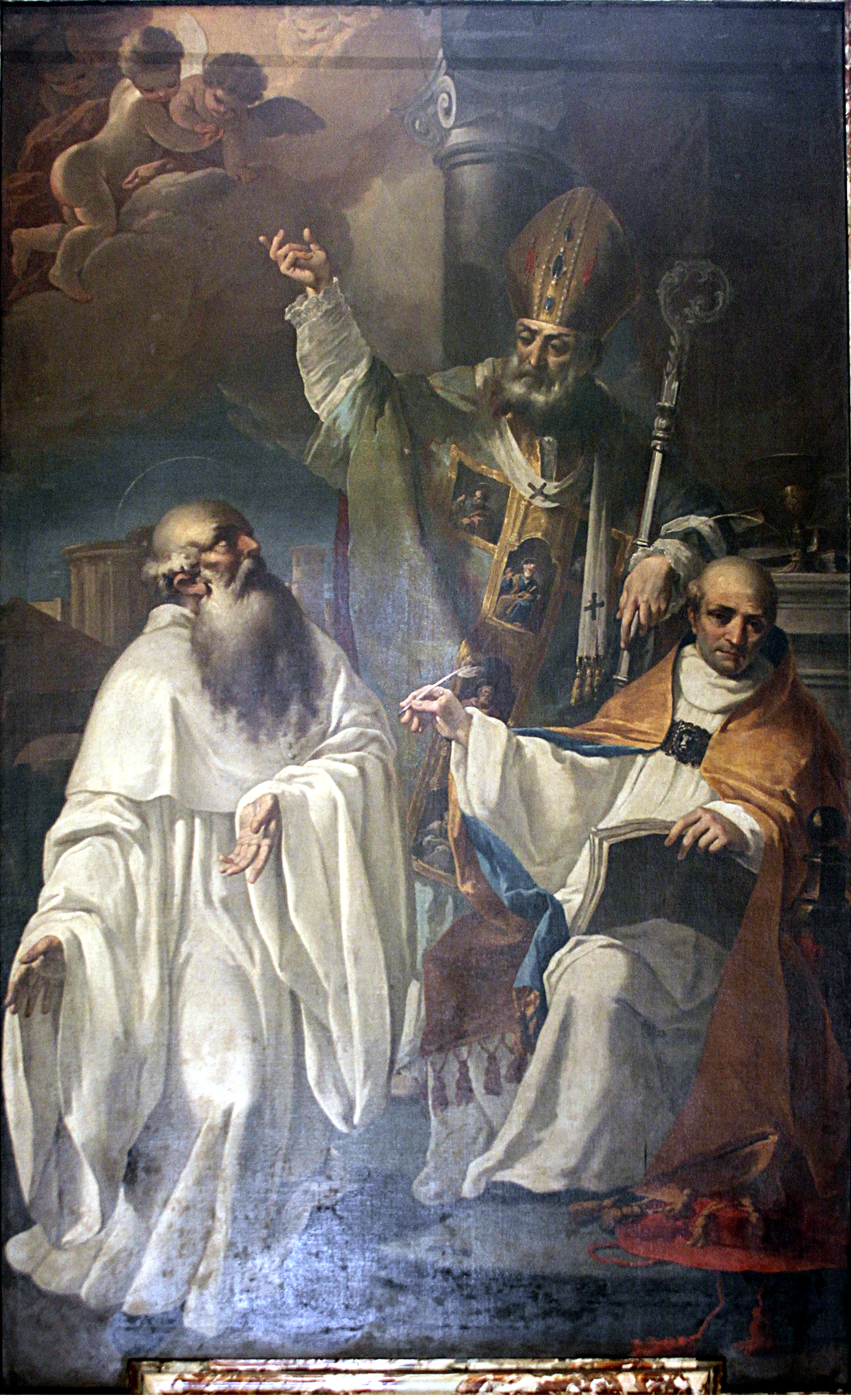
Saints Peter Chrysologus, Romuald and Peter Damian by Giuseppe Milani in Ravenna Cathedral

Peter Chrysologus (Greek: Ἅγιος Πέτρος ὁ Χρυσολόγος, Petros Chrysologos, "Peter the Golden-worded"; c. 380 – c. 450) was an Italian Christian prelate who served as Bishop of Ravenna from about 433 until his death. He is known as the "Doctor of Homilies" for the concise but theologically rich reflections he delivered during his time as the Bishop of Ravenna.

He is revered as a saint by the Catholic Church and the Eastern Orthodox Church; he was declared a Doctor of the Church by Pope Benedict XIII in 1729.

== Life ==
Peter was born in Imola, where the local bishop Cornelius baptized him, educated him, and ordained him a deacon. He was made an archdeacon through the influence of Emperor Valentinian III. Pope Sixtus III appointed Peter as Bishop of Ravenna circa 433, apparently rejecting the candidate whom the people of the city of Ravenna elected. At that time Ravenna was the capital of the West, and there are indications that Ravenna held the rank of metropolitan before this time.

The traditional account, as recorded in the Roman Breviary, is that Sixtus had a vision of Pope Peter the Apostle and Apollinaris of Ravenna, the first bishop of that see, who showed Peter, a young man, the next Bishop of Ravenna. When a group from Ravenna arrived, including Cornelius and his archdeacon Peter from Imola, Sixtus recognized Peter as the young man in his vision and consecrated him as a bishop.

People knew Peter Chrysologus, the Doctor of Homilies, for his very simple and short but inspired sermons, for he was afraid of fatiguing the attention of his hearers. His piety and zeal won universal admiration. After hearing oratory of his first homily as bishop, Roman Empress Galla Placidia supposedly gave him the surname Chrysologus, meaning "golden-worded." His sermons are historically significant in that they reveal Christian life in fifth-century Ravenna. The Emperor's mother, Galla Placidia, patronized many projects of Bishop Peter.

In his extant homilies, Bishop Peter explained Biblical texts briefly and concisely. He also condemned Arianism and Monophysitism as heresies and explained the Apostles' Creed, the mystery of the Incarnation, and other topics in simple and clear language. He dedicated a series of homilies to John the Baptist and the Mary, mother of Jesus. Peter advocated daily reception of Eucharist. He urged his listeners to confide in the forgiveness offered through Christ. His surviving works attest to the Catholic Church's traditional beliefs about Mary's perpetual virginity, the penitential value of Lent, Christ's Eucharistic presence, and the primacy of St. Peter and his successors. He shared the confidence of Pope Leo I the Great (440-461), another Doctor of the Church.

A synod held in Constantinople in 448 condemned Eutyches for Monophysitism; Eutyches then appealed to Peter Chrysologus but failed in his endeavour to win the support of the Bishop. The Acts of the Council of Chalcedon (451) preserves the text of letter of Peter Chrysologus in response to Eutyches; Peter admonishes Eutyches to accept the ruling of the synod and to give obedience to the Bishop of Rome as the successor of Peter the Apostle.

Archbishop Felix of Ravenna in the early eighth century collected and preserved 176 of his homilies. Various authors edited and translated these works into numerous languages.

== Death and veneration ==
St Peter died circa 450 during a visit to Imola, the town of his birth. Older reference books say he died on 2 December, but a more recent interpretation of the ninth-century "Liber Pontificalis Ecclesiae Ravennatis" indicated that he died on 31 July.

When in 1729 he was declared a Doctor of the Church, his feast day, not already included in the Tridentine calendar, was inserted in the General Roman Calendar for celebration on 4 December. In 1969 his feast was moved to 30 July, as close as possible to the day of his death, 31 July, the feast day of Ignatius of Loyola.

A contemporary portrait of Peter Chrysologus, found in the mosaics of the Church of San Giovanni Evangelista in Ravenna, depicts him among the members of the eastern and western imperial family, showing his extraordinary influence.

=== Feast days ===
- 30 July – main commemoration
- 2 December – death anniversary (older tradition)
- 3 December – orthodox commemoration
- 4 December – Traditional catholic commemoration

== Works ==
There are three volumes of "selected sermons" in the "Fathers of the Church" series (17, 109 and 110), published by the Catholic University of America Press. Despite the title, this includes all the genuine sermons. There is also a recent 2020 volume from Routledge containing a number of his sermons, translated by David Vincent Meconi Jr.

== See also ==
- Saint Peter Chrysologus, patron saint archive

== Bibliography ==
- Otto Bardenhewer, Patrology, tr. Shanan, pp. 526 ff.
- Dapper, Der hl. Petrus von Ravenna Chrysologus, Posen, 1871
- Looshorn, Der hl. Petrus Chrysologus und seine Schriflen in Zeitschrift f. kathol. Theol., III, 1879, pp. 238 ff.
- Wayman, Zu Petrus Chrysologus in Philologus, LV (1896), pp. 464 ff.
- San Pietro Crisologo, Sermoni, two volumes, Città Nuova, Roma 1997
