= Grazioso da Padova =

Italian composer

Grazioso da Padova or Gratiosus de Padua (fl. 1391–1407) was an Italian composer of the Middle Ages and early Renaissance.

== Life and career ==
A priest, Gratiosus was active in the chapter at Padua Cathedral where a document from 1391 indicates he was custos and by 8 June 1392 mansionarius. A "Gracioso" is listed as a monk of the Abbey of Santa Giustina in 1398; whether this man is the composer is unclear, but every one of Grazioso's compositions is found in a fragment from the Abbey.

== Music ==
Of his output only three fragments remain, two sacred and one secular. He wrote two three-voice settings of portions of the Mass, a Gloria and a Sanctus, as well as ballata (Alta regina de virtute ornata). Stylistic characteristics – a mix of French and Italian traits – indicate he may have been acquainted with Johannes Ciconia, a northerner who spent some time in Padua during the period when Grazioso was active there. The inventiveness of his "French" Gloria was praised by Layton while the "Italian" Sanctus was criticized for a "poverty of melodic invention"; these characteristics were disputed by Cuthbert on the basis of recent discoveries of Italian Mass movements.

== See also ==
- Music of the Trecento
