= Archdiocese of Ravenna-Cervia =

Roman Catholic archdiocese in Italy

Coordinates: 44.4167°N 12.2000°E

Archdiocese of Ravenna-Cervia Archidioecesis Ravennatensis-Cerviensis Arcidiocesi di Ravenna-Cervia

Catholic
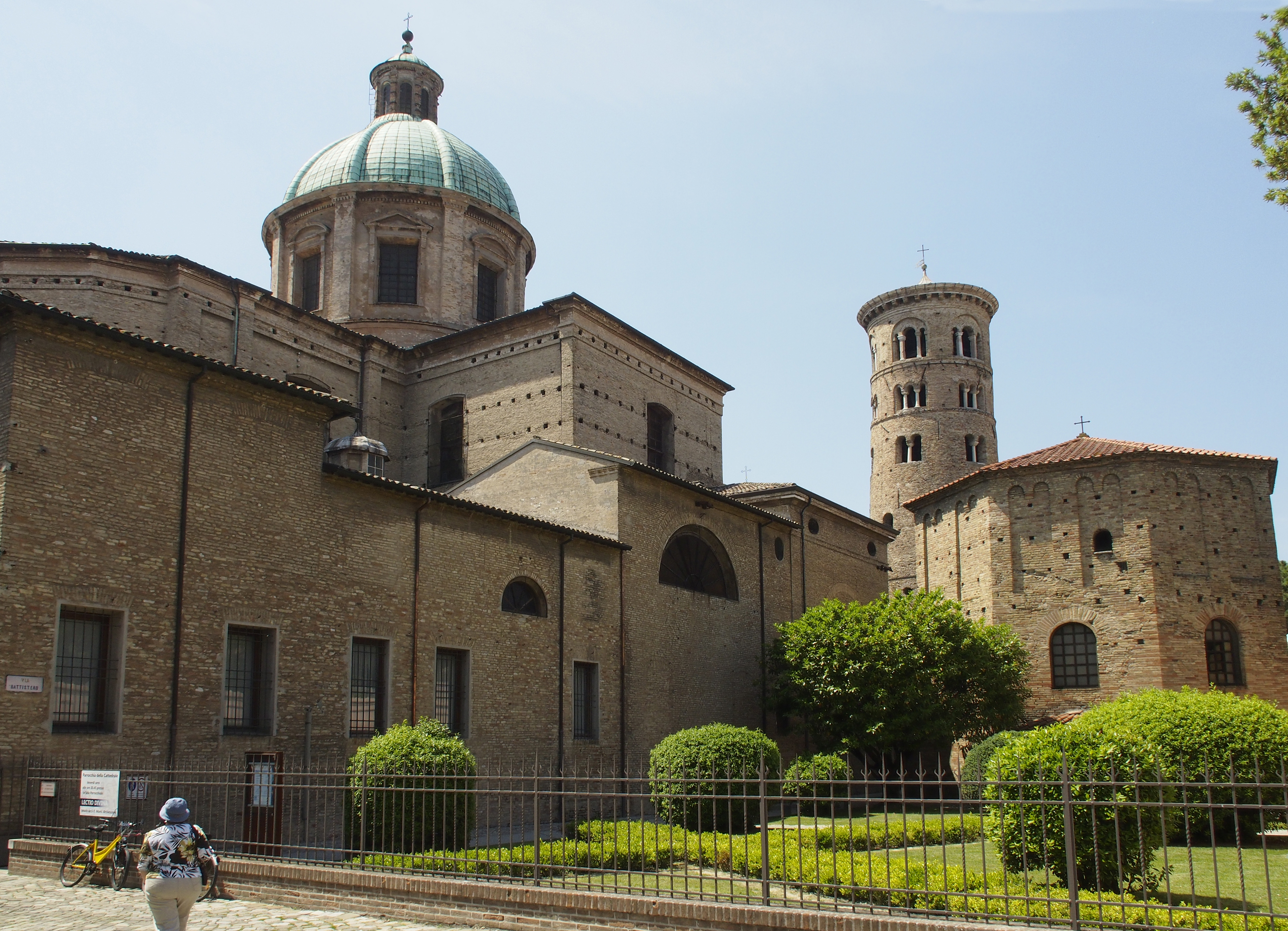
- Ravenna Cathedral

Location
- Country: Italy
- Ecclesiastical province: Ravenna-Cervia

Statistics
- Area: 1,185 km^{2} (458 sq mi)
- Population: Total; Catholics: (as of 2023); 215,600 (est.) ▼; 193,400 (est.) ▼
- Parishes: 88 ▼

Information
- Denomination: Catholic Church
- Rite: Roman Rite
- Established: 1st century
- Cathedral: Cathedral of the Resurrection of Our Lord Jesus Christ, Ravenna
- Co-cathedral: Cathedral of St. Peter, Cervia
- Secular priests: 57 (diocesan) ▼22 (Religious Orders) ▲13 Permanent Deacons

Current leadership
- Pope: Leo XIV
- Archbishop: Lorenzo Ghizzoni

Website
- www.ravenna-cervia.chiesacattolica.it

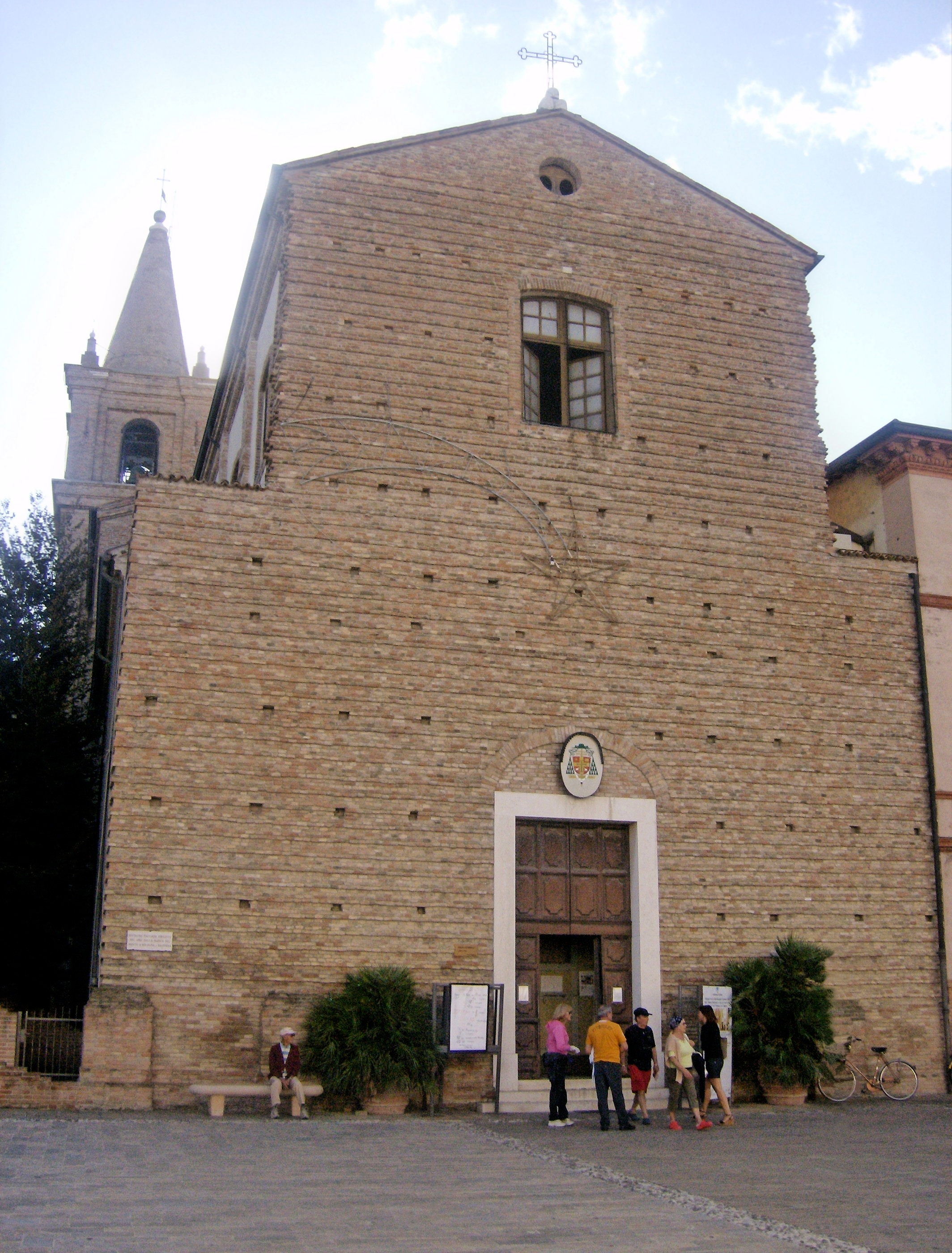
Cervia Cathedral

The Archdiocese of Ravenna-Cervia (Latin: Archidioecesis Ravennatensis-Cerviensis) is an archdiocese of the Catholic Church. It is a metropolitan see of the Latin Church, located in the Emilia-Romagna region of Italy.

The cathedral of the archdiocese is the Cathedral Basilica of the Resurrection of Our Lord in Ravenna. There is a co-cathedral in Cervia, the Concattedrale di Santa Maria Assunta ('co‑cathedral of the Assumption of Santa Maria'), which had formerly been the Cervia Cathedral.

Following the appointment by Pope Benedict XVI and in succession to Giuseppe Verucchi, Lorenzo Ghizzoni has been the metropolitan archbishop of the archdiocese since 17 November 2012.

== History ==
The Archdiocese of Ravenna was a Roman Catholic diocese in Emilia-Romagna, Italy. The diocese was elevated to an archdiocese in the 6th century. Among its famous archbishops are Saint Peter Chrysologus, a Doctor of the Church, and Saint Guido Maria Conforti, who was canonized as a saint in 2011 by Pope Benedict XVI. The early medieval Ravenna papyri form an important record from the church's chancery between the 5th and 10th century.

The archdiocese of Ravenna-Cervia was created in 1947 through the merger of the Archdiocese of Ravenna and the Diocese of Cervia. The archdiocese in 2014 had one priest for every 1,830 Catholics.

== See also ==
- Bishop of Ravenna, for a list of bishops
- Roman Catholic Diocese of Cervia
