= Andreas Agnellus =

Italian abbot and historian

Father Andreas Agnellus
- Title: Abbot

Personal life
- Born: Agnellus c. 794/799 Ravenna, Patrimony of Saint Peter
- Died: c. 846 Ravenna, Patrimony of Saint Peter
- Known for: Liber Pontificalis Ecclesiae Ravennatis
- Occupation: Historian

Religious life
- Religion: Roman Catholicism
- Ordination: between 817 and 835

Andreas Agnellus (c. 794/799 – after 846) was a historian of the bishops of Ravenna. The date of his death is not recorded, although his history mentions the death of archbishop George of Ravenna in 846; Oswald Holder-Egger cites a papyrus charter dated to either 854 or 869 that contains the name of a priest named Andreas of the Church of Ravenna, but there is no evidence to connect him with Andreas Agnellus.

== Life and writings ==
Though called Abbot, first of St. Mary of Blachernae, and, later, of St. Bartholomew, Andreas appears to have remained a secular priest, being probably only titular abbot of each abbey. He is best known as the author of the Liber Pontificalis Ecclesiae Ravennatis (LPR), an account of the occupants of his native church, compiled on the model of the Liber Pontificalis, a compilation of the lives of the Popes of Rome. The work survives in two manuscripts: one in the Biblioteca Estense in Modena, written in 1413; the other is in the Vatican Library, written in the mid-16th century and breaks off in the middle of the life of Archbishop Peter II. Copies of Agnellus's lives of two saintly bishops of Ravenna, Severus and Peter Chrysologus, exist in independent traditions, copied into collections of saints' lives.

The editio princeps of the LPR was published in Modena by Benedetto Bacchini in 1708; a complete English translation of the LPR by Deborah Mauskopf Deliyannis was published in 2004. The LPR begins with Saint Apollinaris and ends with Georgius, the forty-eighth archbishop (died 846). Though the work contains "unreliable material" according to the article on Agnellus in the Catholic Encyclopedia, Thomas Shahan (the author of the article) states that the LPR is "a unique and rich source of information concerning the buildings, inscriptions, manners, and religious customs of Ravenna in the ninth century". Deliyannis notes that "two themes recur throughout the LPR: an anxiety for the rights of the clergy in the face of oppression by bishops, and a firm preference for the autocephaly of Ravenna, with a particular dislike of control of [the archbishopric of] Ravenna by the Roman pope". The Catholic Encyclopedia further comments that "in his efforts to be erudite he often falls into unpardonable errors. The diction is barbarous, and the text is faulty and corrupt".
