= Kaper Koraon Treasure =

Byzantine silver treasure

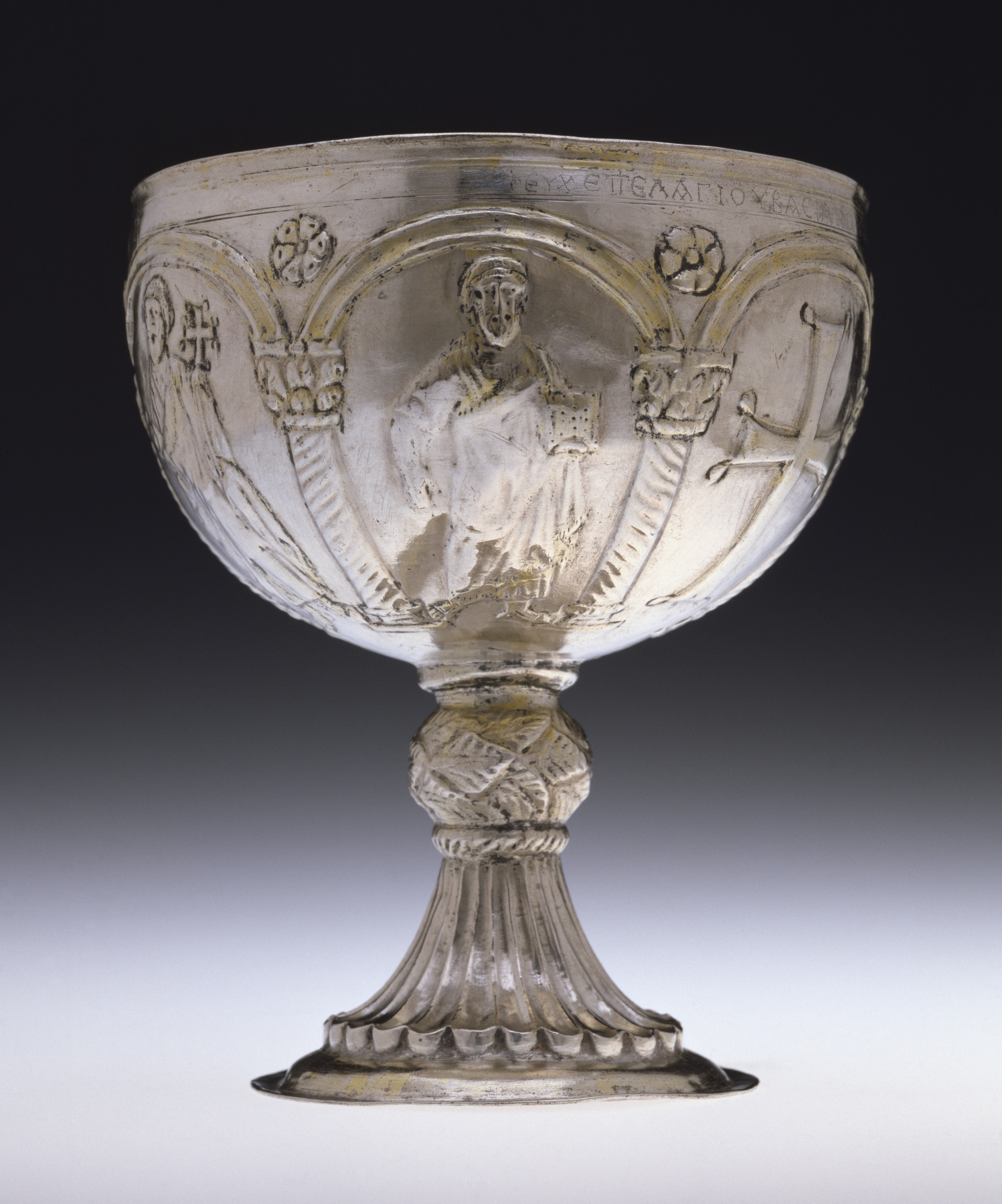
An example piece from the Kaper Koraon Treasure.

The Kaper Koraon Treasure is a Byzantine silver treasure consisting of 56 individual silver items originating from Syria in the sixth and seventh centuries.

== History ==
The treasure was re-discovered between 1908 and 1910. It was originally believed to have belonged to the church in Antioch, a thriving Roman city on the Mediterranean. It can now be argued that the items come from a larger collection of silver from the church of Saint Sergios in modern-day Kurin, Syria or that the pieces belonged to a small local church. The final items of the collection were likely interred at the site in the seventh century as the Byzantine Empire subsequently lost this area of Syria to the Persian army. The later conquering by the Muslim Arab army permanently removed the area from Byzantine control.

It is believed that the Persian and Muslim Arab take-overs were relatively peaceful as historic sites around the area show little to no damage that could be attributed to that time. Though religion began to shift following the change of power and Christian artifacts were increasingly stored away from public viewing, the area did continue to benefit from relative wealth and prosperity, creating many secular works. The real halt to production of silver treasures is thought to have followed a plague throughout the area from 542 to 544. This had a lasting impact on the economic status of the region.

There is evidence that this accumulation of local wealth in silver objects was common throughout the area leading up to the Persian control and the sixth century plague. Similar treasures have been found at Stuma, Riha, Hama, and Antioch to name a few.

The objects found in the Kaper Koraon treasure were not originally prestigious shrine gifts but were likely relatively cheap imitations made specifically for a village church. This can be clearly seen from recent investigations into the pieces which have shown high quantities of copper and other metals melted in with the silver to increase malleability and decrease production costs. It is estimated that these items were the collective donations from five local families over a period of at least three decades. Many of the stamps present on the pieces are believed to have been added after production and some note the specific donors of each piece.

== Notable pieces ==
The Kaper Koraon treasure consists of 56 total silver objects including: eight chalices, seven patens, five crosses, one cross revetment, two lamp stands, three lamps, three ewers, one flask, one bowl, one mirror, one box, eleven spoons, one ladle, two strainers, two fans, and four plaques. The other three objects are only partial pieces of broken fragments likely from other plaques. Many of the items are religious in nature including images of the cross and Jesus's disciples. Some are believed to be secular but were stored with the church collection either for safe-keeping on behalf of the owner or stores of wealth for the parish.

Most of the silver pieces shown here still show evidence of hammering either visibly or through careful machine investigation. Due to the limited skill level of local workers and the overworking of malleable metal, many items featured here have stress fractures or chips that were original to the piece. Any repairs visible, such as the re-welding of a handle onto an ewar, are likely original and occurred before the internment of the treasure. Many of the chalices were hammered, welded together, and then lathed to smooth out the seams between the cup and the stem. Some chalices shows signs of wear at these seams and around the top rim due to the method of their construction.

Since their discovery, the items of the Kaper Koraon treasure have dispersed into public and private collections throughout the world including the Walters Art Museum.
