= Archangel ivory =

Byzantine ivory panel

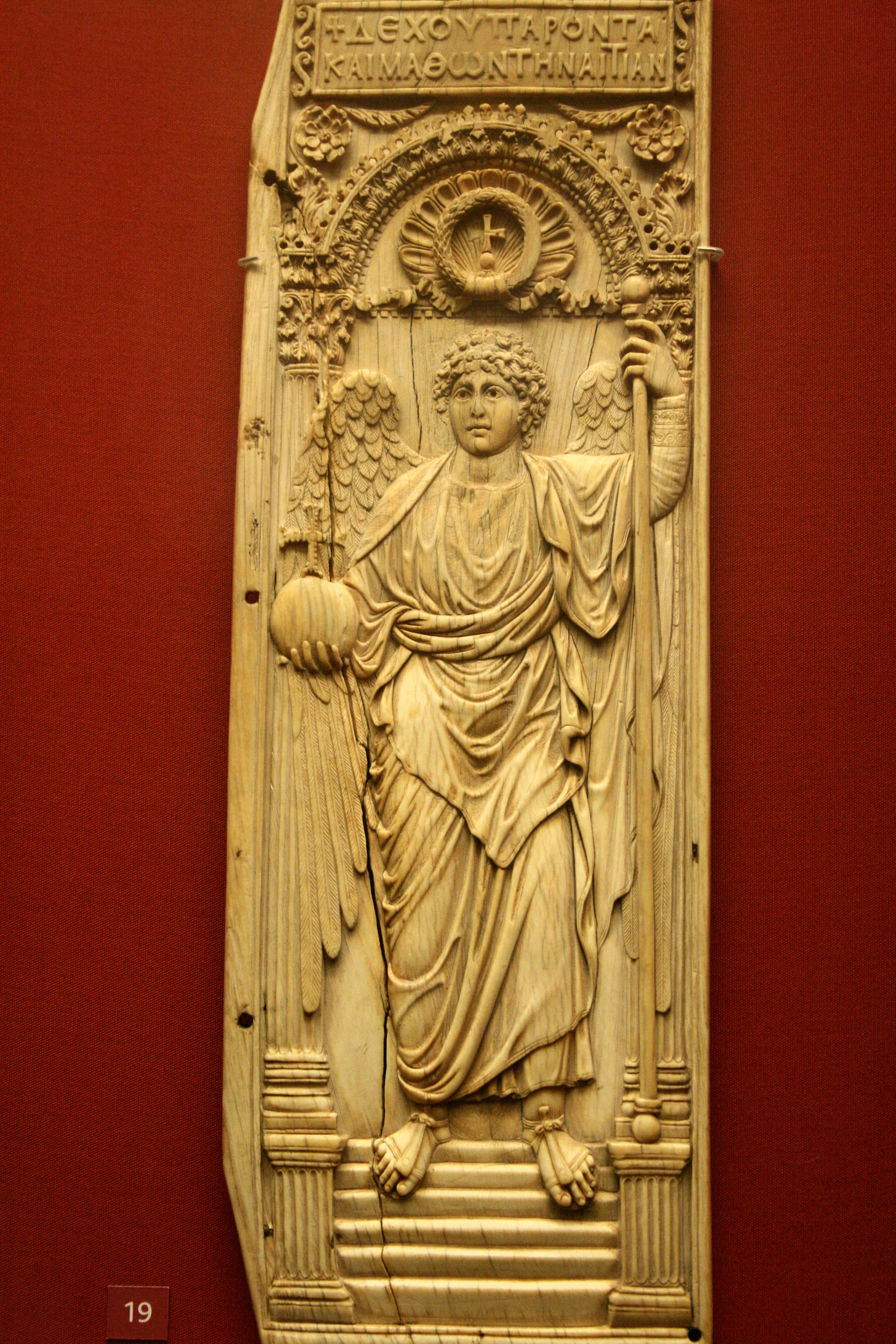
- on display in the museum
- Material: ivory
- Size: 428 x 143 mm and 9 mm thick
- Created: AD 525-550
- Place: Constantinople
- Present location: Room 41 of the British Museum, London

The Archangel ivory is the largest surviving Byzantine ivory panel, now in the British Museum in London. Dated to the early 6th century, it depicts an archangel holding a sceptre and imperial orb.

== Description ==
The archangel is usually identified as Michael, and the panel is assumed to have formed the right part of a diptych, with the lost left half possibly depicting Emperor Justinian (reigned 527–565), to whom the archangel would be offering the insignia of imperial power. The panel is the largest single piece of carved Byzantine ivory that survives, at 42.9 × 14.3 cm (16 7/8 × 5 5/8 in). It is, along with the Barberini ivory, one of two important surviving 6th-century Byzantine ivories attributed to the imperial workshops of Constantinople under Justinian, although the attribution is mostly assumed due to the size and craftsmanship.

The figure is depicted in a highly classical style, wearing Greek or Roman garb and with a youthful face and proportions conforming to the ideals of classical sculpture. The architectural space, however, is more typically Byzantine in its bending of spatial logic: the archangel's feet are at the top of a staircase that recedes from the base of the columns, but his arms and wings are in front of the columns. The feet are also not firmly planted on the steps.

There is a Greek inscription at the top, translated variously. Translated as "Receive this suppliant, despite his sinfulness", it might be an expression of humility on the part of Justinian. Interpreted as the beginning of an inscription that continues on the lost second panel, it may read, "Receive these gifts, and having learned the cause...".
