= Byzantine silver =

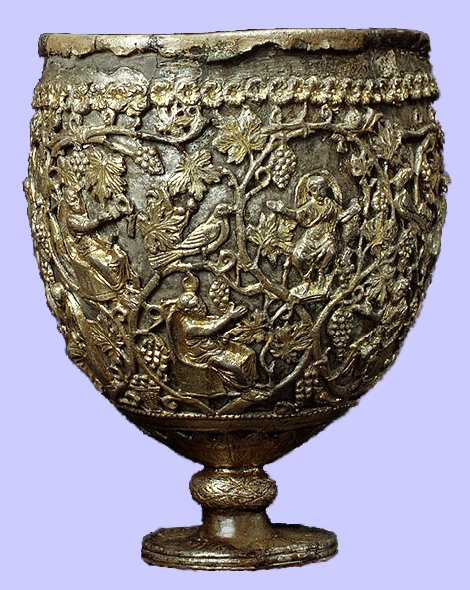
The Antioch Chalice, early sixth century. Metropolitan Museum of Art, New York.

Silver was important in Byzantine art and society more broadly as it was the most precious metal right after gold. Byzantine silver was prized in official, religious, and domestic realms. Aristocratic homes had silver dining ware, and in churches silver was used for crosses, liturgical vessels such as the patens and chalices required for every Eucharist. The imperial offices periodically issued silver coinage and regulated the use of silver through control stamps. About 1,500 silver plates and crosses survive from the Byzantine era.

== History and imperial control stamps ==
In the early Byzantine period (4th-7th centuries CE), silver vessels for domestic settings showed pagan mythological scenes and objects such as the Sevso Treasure. Luxurious silver pieces continued to be rendered in the classical style by early Byzantine artisans. At the same time, silver used in church settings depicted a range of Christian subject matter, and in later Byzantine art these subjects predominate.

Because the material was so valued, silver items were control stamped by imperial authorities, sometimes with up to five control stamps on a single piece, between the fourth and eighth centuries. During the reign of the Emperor Heraclius (r. 610-41 AD), the production of silverware halts, which coincides with the Byzantine state confiscating valuable metals to help replenish the imperial treasury during the Persian War.

== Plates ==
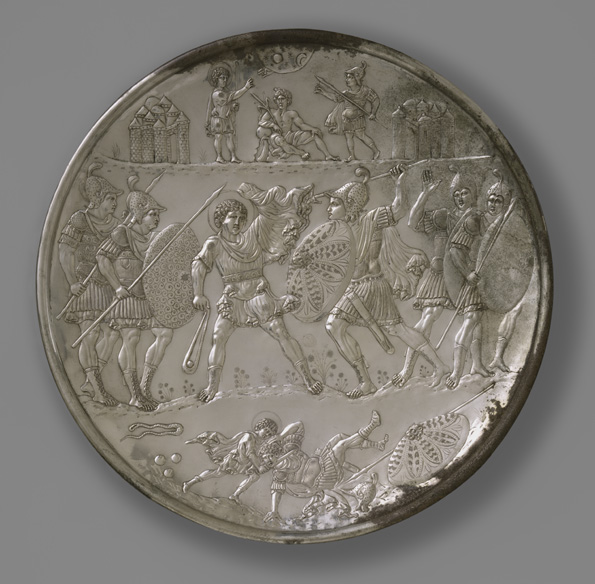
David fighting Goliath, early Byzantine silver plate, 5th-7th century, now at Metropolitan Museum, New York

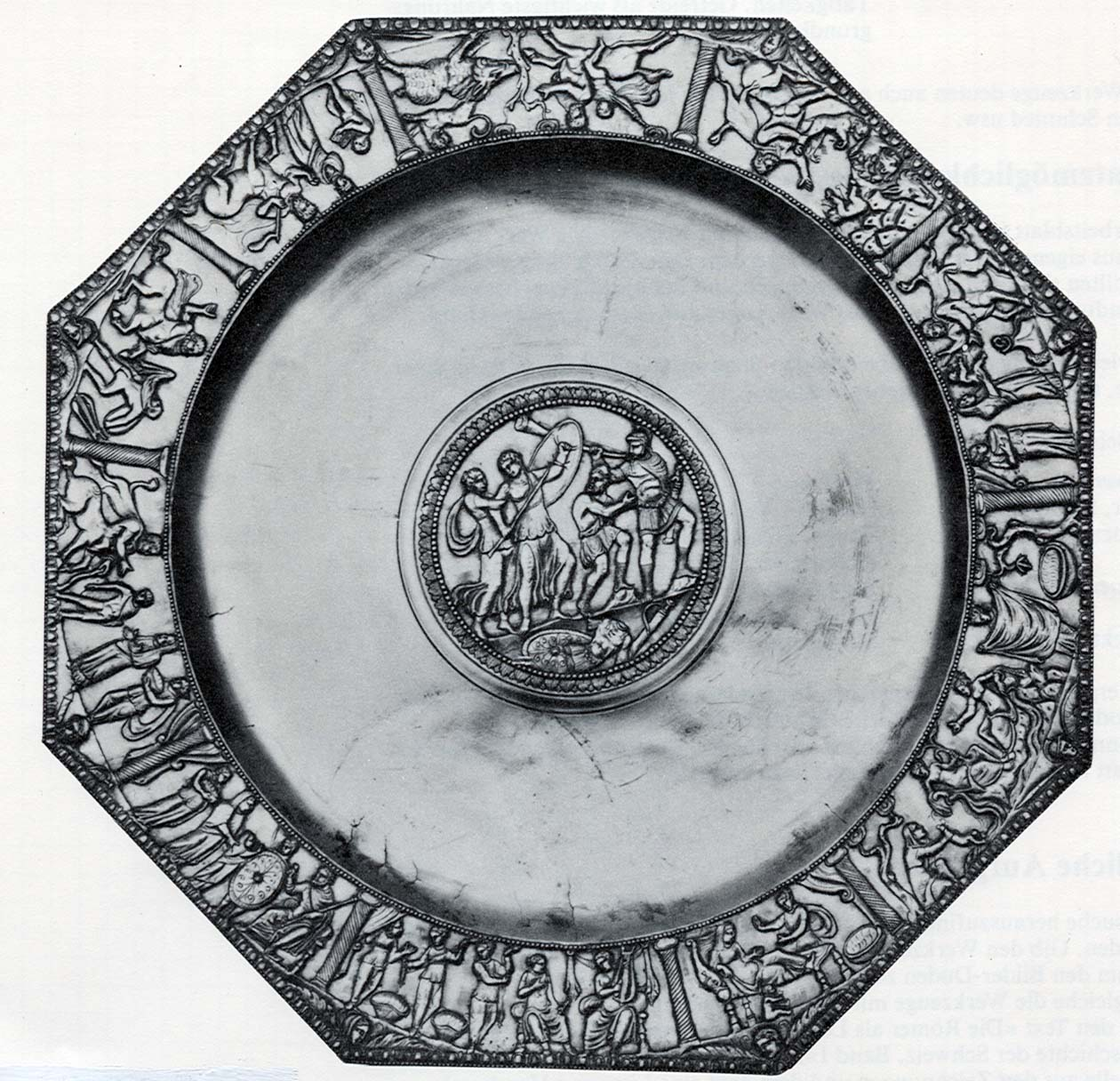
The Achilles Plate, discovered in the early 1960s, near Basel, Switzerland.

Silver plates, such as the Missorium of Theodosius I of 338 CE, and the set of nine plates showing the Life of David stamped between 613 and 630 CE, are well-studied works in Byzantine art history. The David Plates and the Achilles Plate show a tradition of late antique silver working that produced many objects between the fourth and seventh centuries with scenes from traditional classical mythology. The David Plates and Achilles Plate are very decorative, and would have been used as show pieces in a secular setting.

The Kaiseraugst Achilles Plate has the closest similarity to the David Plates in regards to late antique silver. The Achilles Plate was buried with a large hoard of domestic silver during the fourth century inside the walls of the Rhine frontier fort of Augusta Raurica, which was discovered in the early 1960s. The Achilles Plate has the signature of Pausylyps of Thessalonica, which places its manufacturing in the eastern Roman empire. This is reinforced with the similar control stamps on the David Plates. The large octagonal Achilles plate with eleven scenes on has decoration around its rim, and in the center a medallion shows a series of eleven scenes of Achilles’ life before the Trojan War.

== Crosses ==
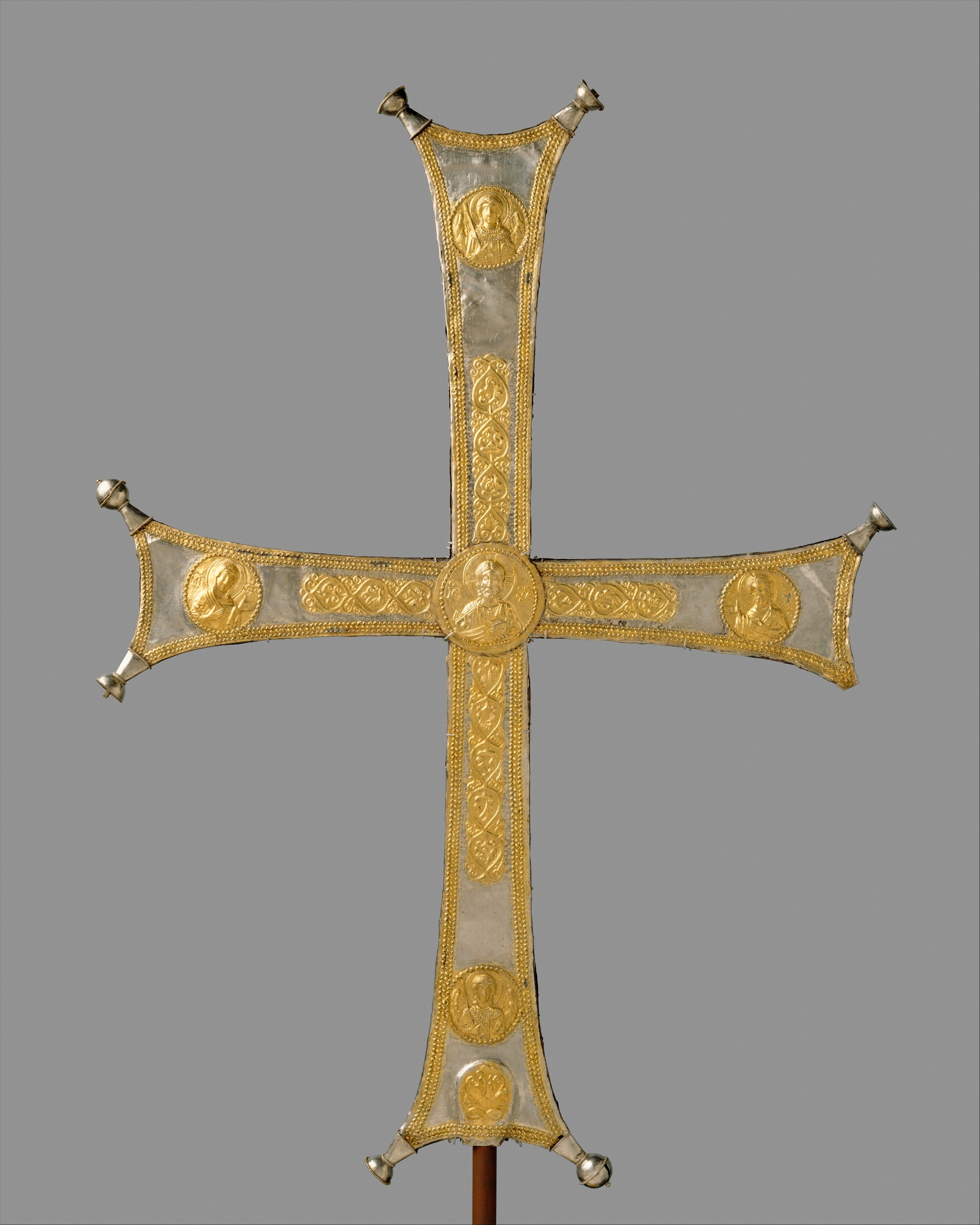
Byzantine silver-gilt cross, 11th century CE, Metropolitan Museum of Art inv. no. 1993.163

Silver crosses were also lavishly adorned with precious materials and biblical scenes during the Byzantine period. Many were used for processions during the liturgy or public events, and texts from the time such as monastic typika describe these uses. One of the best-known examples is the cross of Adrianople, now in the Benaki Museum, Athens, Greece. This cross has frontal images of Christ and the Virgin Mary, along with archangels Michael and Gabriel on the cross arms. The reverse side shows church fathers, and the donor’s name is inscribed as Sisinnios, which dates the cross to the final years of the tenth century. This 11th-century processional cross represents the kind of silver work used in military, church, and imperial processions. Its Greek inscription indicates it was a votive offering by a Bishop Leo, and probably in honor of a holy figure associated with medicine, given the unusual inclusion of St. Thalelaios (a physician saint) in a medallion on the front. This cross' medallion images of Christ, the Virgin Mary and John the Baptist are more typical. Another cross, in the Cleveland Museum of Art, is dated to the eleventh century due to its comparison of portraits with imperial portraits on coins and seal of that time. Distribution of silver-gilt relief decoration and niello are the same on both sides.

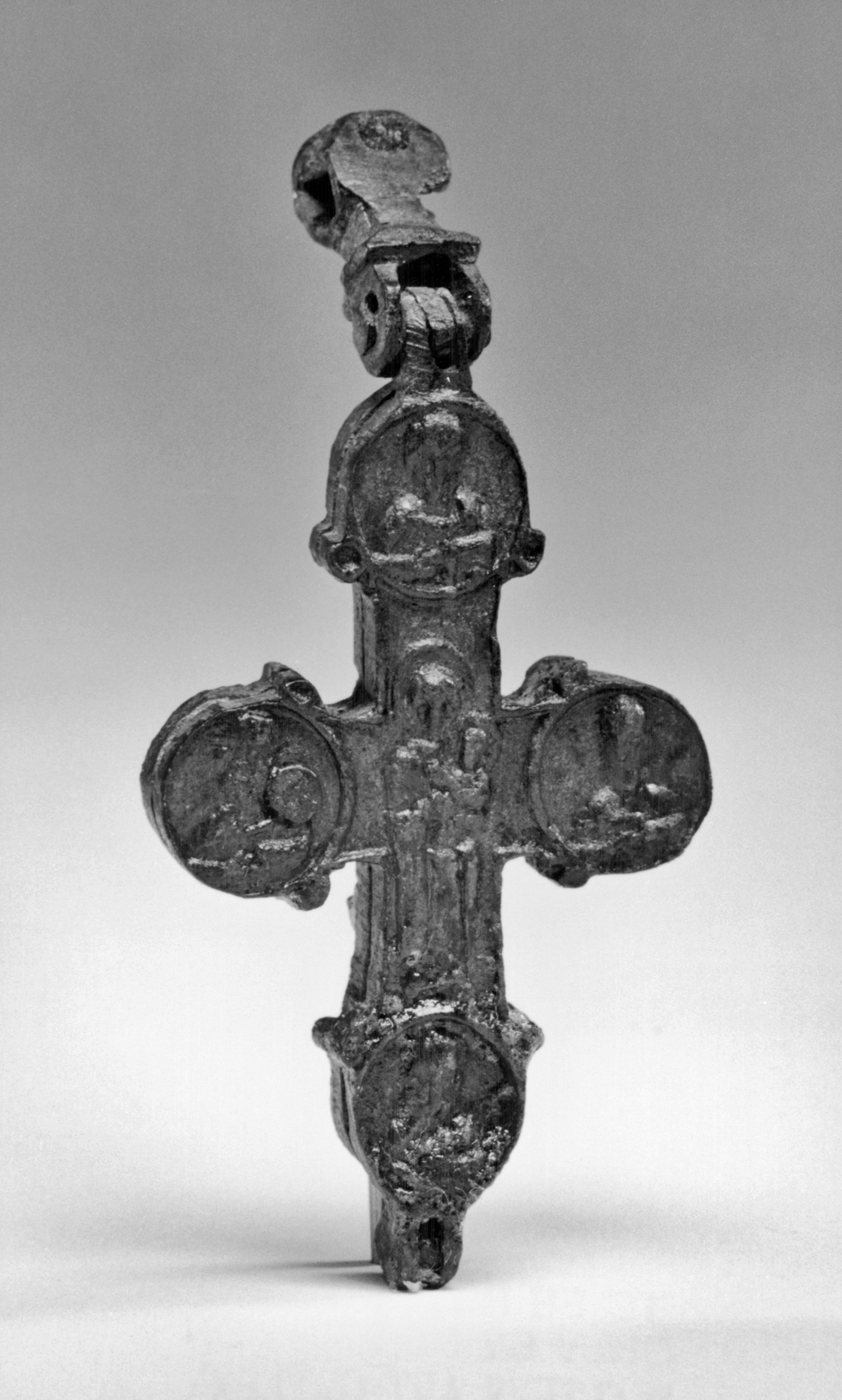
Silver cross portraying the Crucifixion and the Virgin Mary. Walters Art Museum.

One recently-discussed cross called “The Work of Mark,” due to the monk's inscriptions on the cross. The cross is dated at late tenth or early eleventh century. This cross is 47 cm high, 26 cm wide, and very ornamented meaning it was probably used in processions. The iron core of the cross is encased in silver. Points projecting from the four arms of the cross would all have had small silver-gilt balls, which can be seen on other such crosses. Traces of gilding where the balls would have been provide further evidence. On one side across the central arm are three roundels forming a deesis, which shows Christ as a central figure holding a book of gospels in his left hand and blessing with his right. The Virgin Mary is shown bowing on Christ's left while St John the Baptist bows on his right The roundel on the top arm portrays the Archangel Michael, while the bottom roundel portrays a figure titled St Theodore. This side is heavily embossed with silver-gilt, and has a vine scroll and beaded border. The reverse side does not have such borders. The reverse has a black medium used in conjunction with the partial gilding of niello, which is an enamel type substance, in this case mixed with sulphur and silver. The roundels portray saints with the top of the cross showing the evangelist St John Theologos. The arm roundels show St Peter on the left and St Paul on the right. The fourth roundel shows St Basil in bishops robes. The middle of the scene has Virgin Mary and her child with a standing portrait of St Constantine above them decorated in his robe. The Virgin Mary has St Demetrius on the left, St Procopius on her right, and the last saint shown is St Nikitas. All saints are identified by the engraving of their names above them. An inscription of a semicircular area just 3 cm wide and embedded into the front of the cross, before the tang projects, reads “‘The work of the Faithful Mark’”

== Modern Recovery ==
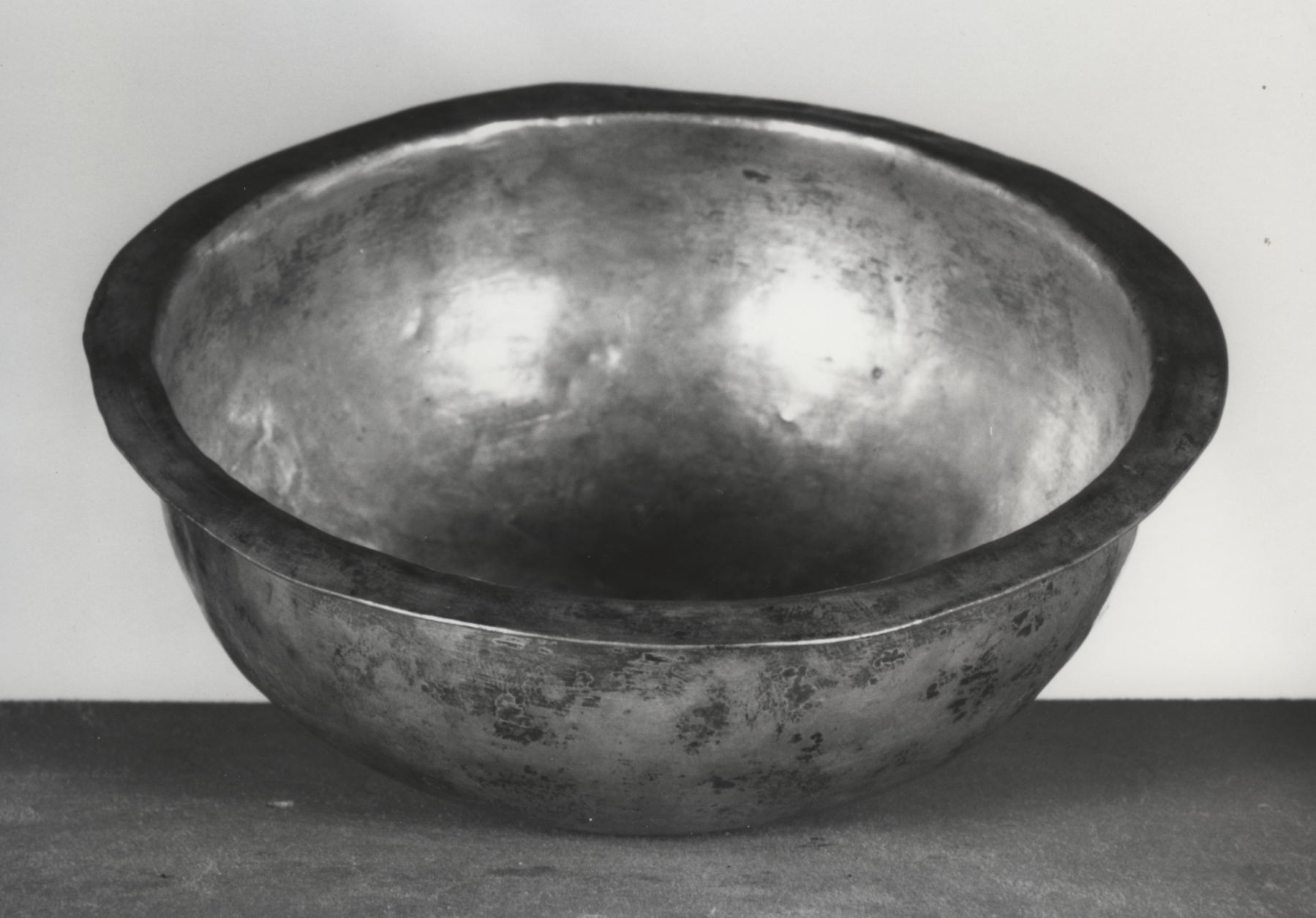
This bowl, which could have been used for hand washing or baptism. Walters Art Museum, Baltimore, Maryland.

Many of the works of Byzantine silver that survive were buried in the past for safekeeping. Examples include the Stuma Treasure of 56 objects found in Syria during 1908, dated between 540 and 640, and attributed to the village church of St Sergios at Kaper Koraon. The Sion Treasure from Lycia consists of 71 pieces with 30 pieces stamped between 550 and 565 AD See Byzantine coinage for currency and monetary information.

During the nineteenth century two silver bowls were discovered in Estonia that date to the late fifth or early sixth century period of which the Byzantine Emperor Anastasius I reigned 491-518 AD. The silver bowl deemed the “Kriimani” bowl, for the location in which it was found, has a rim of 15.5 cm with a height of 9 cm. Two beaded bands border the rim of the bowl. Silver analysis shows 93-95% Silver, 3.5-5% Copper, and traces of Gold and Platinum. The second bowl, referred to as the “Varnja Bowl,” was discovered in 1895 near the village of Varnja. The Varnja bowl also has two beaded bands that circle the rim, and it is also stamped similar to the Kriimani bowl.
