= Byzantine art =

Art of the Byzantine Empire

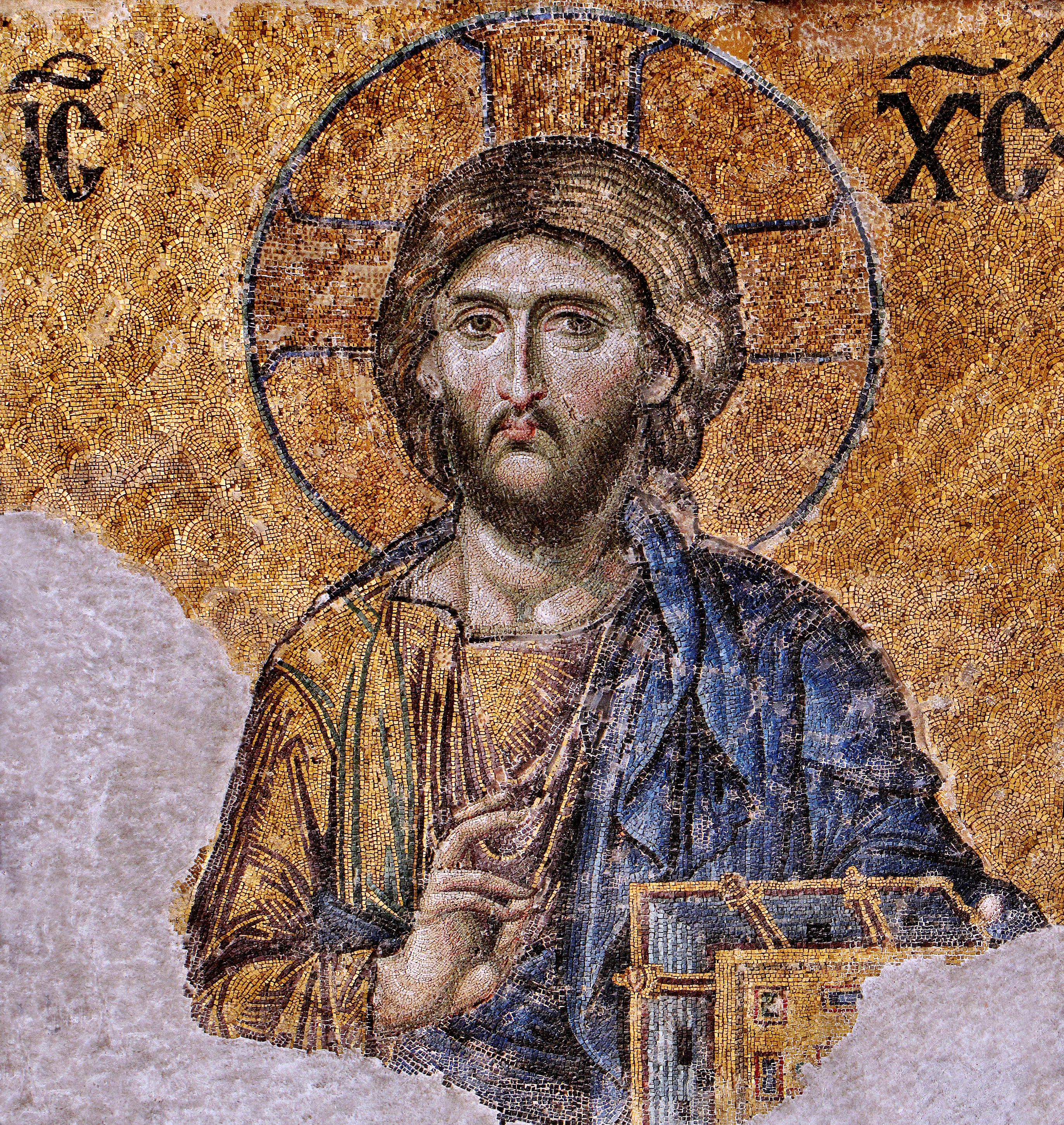
One of the most famous of the surviving Byzantine mosaics of the Hagia Sophia in Constantinople – the image of Christ Pantocrator on the walls of the upper southern gallery, Christ being flanked by the Virgin Mary and John the Baptist; c. 1261; 4.08 x 4.2 m

Byzantine art comprises the body of artistic products of the Byzantine Empire, as well as the nations and states that inherited culturally from the empire. Though the empire itself emerged from the decline of western Rome and lasted until the Conquest of Constantinople in 1453, the start date of the Byzantine period is rather clearer in art history than in political history, if still imprecise. Many Eastern Orthodox states in Eastern Europe, as well as to some degree the Islamic states of the eastern Mediterranean, preserved many aspects of the empire's culture and art for centuries afterward.

A number of contemporary states with the Byzantine Empire were culturally influenced by it without actually being part of it (the "Byzantine commonwealth"). These included Kievan Rus', as well as some non-Orthodox states like the Republic of Venice, which separated from the Byzantine Empire in the 10th century, and the Kingdom of Sicily, which had close ties to the Byzantine Empire and had also been a Byzantine territory until the 10th century with a large Greek-speaking population persisting into the 12th century. Other states having a Byzantine artistic tradition, had oscillated throughout the Middle Ages between being part of the Byzantine Empire and having periods of independence, such as Serbia and Bulgaria. After the fall of the Byzantine capital of Constantinople in 1453, art produced by Eastern Orthodox Christians living in the Ottoman Empire was often called "post-Byzantine." Certain artistic traditions that originated in the Byzantine Empire, particularly in regard to icon painting and church architecture, are maintained in Greece, Cyprus, Serbia, Bulgaria, Romania, Russia and other Eastern Orthodox countries to the present day.

== Introduction ==
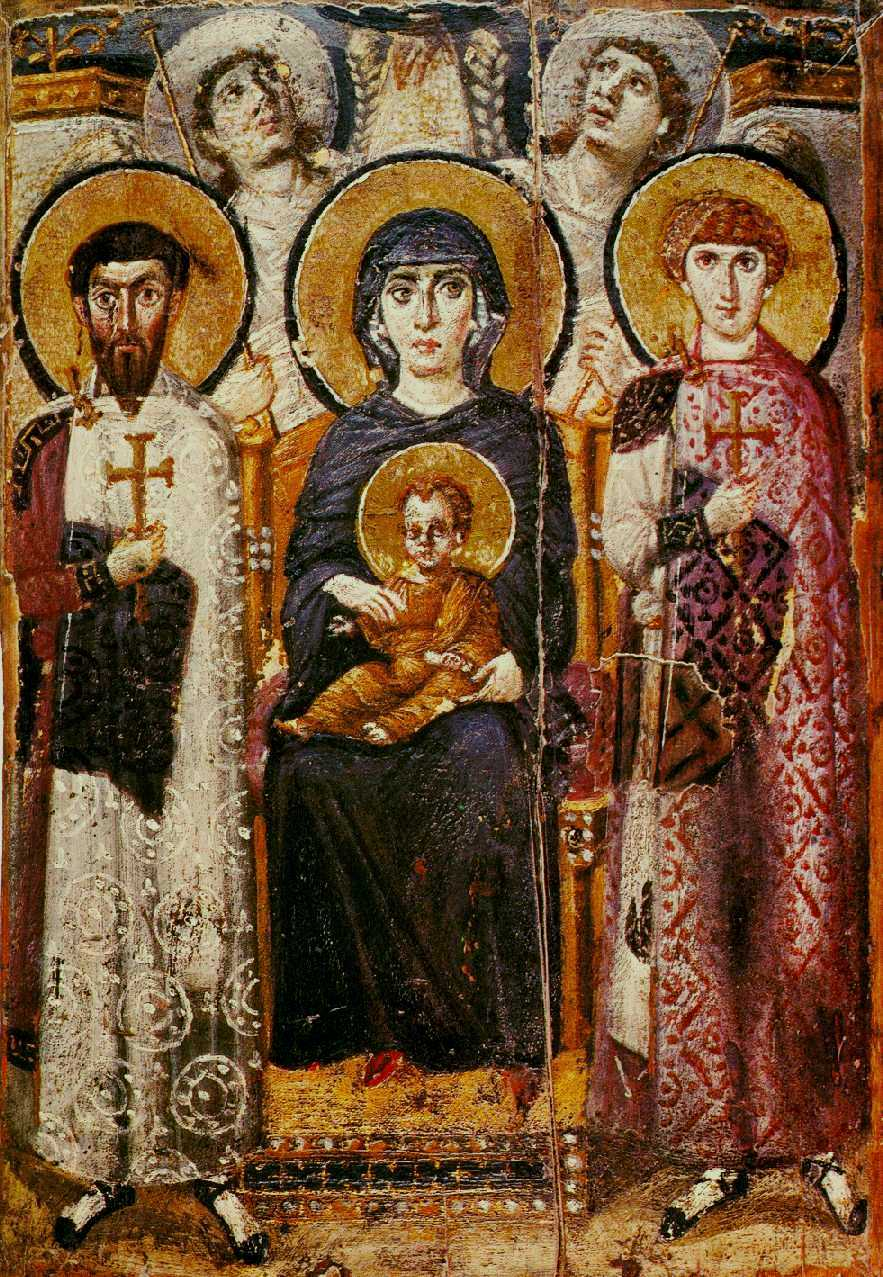
Icon of the enthroned Virgin and Child with saints and angels, 6th century, Saint Catherine's Monastery, Sinai

Byzantine art originated and evolved from the Christianized Greek culture of the Byzantine Empire; content from both Christianity and classical Greek mythology were artistically expressed through Hellenistic modes of style and iconography. The art of Byzantium never lost sight of its classical heritage; the Byzantine capital, Constantinople, was adorned with a large number of classical sculptures, although they eventually became an object of some puzzlement for its inhabitants (however, Byzantine beholders showed no signs of puzzlement towards other forms of classical media such as wall paintings). The basis of Byzantine art is a fundamental artistic attitude held by the Byzantine Greeks who, like their ancient Greek predecessors, "were never satisfied with a play of forms alone, but stimulated by an innate rationalism, endowed forms with life by associating them with a meaningful content." Although the art produced in the Byzantine Empire was marked by periodic revivals of a classical aesthetic, it was above all marked by the development of a new aesthetic defined by its salient "abstract", or anti-naturalistic character. If classical art was marked by the attempt to create representations that mimicked reality as closely as possible, Byzantine art seems to have abandoned this attempt in favor of a more symbolic approach.

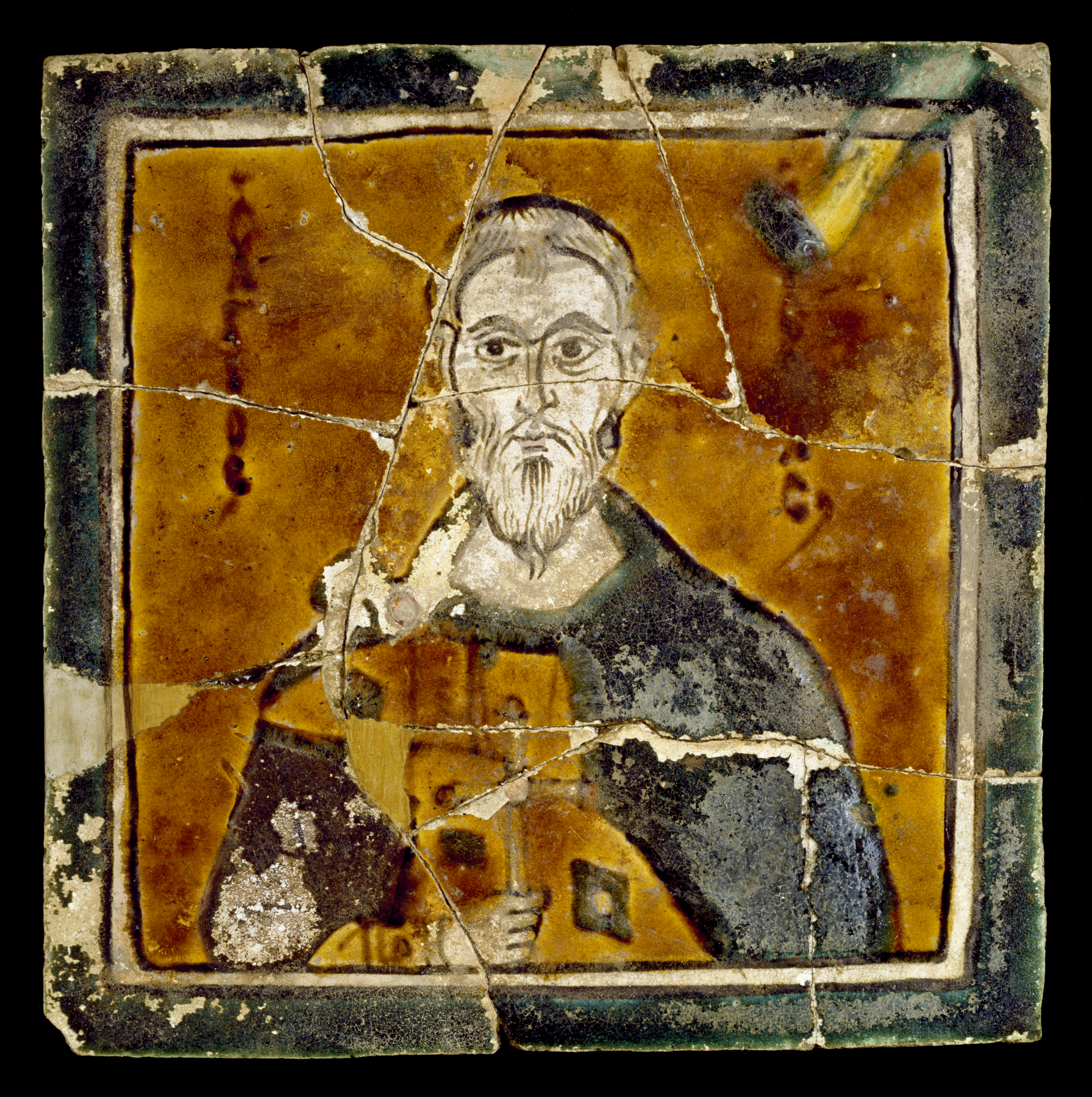
The Arab Saint Arethas depicted in traditional Byzantine style (10th century)

The nature and causes of this transformation, which largely took place during late antiquity, have been a subject of scholarly debate for centuries. Giorgio Vasari attributed it to a decline in artistic skills and standards, which had in turn been revived by his contemporaries in the Italian Renaissance. Although this point of view has been occasionally revived, most notably by Bernard Berenson, modern scholars tend to take a more positive view of the Byzantine aesthetic. Alois Riegl and Josef Strzygowski, writing in the early 20th century, were above all responsible for the revaluation of late antique art. Riegl saw it as a natural development of pre-existing tendencies in Roman art, whereas Strzygowski viewed it as a product of "oriental" influences. Notable recent contributions to the debate include those of Ernst Kitzinger, who traced a "dialectic" between "abstract" and "Hellenistic" tendencies in late antiquity, and John Onians, who saw an "increase in visual response" in late antiquity, through which a viewer "could look at something which was in twentieth-century terms purely abstract and find it representational."

In any case, the debate is purely modern: it is clear that most Byzantine viewers did not consider their art to be abstract or unnaturalistic. As Cyril Mango has observed, "our own appreciation of Byzantine art stems largely from the fact that this art is not naturalistic; yet the Byzantines themselves, judging by their extant statements, regarded it as being highly naturalistic and as being directly in the tradition of Phidias, Apelles, and Zeuxis."

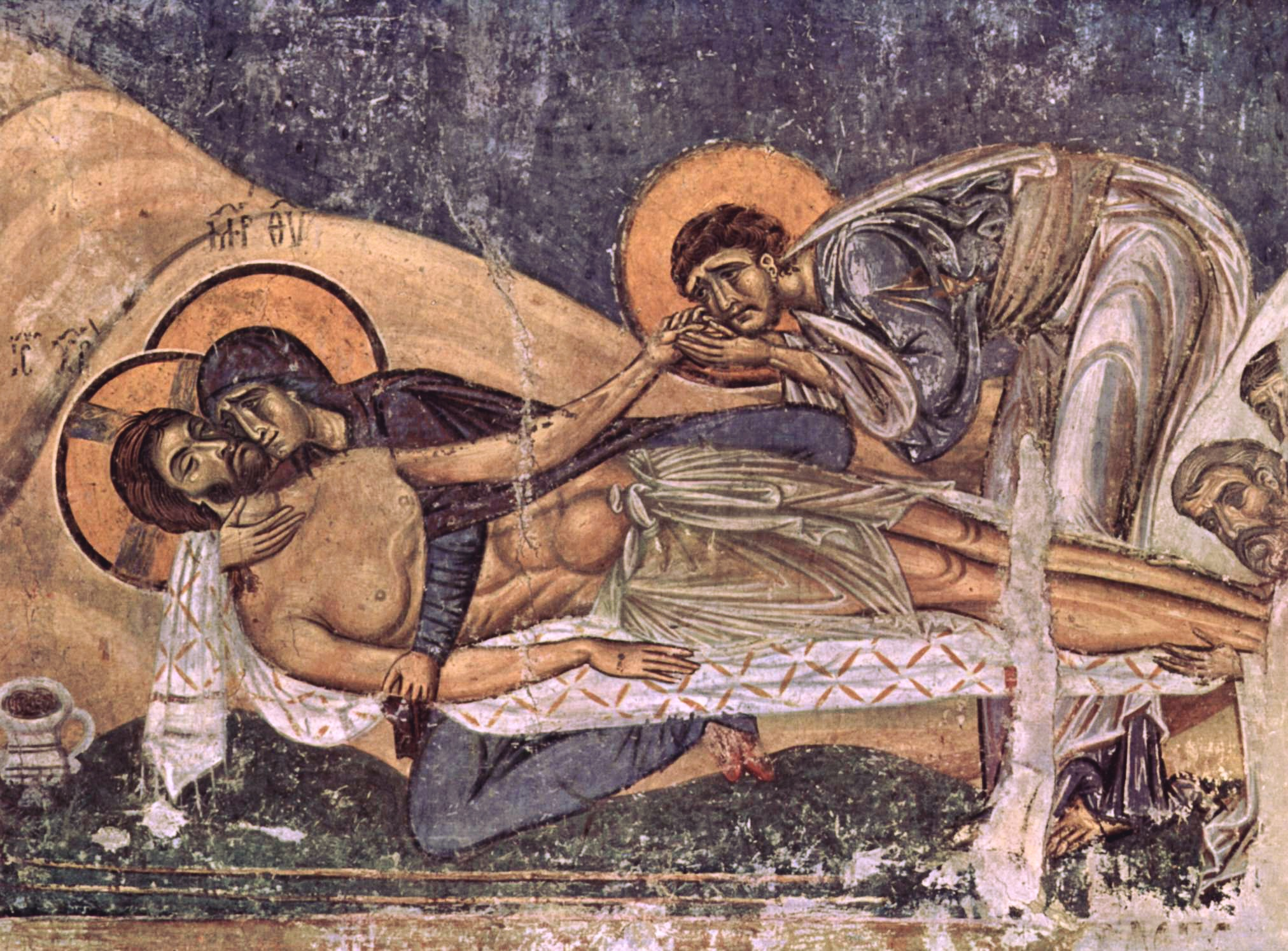
Frescoes in Nerezi near Skopje (1164), with their unique blend of high tragedy, gentle humanity, and homespun realism, anticipate the approach of Giotto and other proto-Renaissance Italian artists.

The subject matter of monumental Byzantine art was primarily religious and imperial: the two themes are often combined, as in the portraits of later Byzantine emperors that decorated the interior of the sixth-century church of Hagia Sophia in Constantinople. These preoccupations are partly a result of the pious and autocratic nature of Byzantine society, and partly a result of its economic structure: the wealth of the empire was concentrated in the hands of the church and the imperial office, which had the greatest opportunity to undertake monumental artistic commissions.

Religious art was not, however, limited to the monumental decoration of church interiors. One of the most important genres of Byzantine art was the icon, an image of Christ, the Virgin, or a saint, used as an object of veneration in Orthodox churches and private homes alike. Icons were more religious than aesthetic in nature: especially after the end of iconoclasm, they were understood to manifest the unique "presence" of the figure depicted by means of a "likeness" to that figure maintained through carefully maintained canons of representation.

Byzantine illuminated manuscripts were another major genre of Byzantine art. The most commonly illustrated texts were religious, both scripture itself (particularly the Psalms) and devotional or theological texts (such as the Ladder of Divine Ascent of John Climacus or the homilies of Gregory of Nazianzus). Secular texts were also illuminated: important examples include the Alexander Romance and the history of John Skylitzes.

The Byzantines inherited the Early Christian distrust of monumental sculpture in religious art, and produced only reliefs, of which very few survivals are anything like life-size, in sharp contrast to the medieval art of the West, where monumental sculpture revived from Carolingian art onwards. Small ivories were also mostly in relief.

The so-called "minor arts" were very important in Byzantine art and luxury items, including ivories carved in relief as formal presentation Consular diptychs or caskets such as the Veroli casket, hardstone carvings, enamels, glass, jewelry, metalwork, and figured silks were produced in large quantities throughout the Byzantine era, many continuing and adapting late Roman artistic practice though Byzantine silk production only began after they imported silkworms from China in the late sixth century. Many of these were religious in nature, although a large number of objects with secular or non-representational decoration were produced: for example, ivories representing themes from classical mythology. Byzantine ceramics were relatively crude, as pottery was never used at the tables of the rich, who ate off Byzantine silver.

== Periods ==
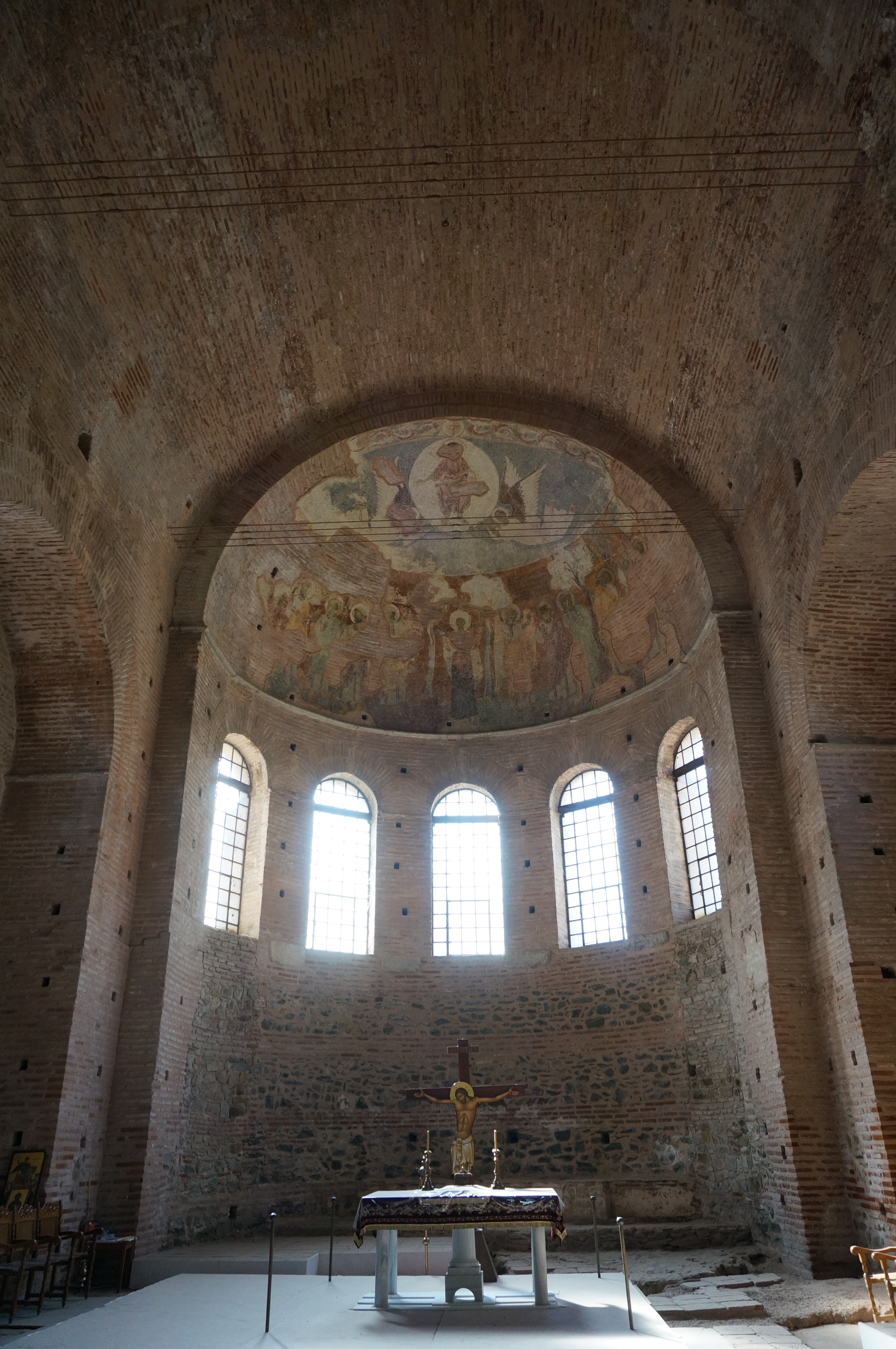
Interior of the Rotunda of St. George, Thessaloniki, with remnants of the mosaics

Byzantine art and architecture is divided into four periods by convention: the Early period, commencing with the Edict of Milan (when Christian worship was legitimized) and the transfer of the imperial seat to Constantinople, extends to AD 842, with the conclusion of Iconoclasm; the Middle, or high period, begins with the restoration of the icons in 843 and culminates in the Fall of Constantinople to the Crusaders in 1204; the Late period includes the eclectic osmosis between Western European and traditional Byzantine elements in art and architecture, and ends with the Fall of Constantinople to the Ottoman Turks in 1453. The term post-Byzantine is then used for later years, whereas "Neo-Byzantine" is used for art and architecture from the 19th century onwards, when the dissolution of the Ottoman Empire prompted a renewed appreciation of Byzantium by artists and historians alike.

=== Early Byzantine art ===
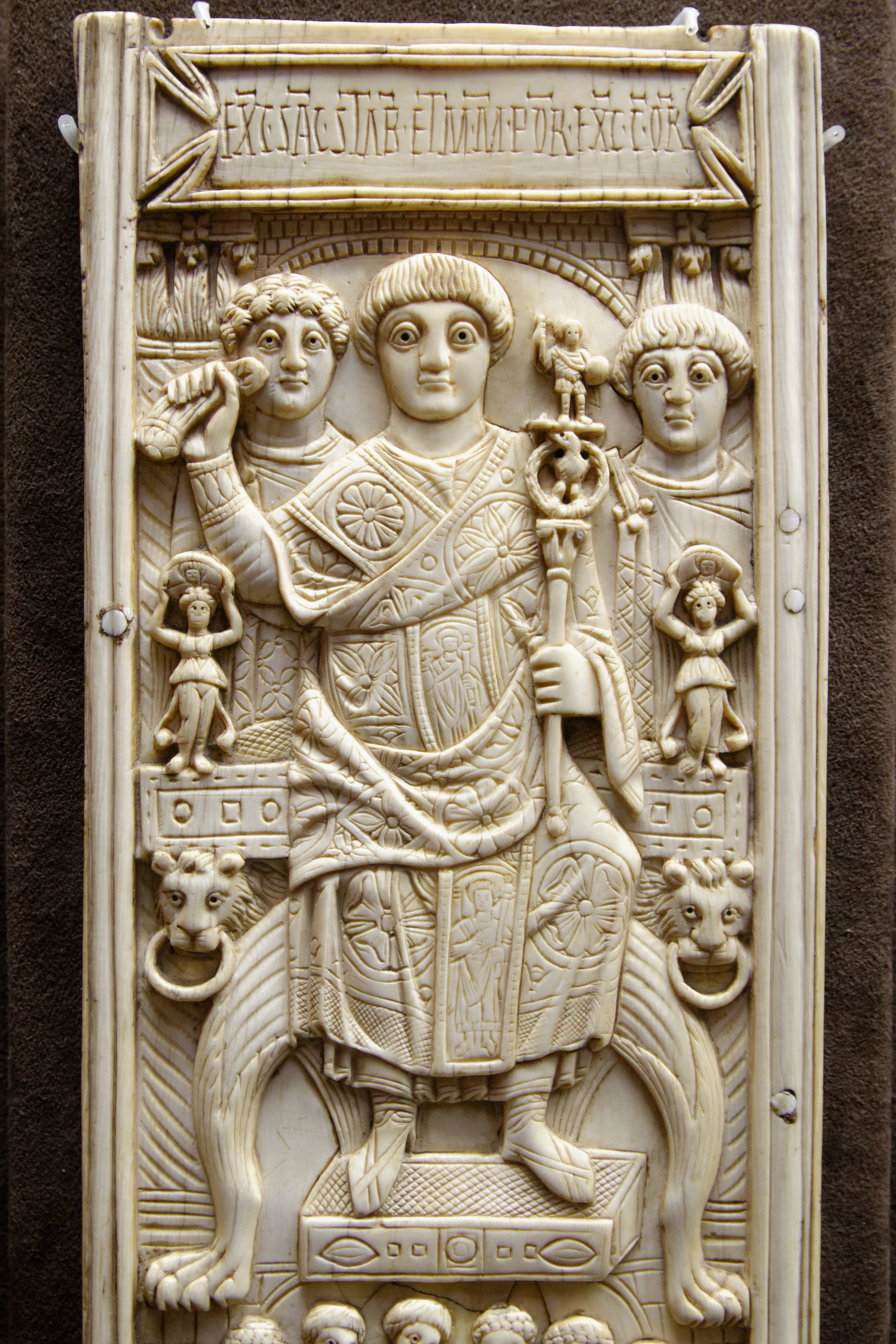
Leaf from an ivory diptych of Areobindus Dagalaiphus Areobindus, consul in Constantinople, 506. Areobindus is shown above, presiding over the games in the Hippodrome, depicted beneath (Musée national du Moyen Âge)

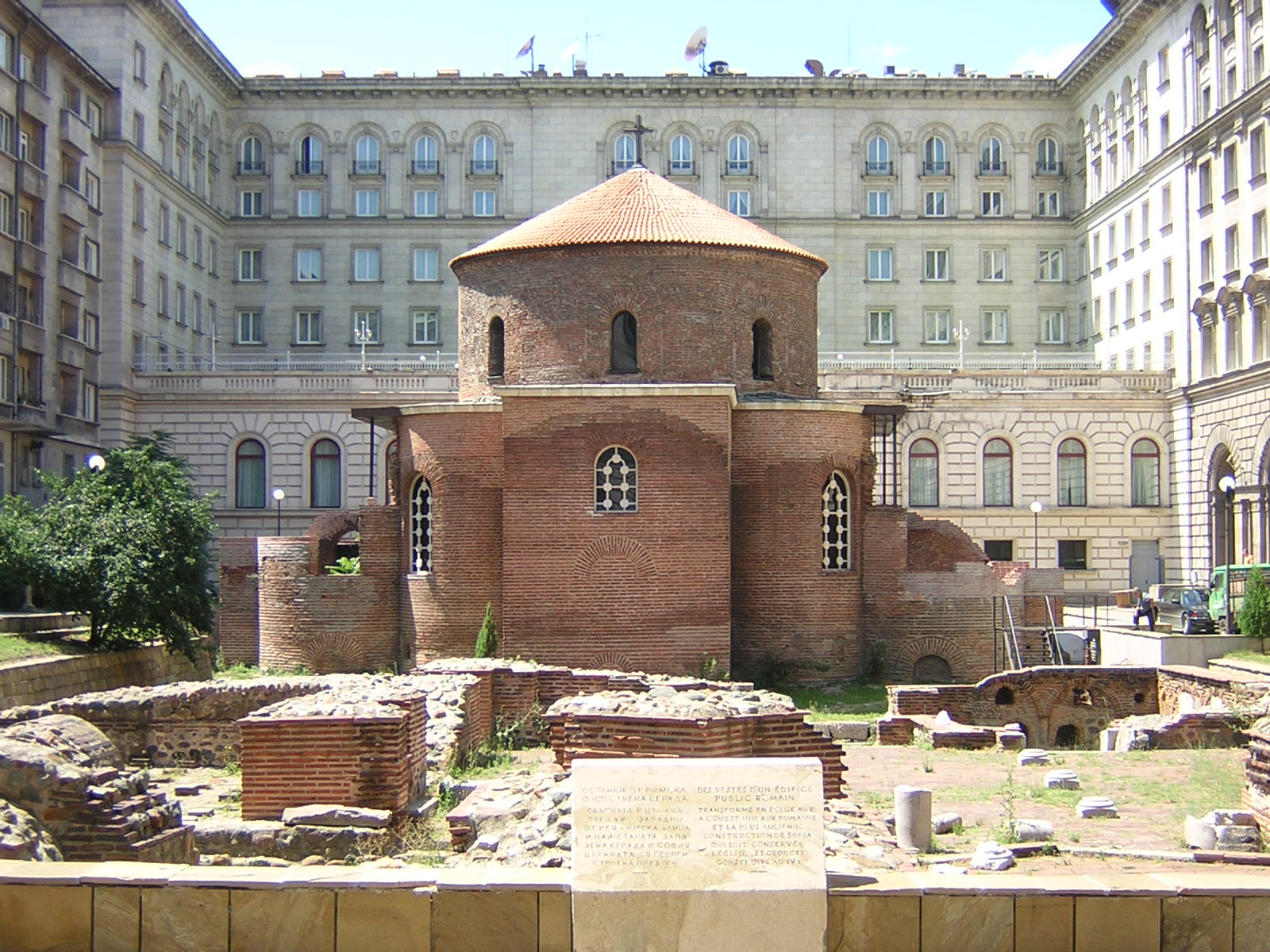
The St. George Rotunda in Sofia, built in the 4th century, and some remains of Serdica can be seen in the foreground

Two events were of fundamental importance to the development of a unique, Byzantine art. First, the Edict of Milan, issued by the emperors Constantine I and Licinius in 313, allowed for public Christian worship, and led to the development of a monumental, Christian art. Second, the dedication of Constantinople in 330 created a great new artistic centre for the eastern half of the Empire, and a specifically Christian one. Other artistic traditions flourished in rival cities such as Alexandria, Antioch, and Rome, but it was not until all of these cities had fallen - the first two to the Arabs and Rome to the Goths - that Constantinople established its supremacy.

Constantine devoted great effort to the decoration of Constantinople, adorning its public spaces with ancient statuary, and building a forum dominated by a porphyry column that carried a statue of himself. Major Constantinopolitan churches built under Constantine and his son, Constantius II, included the original foundations of Hagia Sophia and the Church of the Holy Apostles.

The next major building campaign in Constantinople was sponsored by Theodosius I. The most important surviving monument of this period is the obelisk and base erected by Theodosius in the Hippodrome which, with the large silver dish called the Missorium of Theodosius I, represents the classic examples of what is sometimes called the "Theodosian Renaissance". The earliest surviving church in Constantinople is the Basilica of St. John at the Stoudios Monastery, built in the fifth century.

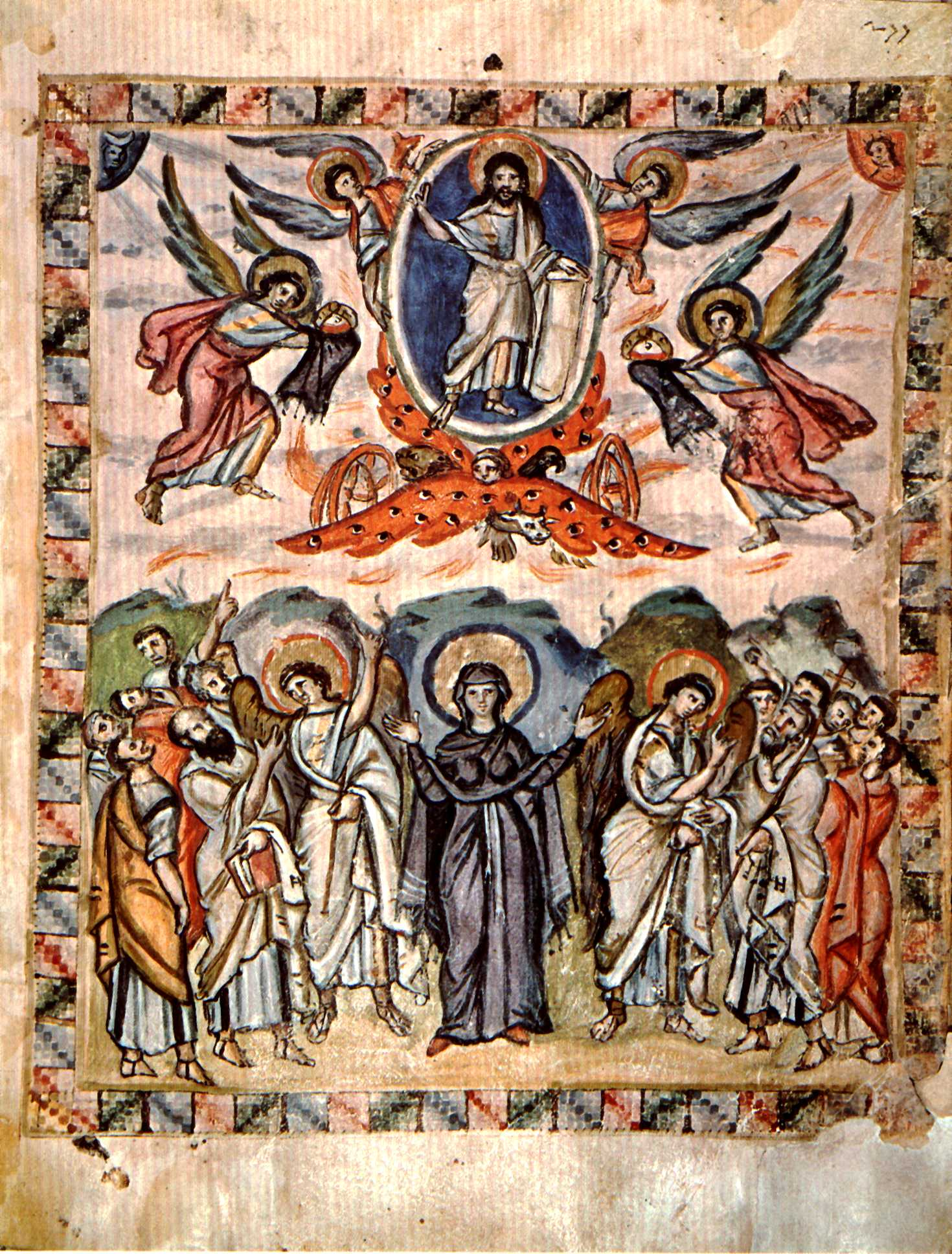
Miniatures of the 6th-century Rabula Gospel (a Byzantine Syriac Gospel) display the more abstract and symbolic nature of Byzantine art

Due to subsequent rebuilding and destruction, relatively few Constantinopolitan monuments of this early period survive. However, the development of monumental early Byzantine art can still be traced through surviving structures in other cities. For example, important early churches are found in Rome (including Santa Sabina and Santa Maria Maggiore), and in Thessaloniki (the Rotunda and the Acheiropoietos Basilica).

A number of important illuminated manuscripts, both sacred and secular, survive from this early period. Classical authors, including Virgil (represented by the Vergilius Vaticanus and the Vergilius Romanus) and Homer (represented by the Ambrosian Iliad), were illustrated with narrative paintings. Illuminated biblical manuscripts of this period survive only in fragments: for example, the Quedlinburg Itala fragment is a small portion of what must have been a lavishly illustrated copy of 1 Kings.

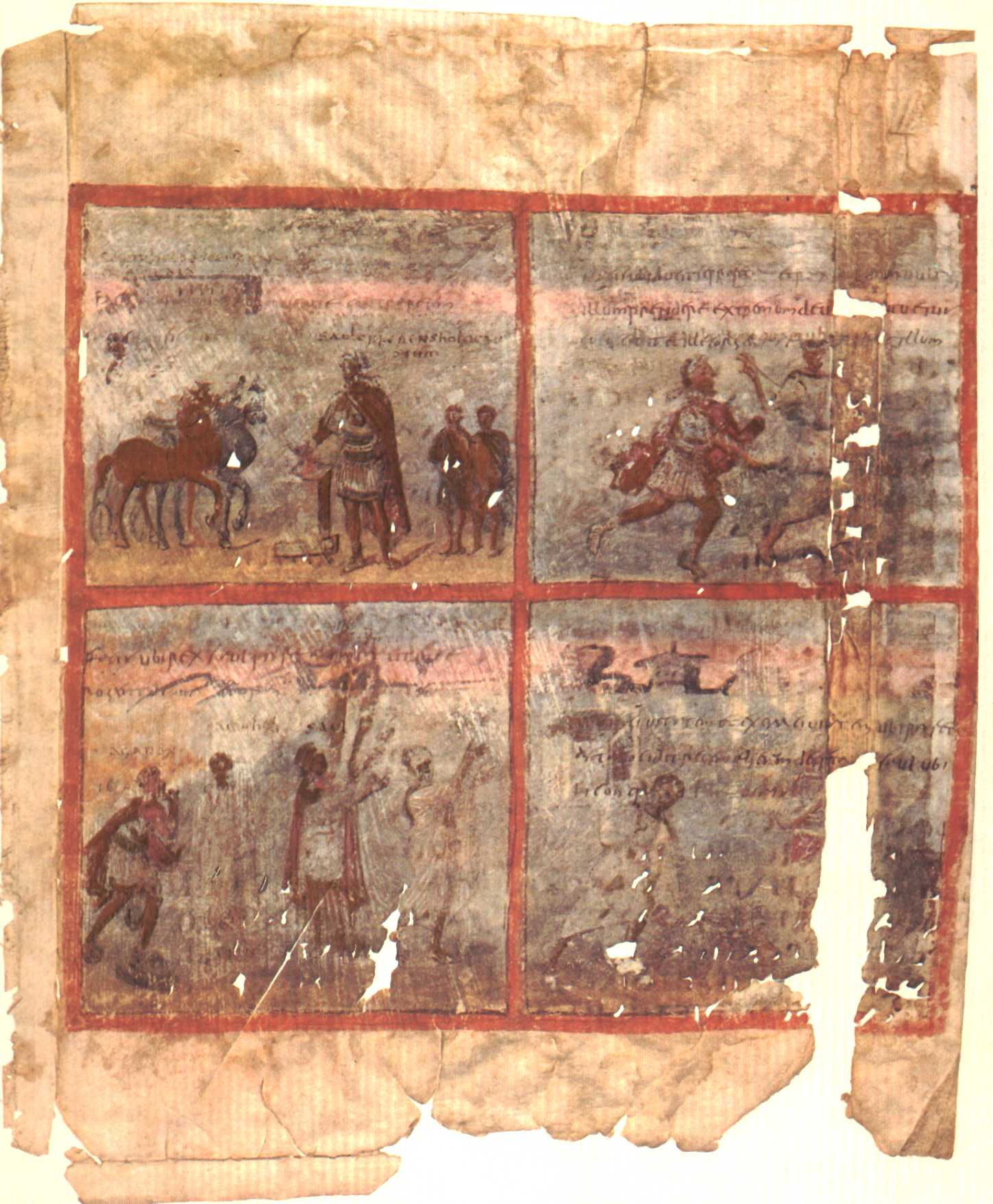
Scenes from Chapter 15 of 1 Samuel from the 5th century CE Quedlinburg Itala fragment.

Early Byzantine art was also marked by the cultivation of ivory carving. Ivory diptychs, often elaborately decorated, were issued as gifts by newly appointed consuls. Silver plates were another important form of luxury art: among the most lavish from this period is the Missorium of Theodosius I. Sarcophagi continued to be produced in great numbers.

=== Age of Justinian ===
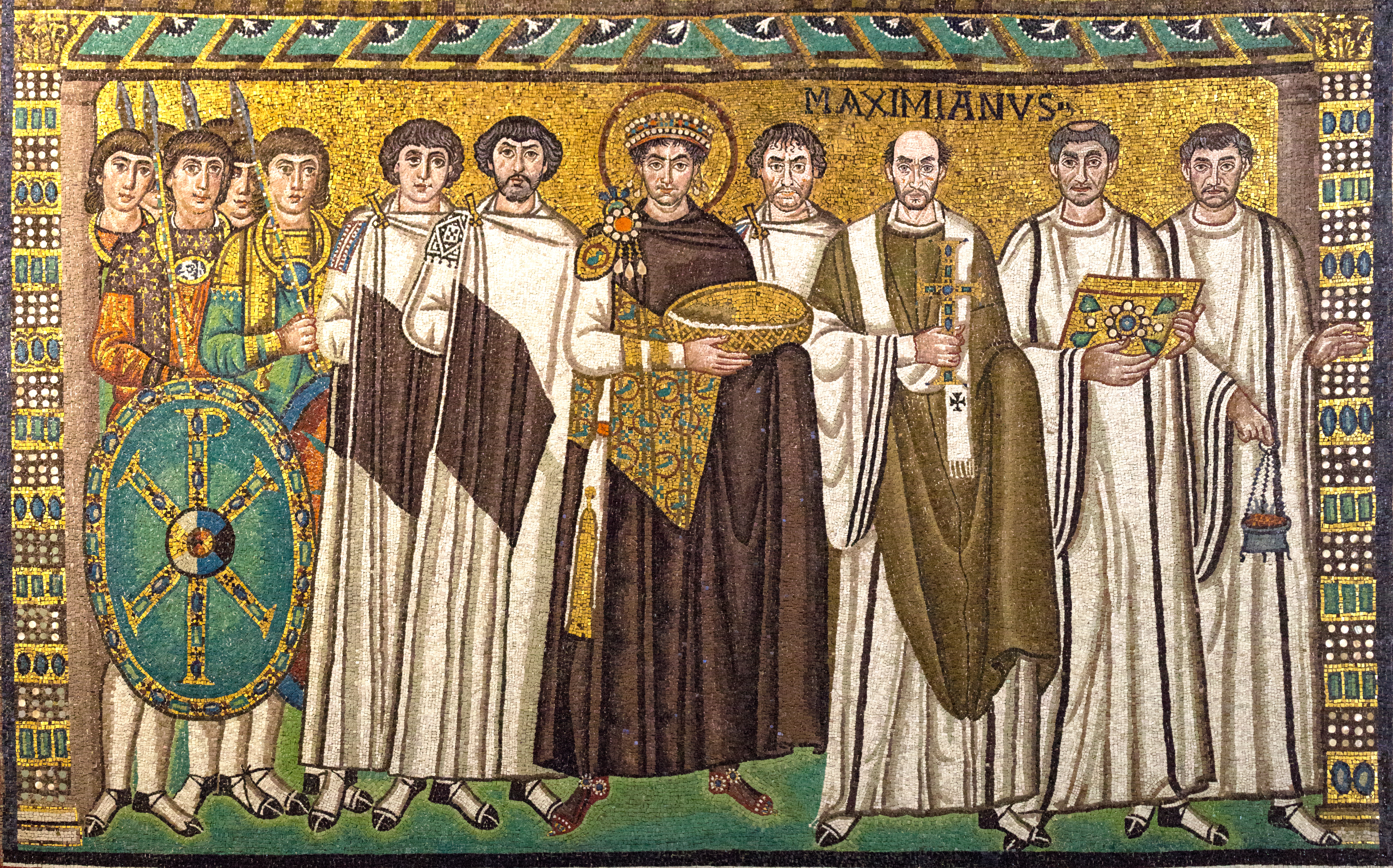
Mosaic from San Vitale in Ravenna, showing the Emperor Justinian and Bishop Maximianus, surrounded by clerics and soldiers.

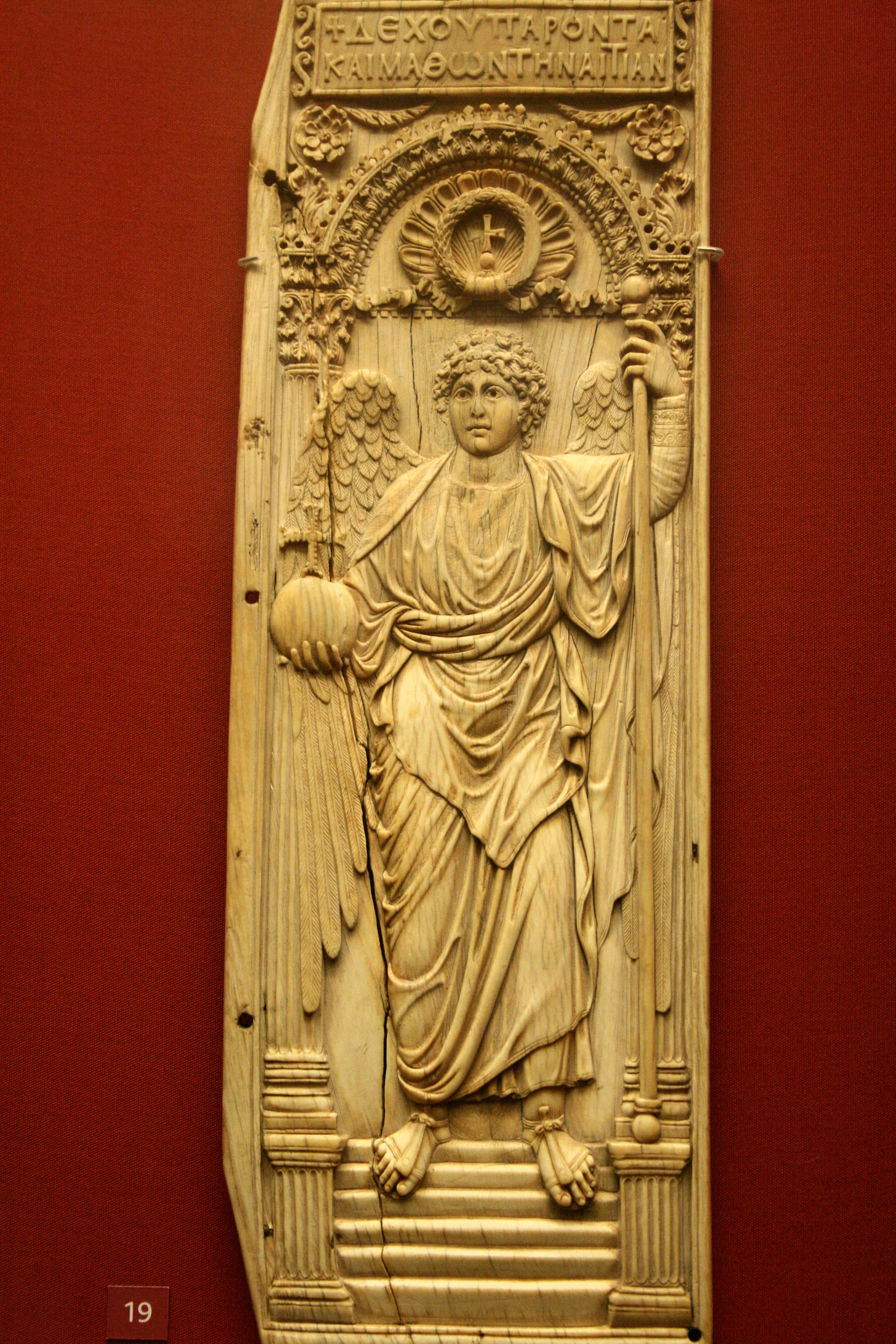
Archangel ivory of the early 6th century from Constantinople

Significant changes in Byzantine art coincided with the reign of Justinian I (527–565). Justinian devoted much of his reign to reconquering Italy, North Africa and Spain. He also laid the foundations of the imperial absolutism of the Byzantine state, codifying its laws and imposing his religious views on all his subjects by law.

A significant component of Justinian's project of imperial renovation was a massive building program, which was described in a book, the Buildings, written by Justinian's court historian, Procopius. Justinian renovated, rebuilt, or founded anew countless churches within Constantinople, including Hagia Sophia, which had been destroyed during the Nika riots, the Church of the Holy Apostles, and the Church of Saints Sergius and Bacchus. Justinian also built a number of churches and fortifications outside of the imperial capital, including Saint Catherine's Monastery on Mount Sinai in Egypt, Basilica of Saint Sofia in Sofia and the Basilica of St. John in Ephesus.

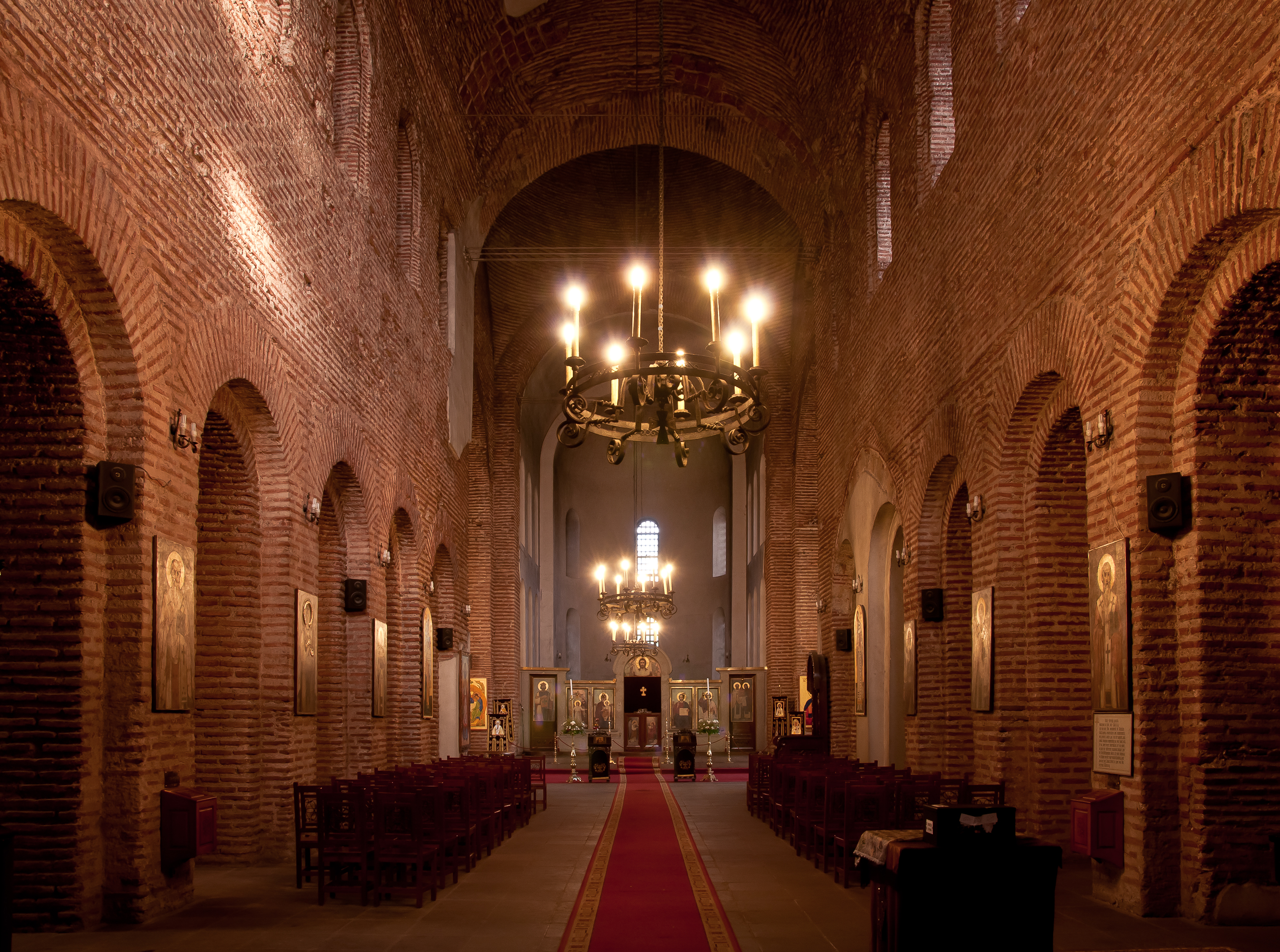
Nave of Basilica of Saint Sofia

Several major churches of this period were built in the provinces by local bishops in imitation of the new Constantinopolitan foundations. The Basilica of San Vitale in Ravenna, was built by Bishop Maximianus. The decoration of San Vitale includes important mosaics of Justinian and his empress, Theodora, although neither ever visited the church. Also of note is the Euphrasian Basilica in Poreč.

Recent archeological discoveries in the 19th and 20th centuries unearthed a large group of Early Byzantine mosaics in the Middle East. The eastern provinces of the Byzantine Empire inherited a strong artistic tradition from Late Antiquity. Christian mosaic art flourished in this area from the 4th century onwards. The tradition of making mosaics was carried on in the Umayyad era until the end of the 8th century. The most important surviving examples are the Madaba Map, the mosaics of Mount Nebo, Saint Catherine's Monastery and the Church of St Stephen in ancient Kastron Mefaa (now Umm ar-Rasas).

The first fully preserved illuminated biblical manuscripts date to the first half of the sixth century, most notably the Vienna Genesis, the Rossano Gospels, and the Sinope Gospels. The Vienna Dioscurides is a lavishly illustrated botanical treatise, presented as a gift to the Byzantine aristocrat Julia Anicia.

Important ivory sculptures of this period include the Barberini ivory, which probably depicts Justinian himself, and the Archangel ivory in the British Museum. Byzantine silver plate continued to be decorated with scenes drawn from classical mythology; for example, a plate in the Cabinet des Médailles, Paris, depicts Hercules wrestling the Nemean lion.

=== Seventh-century crisis ===
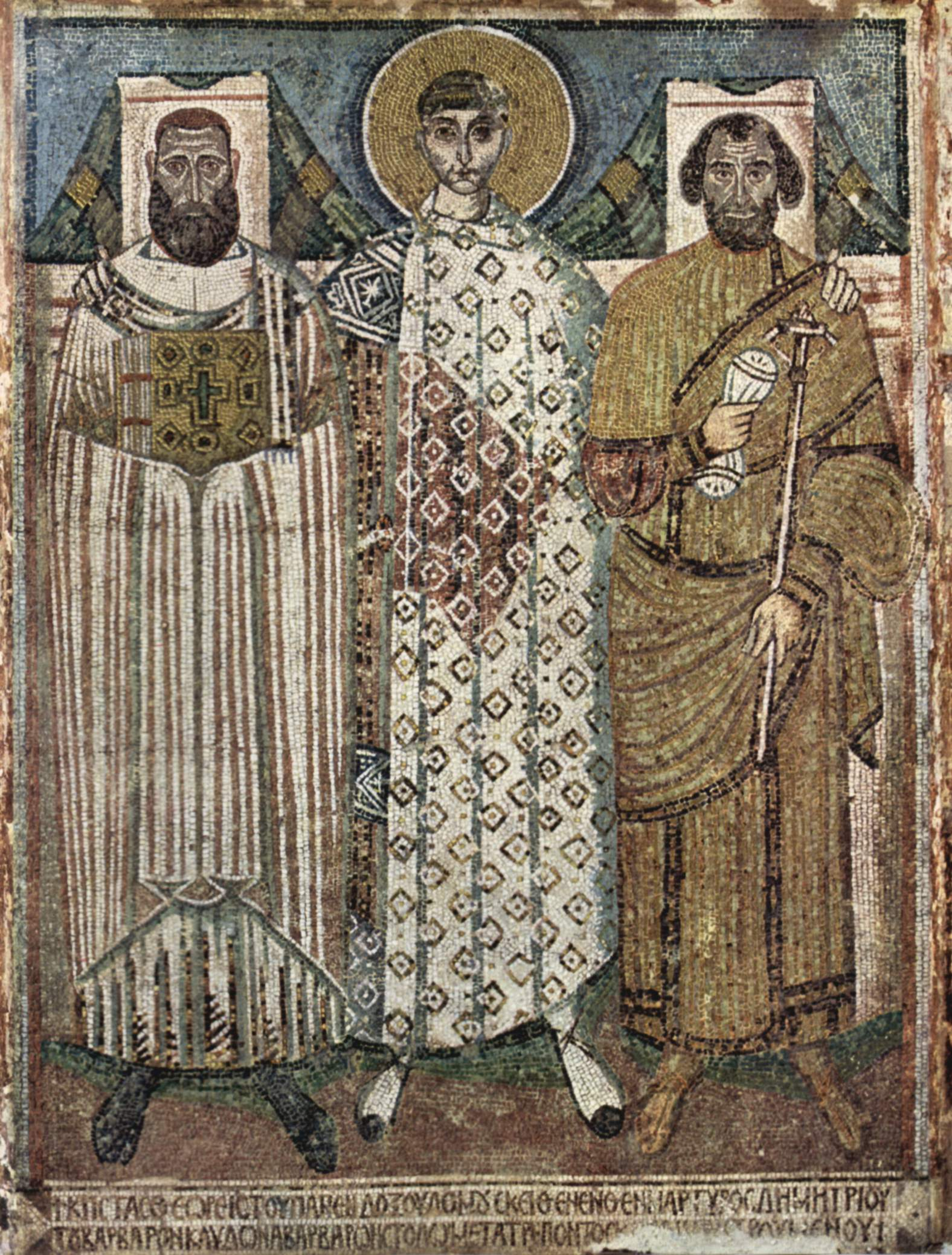
Mosaic from the church of Hagios Demetrios in Thessaloniki, late 7th or early 8th century, showing St. Demetrios with the bishop and the eparch

The Age of Justinian was followed by a political decline, since most of Justinian's conquests were lost and the Empire faced acute crisis with the invasions of the Avars, Slavs, Persians and Arabs in the 7th century. Constantinople was also wracked by religious and political conflict.

The most significant surviving monumental projects of this period were undertaken outside of the imperial capital. The church of Hagios Demetrios in Thessaloniki was rebuilt after a fire in the mid-seventh century. The new sections include mosaics executed in a remarkably abstract style. The church of the Koimesis in Nicaea (present-day Iznik), destroyed in the early 20th century but documented through photographs, demonstrates the simultaneous survival of a more classical style of church decoration. The churches of Rome, still a Byzantine territory in this period, also include important surviving decorative programs, especially Santa Maria Antiqua, Sant'Agnese fuori le mura, and the Chapel of San Venanzio in San Giovanni in Laterano. Byzantine mosaicists probably also contributed to the decoration of the early Umayyad monuments, including the Dome of the Rock in Jerusalem and the Great Mosque of Damascus.

Important works of luxury art from this period include the silver David Plates, produced during the reign of Emperor Heraclius, and depicting scenes from the life of the Hebrew king David. The most notable surviving manuscripts are Syriac gospel books, such as the so-called Syriac Bible of Paris. However, the London Canon Tables bear witness to the continuing production of lavish gospel books in Greek.

The period between Justinian and iconoclasm saw major changes in the social and religious roles of images within Byzantium. The veneration of acheiropoieta, or holy images "not made by human hands," became a significant phenomenon, and in some instances these images were credited with saving cities from military assault. By the end of the seventh century, certain images of saints had come to be viewed as "windows" through which one could communicate with the figure depicted. Proskynesis before images is also attested in texts from the late seventh century. These developments mark the beginnings of a theology of icons.

At the same time, the debate over the proper role of art in the decoration of churches intensified. Three canons of the Quinisext Council of 692 addressed controversies in this area: prohibition of the representation of the cross on church pavements (Canon 73), prohibition of the representation of Christ as a lamb (Canon 82), and a general injunction against "pictures, whether they are in paintings or in what way so ever, which attract the eye and corrupt the mind, and incite it to the enkindling of base pleasures" (Canon 100).

=== Crisis of iconoclasm ===
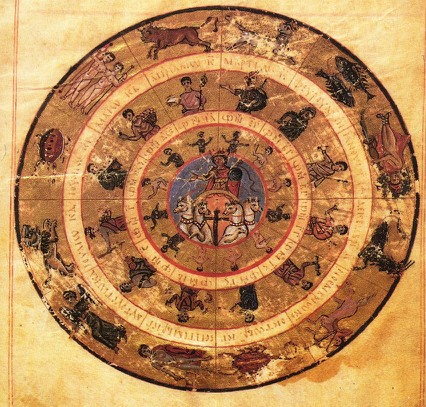
Helios in his chariot, surrounded by symbols of the months and of the zodiac. From Vat. Gr. 1291, the "Handy Tables" of Ptolemy, produced during the reign of Constantine V

Intense debate over the role of art in worship led eventually to the period of "Byzantine iconoclasm." Sporadic outbreaks of iconoclasm on the part of local bishops are attested in Asia Minor during the 720s. In 726, an underwater earthquake between the islands of Thera and Therasia was interpreted by Emperor Leo III as a sign of God's anger, and may have led Leo to remove a famous icon of Christ from the Chalke Gate outside the imperial palace. However, iconoclasm probably did not become imperial policy until the reign of Leo's son, Constantine V. The Council of Hieria, convened under Constantine in 754, proscribed the manufacture of icons of Christ. This inaugurated the Iconoclastic period, which lasted, with interruptions, until 843.

While iconoclasm severely restricted the role of religious art, and led to the removal of some earlier apse mosaics and (possibly) the sporadic destruction of portable icons, it never constituted a total ban on the production of figural art. Ample literary sources indicate that secular art (i.e. hunting scenes and depictions of the games in the hippodrome) continued to be produced, and the few monuments that can be securely dated to the period (most notably the manuscript of Ptolemy's "Handy Tables" today held by the Vatican) demonstrate that metropolitan artists maintained a high quality of production.

Major churches dating to this period include Hagia Eirene in Constantinople, which was rebuilt in the 760s following its destruction by the 740 earthquake. The interior of Hagia Eirene, which is dominated by a large mosaic cross in the apse, is one of the best-preserved examples of iconoclastic church decoration. The church of Hagia Sophia in Thessaloniki was also rebuilt in the late 8th century.

Certain churches built outside of the empire during this period, but decorated in a figural, "Byzantine," style, may also bear witness to the continuing activities of Byzantine artists. Particularly important in this regard are the original mosaics of the Palatine Chapel in Aachen (since either destroyed or heavily restored) and the frescoes in the Church of Maria foris portas in Castelseprio.

=== Macedonian art ===
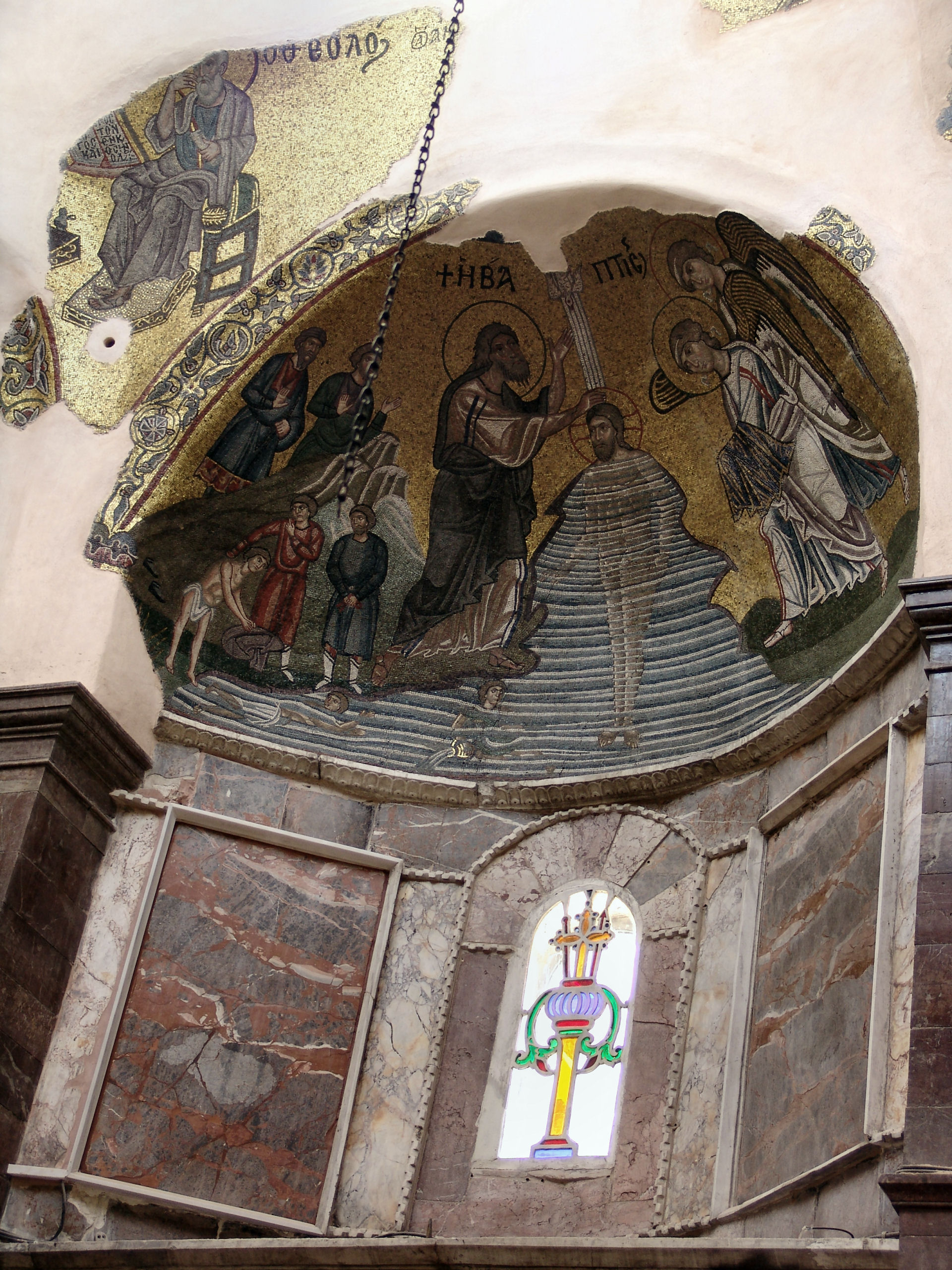
Mosaics of Nea Moni of Chios (11th century)

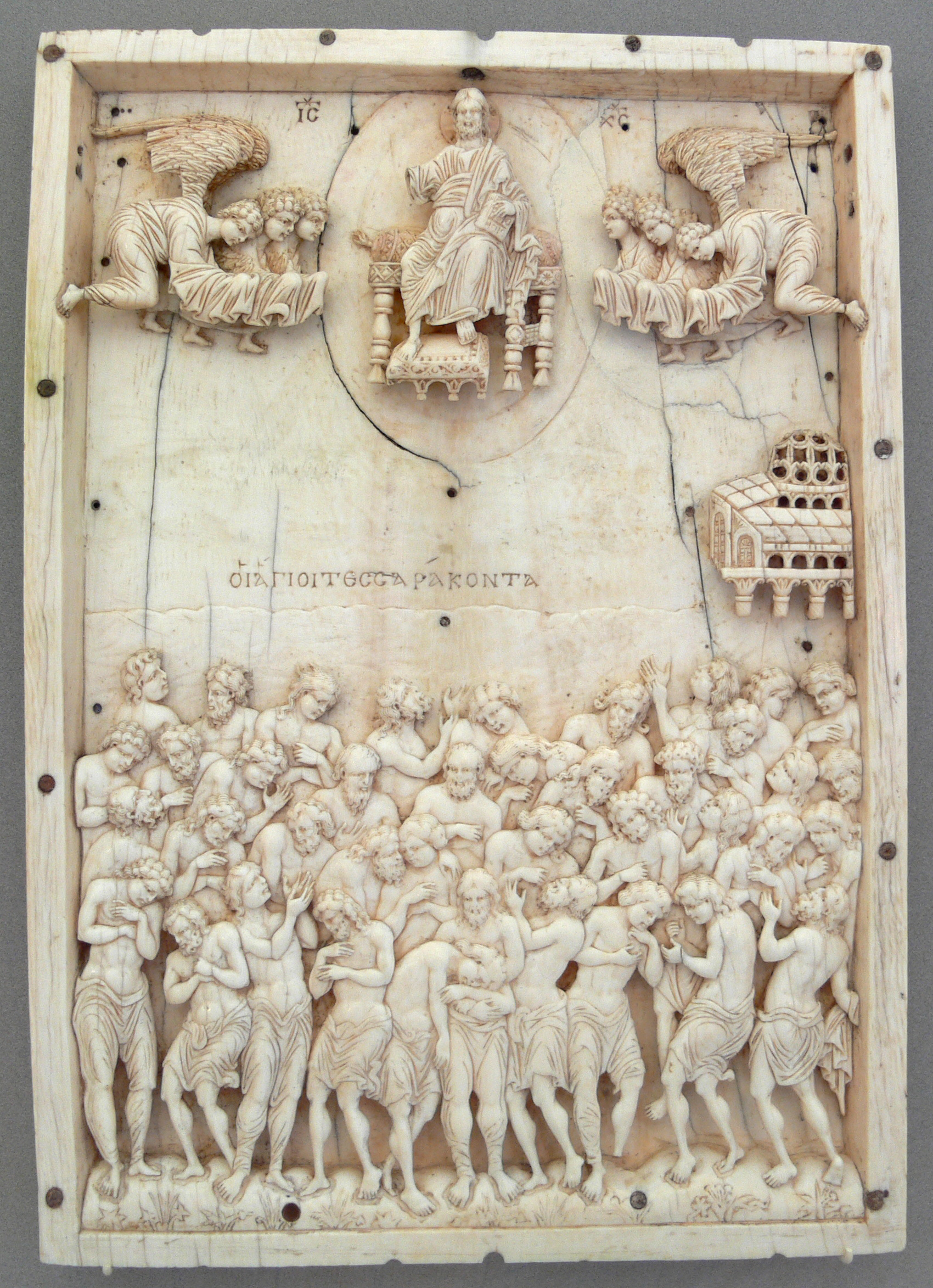
An example of Macedonian-era ivorywork from Constantinople: the Forty Martyrs of Sebaste, now in the Bode Museum, Berlin

The rulings of the Council of Hieria were reversed by a new church council in 843, celebrated to this day in the Eastern Orthodox Church as the "Triumph of Orthodoxy." In 867, the installation of a new apse mosaic in Hagia Sophia depicting the Virgin and Child was celebrated by the Patriarch Photios in a famous homily as a victory over the evils of iconoclasm. Later in the same year, the Emperor Basil I, called "the Macedonian," acceded to the throne; as a result the following period of Byzantine art has sometimes been called the "Macedonian Renaissance", although the term is doubly problematic (it was neither "Macedonian", nor, strictly speaking, a "Renaissance").

In the 9th and 10th centuries, the Empire's military situation improved, and patronage of art and architecture increased. New churches were commissioned, and the standard architectural form (the "cross-in-square") and decorative scheme of the Middle Byzantine church were standardised. Major surviving examples include Hosios Loukas in Boeotia, the Daphni Monastery near Athens and Nea Moni on Chios.

There was a revival of interest in the depiction of subjects from classical Greek mythology (as on the Veroli Casket) and in the use of a "classical" Hellenistic styles to depict religious, and particularly Old Testament, subjects (of which the Paris Psalter and the Joshua Roll are important examples).

The Macedonian period also saw a revival of the late antique technique of ivory carving. Many ornate ivory triptychs and diptychs survive, such as the Harbaville Triptych and a triptych at Luton Hoo, dating from the reign of Nicephorus Phocas.

=== Komnenian age ===
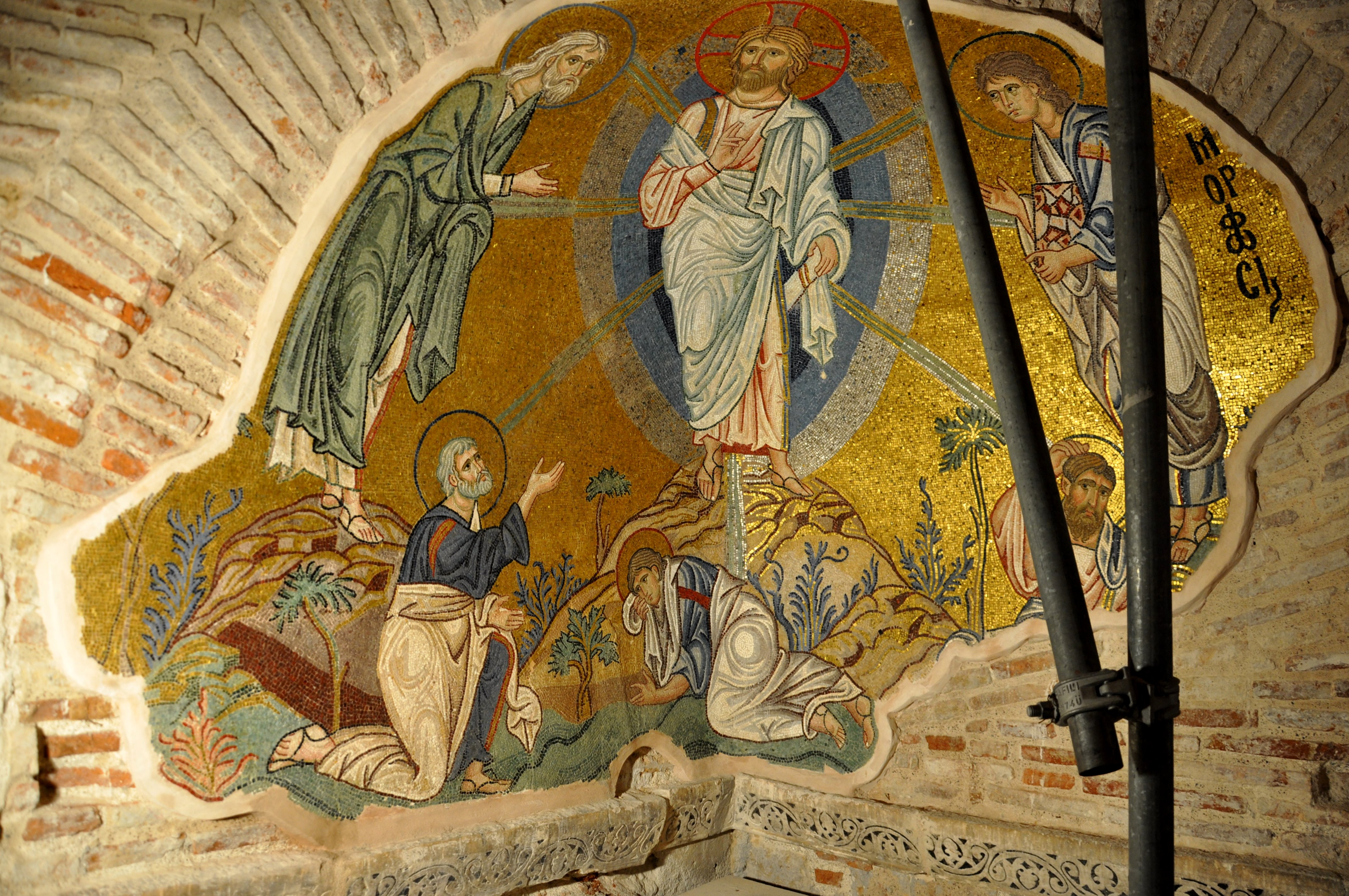
Mosaic of Daphni Monastery (ca. 1100)

The Macedonian emperors were followed by the Komnenian dynasty, beginning with the reign of Alexios I Komnenos in 1081. Byzantium had recently suffered a period of severe dislocation following the Battle of Manzikert in 1071 and the subsequent loss of Asia Minor to the Turks. However, the Komnenoi brought stability to the empire (1081–1185) and during the course of the twelfth century their energetic campaigning did much to restore the fortunes of the empire. The Komnenoi were great patrons of the arts, and with their support Byzantine artists continued to move in the direction of greater humanism and emotion, of which the Theotokos of Vladimir, the cycle of mosaics at Daphni, and the murals at Nerezi yield important examples. Ivory sculpture and other expensive mediums of art gradually gave way to frescoes and icons, which for the first time gained widespread popularity across the Empire. Apart from painted icons, there were other varieties - notably the mosaic and ceramic ones.

Some of the finest Byzantine work of this period may be found outside the Empire: in the mosaics of Gelati, Kiev, Torcello, Venice, Monreale, Cefalù and Palermo. For instance, Venice's Basilica of St Mark, begun in 1063, was based on the great Church of the Holy Apostles in Constantinople, now destroyed, and is thus an echo of the age of Justinian. The acquisitive habits of the Venetians mean that the basilica is also a great museum of Byzantine artworks of all kinds (e.g., Pala d'Oro).

=== Ivory caskets of the Macedonian era (gallery) ===
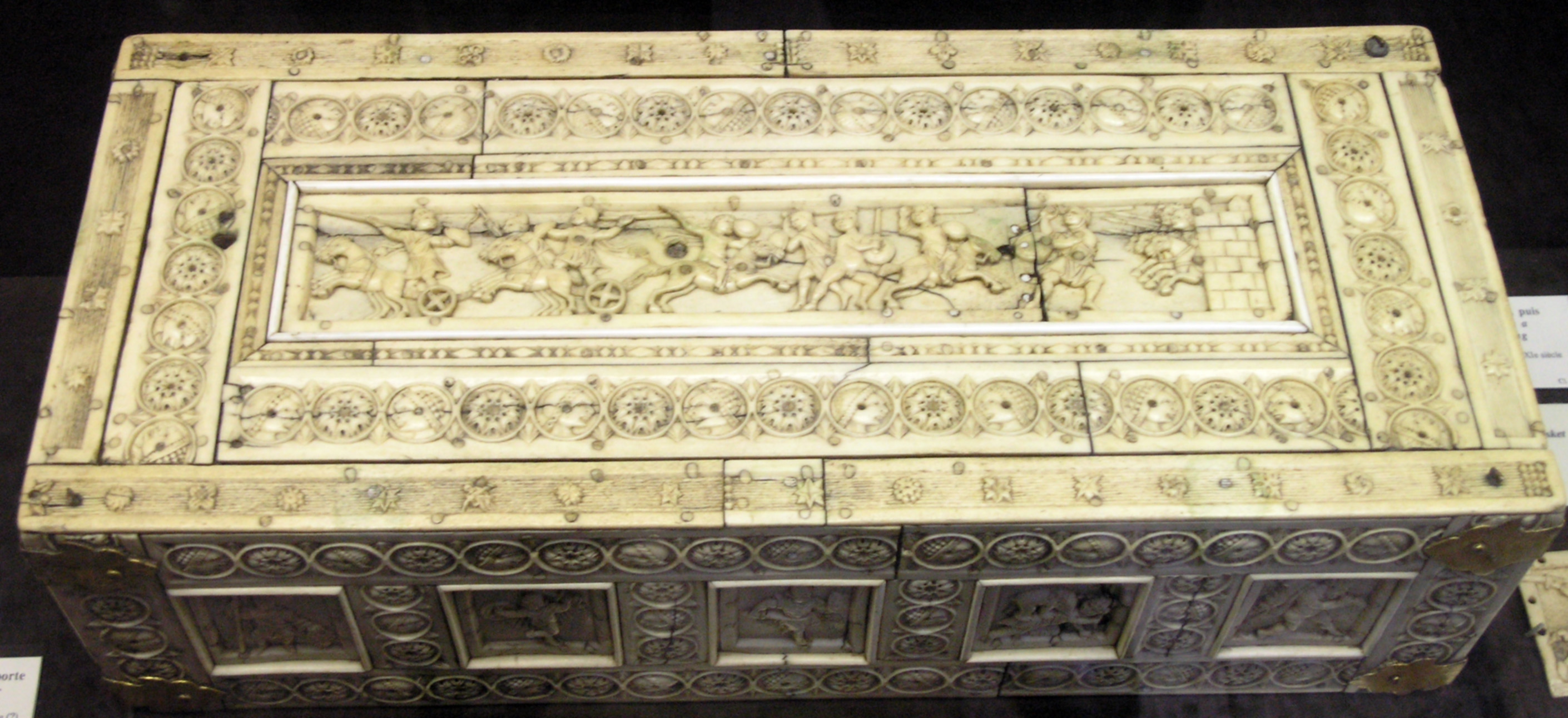
Between 900 and 1100, Musée national du Moyen Âge

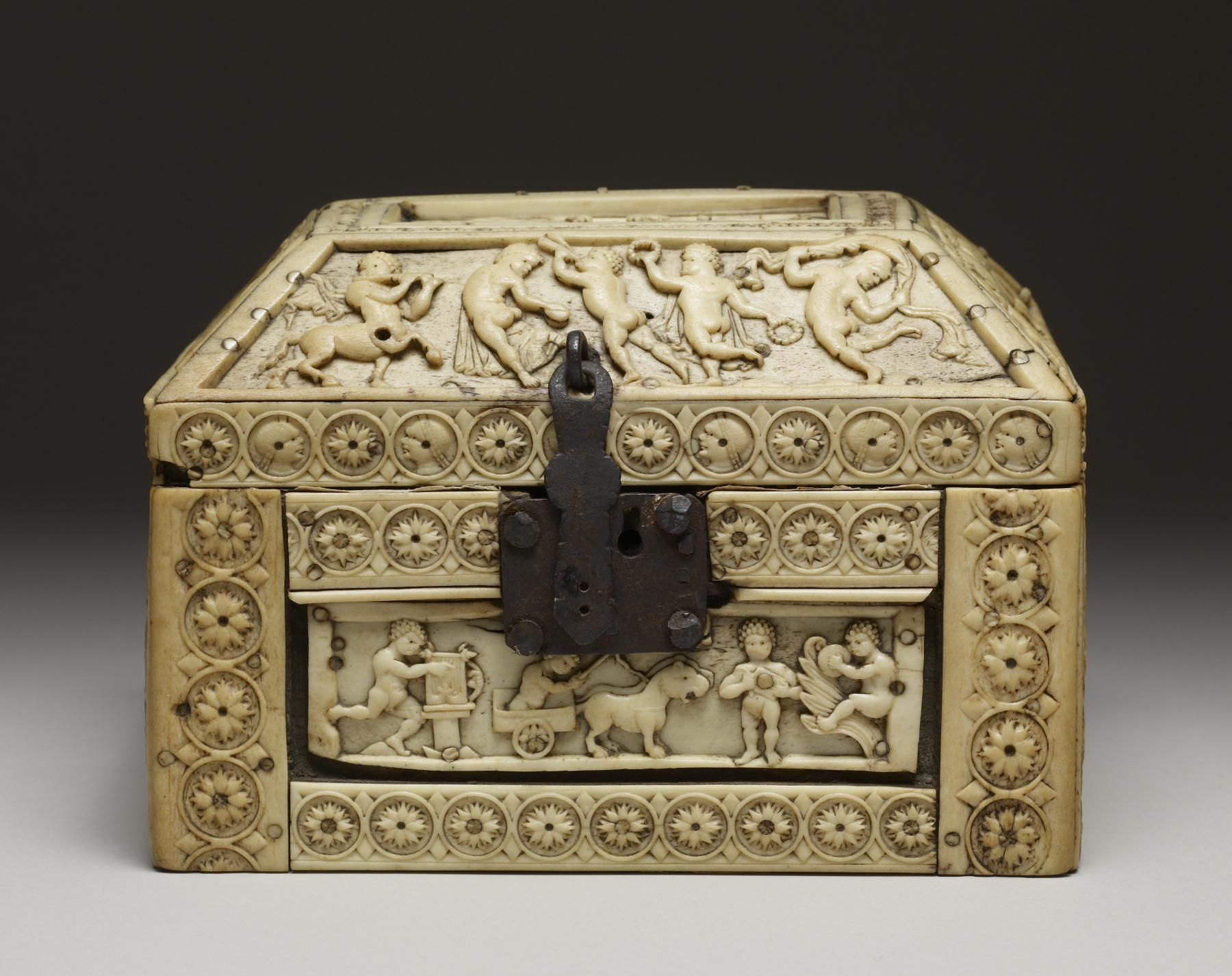
With images of Cupids (10th century), Walters Art Museum

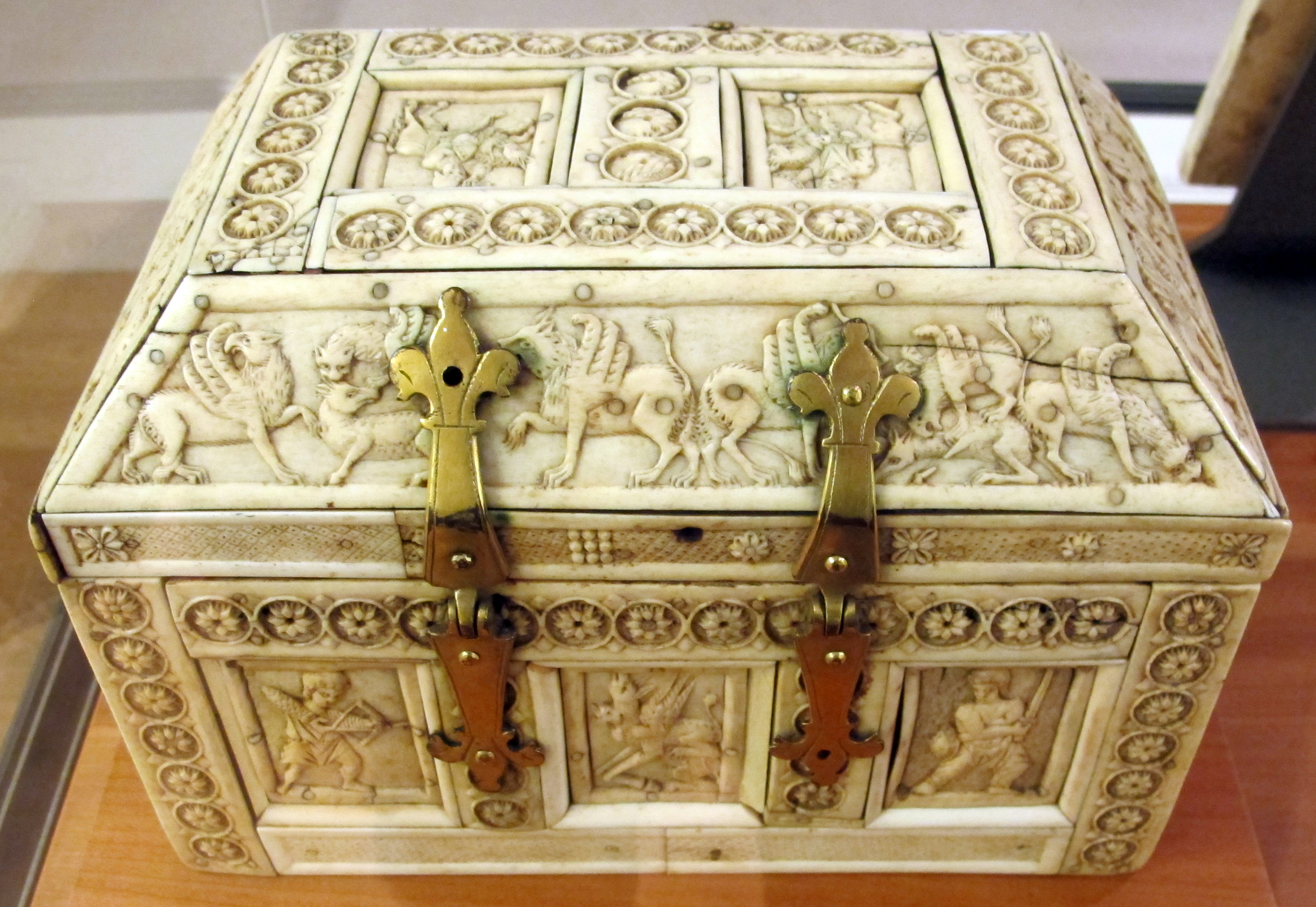
10th–11th century, Petit Palais

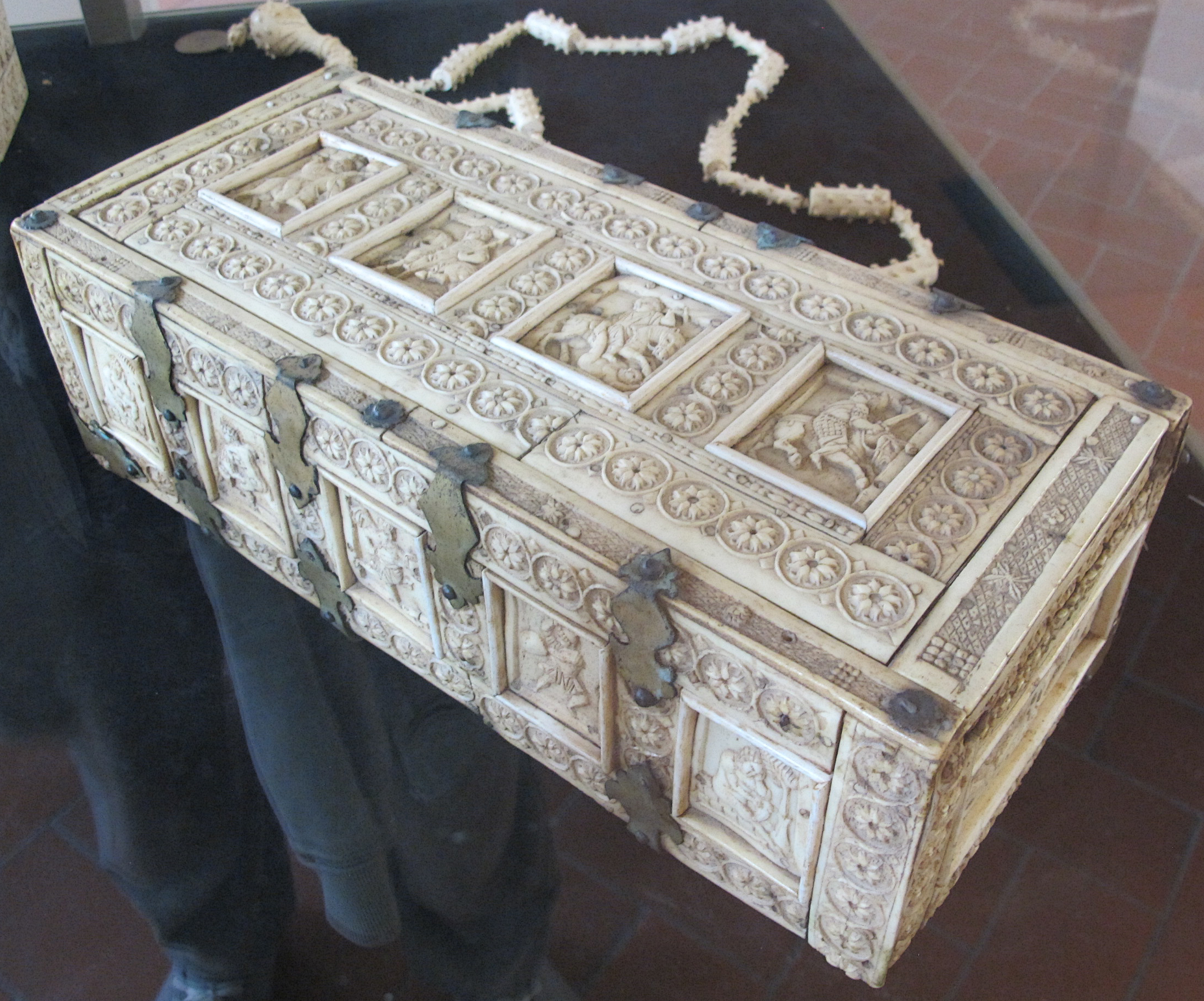
11th–12th century, Museo Nazionale d'Arte Medievale e Moderna (Arezzo)

=== Palaeologan age ===
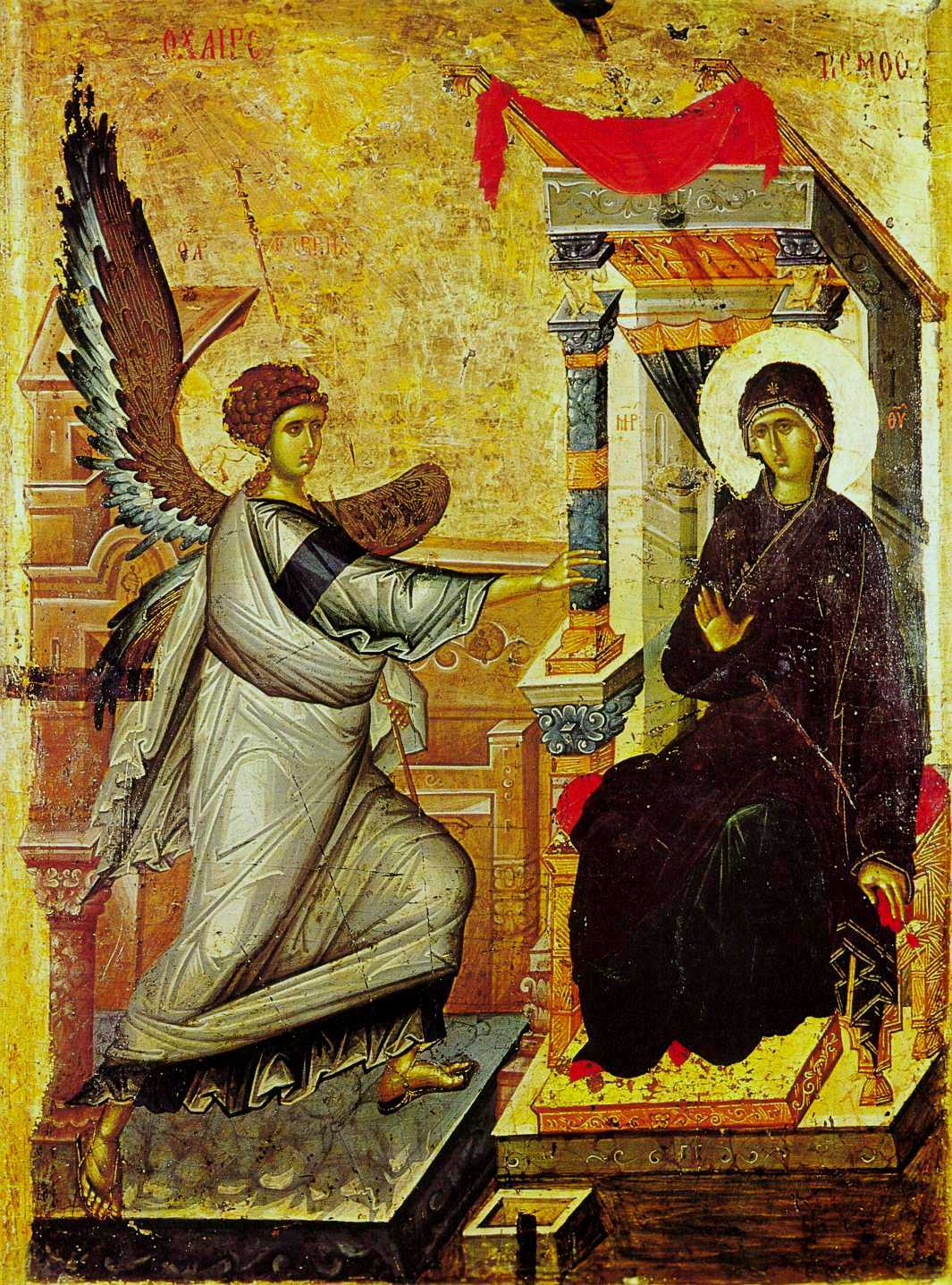
The Annunciation from Ohrid, one of the most admired icons of the Paleologan mannerism, bears comparison with the finest contemporary works by Italian artists

Centuries of continuous Roman political tradition and Hellenistic civilization underwent a crisis in 1204 with the sacking of Constantinople by the Venetian and French knights of the Fourth Crusade, a disaster from which the Empire recovered in 1261 albeit in a severely weakened state. The destruction by sack or subsequent neglect of the city's secular architecture in particular has left us with an imperfect understanding of Byzantine art.

Although the Byzantines regained the city in 1261, the Empire was thereafter a small and weak state confined to the Greek peninsula and the islands of the Aegean. During their half-century of exile, however, the last great flowering of Anatolian Hellenism began. As Nicaea emerged as the center of opposition under the Laskaris emperors, it spawned a renaissance, attracting scholars, poets, and artists from across the Byzantine world. A glittering court emerged as the dispossessed intelligentsia found in the Hellenic side of their traditions a pride and identity unsullied by association with the hated "latin" enemy. With the recapture of the capital under the new Palaeologan Dynasty, Byzantine artists developed a new interest in landscapes and pastoral scenes, and the traditional mosaic-work (of which the Chora Church in Constantinople is the finest extant example) gradually gave way to detailed cycles of narrative frescoes (as evidenced in a large group of Mystras churches). The icons, which became a favoured medium for artistic expression, were characterized by a less austere attitude, new appreciation for purely decorative qualities of painting and meticulous attention to details, earning the popular name of the Paleologan Mannerism for the period in general.

Venice came to control Byzantine Crete by 1212, and Byzantine artistic traditions continued long after the Ottoman conquest of the last Byzantine successor state in 1461. The Cretan school, as it is today known, gradually introduced Italian Renaissance elements into its style, and exported large numbers of icons to Italy. The tradition's most famous artist was El Greco.

== Legacy ==
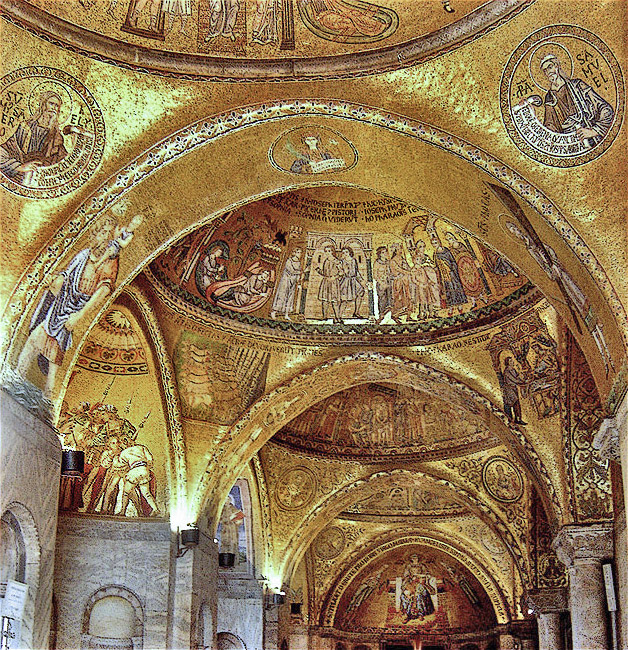
St Mark's Basilica in Venice, where imported Byzantine mosaicists were succeeded by Italians they had trained

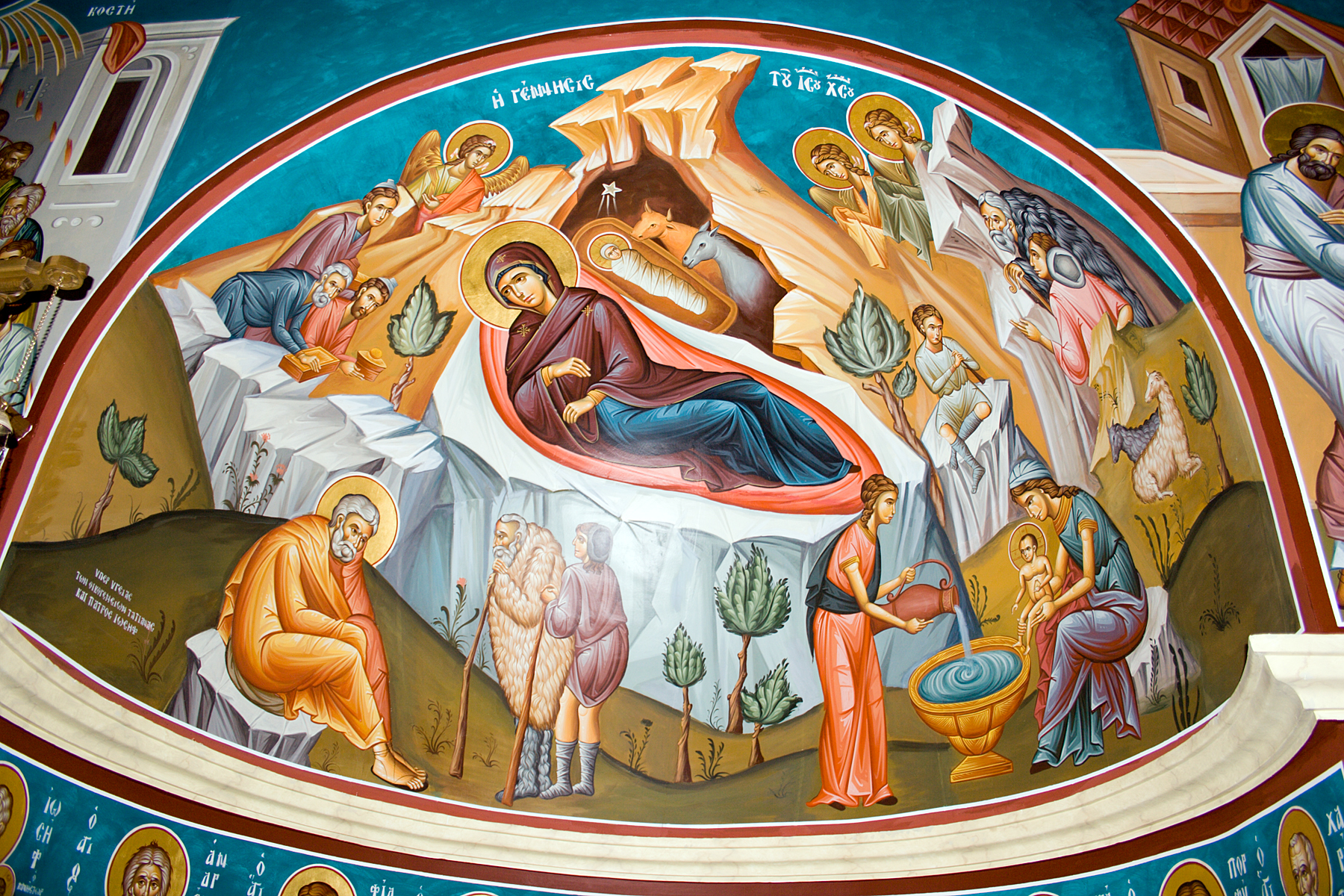
Modern Orthodox mural from Israel using a depiction of the Nativity of Christ little changed in over a millennium

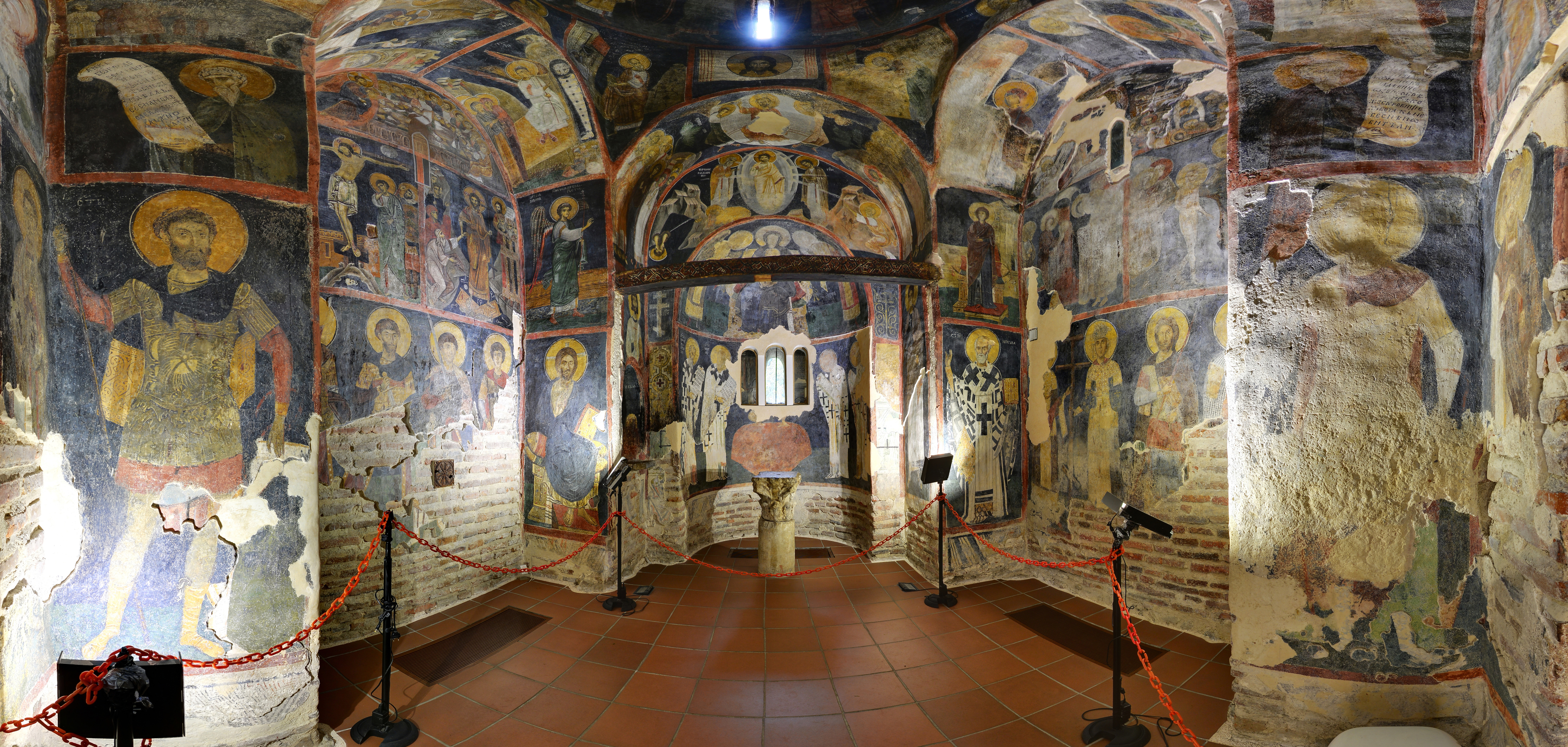
Interior view with the frescoes dating back to 1259, Boyana Church in Sofia, UNESCO World Heritage List landmark.

The Byzantine Empire emerged from the Roman Empire in the 4th century AD, and its unique culture heavily influenced Western Europe during the Middle Ages and the Renaissance. Byzantine art was an essential part of this culture and had certain defining characteristics, such as intricate patterns, rich colors, and religious themes depicting important figures in Christianity.

The fall of Constantinople in 1453 was a significant event in the history of the Byzantine Empire, and it had a profound impact on the art world. Many Byzantine artists and intellectuals migrated to Italy, where they played a vital role in shaping the Italian Renaissance. The migration was partly due to the long-standing cultural and commercial ties between the Byzantine Empire and Italian city-states, such as Venice and Florence, as well as the decline of the Byzantine Empire in the preceding centuries.

The influence of Byzantine art on Italian art was significant, with Byzantine artists bringing their techniques and knowledge to Italy, such as the use of gold leaf and mosaics. They also played a significant role in developing perspective, which became a key element of Renaissance art.

The splendour of Byzantine art was always in the mind of early medieval Western artists and patrons, and many of the most important movements in the period were conscious attempts to produce art fit to stand next to both classical Roman and contemporary Byzantine art. This was especially the case for the imperial Carolingian art and Ottonian art. Luxury products from the Empire were highly valued, and reached for example the royal Anglo-Saxon Sutton Hoo burial in Suffolk of the 620s, which contains several pieces of silver. Byzantine silks were especially valued and large quantities were distributed as diplomatic gifts from Constantinople. There are records of Byzantine artists working in the West, especially during the period of iconoclasm, and some works, like the frescos at Castelseprio and miniatures in the Vienna Coronation Gospels, seem to have been produced by such figures.

In particular, teams of mosaic artists were dispatched as diplomatic gestures by emperors to Italy, where they often trained locals to continue their work in a style heavily influenced by Byzantium. Venice and Norman Sicily were particular centres of Byzantine influence. The earliest surviving panel paintings in the West were in a style heavily influenced by contemporary Byzantine icons, until a distinctive Western style began to develop in Italy in the Trecento; the traditional and still influential narrative of Vasari and others has the story of Western painting begin as a breakaway by Cimabue and then Giotto from the shackles of the Byzantine tradition. In general, Byzantine artistic influence on Europe was in steep decline by the 14th century if not earlier, despite the continued importance of migrated Byzantine scholars in the Renaissance in other areas.

Islamic art began with artists and craftsmen mostly trained in Byzantine styles, and though figurative content was greatly reduced, Byzantine decorative styles remained a great influence on Islamic art, and Byzantine artists continued to be imported for important works for some time, especially for mosaics.

The Byzantine era properly defined came to an end with the fall of Constantinople to the Ottoman Turks in 1453, but by this time the Byzantine cultural heritage had been widely diffused, carried by the spread of Orthodox Christianity, to Bulgaria, Serbia, Romania and, most importantly, to Russia, which became the centre of the Orthodox world following the Ottoman conquest of the Balkans. Even under Ottoman rule, Byzantine traditions in icon-painting and other small-scale arts survived, especially in the Venetian-ruled Crete and Rhodes, where a "post-Byzantine" style under increasing Western influence survived for a further two centuries, producing artists including El Greco whose training was in the Cretan School which was the most vigorous post-Byzantine school, exporting great numbers of icons to Europe. The willingness of the Cretan School to accept Western influence was atypical; in most of the post-Byzantine world "as an instrument of ethnic cohesiveness, art became assertively conservative during the Turcocratia" (period of Ottoman rule).

Russian icon painting began by entirely adopting and imitating Byzantine art, as did the art of other Orthodox nations, and has remained extremely conservative in iconography, although its painting style has developed distinct characteristics, including influences from post-Renaissance Western art. All the Eastern Orthodox churches have remained highly protective of their traditions in terms of the form and content of images and, for example, modern Orthodox depictions of the Nativity of Christ vary little in content from those developed in the 6th century.

== See also ==
- Byzantine illuminated manuscripts
- Byzantine architecture
- Byzantine mosaics
- Macedonian art (Byzantine)
- Byzantine silver
- Byzantine Iconoclasm
- Sacred art
- Book of Job in Byzantine Illuminated Manuscripts
