= Throne of Maximian =

Cathedra (episcopal throne) made for Archbishop Maximianus of Ravenna

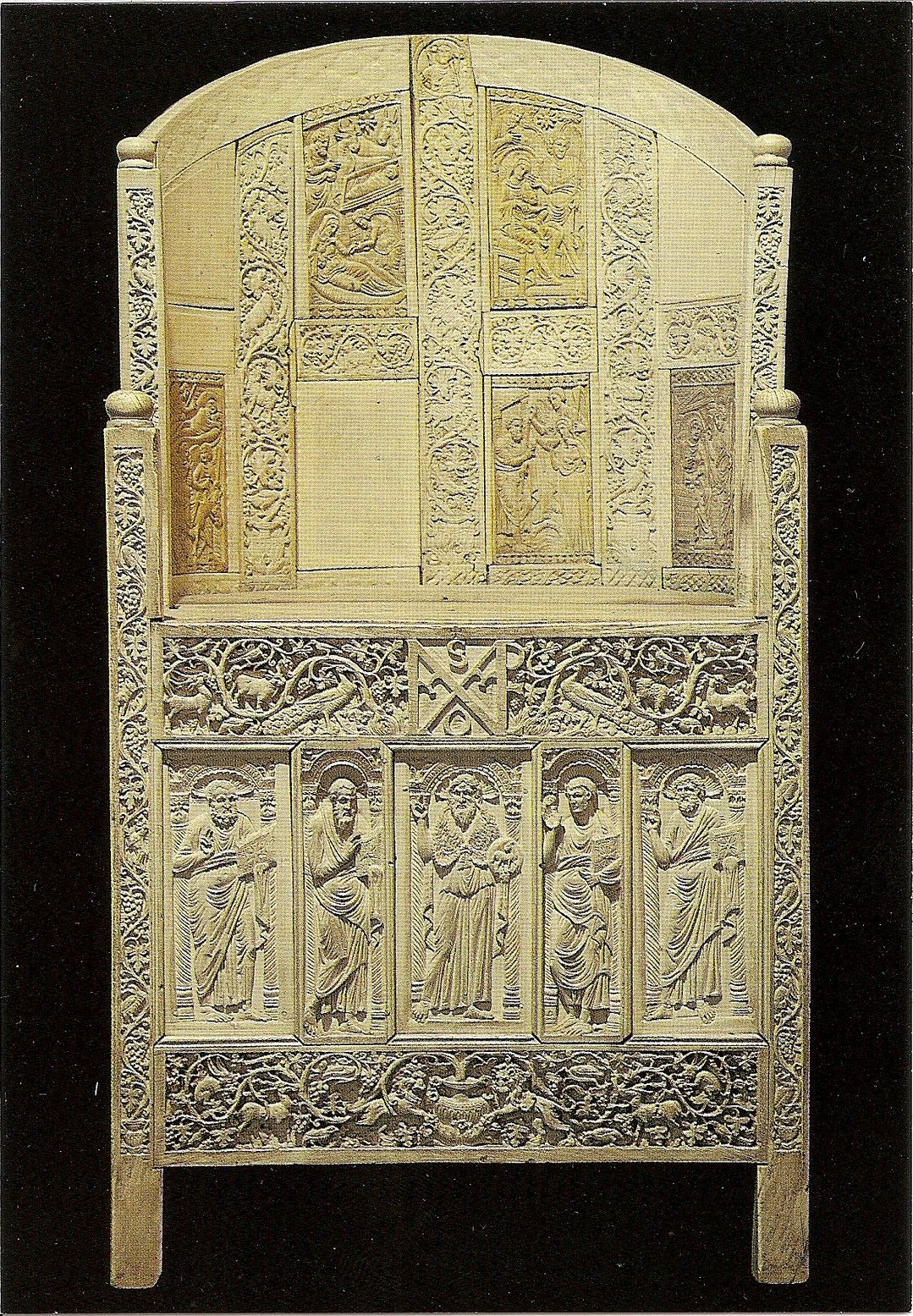
- Material: Wood and ivory
- Size: 150 x 65 cm
- Created: c.500-550
- Present location: Archiepiscopal Museum, Ravenna, Italy

The Throne of Maximian (or Maximianus) is a cathedra (episcopal throne) that was made for Archbishop Maximianus of Ravenna and is now on display at the Archiepiscopal Museum, Ravenna. It is generally agreed that the throne was carved in the Greek East of the Byzantine Empire and shipped to Ravenna, but there has long been scholarly debate over whether it was made in Constantinople or Alexandria.

The style of the throne is a mixture of Early Christian art and that of the First Golden Age of Byzantine art. It is made of carved ivory panels, with frames of winding vines and grapevines, on a wooden frame. The throne itself is large with a high semi-circular back and may have held a jewelled cross or Gospel book for some of the time. The ivory carvings are done in relief and the panels depict important biblical figures. The back of the throne shows scenes of the Life of Christ, the sides include scenes of the Story of Joseph from the Book of Genesis, and on the front of the throne are the Four evangelists around John the Baptist, who is holding a medallion with the Lamb of God and Maximian's name above him.

== Historical context ==
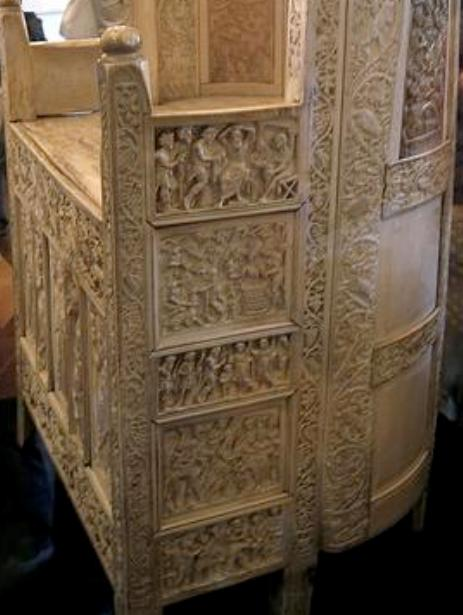
Side view

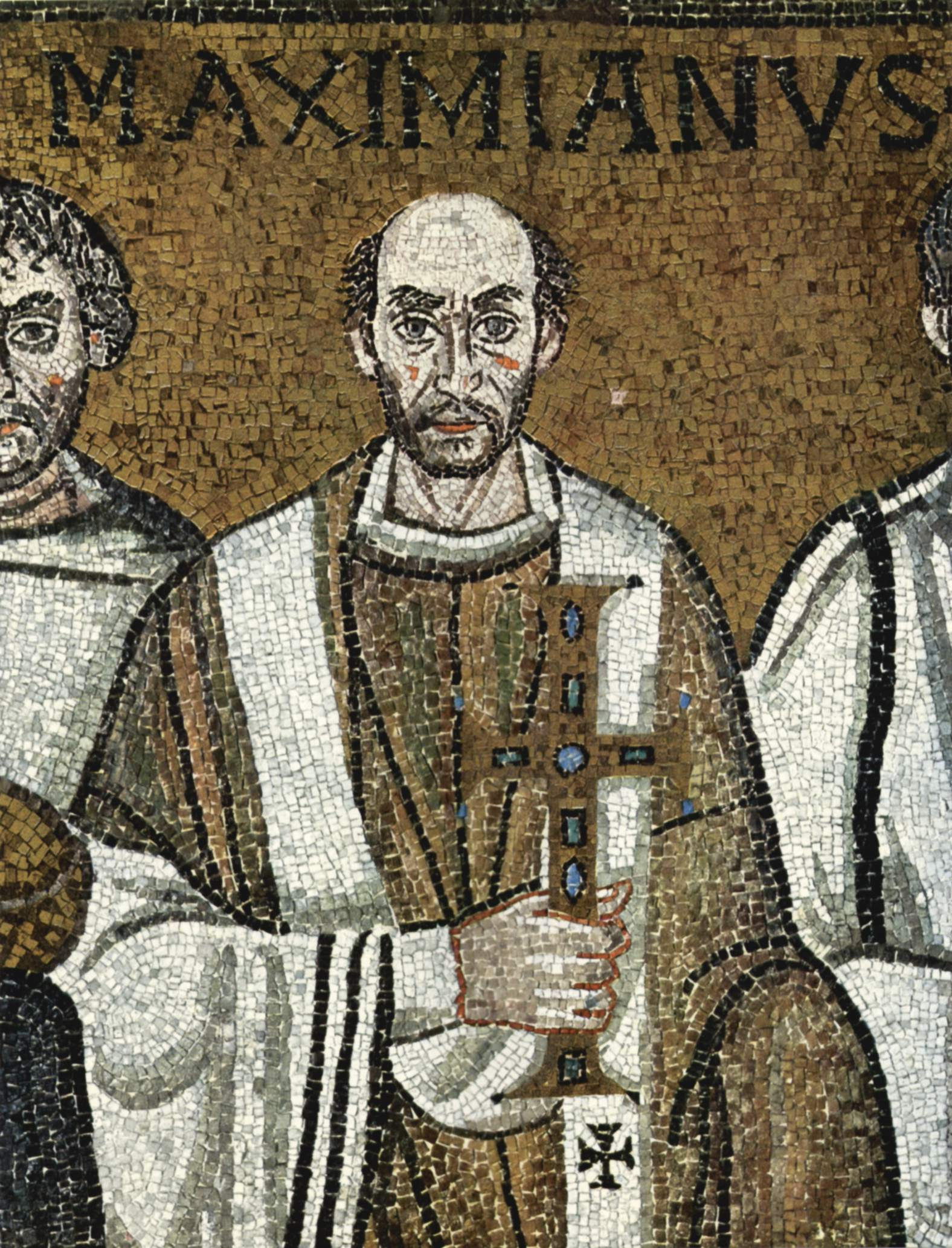
Detail of the San Vitale mosaic showing Maximian

Maximian was "a poor deacon of Pola who rose to a high position through his political adroitness" as a protégé of Justinian I. He had not been wanted as archbishop by the people of Ravenna, but "by shrewd maneuvres he overcame their opposition, and won their respect by his discretion, generosity, and great enterprises of church building and decoration". He is shown, and named in a large titulus, in the famous mosaic in the Basilica of San Vitale of Justinian surrounded by his ministers and bodyguards (matched by a panel for the Empress). His throne can be dated to about 545–553, and is believed to have been carved in Constantinople, and shipped to Ravenna. It was probably commissioned by Justinian as a gift for Maximianus for becoming the new archbishop and to encourage and strengthen his authority because he was not always popular.

The throne portrays Justinian's presence in Ravenna, which had been the western capital of the Roman Empire and the Byzantine Empire. Maximian may well have acted as regent for the Emperor in the remaining Byzantine territory in Italy, and it is possible that it was intended to be left as an empty throne symbolizing the authority of God or the Emperor, or both. Many had also believed that the throne was not intended to be of personal use by the Archbishop, but was to be an empty throne that symbolized the imperial or divine power. The cathedra was positioned in the center of the apse in the cathedral with the benches of assisting priests on either side. The throne was also carried during religious ceremonies. The decorated back and side of the throne suggested that the throne was designed to be moved out of the apse and placed near the chancel while the bishop addressed the congregation, instead of being left stationary against the wall.

The gift was also for the dedication of San Vitale; Justinian hired 6th-century Byzantine artists, who were summoned by the court to Constantinople from around the Empire, to create this piece. The style of the ivories and even the use of ivory itself suggest that the throne belongs to the School of Ivory Carving. It is also suggested, due to differing styles within the throne, that some components or even the entire throne was possibly carved in Alexandria. However, it is argued that the cult of St Menas was not just confined to Egypt, but there was a church dedicated to him in Constantinople. One argument advanced for an origin in Egypt is the local relevance of the story of Joseph, which is given such prominence, but Meyer Schapiro demonstrates an artistic and literary tradition using Joseph, who rose to be minister to his pharaoh, as a symbol for the role a bishop, which at this period typically involved a considerable role in civil government.

== Technical analysis ==
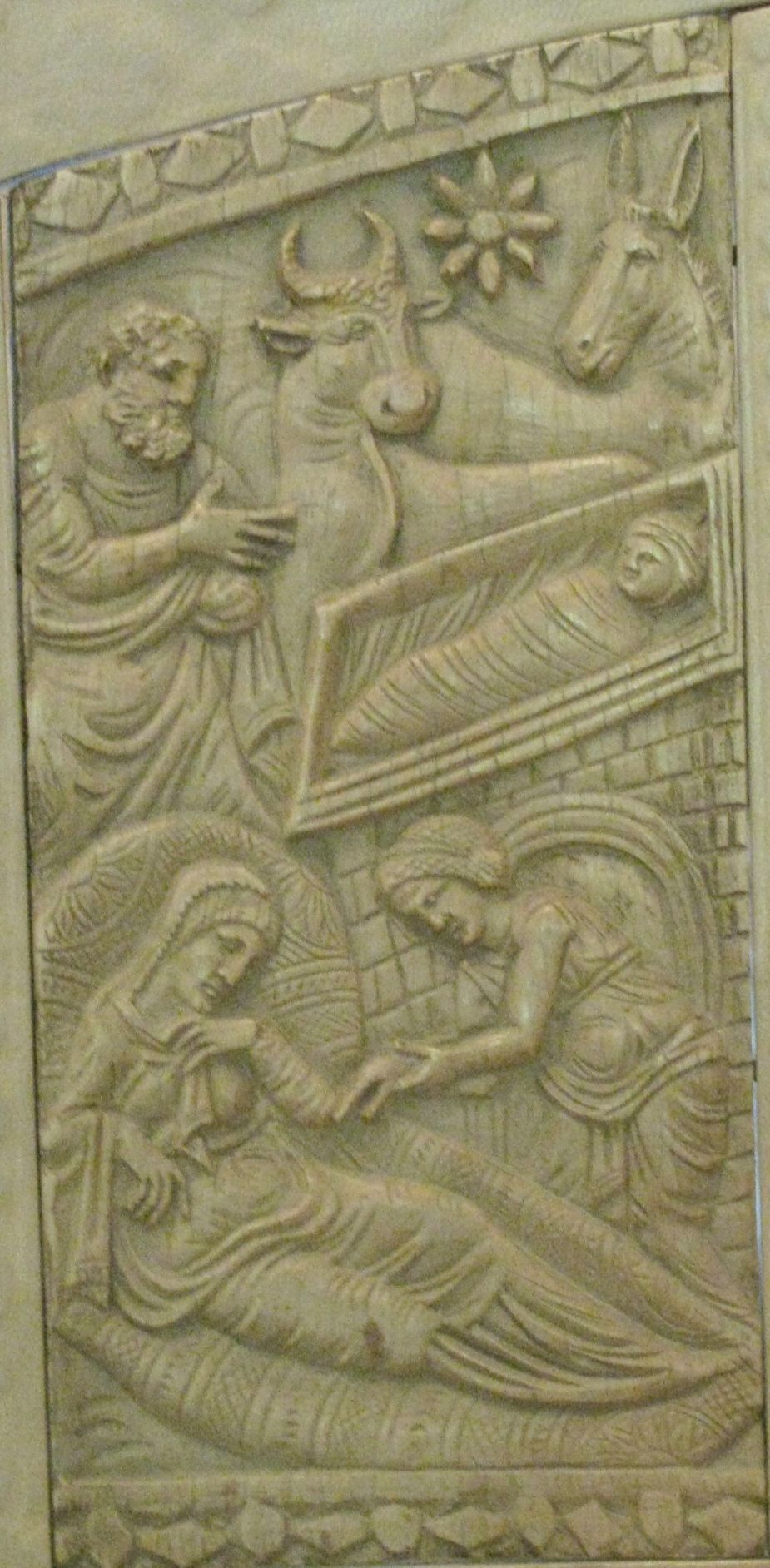
Nativity scene

Ivory carving was used in many luxury Byzantine sculptures including diptychs such as that showing the Adoration of the Magi and the Barberini Diptych, representing Justinian as Holy Emperor. The throne is the largest single Late Antique work of art made of ivory, and derives attraction from its simple and proportionate lines along with its elaborate carvings.

The size of the throne and clear stylistic variations between the panels suggest that it involved the work of several 6th century Byzantine artists. The technique of the panels suggests that at least two different artists of unequal skills had executed the carvings due to differing styles. Although the general style of the panels can be recognized, the panels on the front are sketchy compared to the scenes on the side and back of the chair, which are very bold and rather careless.

The dimensions are 22" (0.6m) wide x 4’11" (1.5m) high. Of the panels on the back of the throne, only 16 of the 24 panels have survived or been restored. The piece is currently preserved and displayed in the Museo Arcivescovile, which also holds the Chapel of Sant’Adrea and works from the old cathedral. The Byzantine Church did not favor sculpture in the round, fearing that it would recall idols from Greek and Roman pagan religion. Thus, small carvings in relief were created and allowed. This style of carving involves carving figures that project slightly from the background rather than free standing. This creates a piece with a mixture of 2 and 3 dimensionality.

The two different techniques of two different artists could be possibly explained by the pandemic plague that raged that time (c.ad.540, the Plague of Justinian). The plague spread to the Roman Empire from the East Africa through the Ivory route and the ivory workshop artists could be among early victims of the disease. The deterioration of the technique therefore could be explained by the decease of the initial principal master and the possible desire of the Emperor to finish the piece as soon as possible anyway.

== Formal and stylistic analysis ==
The Throne of Maximianus is a key work in what has been called the "Justinianic style" of early Byzantine art. The ivory exterior of the throne is conceived as a series of framed panels, though the apparent structural roles of the sections does not entirely reflect their actual function. An unusual feature is that the depth of the relief is generally deeper in the decorative "framing" sections than in the framed scenes. The overall scheme is extremely rich, if demonstrating a certain horror vacui. The artists adapted complicated patterns and designs from textiles and carvings of the Near East and conveyed them in their artworks. The framing elements of the throne are decorated with scrolling vines typical of Early Christian art, "inhabited" with animals and birds within the curling branches of vines.

Many scenes carved on the Throne of Maximianus, such as the miracle of Christ and the history of Joseph, can also be found in a variety of other works, including mosaics and manuscripts. The Four Evangelists portrayed on the front of the throne was also a very common motif used throughout the Medieval period. The figures show a strong preference for contrapposto poses, "an inheritance from Greek art, but which here become a kind of mannerism".

=== Individual scenes' similarities to other work of arts ===
- "Scene of Joseph assured by an Angel, occurs on an ivory casket in the Victoria and Albert Museum, and on a sarcophagus from Le Puy"
- "Annunciation scene, occurs on the ivory book-covers of the Echmiadzin Gospels, and the book covers in the Bibliotheque Nationale"
- "The test of the virgin by Water, occurs on the Uwaroff ivory and the fragment of the Murano covers in the Stroganoff Collection"
- One of 26 mosaic panels in Sant’Apollinare Nuovo, Ravenna (Miracle of Loaves and Fishes)
- Church of San Vitale (4 Evangelists)
- Dome Mosaic in Battistero Neoniano in Ravenna (baptist of Christ)

== Iconographical analysis ==
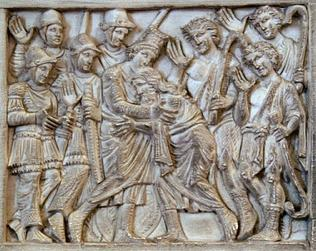
Scene from the story of Joseph

The Throne of Maximianus symbolizes a seat of authority and status. A throne is recognized as a seat for someone with power in the Medieval times. The chair not only signifies the resting of the body, but also the focusing of the mind. In a setting like a Cathedral, the chair is given a role of reflecting the religious and spiritual attitudes of the attendants of the church. A cathedra is the official seat of a bishop.

On the Throne of Maximianus, there are scenes of the Old and New Testament depicting the Story of Joseph and the Life of Christ. The scenes of the New Testament hold a peculiar resemblance to Egyptian examples of the New Testaments and they are continued in the seventh century on Coptic monuments.

=== Front of the seat ===
At the front of the seat, there are a total of five panels. Four of the panels portray the Evangelists holding their Gospel books. The last panel illustrates John the Baptist, holding his emblem of the lamb. This is a very common theme that is depicted in many manuscripts and mosaics.

The designs of the throne's front include the vine-stem design, which was heavily used in Early Christian art. The artists that created the throne incorporated animals and birds within the vines. On the lower border of the front of the seat contains two lion guards guarding the vase from which the vines emerge. On the top border, there are a pair of peacocks surrounding the monogram of Archbishop Maximianus. The peacocks symbolize birds of immortality.

=== Side of the seat ===
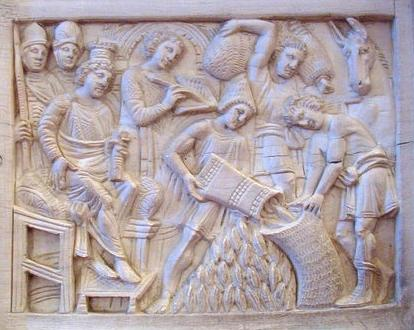
Another Joseph scene

On the side of the throne, there are 10 panels representing the events from the Story of Joseph in the Book of Genesis. The artistic style of these scenes is a Sixth-century style, which can be distinguished by the sketchiness of the carving. Scenes of the Life of Joseph, the choice of costumes, decoration and technique are consistently analogous to the Christian art of Egypt.

=== Back of the seat ===
The back of the throne consisted of 24 panels depicting the New Testament and more specifically, the Life of Christ and apocryphal scenes from the Life of the Virgin.

==== Individual scenes ====
- The Alexandrian-Coptic version of the nativity of Christ, depicted on the Throne of Maximian, shows the Virgin lying on a mattress, which is more of an Oriental theme. While the Western Nativities have the Virgin seated in a chair.
- The scene of Annunciation depicts the Virgin sitting to the left on a wicker chair spinning the purple garment for the temple. Other than the examples stated from above, this type of scene occurs only on monuments of the Coptic origin.
- The scene of the Story of Bethlehem, Joseph helping the pregnant Virgin onto the animal, which is led by an angel, is very rare of a scene in Early Christian art. This type of scene is most likely made in Alexandria whence it became a characteristic type in Coptic art.
