= Imperial diptych =

Theoretical type of ivory diptych

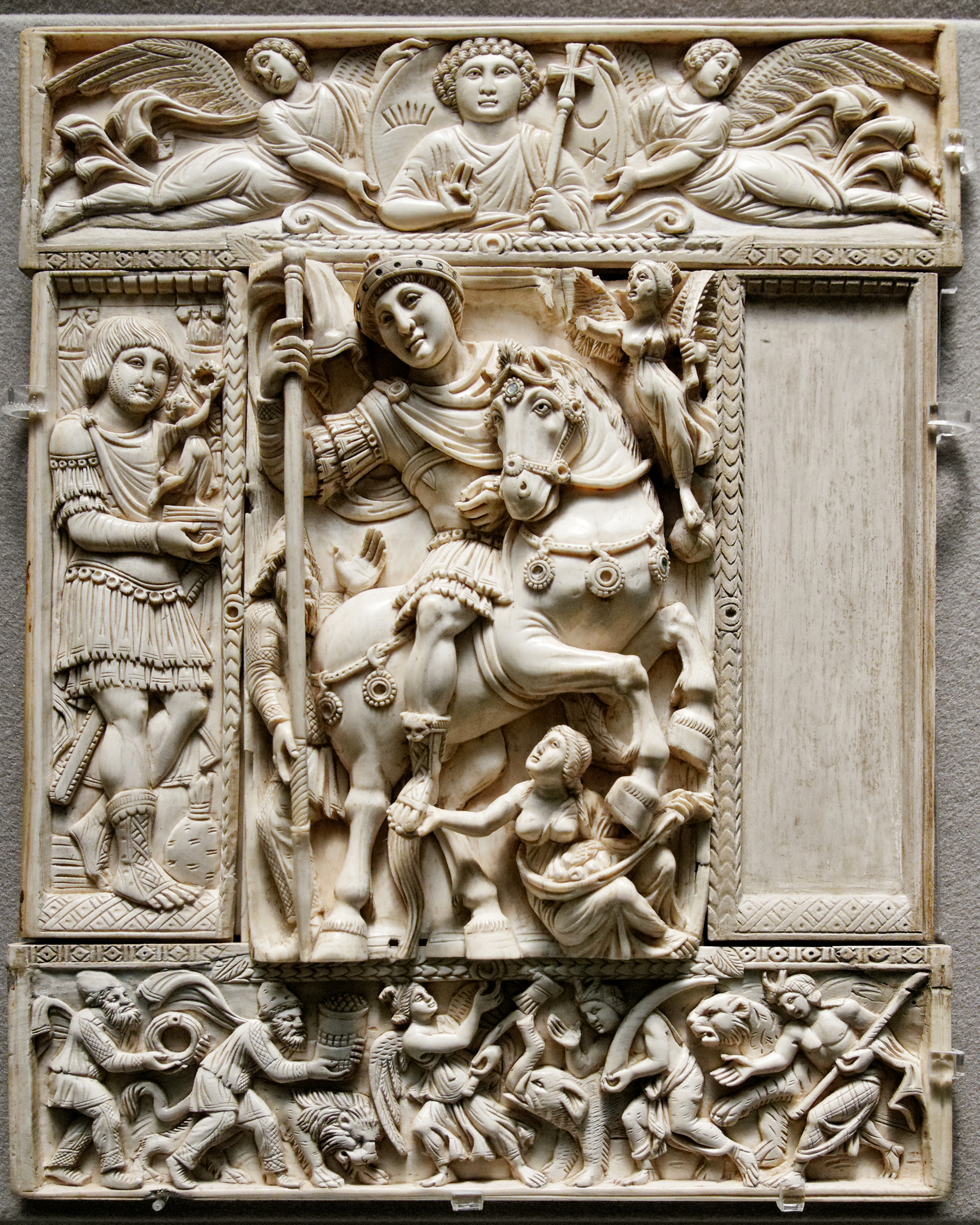
Barberini Ivory on display at the Louvre.

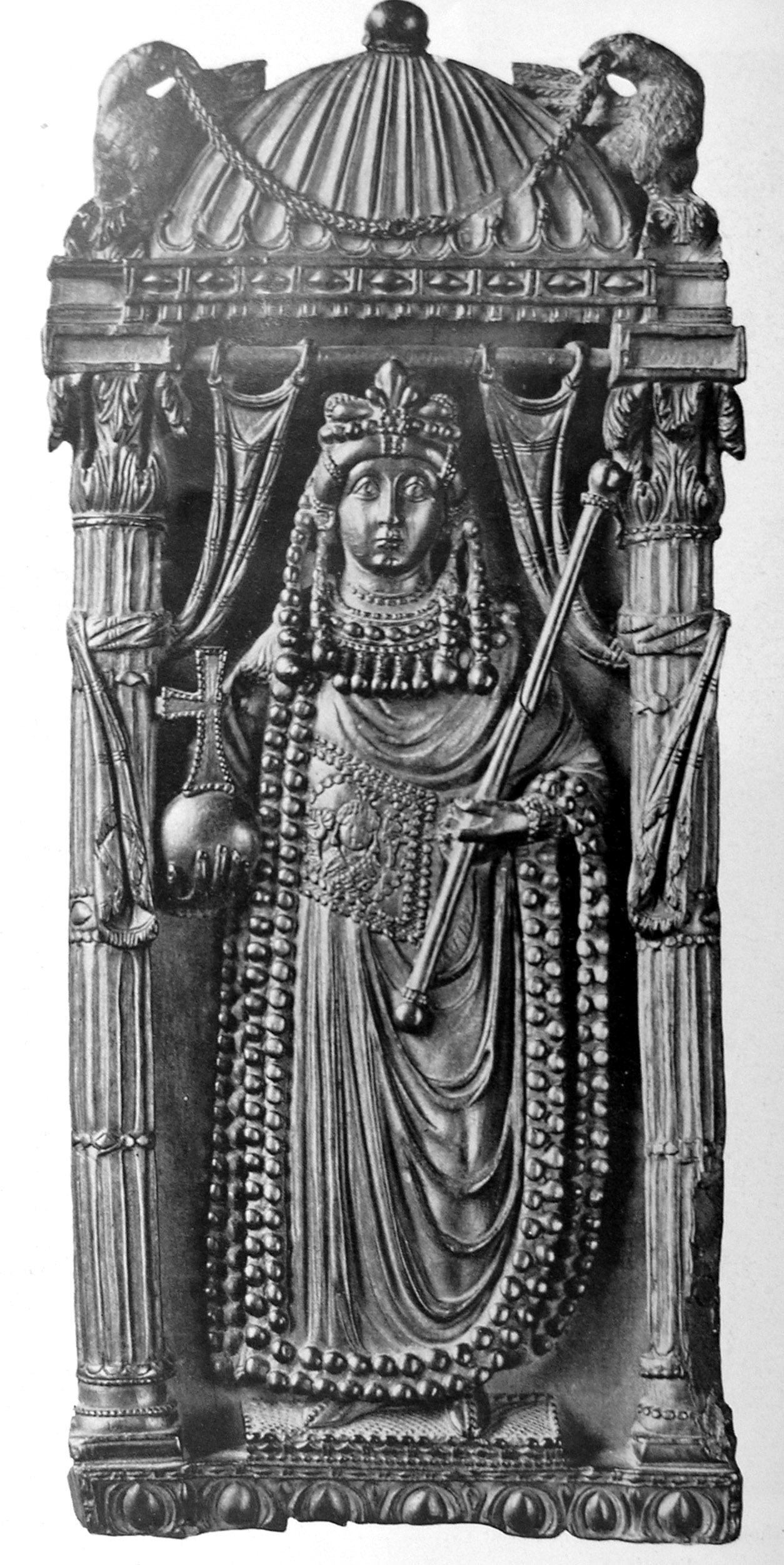
Panel of a possible imperial diptych representing the empress Ariadne, Bargello.

In Late Antiquity, an imperial diptych is a theoretical type of ivory diptych, made up of two leaves of five panels each and each with a central panel representing the emperor or empress. They are so-named in contrast to consular diptychs. They were produced as unique examples, whereas each consular diptych was produced in large numbers to offer to the emperor on certain occasions, principally a nobleman's entry to the consulship.

No complete example of an imperial diptych survives and so their existence is contested. The ivories specialist R. Delbrück has theorised that the 19 surviving fragments of ivory panels which clearly do not belong to the usual type of consular diptychs constitute evidence of imperial diptychs, despite having many characteristics in common with consular diptychs. The iconography of these diptychs obeys a stereotypical scheme, as illustrated by the Barberini ivory, which is the best example of the posited type - an imperial diptych's programme would be made up of a central figure of the emperor or empress, figures of dignitaries on its side panels, an upper register showing a personification of Constantinople or a medallion with a bust of Christ and a lower register showing barbarians making offerings to the emperor. However, the fact that the Barberini ivory was almost certainly not a diptych, but some kind of imperial icon without a second panel is a serious argument against the existence of the imperial diptych type.

The two panels representing the empress Ariadne, in the Bargello in Florence and the Kunsthistorisches Museum in Vienna, also belong to the hypothesized imperial diptych type. They are the only central panels of such a diptych (other than the Barberini ivory) to survive, since all other fragments of such diptychs are from side panels.
