= Maximianus of Ravenna =

Italian Roman Catholic saint

Saint Maximianus
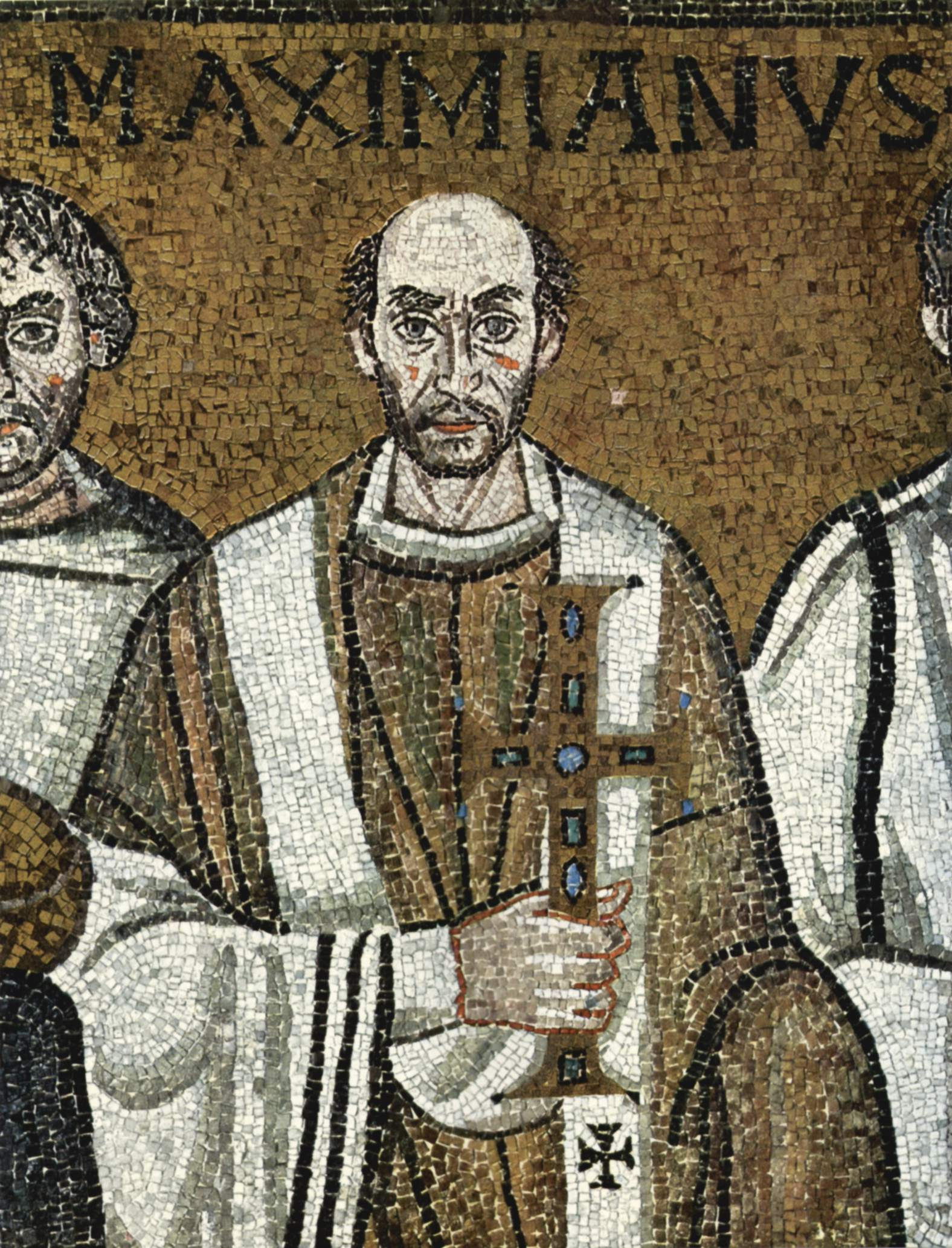
- Detail of Maximian in San Vitale, Ravenna

Archbishop of Ravenna
- Born: 499; Pula, Ostrogothic Kingdom
- Died: 556 (aged 57); Ravenna, Exarchate of Ravenna
- Venerated in: Roman Catholic Church; Eastern Orthodox Church
- Feast: February 21 (East); February 22 (West)

Maximianus of Ravenna, or Maximian (499 – February 22, 556; feast day formerly February 21) was bishop of Ravenna in Italy. Ravenna was then the capital of the Byzantine Empire's territories in Italy, and Maximianus's role may have included secular political functions.

== Life ==
Born in the Istrian town of Vistar (now Veštar) near Pola (Pula) in modern-day Croatia, Maximianus was consecrated bishop of Ravenna in 546 by Pope Vigilius in Patras, Greece. Maximianus was a forty-eight-year-old deacon from Pola when he became the twenty-sixth bishop of Ravenna. According to the ninth-century Ravennate priest Andreas Agnellus, Maximianus' flock initially refused his leadership, because he was selected by the emperor Justinian I and was not their initial candidate. To a modern art historian Meyer Shapiro, "Maximian was "a poor deacon of Pola who rose to a high position through his political adroitness" as a protégé of Justinian I. He had not been wanted as archbishop by the people of Ravenna, but "by shrewd maneuvers he overcame their opposition, and won their respect by his discretion, generosity, and great enterprises of church building and decoration".

He completed the Basilica of San Vitale and Sant'Apollinare in Classe in Ravenna, and built several other churches, including Santa Maria del Canneto in his native Istria.

Maximianus devoted himself to the revision of liturgical books and to the emendation of the Latin text of the Bible, and commissioned a large number of illuminated manuscripts. For the high altar in Ravenna he had a hanging made of the most costly cloth, which was embroidered with a portrayal of the entire life of Jesus. In another hanging he had portraits of all his predecessors embroidered on gold ground.

Maximian's most remarkable episcopal furnishing is the Throne of Maximian, the cathedra of the bishop which was constructed entirely of ivory panels. It was probably carved in Constantinople and shipped to Ravenna. It consists of decorative floral panels framing various figured panels, including one with the complex monogram of the bishop.

In a famous 6th-century mosaic in San Vitale, Maximianus (named above the figure) is with Emperor Justinian and his retinue. The saint holds a jewelled cross and wears early versions of an alb, chasuble and pallium.

He is regarded as a saint by both the Catholic and Orthodox churches, though essentially local to Ravenna, where there is a church dedicated to him at Piazza S. Massimiano, Punta Marina, Ravenna, 48020.

== Gallery ==
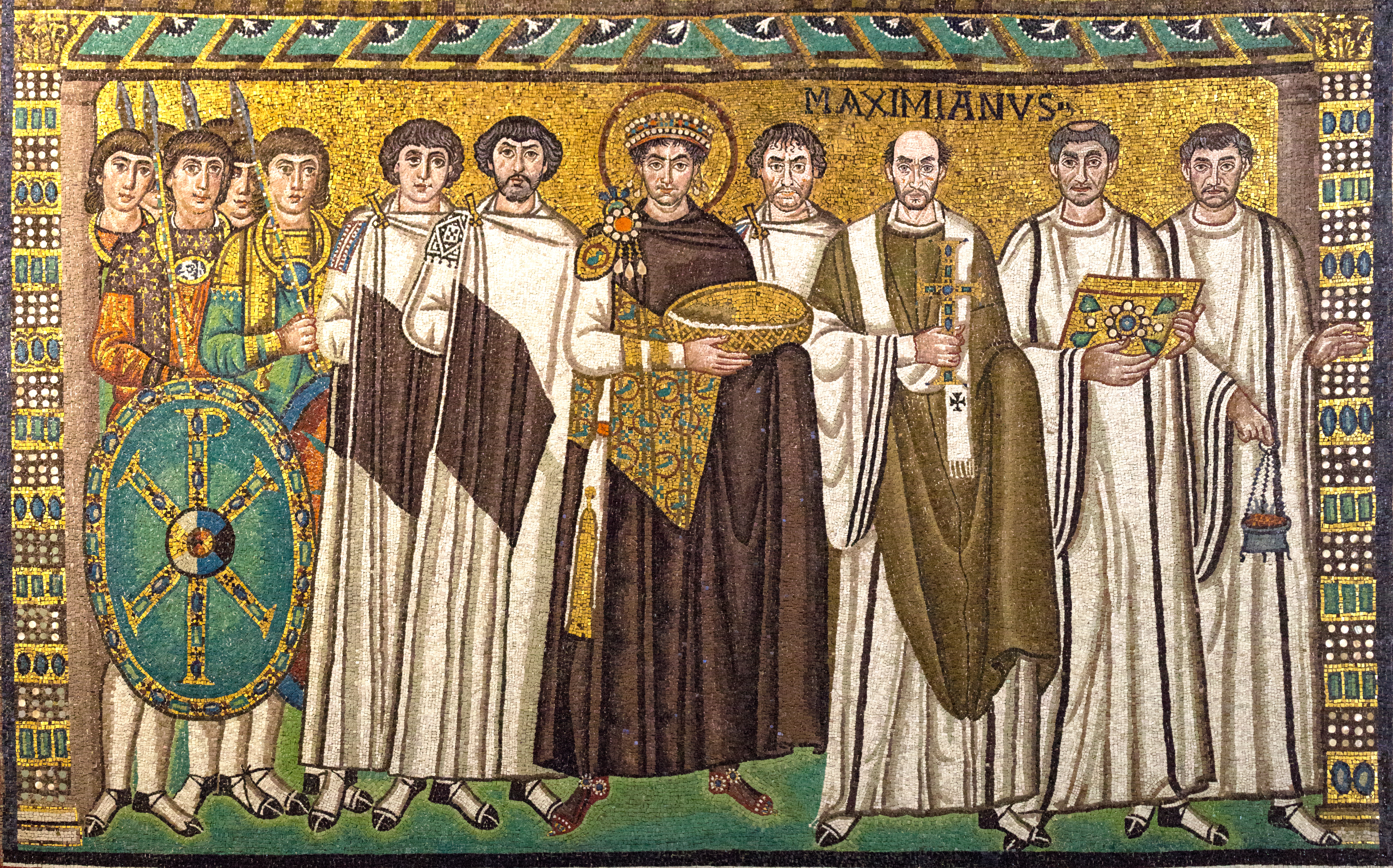
Emperor Justinian and his retinue, Maximian on his right.

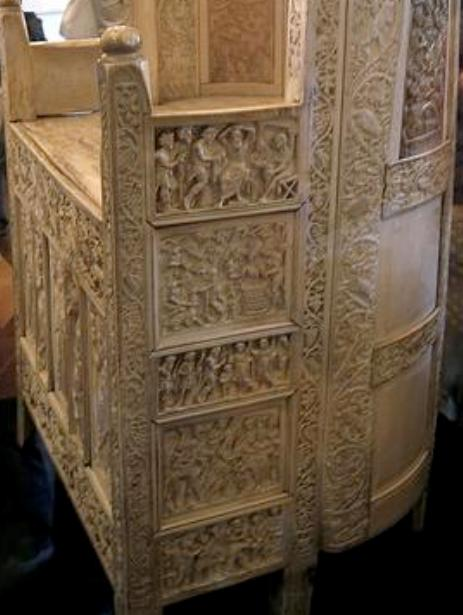
Side view of the Throne of Maximian

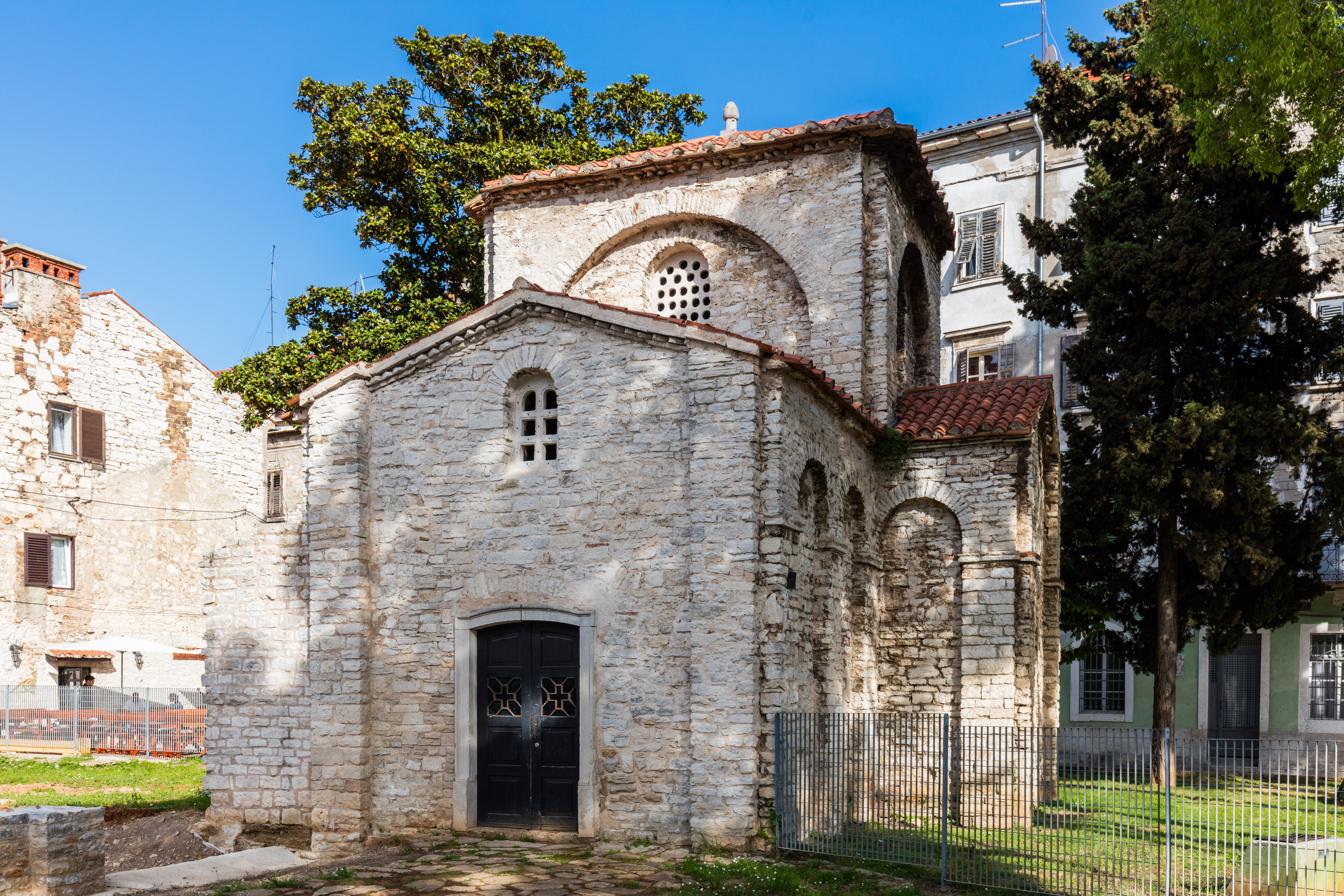
The surviving side chapel of the church of Santa Maria del Canneto
