= Barberini ivory =

Byzantine ivory leaf from an imperial diptych

Barberini Ivory
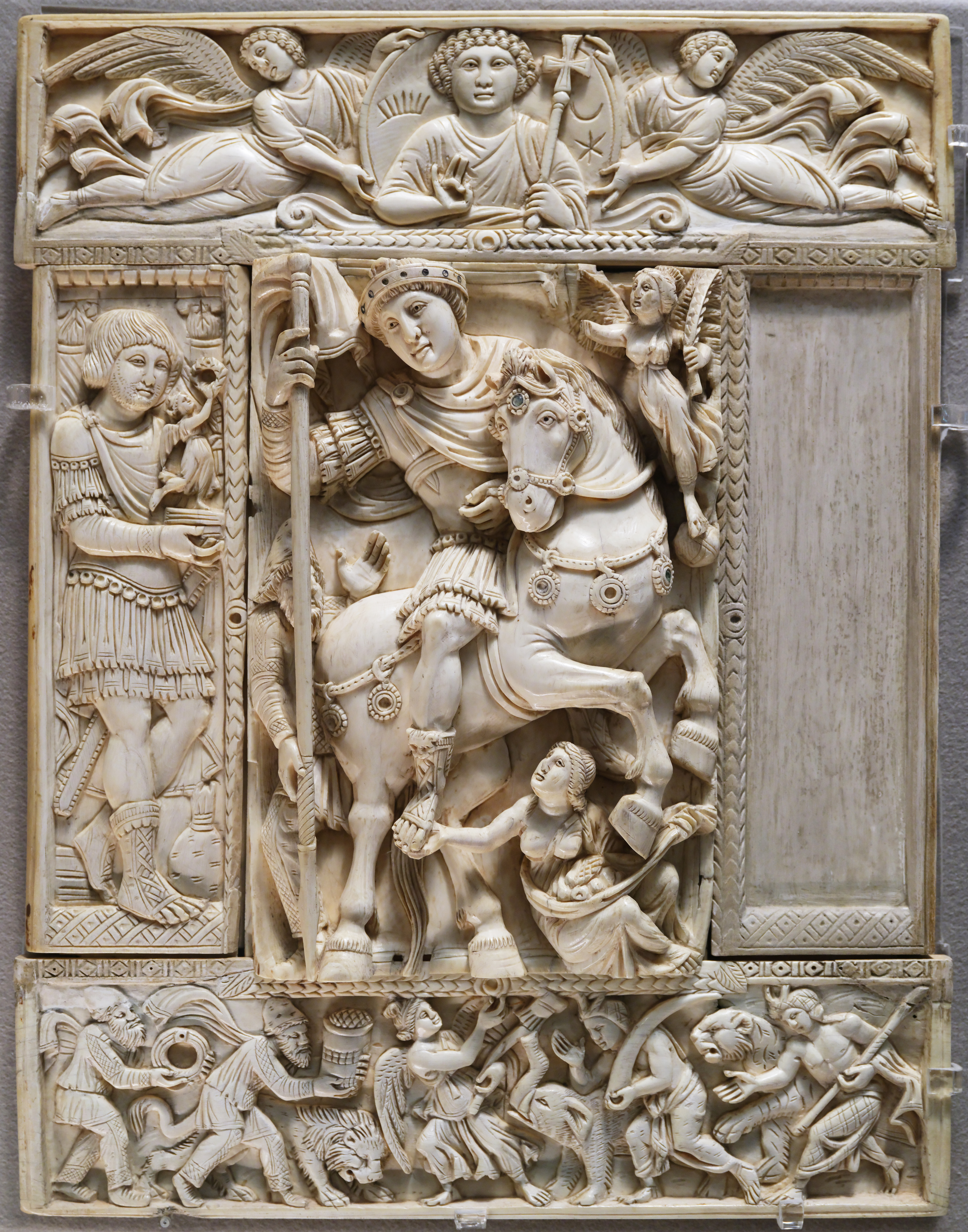
- Type: Relief sculpture
- Material: Ivory
- Symbols: Christ in Majesty; Victory; conquered barbarians; personifications of Earth and Plenty
- Created: Mid-6th century AD, Constantinople (probable)
- Present location: Musée du Louvre, Paris
- Classification: Early Byzantine art; imperial propaganda
- Culture: Byzantine Empire

The Barberini ivory is a Byzantine ivory leaf from an imperial diptych dating from Late Antiquity, now in the Louvre in Paris. It represents the emperor as triumphant victor. It is generally dated from the first half of the 6th century and is attributed to an imperial workshop in Constantinople, while the emperor is usually identified as Justinian, or possibly Anastasius I or Zeno. It is a notable historical document because it is linked to queen Brunhilda of Austrasia. On the back there is a list of names of Frankish kings, all relatives of Brunhilda, indicating her important position. Brunhilda ordered the list to be inscribed and offered it to the church as a votive image.

Although it is not a consular diptych, it shares many features of their decorative schemes. The emperor is accompanied in the main panel by a conquered barbarian in trousers at left, a crouching allegorical figure, probably representing territory conquered or reconquered, who holds his foot in thanks or submission, and an angel or victory, crowning the emperor with the traditional palm of victory (which is now lost). Although the barbarian is partly hidden by the emperor's huge spear, this does not pierce him, and he seems more astonished and over-awed than combative. Above, Christ, with a fashionable curled hair-style, is flanked by two more angels in the style of pagan victory figures; he reigns above, while the emperor represents him below on earth. In the bottom panel barbarians from West (left, in trousers) and East (right, with ivory tusks, a tiger and a small elephant) bring tribute, which includes wild animals. The figure in the left panel, representing a soldier, carries a statuette of Victory; his counterpart on the right is lost.

== Design ==
It was originally made up of five rectangular plaques, although that on the right has been replaced (perhaps in the 16th century) by a board bearing the inscription CONSTANT. N. IMP. CONST. The plaques are fitted together by tongue and groove joints, around a larger central plaque. Overall, the piece is the only such secular object to survive in such good condition. It measures 34.2 cm (13 in) high by 26.8 cm (11 in) wide overall, with the central panel 19 cm (7 in) high by 12.5 cm (5 in) wide by 2.5 cm (1 in) deep. It is made from elephant ivory, sculpted and mounted with precious stones (7 pearls survive). It carries no traces of polychromy, contrary to what certain historians have supposed.

It is not certain that the Barberini ivory belonged to a diptych, that is that there was a second set of plaques forming a second leaf with another portrait, perhaps of the empress – this first leaf is already too heavy to be comfortably used as a real writing tablet, and there is not trace of a hinge that could indicate it was a bookcover.

== Owners ==
The reverse of the object is flat and smooth, without the depression for wax which would be found on a consular diptych, which would be used as a writing tablet. Nevertheless, it is streaked with lines engraved later over older ink inscriptions – it includes a list of names (prayers for the dead), among whom can be seen the kings of Austrasia and other names, mostly Latin ones. Onomastics shows that the list comes from Auvergne and not from Provence as has been thought from the location of the object in the modern era. The inscriptions also date to the 7th century (maybe around 613) and show that the work was brought to Gaul early in its existence.

The ivory's history between then and 1625 is unknown – in that year it was offered by the leading antiquary Nicolas-Claude Fabri de Peiresc to the Papal legate Cardinal Francesco Barberini in Aix-en-Provence, becoming part of the Barberini collection in Rome. Peiresc mentions it specifically in a letter to his friend Palamède de Vallavez, dated 29 October 1625:

...[the cardinal] was pleased to see an ancient ivory bas-relief which I recovered a little earlier, where is represented the emperor Heraclius on horseback, with borders bearing a cross and his son Constantine carrying a Victory and many captive provinces beneath his feet, like that of the Grand 'Camayeul' of Tiberius. I gave it to him as he left (...) he had several similar pieces in the same manner in ivory, with which [my example] would go well.

We can very probably find confirmation of it being in the Barberini collection through a mention of an ivory representing Constantine in the inventory of sculptures in the possession of Francesco Barberini between 1626 and 1631. It was acquired by the Louvre in 1899 and has since then been in the département des objets d'art (inventory number OA 9063).

== Iconography ==
The work combines on the one hand a classic theme of the total power of the victorious emperor, crowned by Victory, whose universal rule is synonymous with peace and prosperity, and on the other hand the theme of Christian victory brought by Christ's patronage and blessing of the emperor. It introduces a new cosmic hierarchy into the representation of the triumph of the Roman Empire and is thus a highly political work designed to serve as imperial propaganda. The quality of the workmanship allows it to be attributed to an imperial workshop in Constantinople.

=== Central panel ===
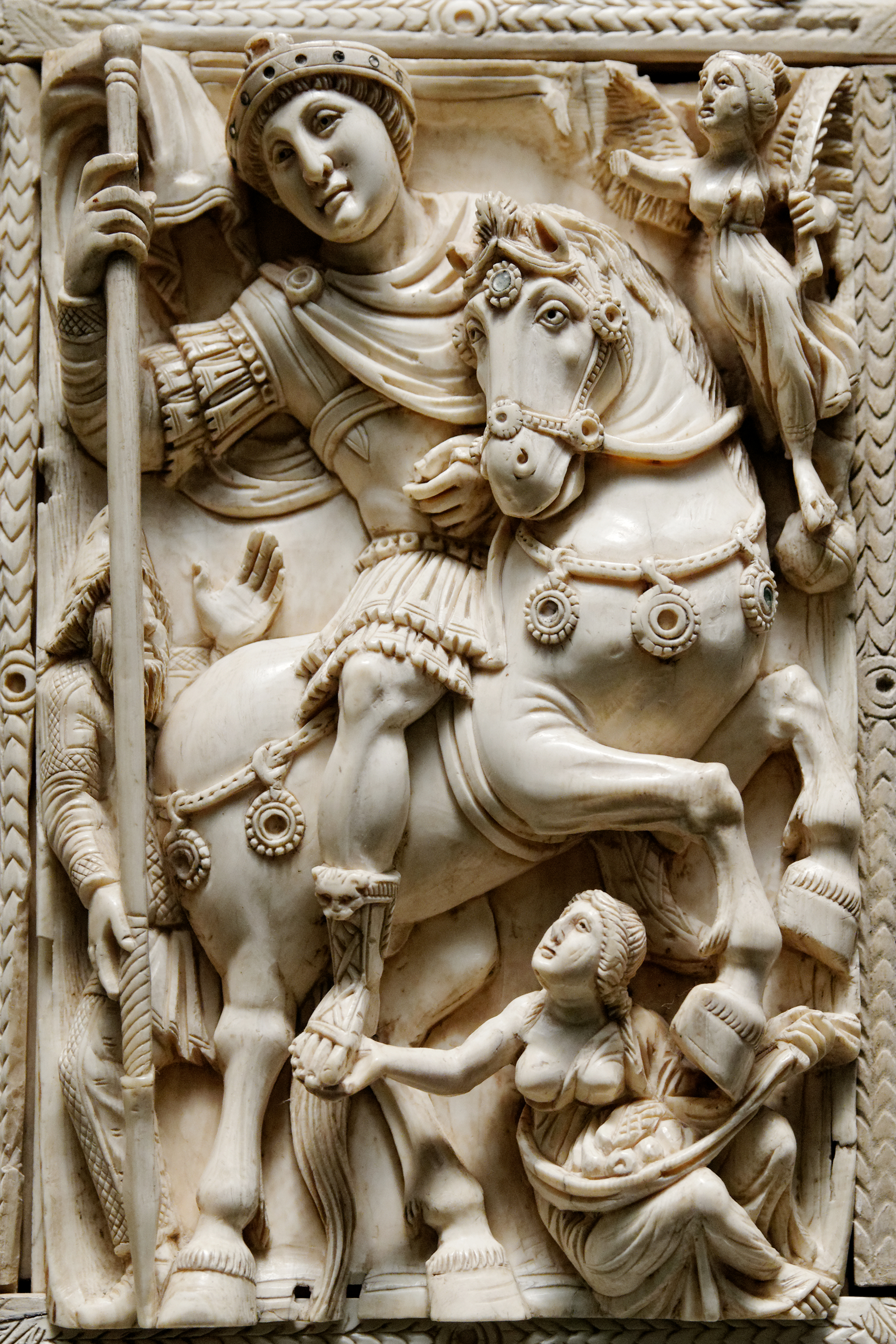
The triumphant emperor on the central panel

The composition is arranged around a central plaque which dominates it by its motif as much as by its stylistic quality. The sculpted motif is a triumphant figure of an emperor on a rearing horse. In his right hand the emperor holds the butt of a lance, the other end pointed towards the ground, and in his left he holds his horse's reins. Behind the lance is the figure of a barbarian, identified as such by his hair, his bushy beard and above all by his clothes - his curved cap (similar to a Phrygian cap), indicating an eastern origin, a long-sleeved tunic and baggy trousers. Symbolising a Persian or a Scythian, he may represent the peoples defeated by the emperor – as a sign of submission he touches the lance with his right hand and raises his left hand - or be "cheering", perhaps a member of an auxiliary unit. Ernst Kitzinger noted as "remarkable... the amount of lively activity with which the central relief is packed", in contrast to the static figures at the centre of most diptychs. In his interpretation "The emperor has arrived on his charger this instant, his mantle still flying in the wind. It almost appears as though he had just passed through a low city gate which had caused him to tilt his head. He pulls in his reins and makes a rapid half-turn as he rams his spear into the ground to use it as a support in dismounting. ... In all Roman art there is no more spirited portrayal of an imperial adventus."

In the lower right corner, under the horse, a woman lies on the ground. Her robe has slipped, revealing her right breast, and in her left hand she holds a fold of her robe containing fruits, symbols of prosperity. Her right hand is raised to the emperor's right foot in a gesture of submission. She personifies Earth, representing the emperor's universal domination and with the fruits symbolising the prosperity of his reign. This personification was often presented in this role on images of the triumphant emperor or the emperor in majesty, as for example on the missorium of Theodosius (with Tellus similarly represented at the bottom of the composition, under the figure of Theodosius I enthroned in majesty) and on the relief of the pietas augustorum on the arch of Galerius (where the Tetrarchs are accompanied by a series of personifications, including Gaia) These personifications of Tellus/Gaia are generally recognisable by their principal attribute of a cornucopia – this is not actually present on the ivory, but the fruit-filled fold in the woman's robe is of the same form and fulfils the same symbolic function.

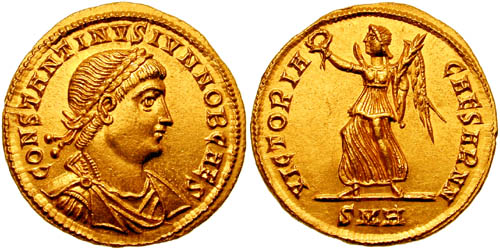
Solidus of Constantine II, minted in Heraclea between 326 and 330.

Counterbalancing this first female figure, in the top right hand corner of the central panel, is a statuette of a winged Victory standing over a globe inscribed with the sign of the cross, holding a palm (symbol of victory) in her left hand and in her right hand (now broken) she almost certainly held a crown to be placed on the emperor's head. This type of statuette personification is also one of the links to the iconography of the triumphant emperor, found on several coins (e.g. the reverse of the solidus of Constantine II, right) but also in sculpture (e.g. the scene of sacrifice on the arch of Galerius) and on some consular diptychs.

The emperor has a bowl or archivolt haircut, of the sort where the fringe describes an arched circle around his face, similar to that worn by Constantine, and wears a crown studded with pearls, of which four survive. His facial features are oval in form and quite heavy, notably the eyelids and the nose, but give a cheerful character to the imperial portrait. The emperor wears the military uniform of commander in chief, the role in which he is portrayed – under his cuirass he wears a short tunic and over the cuirass a cloak (paludamentum), of which a fold flies behind him and which is held onto his shoulder by a round fibula. The fibula was originally made of precious stone, like the cuirass. He wears cross-laced boots (cothurni), ornamented with a lion's head. The horse's harness is decorated with a series of medallions dripping in inlays, now lost apart from the one in the centre of its head.

The relief of this central motif was particularly accentuated – the Victory, the lance, and to a lesser extent the heads of the emperor and of his horse are all sculpted very nearly in the round. The care taken in modelling the drapery and in the rendering of certain anatomical details, such as the muscles of the emperor's arm, may qualify it as classicising. These characteristics, added to the disproportionate scale of the figures, underline the majesty of the imperial person, recalling Theodosian art.

=== Side panels ===
The side panels are in less-elevated relief (the maximum depth of the carving on the central panel is 28 mm, whereas it is only 9 mm on the side panels), and are stylistically slightly less virtuosic than the central panel. They bear borders inscribed in a simplified zig-zag pattern, leaving room in the border around the central panel for a garland of stylised leaves with a small round hole on the middle of each side for four now-lost inlays.

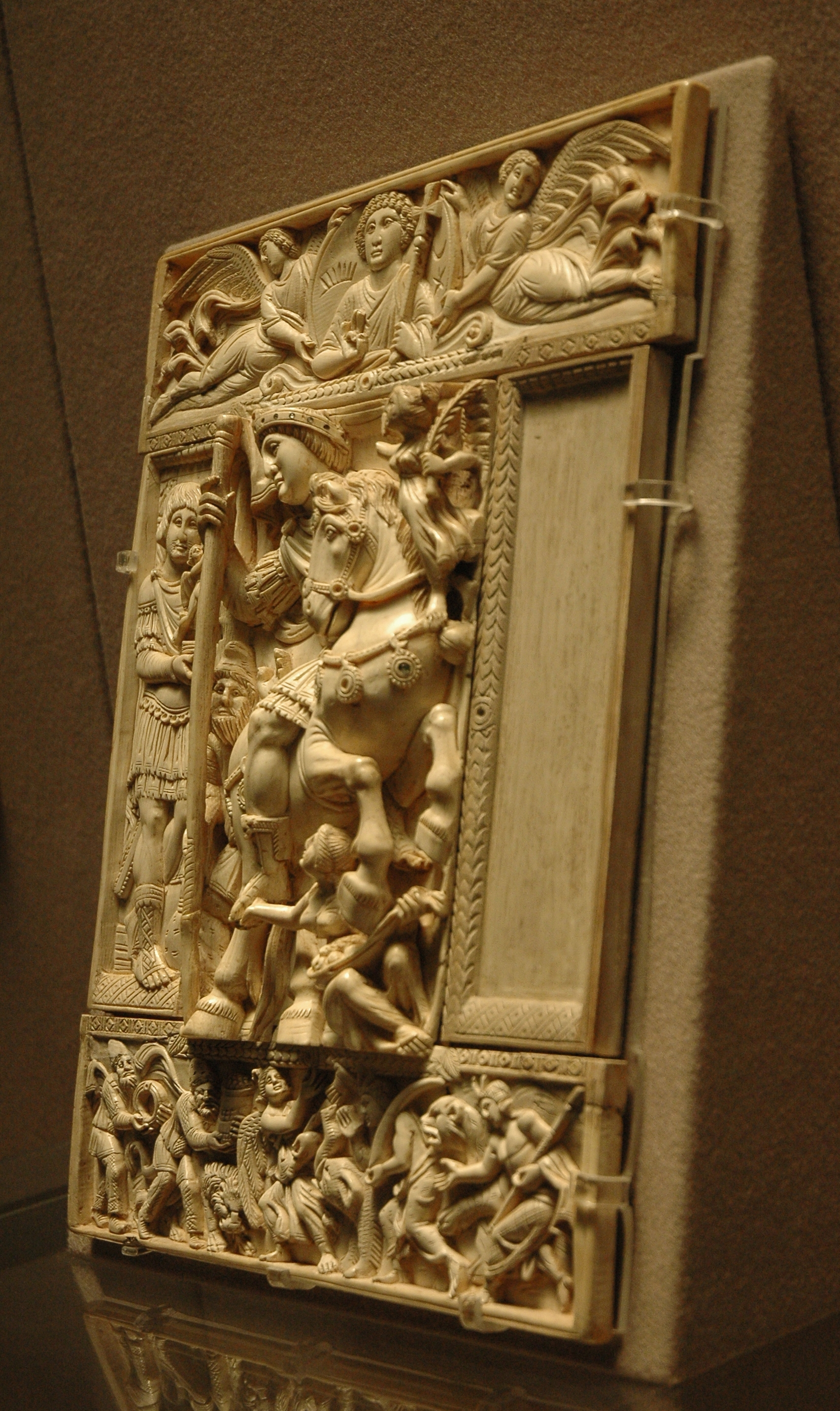
3/4 view, underlining the different depths of relief on the Barberini ivory.

The left hand panel represents a superior officer, recognisably by his military clothing and equipment, comparable to those of the emperor. Bearded, he wears a cuirass and the paludamentum, fixed to his right shoulder by a simpler fibula than that worn by the emperor. We can distinguish the scabbard of his sword fixed to his belt, worn on the left side. He advances towards the emperor and presents him with a statuette of Victory on a pedestal - she hold a crown and a palm, like the Victory on the central panel. At his feet is a bag. The man stands in an architectural scheme formed of two columns supporting Corinthian capitals and of a tessellated pattern (possibly opus sectile) evoking a room in an imperial palace.

This figure is sometimes interpreted as a consul, and the statuette of Victory and the bag (interpreted as in all probability containing gold) as consular attributes. However, the figure may also represent sparsio, the consular largesses represented on other diptychs, such as those of Clement (513) and Justin (540), with the bag of gold more broadly symbolic of war booty, proof of imperial triumph. Equally, where Caesar Gallus holds a comparable statuette of victory in his image on the Calendar of 354, he wears civil and not military clothing. The officer on the Barberini ivory is thus more likely to represent a general who took part in the victorious campaign represented by the ivory. It is natural to suppose that in the symmetrical panel on the right (now missing) showed another general in similar fashion. There is also the possibility that this figure represents the Frankish king Clovis I, who possibly received the diptych in 508.

=== Bottom panel ===
The bottom panel forms a sort of frieze decorated by a double procession of barbarians and animals converging on a central figure of Victory. She is turned to look upwards towards the figure of the emperor on the central panel and holds in her right hand a military trophy, represented in the traditional form of a branch with military arms, armour and booty fixed to it. The defeated barbarians carry to the emperor various gifts as tribute and are differentiated by their clothes and by the wild animals who accompany them. To the left, two bearded figures are of the same type as the barbarian in the central panel, wearing short tunics, Phrygian caps and closed boots. One of them wears a crown, the other a cylindrical container with unknown contents, perhaps gold, and ahead of them walks a lion. They may be Persians or Scythians

To the right, the two barbarians are dressed very differently - nude from the waist up, they wear a fabric headdress heightened by feathers, a simple piece of fabric tied at the waist and sandals. They are accompanied by a tiger and a small elephant. The first bears an elephant's tusk on his shoulder and the second a baton of unknown function. These represent Indians.

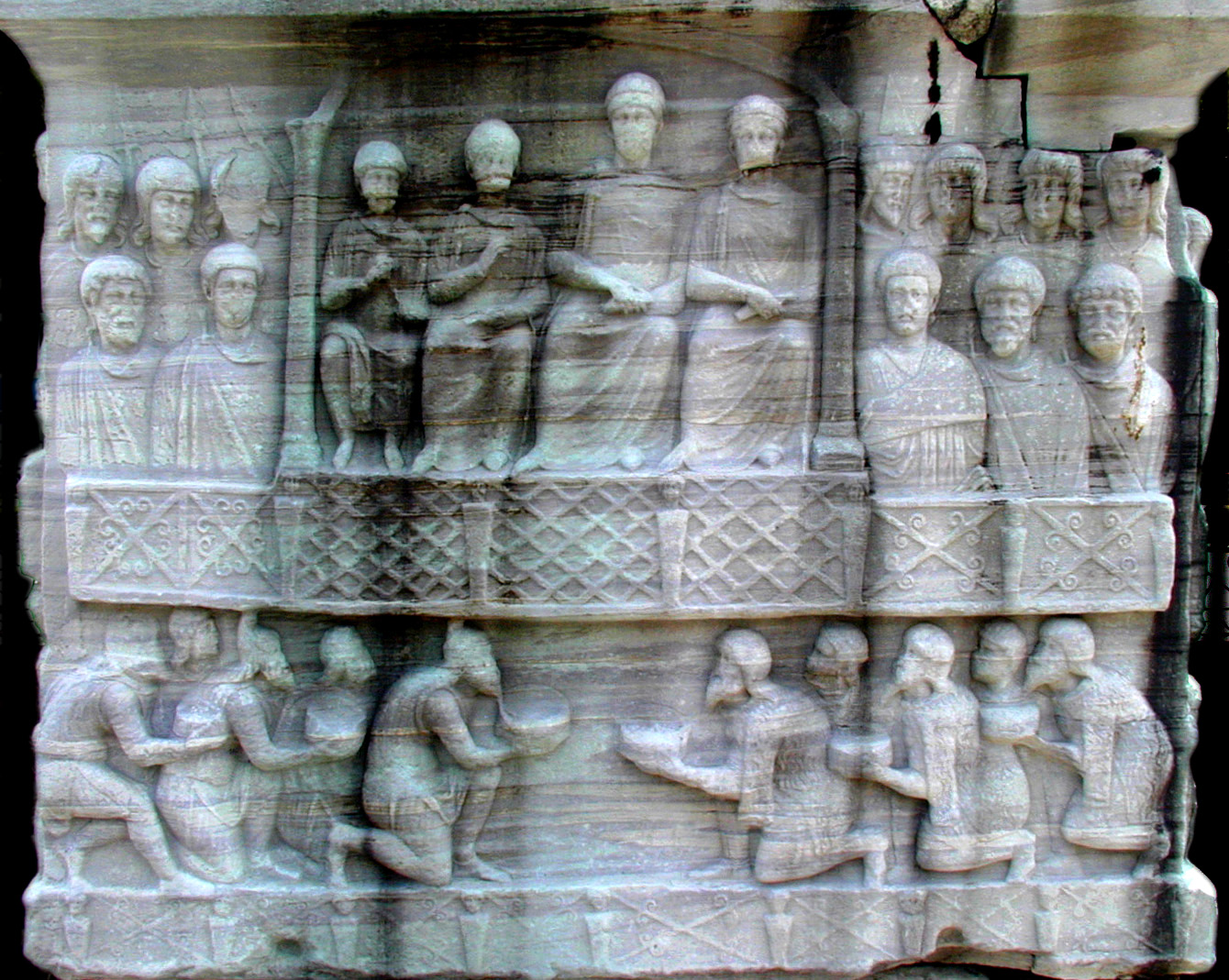
Northwest face of the base of the obelisk of Theodosius, showing barbarians rendering tribute to the emperor.

This motif of barbarians rendering homage to the emperor is common in Roman and Byzantine bas-reliefs – here, it is the aurum coronarium, the presenting of tribute. They show the emperor's clementia and underline the symbolism of imperial victory. One of two ivory fragments attributed to an imperial diptych now in Milan also represent this motif, in a slightly earlier work. It can also be found in Constantinople, for example on the base of the column of Arcadius (in a composition comparable to that on the Barberini ivory) or on the obelisk of Theodosius in the hippodrome (shown left). On the obelisk of Theodosius ten barbarians, again divided into two groups, converge on the central figure of the emperor, in this example enthroned in majesty in an imperial box surrounded by other augusti. On the left are Persians, and on the right are indeterminate western barbarians, perhaps Germans or Goths. Victory is absent on this relief, but she is well represented on the lost base of the column of Arcadius and on the lost base traditionally attributed to the column of Constantine – in both cases Victory is in a central position, as a sort of intermediary between the defeated barbarians and the figure of the emperor, situated below.

=== Upper panel ===
The upper panel of the ivory is occupied by two angels bearing an imago clipeata, a large medallion bearing a bust of a young and beardless Christ, holding a cruciform sceptre in his left hand and making a traditional sign of benediction with his right (the ring-finger held over the thumb). The bust is framed by symbols of the sun to the left and of the moon and a star to the right. The pair of angels bearing an image of Christ here replaces the earlier image of two winged Victories bearing a personification of Constantinople to be found on the second panel of the previously mentioned imperial diptych at Milan – the substitution is far from insignificant and implies a paradigm shift vital to the dating and understanding of the Barberini ivory. Kitzinger notes that the angel on the left echoes the emperor's turned head, and says "Christ makes his appearance in heaven at the moment in which the emperor stages his triumphal adventus on earth. It is a graphic depiction of the harmony between heavenly and earthly rule."

== Identification of the emperor ==
The question of the identity of the emperor represented on the central panel is the central problem to have occupied commentators on the Barberini ivory – its first modern owner, Peiresc, recognised him without hesitation as Heraclius and identified the officer offering the statuette of Victory as his son Constantine III. Later identifications of the central figure have also included Constantine I, Constantius II, Zeno and above all Anastasius I or Justinian. The identification is complicated by the fact that the emperor shown is not necessarily the reigning emperor at the date when the ivory was produced. Thus the dating of the ivory is undeniably a useful indication in identifying the emperor but it is not conclusive in that regard.

=== Anastasius ===
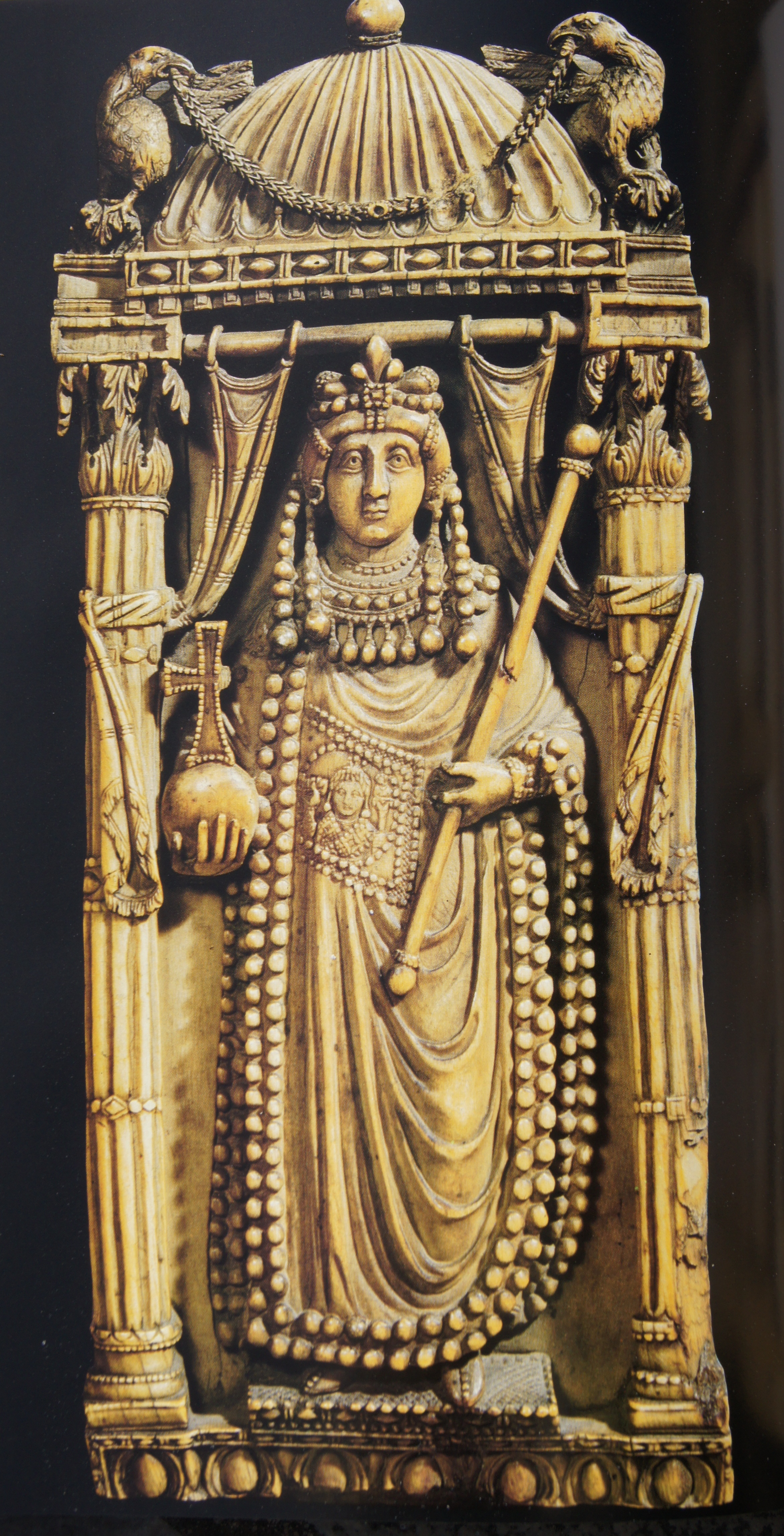
Panel of an imperial diptych representing empress Ariadne, Bargello.

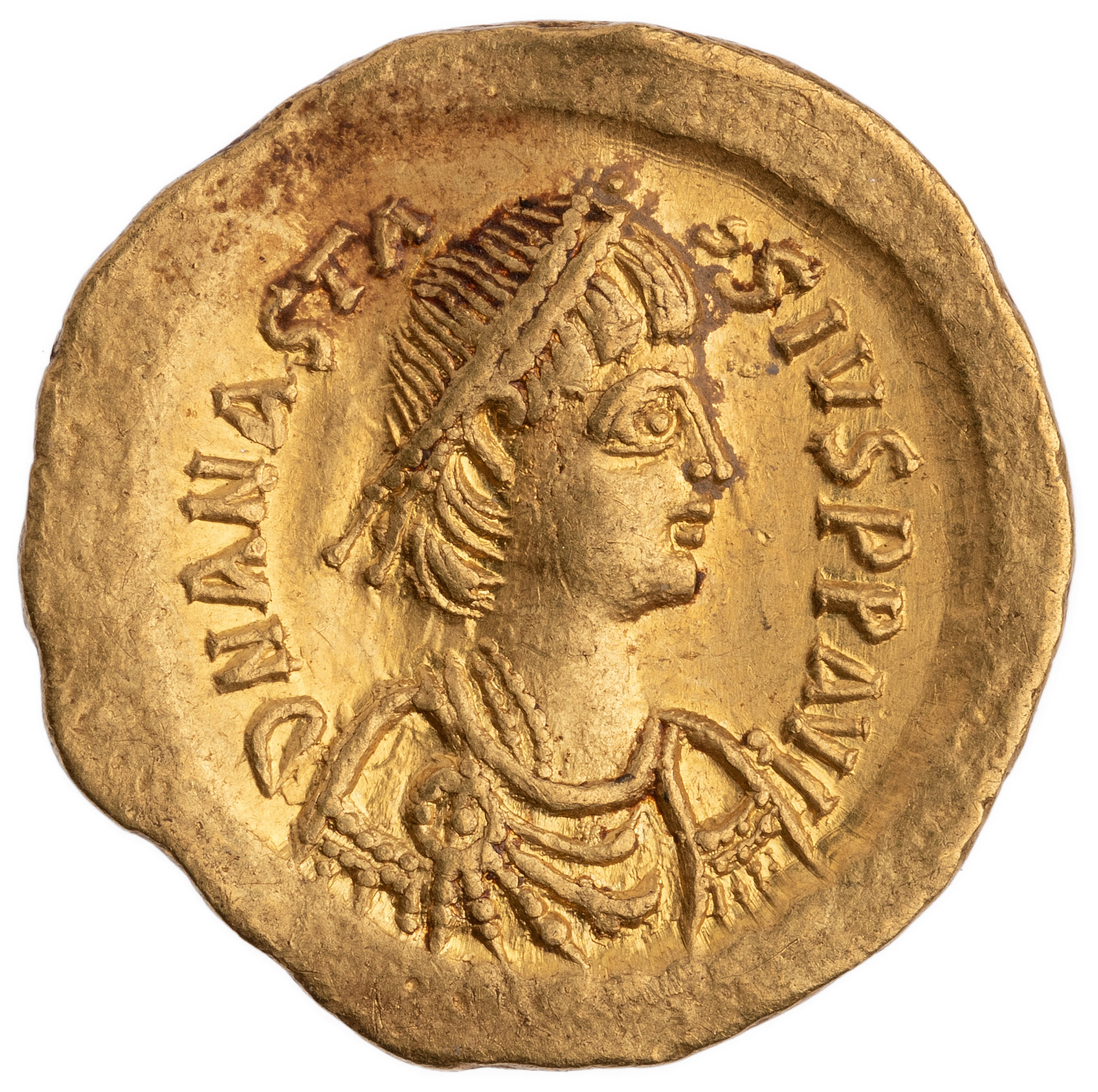
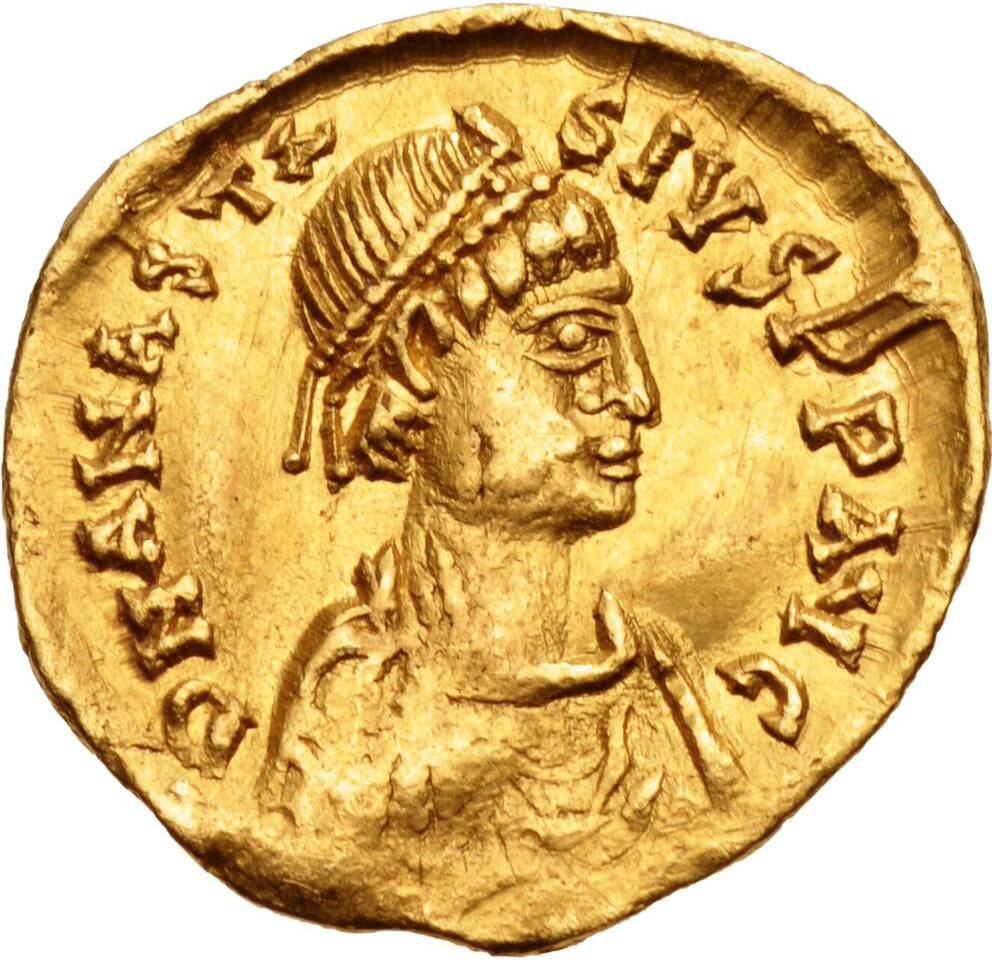
Semissis of Anastasius I.

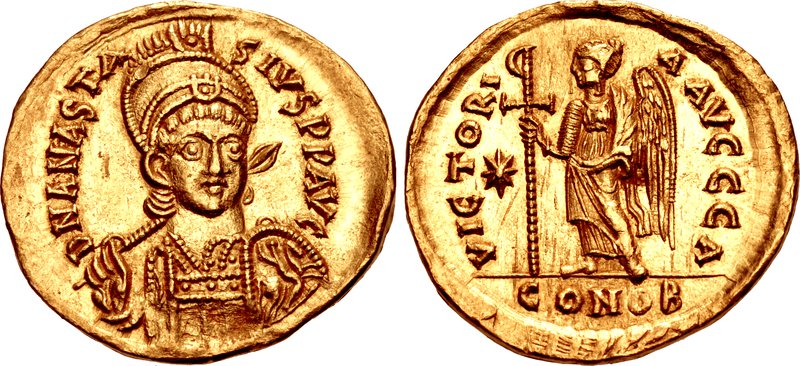
Solidus of Anastasius I.

From a stylistic point of view, the high-relief sculpture of the central panel is comparable to two other ivory panels dating to the start of the 6th century, each representing an empress – one is at the Bargello in Florence (left), the other at the Kunsthistorisches Museum in Vienna. They show the empress Ariadne (?-518), wife of the emperor Zeno (430–491) and then of Anastasius I (491–518). This parallel could suggest identifying the emperor on the Barberini ivory with Anastasius.

Anastasius's reign was marked by a difficult war against the Sassanid Persians from 502 to 505, ended by a peace in 506, which restored the status quo but which could be presented in Constantinople as a triumph after initial Roman setbacks. The production of the Barberini ivory can thus be envisaged in this context, making the triumph represented the one celebrated over the Persians.

Although the figure shares characteristics with certain consuls on diptychs contemporary with Anastasius I, such as that of Anastasius (517) and above all that of Magnus (518), the emperor's portrait on the Barberini ivory bears little resemblance with known portraits of Anastasius such as the medallion on the consular diptych of Anastasius. It is in fact closer to known portraits of Constantine, which has allowed certain historians to identify him with that emperor, including Barberini himself, as a contemporary catalogue entry for it shows (see above). This interpretation also owes something to the modern inscription on the right-hand replacement panel, in which it is easy to recognise the emperor's name, or at least so long as it does not refer to Constans or Constantius II instead.

On the other hand, stylistic criteria leave no doubt that the ivory is no earlier than the end of the 5th century, with the resemblance to the imperial portrait to portraits of Constantine explained by the commissioner's explicit will to recall the image of that emperor. From this perspective, this reference back to the iconography of Constantine fits Justinian better than it does Anastasius I.

=== Justinian ===
The lower-relief style of the secondary panels, and notably the purely graphic and unplastic rendering of clothing, accommodates a later dating of the work to around the middle of the 6th century. The work's combination of high-quality reliefs evokes another famous work of ivory sculpture of this era, the Throne of Maximian at Ravenna, datable to 545–556, and another product of a top-quality workshop, perhaps even the same one, in either Constantinople or Alexandria – this would make the triumphant emperor Justinian.

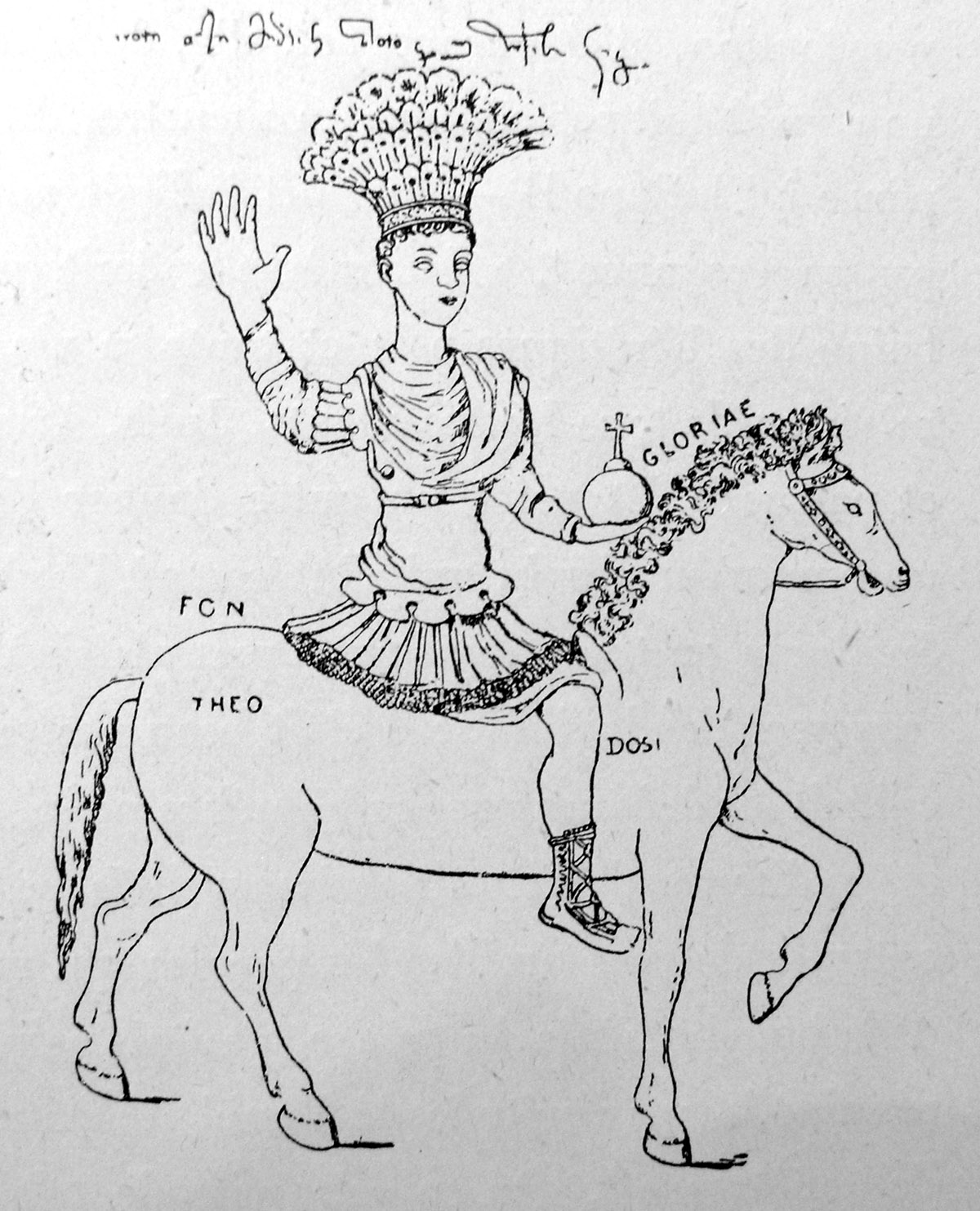
Drawing of the equestrian statue of Justinian in the Augustaion by Nymphirios.

The prepossessing position given in the composition to the figure of Christ blessing the emperor also suggests a Justinian date – it is comparable to a consular diptych of Justin from 540, the last known consular diptych before Justinian suppressed the consulship in 541, and the first to place images of Christ and of the imperial couple (Justinian and Theodora) in medallions below the portrait of the consul. Up until then the Christian presence on these diptychs had been limited to the symbol of the cross, like those framing the imperial portraits on the consular diptych of Clement in 513. This cross could also be shown within a crown carried by two angels, the best-known motif of the Theodosian era – besides ivories such as that at Murano, it also figures on the bas-reliefs of the column of Arcadius and the decoration of the sarcophagus of Sarigüzel. Replacing the cross within the crown with a bust of Christ on the Barberini ivory marks another step in the Christianisation of the relief form, which would also date it to later than the reign of Anastasius and corresponds well to the ideological orientation observed at the start of Justinian's reign. The Archangel ivory in London, of which only one panel survives, represents an archangel holding a sceptre and a globe topped by a cross and can be assigned to the same ideological movement. It was dated precisely to the start of Justinian's reign in 527 by D.H. Wright, after making a new translation of its Greek inscription.

The identification of the triumphant emperor with Justinian thus corresponds quite well to the imagery left behind by this emperor, which also includes equestrian statues and statues of Victory (for victories over the Persians that were heavily proclaimed in propaganda but not particularly real). A drawing by Nymphirios (a member of the entourage of Cyriac of Ancona) now in the library of the University of Budapest shows the statue which surmounted the column raised by Justinian in 543/4 in the Augustaion in Constantinople and described at length by Procopius of Caesarea in his Edifices (I, 2, 5). The emperor, mounted on a horse with one hoof raised, holds an orb surmounted by a cross in his left hand and greets the viewer with his right hand. He is crowned with a large plumed headdress or toupha. According to the epigram which was its dedicatory inscription, conserved in the Anthology of Planudes and confirmed by Procopius's account, the statue was set up so as to face east, towards the Persians, as a sign of the emperor threatening them. The connection of this statue with the triumphant emperor on the Barberini ivory is also justified in that the former was part of a sculptural group in the Augustaion which also included statues of three barbarian kings offering tribute to the emperor, as in the lower panel of the ivory.

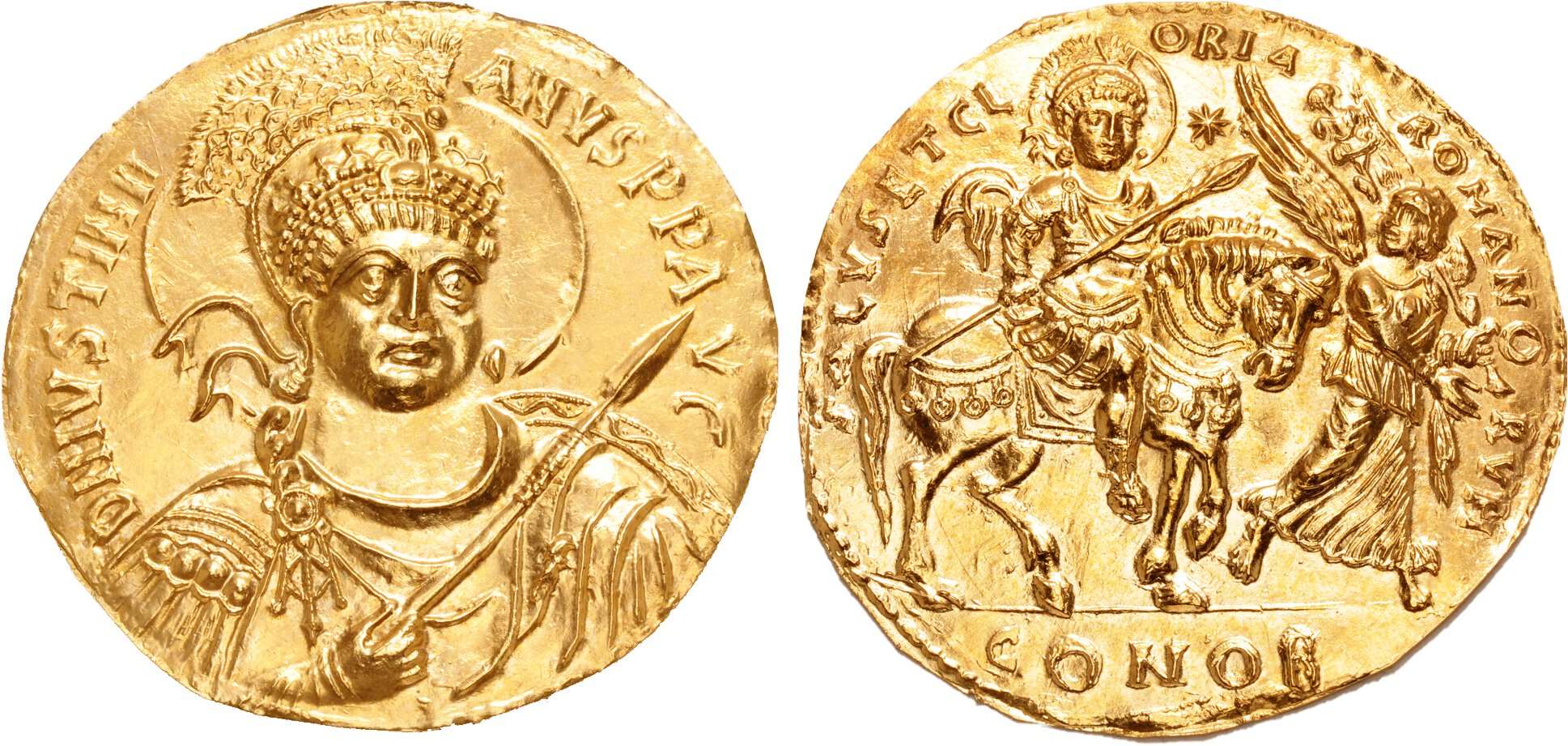
Gilt electrotype of a now-lost gold medallion of Justinian, representing a lost equestrian statue of the emperor, c.534.

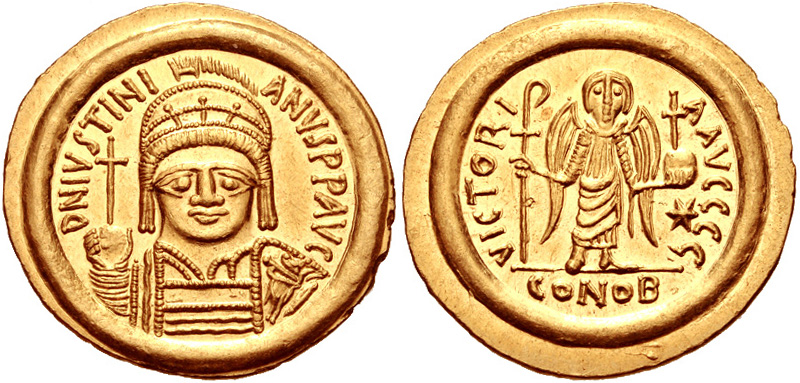
Solidus of Justinian showing a full-face imperial portrait

The drawing of the statue from the Augustaion may be linked to another equestrian representation of Justinian on one of his medals, left. The medal in question is a gold one weighing 36 solidi (164g), discovered in 1751 and now lost after being stolen from the Cabinet des Médailles (now part of the BNF) in 1831, although an electrotype of it survives. On the obverse is a nimbate bust of Justinian as a general, armed with a lance, wearing a cuirass and crowned with the diadem and toupha. The inscription reads Dominus Noster Iustiniianus Perpetuus Augustus (Our Lord Justinian, Perpetual Augustus). The reverse shows Justinian, again with a nimbus, riding a richly-dressed horse whose harness recalls that of the horse on the Barberini ivory. In front of him is a Victory holding a palm and a trophy under her left arm. A star is shown on the field, the exergue inscription gives the mark CONOB (indicating a mint in Constantinople) and the legend reads Salus et Gloria Romanorum (Safety and Glory of the Romans). The portrayal of Justinian in three-quarters profile allows the medal to be dated to before 538, after which he was systematically only represented full-face (right). The particularly sumptuous celebrations at the triumph in 534 marking the reconquest of Carthage from the Vandals could have been the occasion marked by the minting of this exceptional medal.

Another equestrian statue, of which only the dedicatory inscription remains (again in the Anthology of Planudes), could be seen in the hippodrome of Constantinople. This time no drawing of the statue survives, but its location in the hippodrome (the main meeting place in Constantinople and thus the best place for exhibiting imperial propaganda images) leads us to think that it must have been one of the most famous equestrian statues of the emperor, and thus likely to be imitated in ivory and other media. The inscription certainly suggests a monumental composition which cannot fail to evoke the central motif of the Barberini ivory:

Behold, prince [and] exterminator of the Medes, the offerings brought to you by Eustathios, at the same time father and son of the Rome which you hold: a horse rearing over a Victory, a second Victory who crowns you and you yourself astride this horse, fast as the wind. Thus high has your power risen, O Justinian – and on the earth the champions of the Medes and Scythians will remain forever in chains.

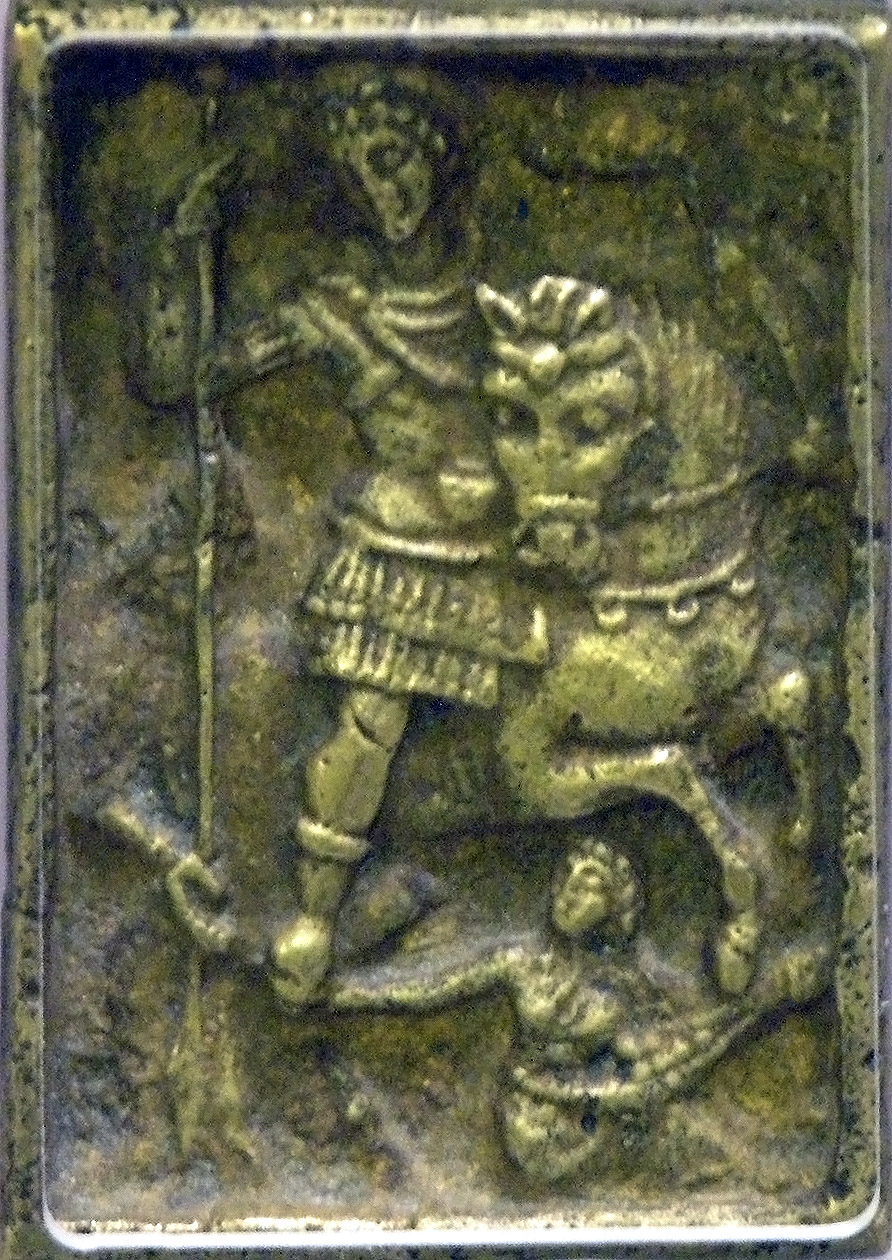
Bronze panel bearing an imitation of the central panel of the Barberini ivory (Byzantine and Christian Museum of Athens).

The existence of these equestrian statues of Justinian at Constantinople suggests that the central theme of the Barberini ivory reprises a lost type popularised by these statues, rather than that it created a new type. At least one other example of this type survives, on a bronze weight, now held at the Byzantine and Christian Museum of Athens (right). It bears an exact copy of the central motif of the Barberini ivory, with less detail and on a highly reduced scale. Rather than the bronze being directly modelled on the ivory, it is more probable that they both derived from a single model, perhaps a lost equestrian statue in the hippodrome. This does not cast doubt on the bronze, like the diptych, being the product of an imperial workshop and an official object. However, the bronze remains a more modest copy of the model, cheaper and thus perhaps meant for a wider circulation than the ivory.

The existence of this smaller copy confirms the popularity of this type of propaganda image under the rule of Justinian and also speaks of the emperor's zeal for making and spreading these images on very different media, from the monumental figurative sculptures in full three-dimensions to reliefs, bronze miniatures and ivory panels. Justinian's reign contained many wars that ended in victory, or more often wars that could be presented propagandistically as such, thus justifying the production of this type of object.

The pre-eminent position of a barbarian traditionally identified as a Persian as well as the type's parallels with the statuary group of the Augustaion invites the viewer to consider that the creation of this image type was occasioned by the “perpetual peace” concluded with Sassanid Persia in 532, although stylistic criteria suggest a later date.
