= Archiepiscopal Museum, Ravenna =

Museum in Ravenna, Italy

Coordinates: 44°24′56″N 12°11′51.9″E

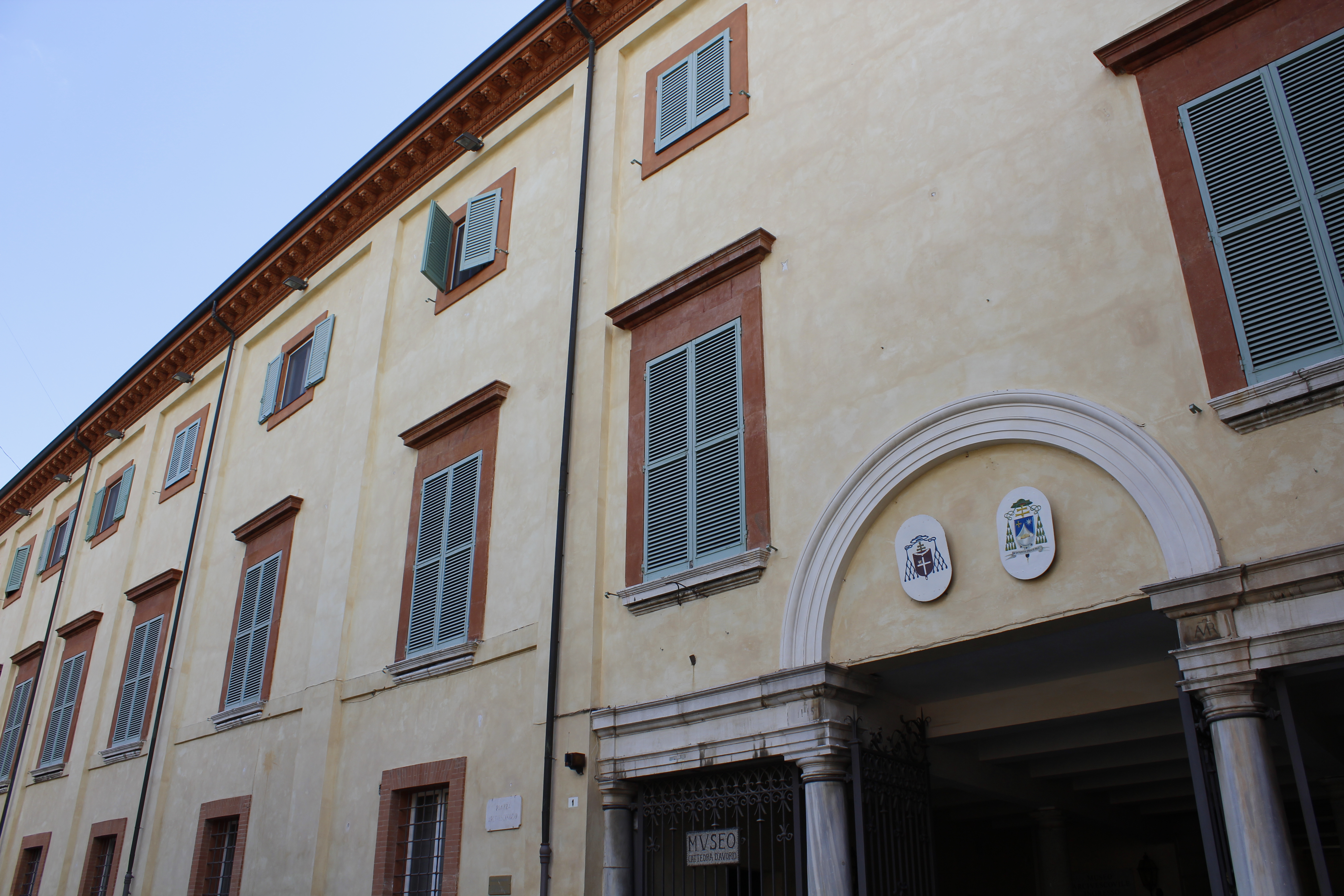
Facade of the Archiepiscopal Museum, Ravenna

The Archiepiscopal Museum (Italian: Museo Arcivescovile) is located in Ravenna, Italy, next to the Baptistry of Neon and behind the Duomo of Ravenna. In the museum relics of early Christian Ravenna are preserved, including fragments of mosaic from the first cathedral church, and the chapel of Sant'Andrea, dating from the Gothic kingdom.

The main room, on entering, contains lapidary inscriptions as HIC REQUIESCIT IN PACE VIR SBL SEDA IGNUCUS ('Here lies in peace that eminent man Seda the Eunuch'), CUBICULARIUS or 'Bedchamberlain' to Theodoric the Great, buried 541 AD. Beneath this, by the window, a reliquary for the martyred saints Quiricus and Julietta, whose remains were carried from Tarsus, the birthplace of Saint Paul, to Auxerre and from thence to Ravenna. The depictions on its four facings are in keeping with the theme of donation: Galla Placidia placed it in the church of San Giovanni Battista (not to be confused with the church of the 'Evangelista'). They are:

- Christ giving the Tables of the Law to St. Peter, with Paul standing by him;
- Daniel in the lions' den, with the prophet Habakkuk offering him a loaf and fishes;
- The Three Wise Kings bringing their gifts to the infant Christ;
- The women sitting below at His empty tomb.

The marble rosette on the facing wall is a Paschal calendar of the 6th century. Its purpose was to fix the movable feast of Easter in such a way that it might be celebrated everywhere in Christendom on the same day - no easy matter when East and West were using different calendars: the Eastern Church used the Hebrew lunar calendar, while the Western church followed the sun's cycle. Despite the decrees of the Council of Nicea in 325 AD and the tables of Theophilus, in this, as in all matters of faith, people followed their own loyalties. This calendar follows the eastern lunar cycle: LV on the outer rim, followed by AN indicates the phase of its 19-year cycle; the date then for Easter is written in each recurring phase from 532 AD to 626 AD.

The mosaics are the few fragments left of what covered the apse of the first church: they are not Roman originals but of the early 12th century. The most beautiful and intact is that of the Madonna, praying in the eastern manner; other fragments give some idea of its composition - the life of Sant'Apollinare, the patron saint and evangeliser of Ravenna; scenes of the Resurrection; Saints Peter and Paul. On entering the room to the right, there is a little stele depicting Christ the Good Shepherd by a tree: it is the tombstone of Antiphon, who died aged 17 years, 5 months and 12 days, sometime at the end of the 2nd/beginning of the 3rd century, long before the Edict of Tolerance, and is thus the earliest Christian record in Ravenna. The red porphyrian man (drawing or sheathing his sword?), headless, handless, footless, may be the Emperor Theodosius. It recalls the statue of the Tetrarchs outside the Doge's Palace in Venice, gripping onto power.

The jewel of the collection is the Ivory Cathedra, the bishop's seat of the Byzantine era (6th century), considered among the finest pieces of ivory carving in Western art. It is placed in what was the tower of Porta Salustra, the Roman gateway which commanded the southern entrance along the Cardis. It is the work of different hands and, even allowing for the missing panels, it still remains a visible masterpiece: the front bench, with the figures of Saint John the Baptist flanked by the Evangelists and a frieze work of peacocks, lions, goats and deer among vines, is especially fascinating; the backrest represents scenes from the birth of Christ, including Mary proving her virginity by immersion; on the other side, the miracles of Christ, his baptism and entry into Jerusalem; the armrests depict the Old Testament life of Joseph, reading from left to right (for the sitter).

== Chapel of Sant'Andrea ==
The museum houses the private chapel of the bishop, built in the time of Theodoric (end of the 5th century) and dedicated to Sant'Andrea (Saint Andrew). A central feature is the little contemplation of the Word, encapsulated in the initials of Christ, and which reaffirms the Orthodox creed reigning, when the Arians had supremacy in Ravenna: The vault of the narthex, as you enter, is an exquisite working of blues and greens in which all the aquatic birdlife of Ravenna is interlaced; the lower parts have been restored cleverly with painted 'mosaic', including the inscription: Aut lux hic nata est, aut capta hic libera regnat ("Either light was born here or it was captured, [either way, here it] reigns freely") - which, apart from being a very fine appreciation of the art of mosaic, might be a cunning allusion to the 'Babylonian Captivity' of the Light, ('begotten not made') in the years of the Gothic occupation.

Above the door is a lunette decorated with a young warrior Christ - the proud Roman soldier and not the Man of Sorrows, shouldering his cross, displaying the book which says I am the Way, the Truth and the Life; the lion and the snake he treads under foot are taken as the forces of evil (here, Arianism) which he defeats. Unfortunately, the chapel itself was heavily repainted with Renaissance frescoes (by Luca Longhi, a local artist) and marbling to give the same intimate feeling as the narthex. The apse has a starry sky which may have been inspired by the oratory of Galla Placidia; the vaulting has four angels arching inward to sustain the symbol of Christ: the initials I X = IesusXristos; between them, the symbols of the Evangelists and, in the vault of apse, portraits of the first Apostles Ss. Peter and Paul, James and Philip, Andrew and Jacob, with Christ, intent upon the Word and its interpretation. Even more than in the Christology of Galla Placidia, the Son of God is seen in the vault of Heaven: the Logos of the Cosmos. Robbed of earthly dominion, under Theodoric, the bishops of Ravenna contemplated celestial glory.

The chapel is included in the series of monuments of Ravenna classed by UNESCO as a world heritage site.
