= Hetoimasia =

Christian symbol of the empty throne

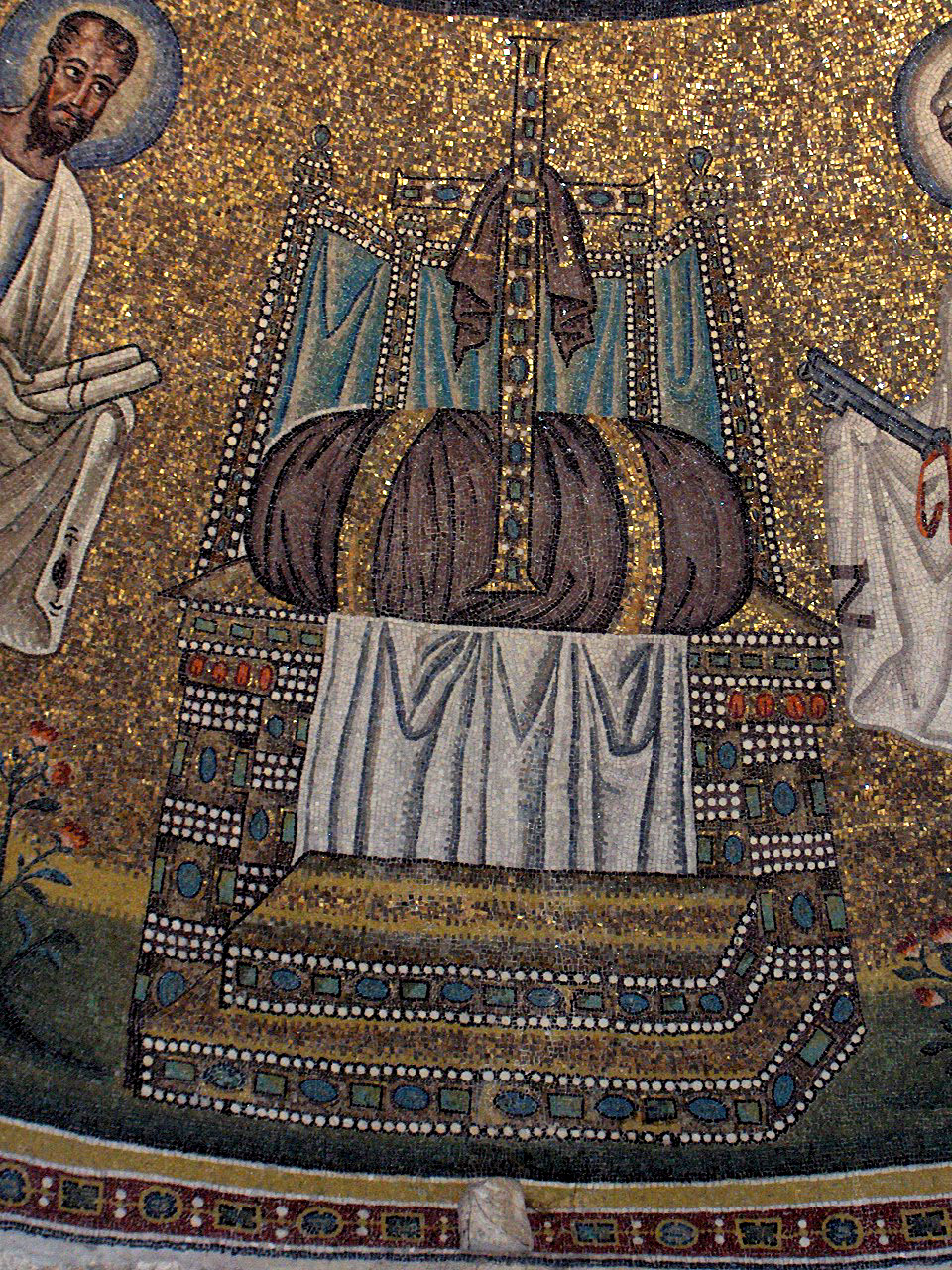
The empty throne with cushion, crux gemmata and cloth, flanked by Saints Peter and Paul. Arian Baptistery, Ravenna, early 6th century.

The Hetoimasia, Etimasia (Greek ἑτοιμασία, "preparation"), prepared throne, Preparation of the Throne, ready throne or Throne of the Second Coming is the Christian version of the symbolic subject of the empty throne found in the art of the ancient world, whose meaning has changed over the centuries. In Ancient Greece, it represented Zeus, chief of the gods, and in early Buddhist art it represented the Buddha. In Early Christian art and Early Medieval art, it is found in both the East and Western churches, and represents either Christ, or sometimes God the Father as part of the Trinity. In the Middle Byzantine period, from about 1000, it came to represent more specifically the throne prepared for the Second Coming of Christ, a meaning it has retained in Eastern Orthodox art to the present.

The motif consists of an empty throne and various other symbolic objects, in later depictions surrounded when space allows by angels paying homage. It is usually placed centrally in schemes of composition, very often in a roundel, but typically is not the largest element in a scheme of decoration.

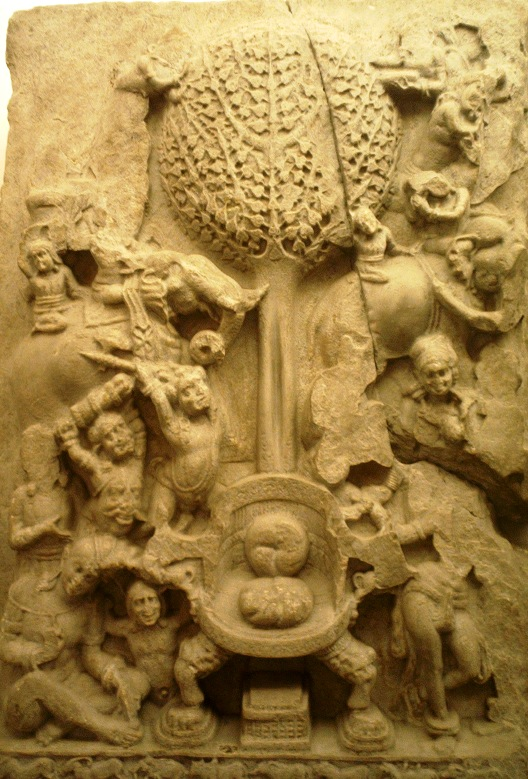
Buddhist 2nd century empty throne, attacked by Mara.

== The empty throne in pre-Christian art ==
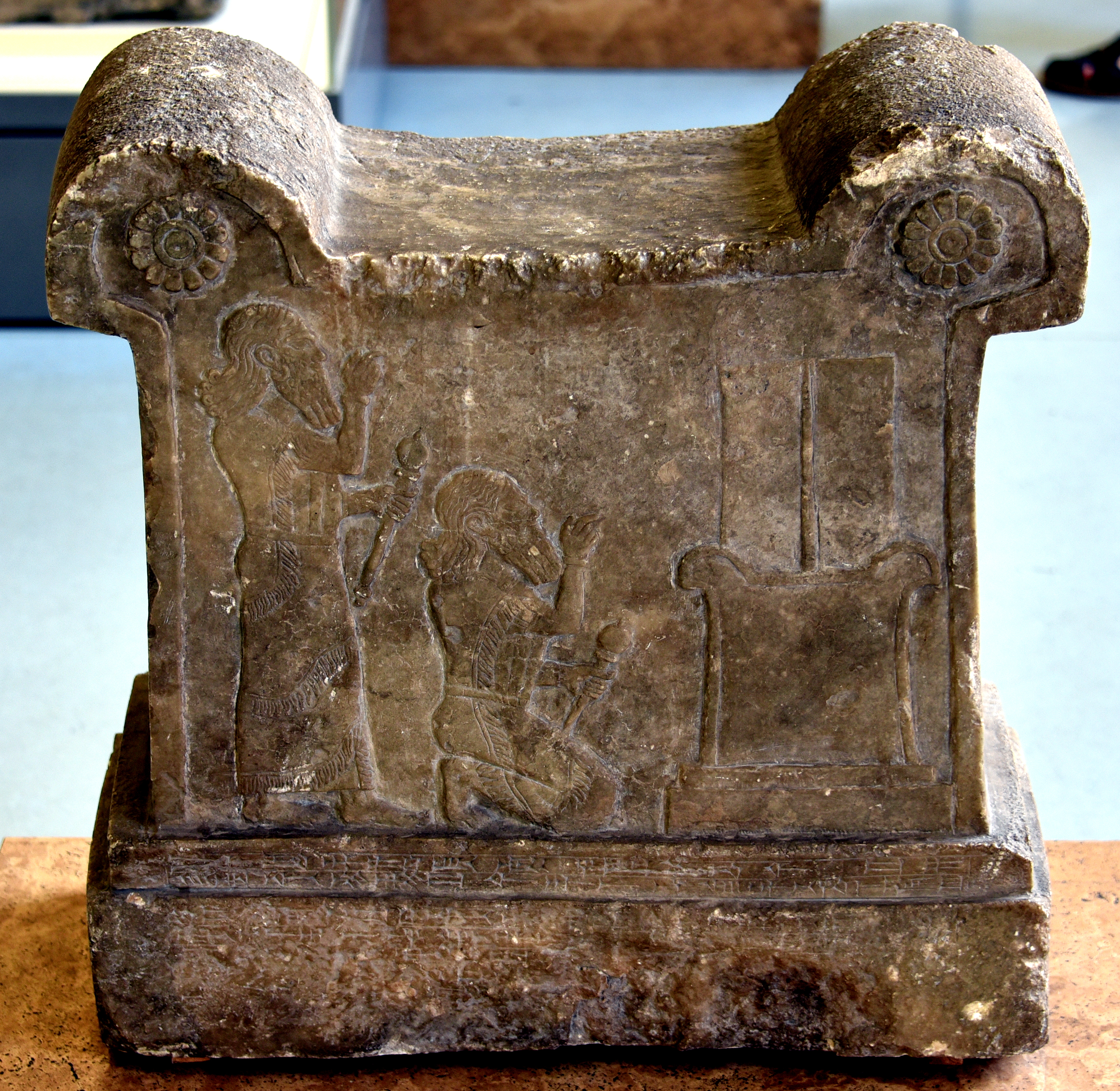
Symbolic base showing an empty throne, with a cuneiform inscription and depiction of Tukulti-Ninurta I 13th century BCE Assur, Iraq. Pergamon Museum, Berlin.

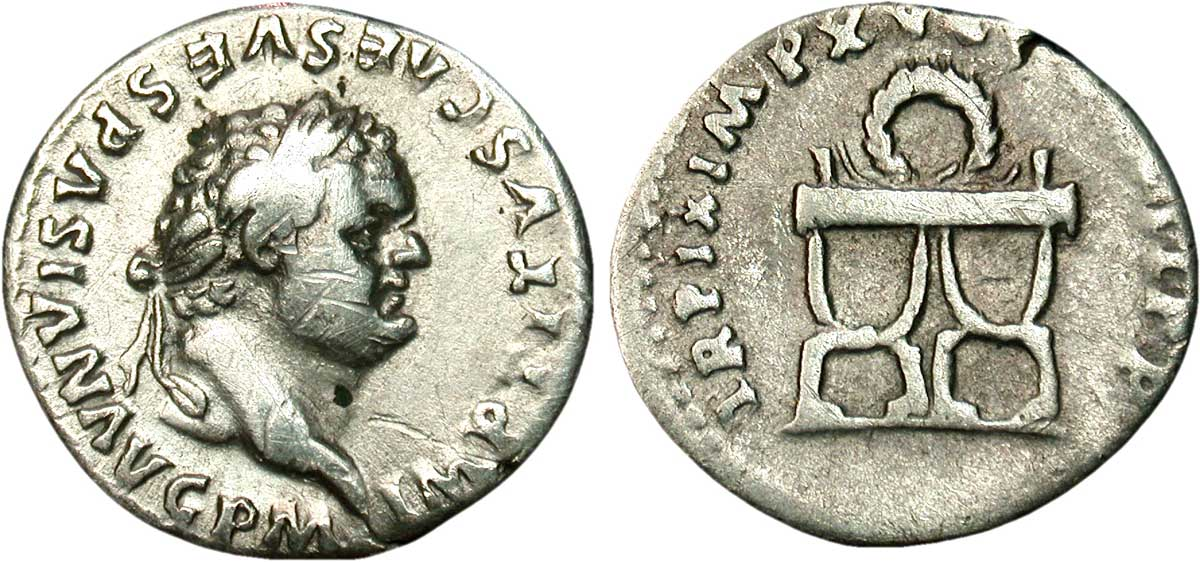
Roman Empire, 80 AD. Silver Denarius. On the obverse: Effigy of Emperor Titus; on the reverse: curule seat surmounted by a crown.

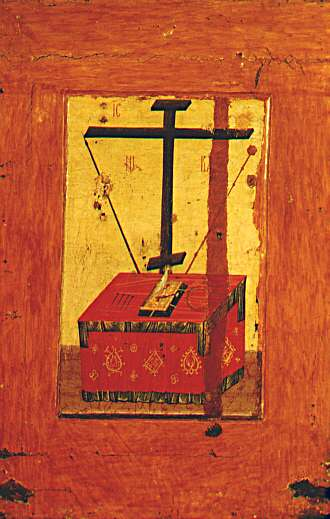
On the reverse of the Byzantine icon known as the Virgin of Vladimir, with instruments of the Passion.

The "empty throne" had a long pre-Christian history. An Assyrian relief in Berlin of c. 1243 BCE shows King Tukulti-Ninurta I kneeling before the empty throne of the fire-god Nusku, occupied by what appears to be a flame. The Hittites put thrones in important shrines for the spirit of the dead person to occupy, and the Etruscans left an empty seat at the head of the table at religious feasts for the god to join the company. A somewhat controversial theory, held by many specialists, sees the Israelite Ark of the Covenant, or the figures of the cherubim above it, as an empty throne. A throne with a crown upon it had been a symbol for an absent monarch in Ancient Greek culture since at least the time of Alexander the Great, whose deification allowed secular use for what had previously been a symbol for Zeus, where the attribute placed on the throne was a pair of zig-zag thunderbolts.

Early Buddhist art used an empty throne, often under a parasol or Bodhi Tree, from before the time of Christ. This was, in the traditional view, an aniconic symbol for the Buddha; they avoided depicting the Buddha in human form, like early Christians with God the Father. Alternatively, it has been argued that these images represent actual relic-thrones at the major pilgrimage sites which were objects of worship. The throne often contains a symbol such as the dharma wheel or Buddha footprint, as well as a cushion.

Like the Greeks and other ancient peoples, the Romans held ritual banquets for the gods (a ritualized "theoxenia"), including the annual Epulum Jovis, and the lectisternium, originally a rare event in times of crisis, first held in 399 BCE according to Livy, but later much more common. A seat for these was called a pulvinar, from pulvinus ("cushion"), and many temples held these; at the banquets statues of the deity were placed on them. There was a pulvinar at the Circus Maximus, on which initially statues and attributes of the gods were placed after a procession during games, but Augustus also occupied it himself (possibly copying Julius Caesar), building a temple-like structure in the seating to house it. Thrones with a jewelled wreath, portrait or sceptre and diadem sitting on them were among the symbols used in the Roman law courts and elsewhere to represent the authority of the absent emperor; this was one of the monarchical attributes awarded by the Roman Senate to Julius Caesar.

A seat with jewelled wreath is seen on coins from the Emperor Titus onwards, and on those of Diocletian a seat with a helmet on it represents Mars. Commodus chose to be represented by a seat with the club and lion skin of Hercules, with whom he identified himself. The empty throne continued to be used as a secular symbol of power by the first Christian Emperors, and appears on the Arch of Constantine.

Later non-Christian uses of the empty throne motif include the "Bema Feast", the most important annual feast of Persian Manichaeism, when a "bema" or empty throne represented the prophet Mani at a meal for worshippers. In the Balinese version of Hinduism, the most prominent element in most temples is the padmasana or "Lotus Throne", an empty throne for the supreme deity Acintya.

In the Ashanti Empire, the Golden Stool was used as a symbol of authority for the kings. It was considered so sacred that it was not allowed to touch the ground (but only placed on a blanket) or seated on its own throne.

== Christian art ==
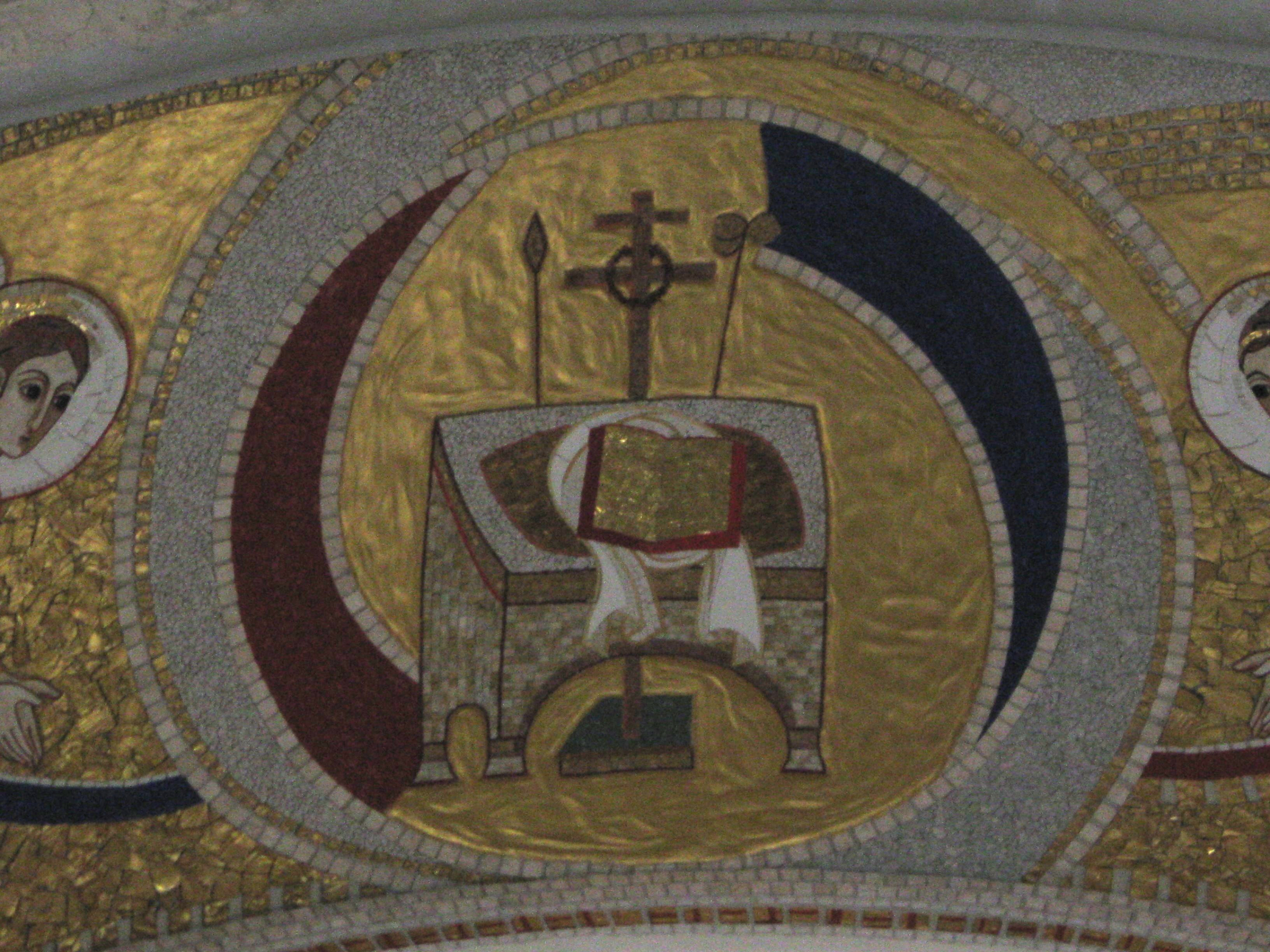
Modern depiction in a Romanian Orthodox church, with crown of thorns around the cross.

There are several elements found in the image which reflect its changing meaning. The throne itself is always present, and is often backless and armless. In Ancient Greek, a "thronos" was a specific but ordinary type of chair with a footstool, and there is very often a footstool in the image. There is often a prominent cushion, and a cloth variously interpreted as Christ's mantle (especially when of imperial purple) or a sudarium may cover or sit on the throne. There may be a crown on the throne. There is often a book, often on the cushion and sometimes open; this represents the gospels in some examples, and in others the Book of Life, always closed and distinguished by its seven seals, following the Book of Apocalypse. There is nearly always a cross (except in images of councils), often a crux gemmata, and in later examples a patriarchal cross with two crossbars. The cloth may be draped round the cross, as may the crown of thorns, which first appears as an isolated motif in this context. This seems to have originated as a victor's wreath around or over the cross, part of the early emphasis on "Christ as Victor" found in much cross imagery, but later to have been transmuted into the crown of thorns. It has also been suggested that the wreathed cross motif also was the origin of the Celtic cross.

The dove of the Holy Spirit may be present. In later versions two of the instruments of the Passion, the Spear and sponge on a stick, stand behind or beside the throne, or are held by angels. The nails from the cross and crown of thorns may sit on the throne, as in the Russian icon illustrated. If angels or archangels are included they are symmetrically placed on either side, either facing the throne or facing out and gesturing towards it; if there is a roundel they may be outside it. In earlier depictions other figures may surround the throne, for example Saints Peter and Paul in Santa Prassede, Rome (9th century). An alternative to the angels is kneeling figures of Adam and Eve in old age paying homage on either side of the throne. These are found in several large wall-paintings and mosaics, from the 12th century mosaics in Torcello Cathedral, the paintings in the Chora Church, and the painted church exterior at Voroneţ Monastery in Romania of 1547.

== Meaning of the image ==
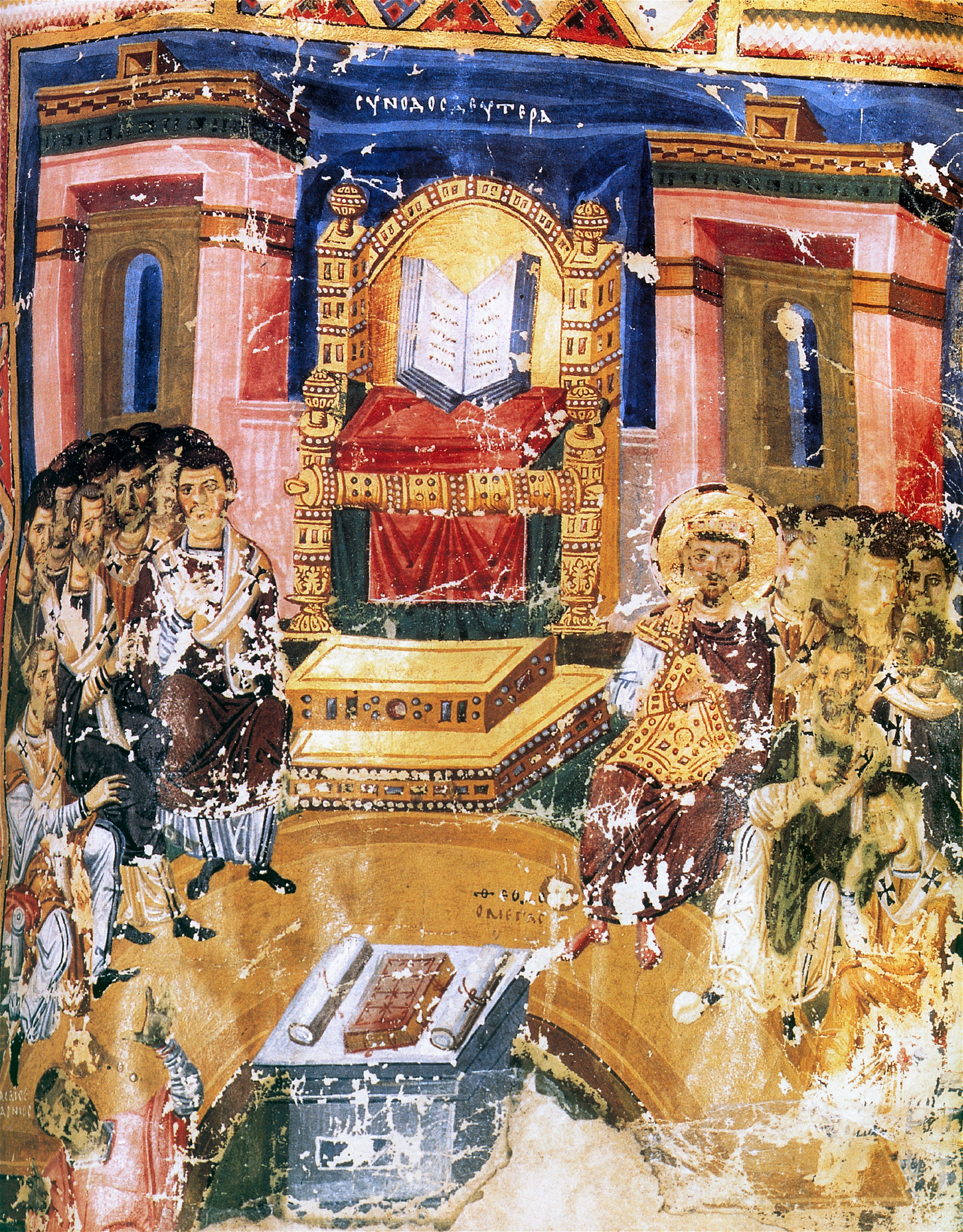
Byzantine miniature of about 880 of the First Council of Constantinople in 381

The image was one of many aspects of imperial iconography taken up by Early Christians after the Edict of Milan in 313, when the depiction of Jesus as a human figure, especially as a large figure detached from narrative contexts, was still a matter of controversy within Christianity. At the First Council of Nicaea in 325 an empty throne had the imperial insignia on it, representing the emperor Constantine I when he was not present. However within a few decades an empty throne with a book of the gospels on it was being placed in the chamber of church councils to represent Christ, as at the First Council of Ephesus in 431. It has been suggested that the ivory Throne of Maximian in Ravenna, probably a gift from the Eastern Emperor Justinian I, was not made as a throne for personal use by Maximian, who was both Archbishop of Ravenna and the viceroy of the Byzantine territories in North Italy, but as an empty throne to symbolize either the imperial or divine power; Byzantine imagery at this period was sometimes ready to conflate the two. A comparable symbol is the bishop's throne from which the cathedral takes its name, which, unless the bishop happens to be present and sitting in it, functions as a permanent reminder of his authority in his diocese.

In the earlier versions the throne is most often accompanied by a cross and a scroll or book, which at this stage represents the Gospels. In this form the whole image represents Christ, but when the dove of the Holy Spirit and the cross are seen, the throne appears to represent God the Father, and the whole image the Trinity, a subject that Christian art did not represent directly for several centuries, as showing the Father as a human figure was objectionable. An example of a Trinitarian hetoimasia is in the Church of the Dormition in Nicaea. From about 1000 the image may bear the title hetoimasia, literally "preparation", meaning "that which has been prepared" or "that which is made ready", and specifically refers to the "sign of the Son of Man" and the Last Judgement. By this time the image usually occurs in the West only under direct Byzantine influence, as in Venice and Torcello.

Some Early Christians had believed that the True Cross had miraculously ascended to Heaven, where it remained in readiness to become the glorified "sign of the Son of man" (see below) at the Last Judgement. The Discovery by Helena had displaced this view as to the fate of the actual cross, but the idea of the return at the Last Judgement of the glorified cross remained, as in a homily by Pope Leo the Great (d. 461), which was incorporated in the Roman Breviary.

== Early examples ==
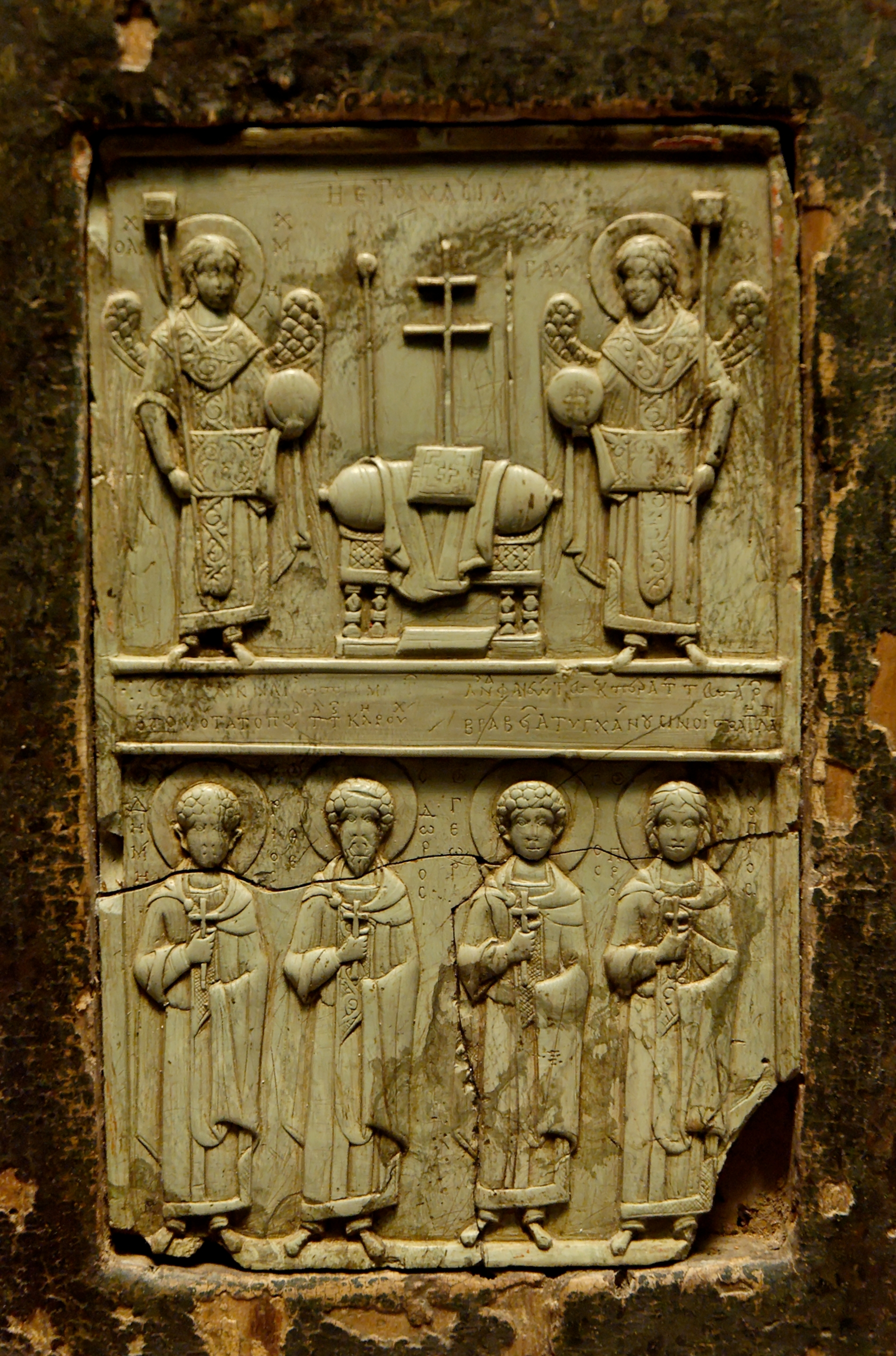
Icon in ivory, with archangels, cross, spear and sponge, and "Hetoimasia" inscribed above the throne, Constantinople around 1000

Although it is assumed that other examples existed earlier, the earliest surviving Christian hetoimasia is in the earliest major scheme of church decoration to survive, the mosaics in Santa Maria Maggiore, Rome (432-40), where it occupies the narrow centre of the "triumphal arch" separating nave and apse, flanked by angels, a typical placement. It is shown, with a procession of Apostles, on a panel of the Pola ivory casket from Istria. Three now displaced stone reliefs of the subject with other symbols are among the earliest indications of Christian architectural sculpture at this period; they are in Berlin, San Marco, Venice and Nicosia, Cyprus.

Elsewhere it may occupy the centre of a frieze below a larger composition in the apse semi-dome, or a position on the main axis of a circular frieze round a central scene in the roof of a dome, as in the Arian Baptistry (start of 6th century) in Ravenna. At Castelseprio it occupies the centre of the apse-side (west-facing) of the triumphal arch. All are central positions, prominent but not dominant. The Baptistry of Neon (late 5th century) in Ravenna is exceptional in using repeated hetoimasia images in a circular dome frieze of eight images, four each of two types appearing alternately: a hetoimasia with cross in a garden and an altar containing an open book, flanked by two chairs.

The 6th-century "throne-reliquary" in rather crudely carved alabaster, the Sedia di San Marco, was moved from the high altar to the Treasury of San Marco, Venice in 1534. It would only fit a bishop with a slight figure, and has a large compartment for relics below the seat. It may have functioned as a "throne-lectern" or resting place for a gospel book, making actual the hetoimasia images with open books.

== Later use ==
During the Middle Byzantine period the etimasia became a standard feature of the evolving subject of the Last Judgement, found from the 11th century onwards. As in the Western versions descended from the Byzantine images, this was on several tiers, with Christ in Judgement at the top, and in the East the etimasia almost always in the centre of the tier below, but occasionally above Christ. This basic layout has remained in use in Eastern Orthodoxy to the present day, and is found both on church walls and as a painted panel icon. The etimasia was normally omitted in Western versions, except in works under direct Byzantine influence, such as the early 12th century west wall of Torcello Cathedral.

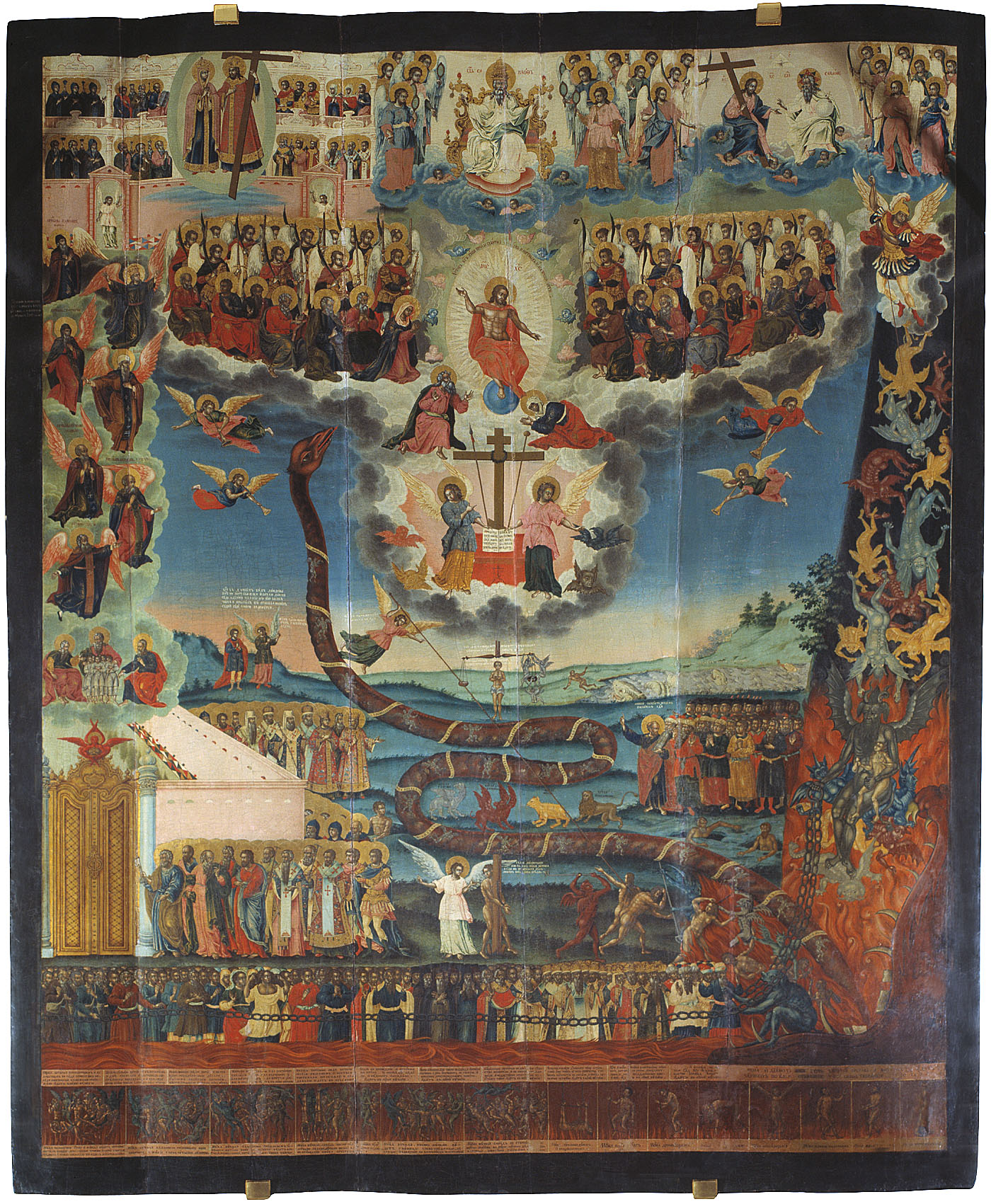
Russian 18th(?) century icon of the Last Judgement, following what had become a standard composition in its main elements, including the etimasia.

Another context in which the etimasia sometimes appears from the Middle Byzantine period is Pentecost, in Orthodoxy also the Feast of the Trinity. Here a trinitarian etimasia with the dove representing the Holy Spirit may be found, as in the 12th century mosaics on the roof of the west dome of St Mark's, Venice, where the centre is an etimasia with book and dove, with the twelve apostles seated round the outer rims, with flames on their heads and rays connecting them to the central throne. Below the apostles pairs of figures representing the "nations", with tituli, stand between the windows. Similar images are found in the Chludov Psalter and elsewhere. However, in this case the etimasia did not become part of a conventional composition, and it is not found in modern icons of the Pentecost.

It has been suggested that the empty stool with a cushion in the foreground of Jan van Eyck's Annunciation in Washington may suggest the empty throne; van Eyck characteristically uses domestic fittings to represent doctrinal references.

== Scriptural references ==
The image has been regarded as illustrating a number of different passages from the Bible. For the later Byzantines the etimasia was the "sign of the Son of man" of Matthew 24:30: "And then shall appear the sign of the Son of man in heaven: and then shall all the tribes of the earth mourn, and they shall see the Son of man coming in the clouds of heaven with power and great glory". The understanding of the image as a symbol for the Second Coming also drew on Psalms 9:7: "But the Lord shall endure for ever: he hath prepared his throne for judgment". where the Septuagint has "ἡτοίμασεν" ("hetoimasen") for "prepared". Psalm 89:14:"Justice and judgment are the habitation of thy throne: mercy and truth shall go before thy face" is another relevant passage, using the word in the Septuagint (instead of the "habitation" of the King James Version), giving "ἑτοιμασία τοῦ θρόνου" or "preparation of your throne". Throne imagery is found above all in the Book of Revelation, especially chapter 4, although the throne therein is already occupied.

== Terminology ==
The Greek verb ἑτοιμασεν ("hetoimasen") means "to prepare" or "to make ready". It will be seen that the name "hetoimasia", meaning "preparation" or "that which has been prepared", with "throne" ("thronos" in Greek) only implied, is more appropriate to the Eastern images after about 1000 than to those before. The use of the name for both groups was established in the 19th century by the French art historian Paul Durand (from 1867), and despite protests has stuck. In more modern Orthodox contexts "etimasia" and "prepared throne" are typically used, and in art history relating to the earlier group "hetoimasia" and "empty throne" - exclusively the latter in non-Christian contexts where a more specialized term is not used. There are various other transliterations and translations: "hetimasia", "throne made ready" etc.
