= Late Antique and medieval mosaics in Italy =

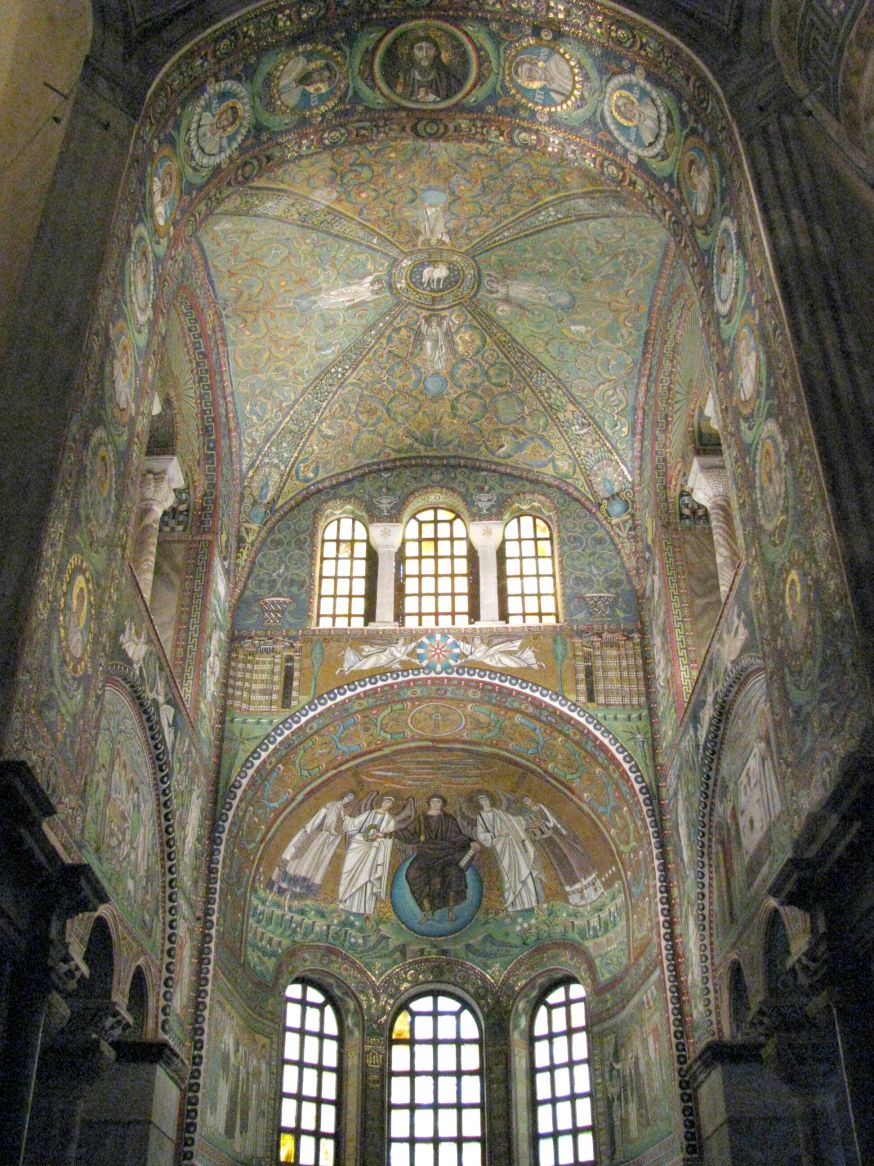
Basilica of San Vitale, Ravenna, 548

Italy has the richest concentration of Late Antique and medieval mosaics in the world. Although the art style is especially associated with Byzantine art and many Italian mosaics were probably made by imported Greek-speaking artists and craftsmen, there are surprisingly few significant mosaics remaining in the core Byzantine territories. This is especially true before the Byzantine Iconoclasm of the 8th century.

== Late Antique mosaics ==
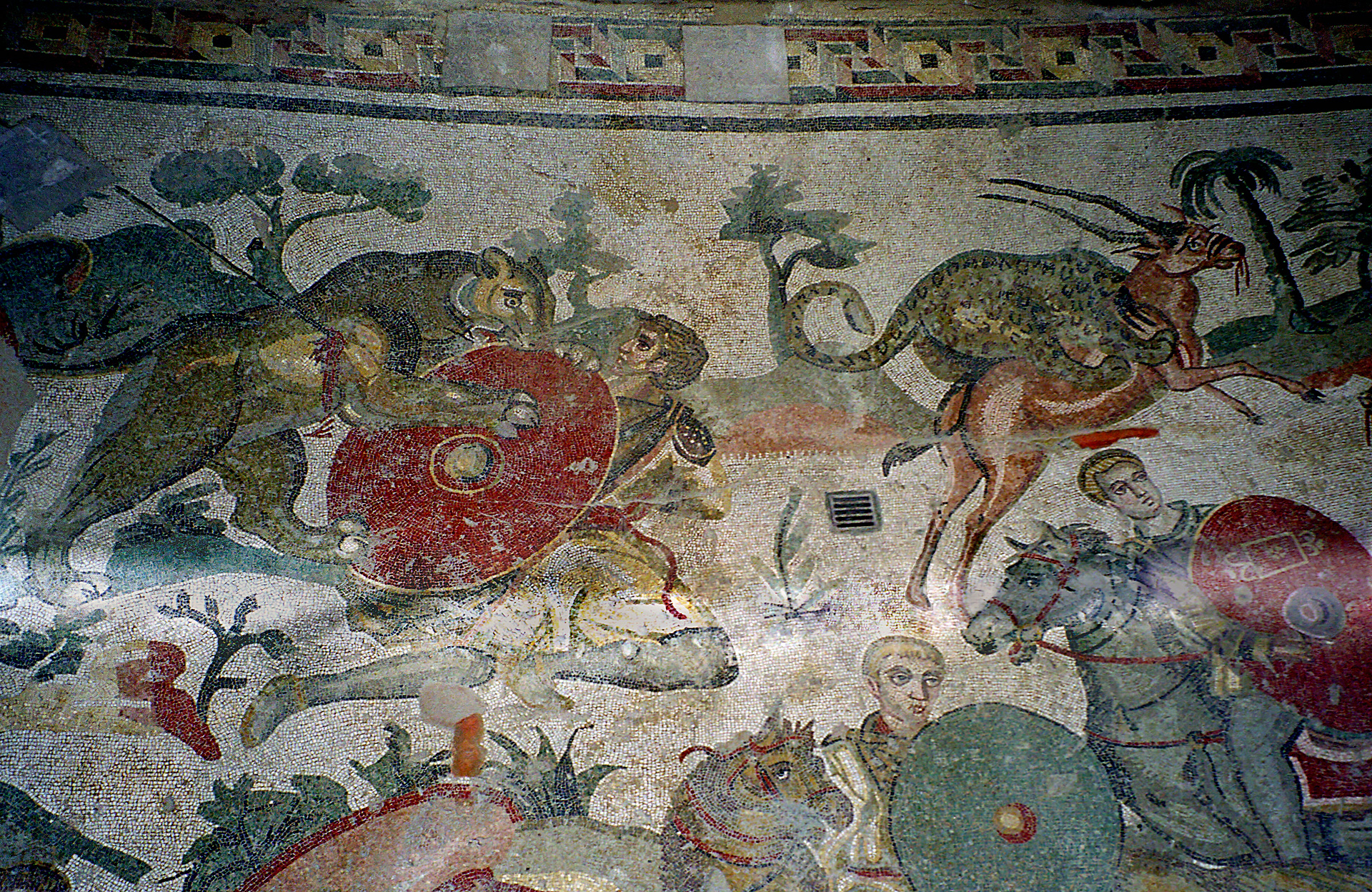
The Great Hunt; floor from the villa at Piazza Armerina, Sicily ca. 320. Figures are about life-size.

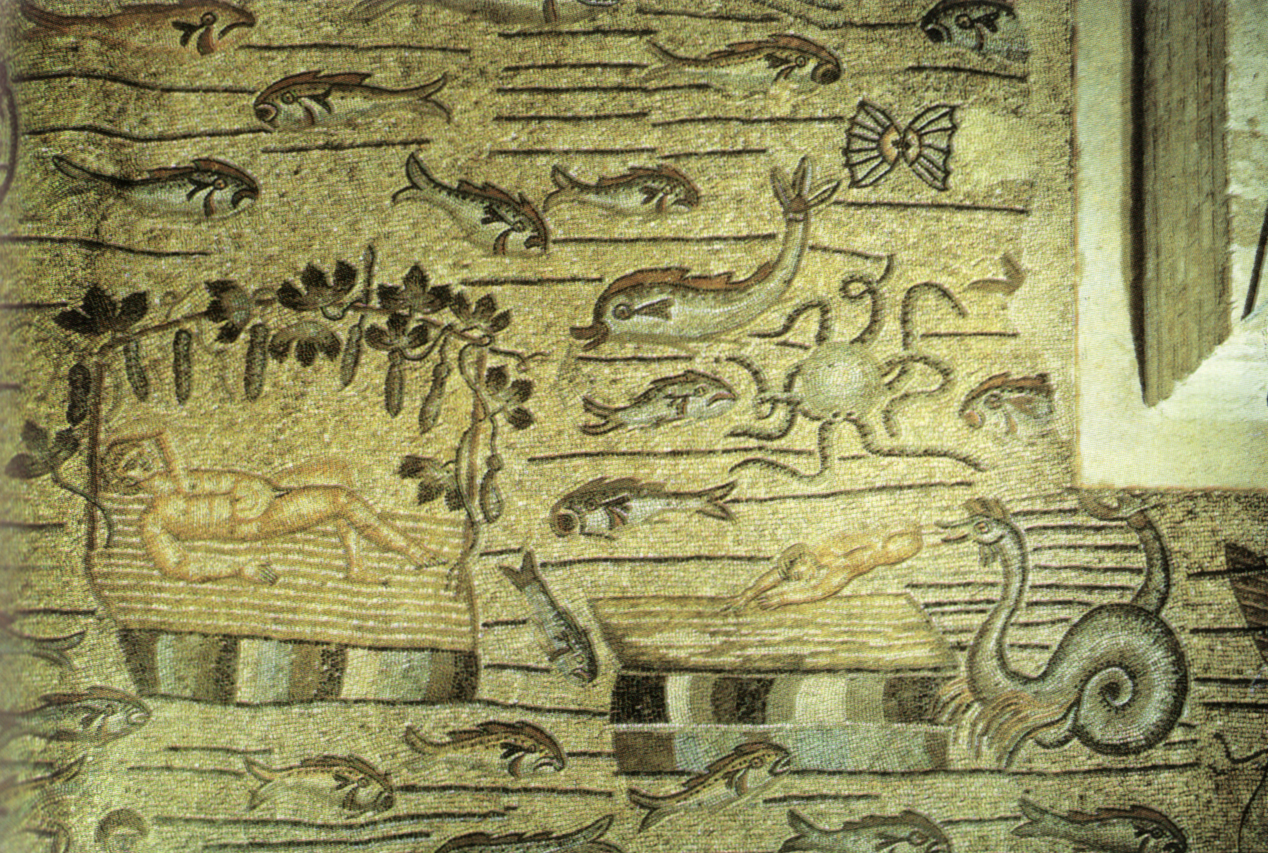
The story of Jonah, floor mosaic in Aquileia Cathedral, 314-318. Jonah is about life-size

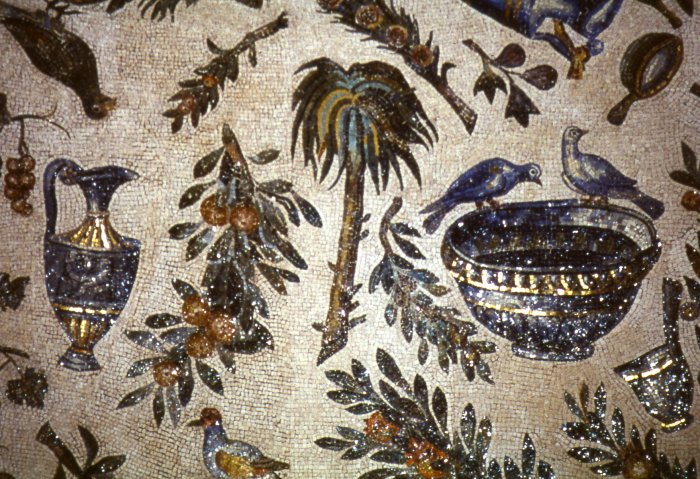
Santa Costanza ceiling detail, 324-6

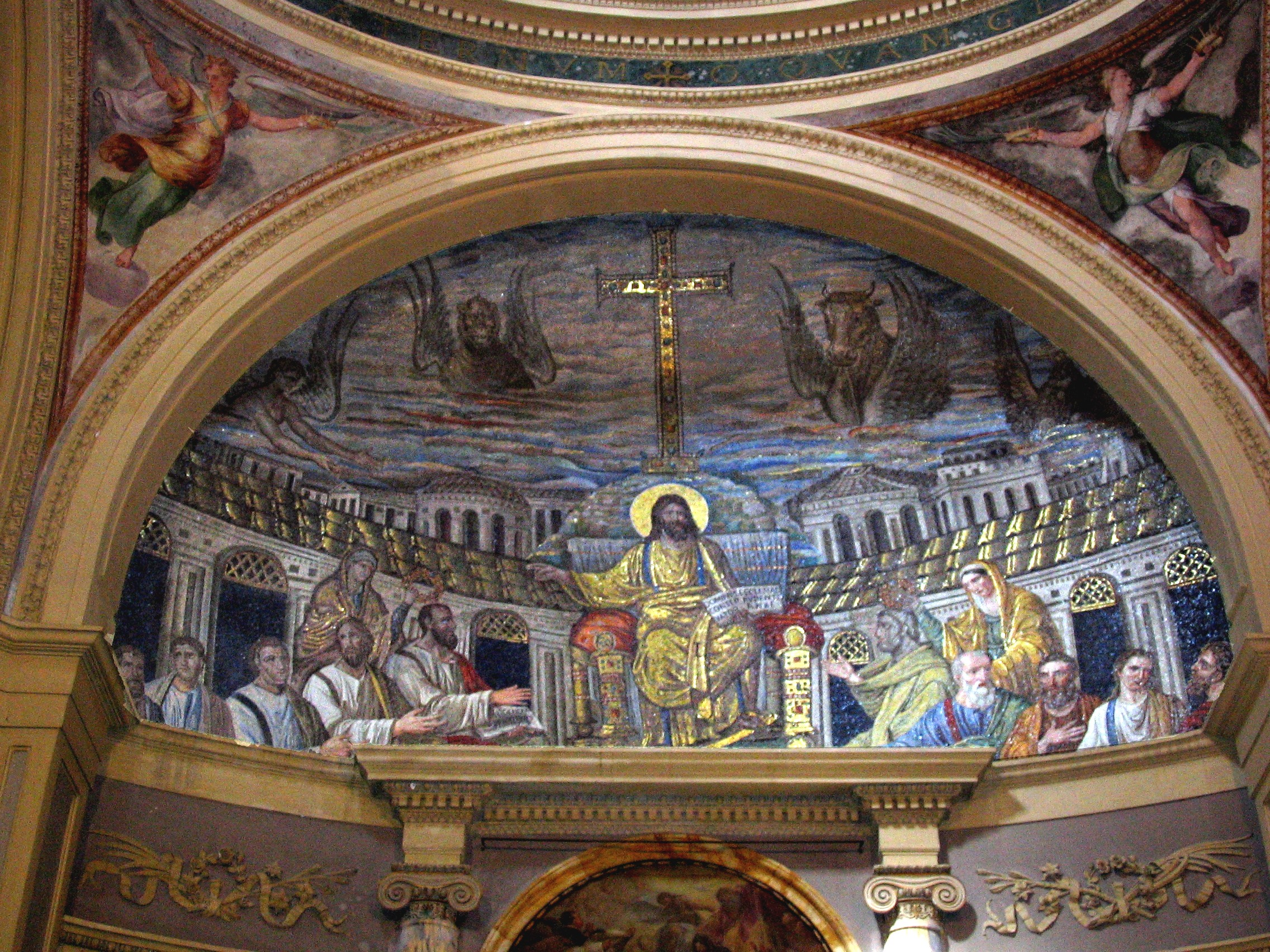
Santa Pudenziana apse mosaic, 384-9

"Early Roman mosaics belonged to the floor"; except in Nero's Domus Aurea, there is little evidence of ambitious wall mosaics before the Christian period, even at Pompeii and surrounding sites, where chances of survival were better than elsewhere. The famous Alexander Mosaic (c. 100) from Pompeii was a floor, and the main use of vertical mosaics was for places unsuitable for frescos, such as fountains, baths and garden architecture including the very popular nymphaeum.

Sumptuous floor mosaics found by archaeology in villas continue into the Late Antique period, including those at the Villa Romana del Casale at Piazza Armerina and the Gladiator Mosaic, both of about the 320s. In contrast, the floors of Early Christian churches contained very little figurative art, no doubt largely because it was considered inappropriate to walk on sacred images. The church floors are mostly geometrical, with small images in compartments of animals and the like, whereas the most important villa floors may contain huge scenes with many figures. The major surviving exception is the floor of the Cathedral at Aquileia, which is the earliest large area of Christian mosaic in Italy, dating to 314-18. This has large images of Christian symbols such as are seen in the Catacombs of Rome, including the Good Shepherd and Jonah and the whale, but no direct depictions of Christ. The Tomb of the Julii, under and pre-dating St Peter's, Rome also has symbolic images, including a famous one of Christ as the sun god in his chariot. This subject also has the gold ground not usually seen until the end of the 4th century.

=== Late antique Rome ===
==== Santa Costanza ====
The 4th-century mosaics in the churches of Rome have few contemporary equivalents elsewhere. There were mosaics in the Lateran Basilica built by Emperor Constantine I from 312. The earliest to survive are in Santa Costanza, built under Constantine and the mausoleum of his daughters Constantina and Helena. These mosaics decorate both the walls and ceilings of the church, depicting biblical scenes, mostly from the Old Testament, and surrounded by a flowing river, were destroyed in 1620 and only survive in some sketches. The vaulted ceiling of the ambulatory retains its mosaics of 324-6 of various decorative designs with small birds, figures, pastoral scenes and putti in compartments in a geometric framework in some sections, and in arrangements of foliage in others. Despite the efforts of art historians to extract Christian symbolism from these components, the assembly is essentially derived from pagan decorative schemes for grand buildings. The work is of very high quality and in good condition, although restored. There is also a 5th-century apse mosaic of the Traditio Legis with a standing, lightly bearded Christ with arm upraised. Some other scenes from the same period survive, heavily restored.

==== Santa Pudenziana ====
Santa Pudenziana has an apse mosaic of 384-9 with an unusually complicated composition of the Traditio Legis. A heavily bearded Christ sits on a rich jewelled throne below a large crux gemmata (jewelled cross) on a small mountain. Christ is flanked by two groups of five Apostles, headed by Saints Peter and Paul, who have laurel wreaths held over their heads by two female figures representing the church of the Jews and of the Gentiles respectively. Behind Christ stretches a portico with a tiled roof, above which a large cityscape of grand buildings can be seen. In the sky there are large Evangelists' symbols. The mosaic has been little restored.

==== Santa Maria Maggiore ====
Santa Maria Maggiore has a large area of mosaics, probably from 432-440. They cover the apse, the "triumphal arch" (equivalent to the chancel arch), and sections, originally much larger, of the nave walls, where 27 of an original 42 panels remain from a sequence of scenes from the Old Testament. They are right at the top of the wall and hard to see. The apse mosaic is now mostly Coronation of the Virgin of 1295 by Jacopo Torriti; it was probably originally composed of the giant foliage scrolls that remain to the upper sides. San Clemente retains a similar apse mosaic, now a reworking of 1299, following the 5th-century original. The triumphal arch has the earliest surviving monumental cycle of the Life of the Virgin, dedicatee of the church, and is thought to have been put up by Pope Sixtus III (432–40) to celebrate the Council of Ephesus, where Marian doctrine triumphed over the Nestorians.

==== Santi Cosma e Damiano ====
The apse of Santi Cosma e Damiano (526–30) shows a raised-up standing Christ, bearded and in plain robes, with Saints Cosmas and Damian, Saint Theodore and Pope Felix IV being presented to him by Peter and Paul. Below this scene twelve sheep on a gold background represent the Apostles, flanking the Lamb of God. Both registers have grassy ground-levels, the upper one with rocks and plants, and two palm trees at the extreme sides. The faces are elongated in the Byzantine manner, and St Theodore wears the dress of a Byzantine courtier with a tablion and richly-patterned robe.

=== Ravenna ===
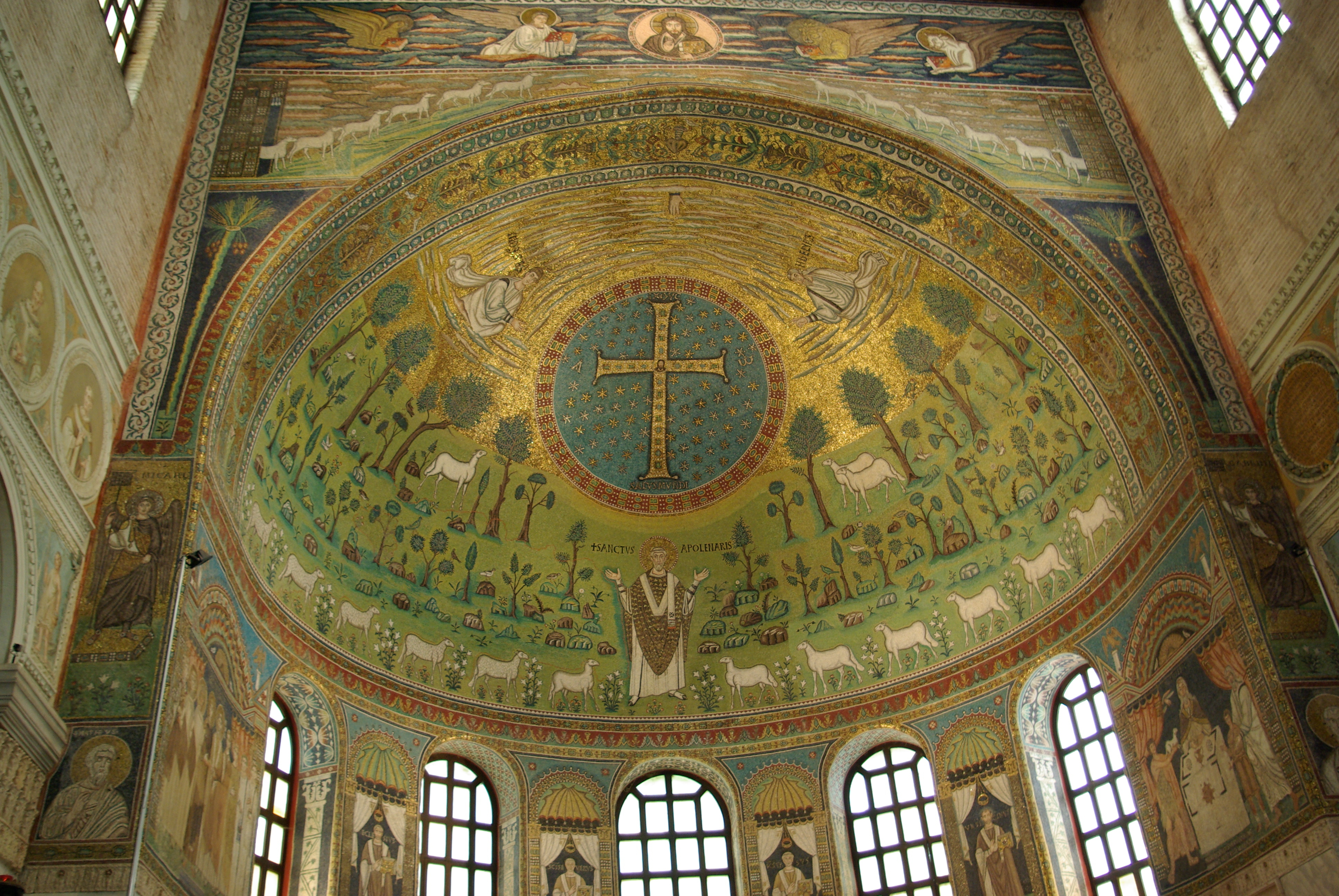
Triumphal arch and apse semi-dome in Basilica of Sant' Apollinare in Classe, Ravenna (549)

Ravenna was made the capital of the Western Roman Empire (replacing Milan) in 402. It remained a capital until the 8th century, first of the Ostrogothic Kingdom from 493 and then after 540 the Byzantine Exarchate of Ravenna, before returning to the small-town status that has preserved its church buildings so well, though the palaces of the rulers and court have all been lost. Eight early Christian monuments of Ravenna, all with significant mosaics, are on the World Heritage List. These are:

- Neonian Baptistery ("Orthodox Baptistery") (c. 430)
- Mausoleum of Galla Placidia (c. 430)
- Arian Baptistry (c. 500)
- Archiepiscopal Chapel (c. 500)
- Basilica of Sant'Apollinare Nuovo (c. 500)
- Mausoleum of Theodoric (520)
- Basilica of San Vitale (548)
- Basilica of Sant' Apollinare in Classe (549)

=== Other Cities ===
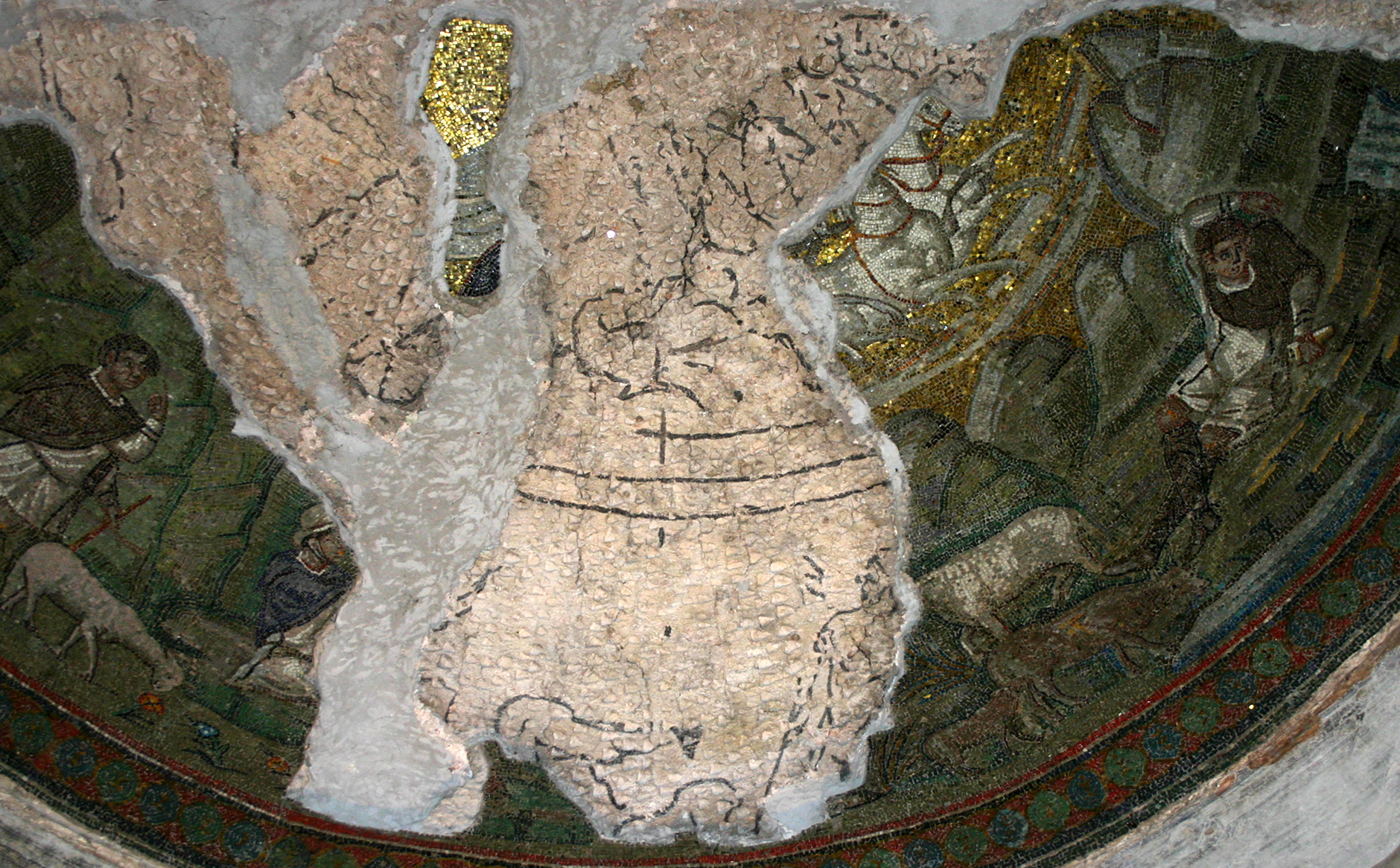
Basilica of San Lorenzo, Milan, with underdrawing revealed.

Milan was the main military centre of Northern Italy, controlling the roads to the north, and the effective capital of Constantius II, Constantine's son. The large octagonal Chapel of San Aquilino in the Basilica of San Lorenzo, Milan was perhaps built as an Imperial mausoleum for Galla Placidia about 400. It has an apse mosaic of a Traditio Legis with a beardless Christ in white robes flanked by the apostles, as part of a much larger scheme, now remaining only in fragments. In one area the mosaic has fallen away to reveal the underdrawing. There are some figures of saints and a dome of about 470 in Sant'Ambrogio.

Other relatively modest mosaics are found in several places, including a 5th-century domed ceiling in the baptistery of Naples Cathedral. Just outside modern Italy, but within the older borders, is the Euphrasian Basilica at Poreč (Parenzo), Istria with extensive mosaics of about 530 on the apse and triumphal arch. For the first time, the Virgin Mary, surrounded by saints, takes the centre of the apse semi-dome composition, with a beardless Christ in Majesty at the centre of the arch.

== Early Medieval mosaics (550-1200) ==
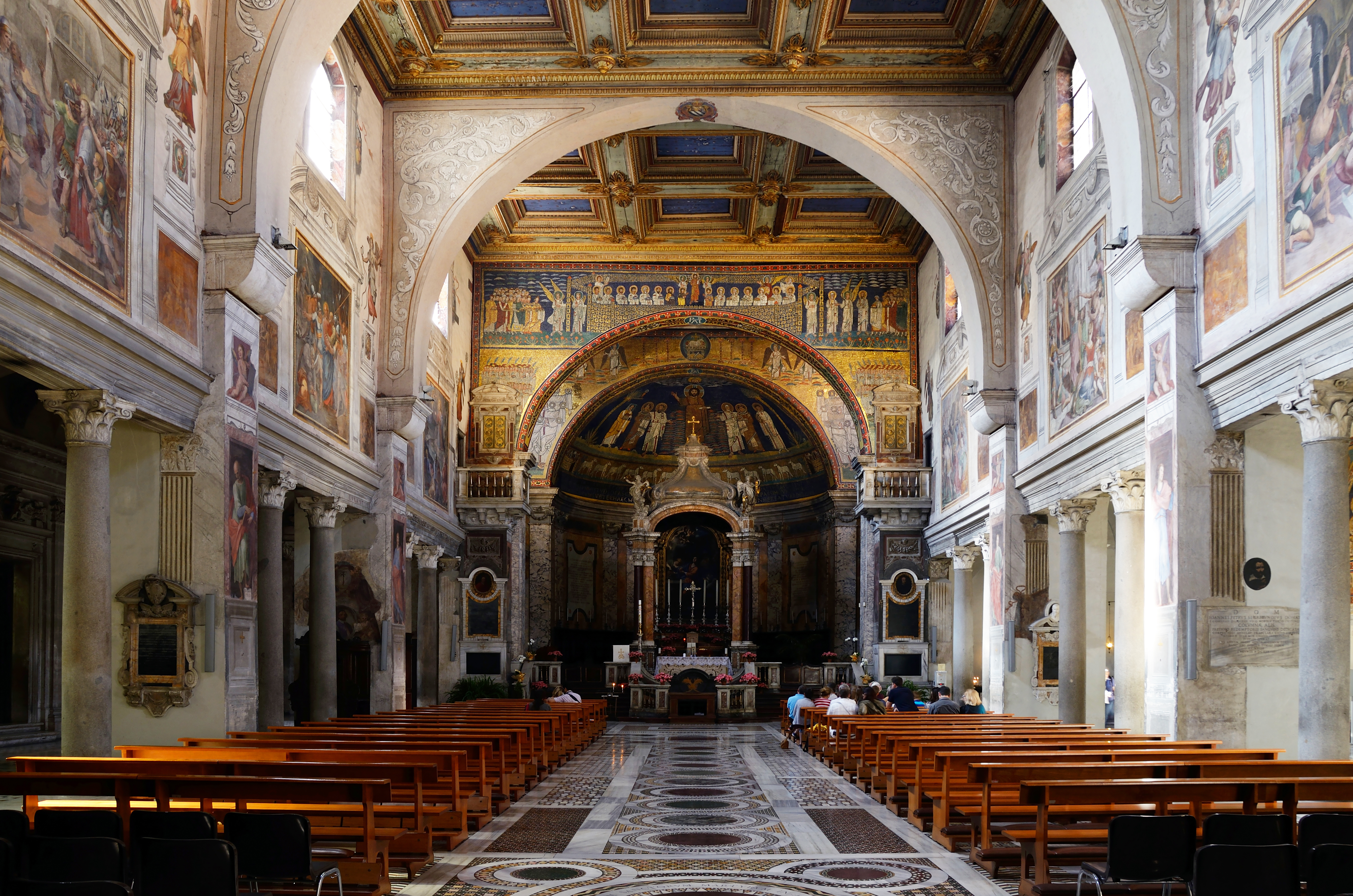
Santa Prassede, ca 820

=== Rome ===
Four churches in Rome have mosaics of saints near where their relics were held; these all show an abandonment of classical illusionism for large-eyed figures floating in space. Rome had been in Byzantine hands from 536-545, which may explain the change. They are San Lorenzo fuori le Mura (580s), Sant'Agnese fuori le mura (625-38), Santo Stefano Rotondo (640s), and the chapel of San Venanzio in the Lateran Basilica (c. 640) The only 8th-century mosaics known are those in the tomb chapel of Pope John VII in Old St Peter's, which were recorded in drawings before the building was demolished, and of which some fragments were salvaged. Around a central Virgin Orans, with the Pope kneeling to her, were three registers of scenes from the Life of Christ.

With the political stability brought about by the Frankish conquest of Italy there was a new burst of production of major Roman mosaics in the Carolingian period. The great hall (triclinium) of the Lateran Palace had religious mosaics in its apse-like semi-dome which survive, now moved outside and very heavily restored. Five churches in Rome have mosaics from this period:Santi Nereo e Achilleo (c. 814) has an iconographically eccentric programme at the east end, while Santa Prassede and Santa Cecilia in Trastevere (both c.820) and San Marco (commissioned between 828 and 848) all have semi-domes following that of Santi Cosma e Damiano (526-30 - above) with Saints Peter and Paul presenting martyrs and the donor Pope carrying a model of the church. Santa Maria in Domnica (c. 820) has an enthroned Madonna and Child in the midst of saints and angels.

=== Monte Cassino ===
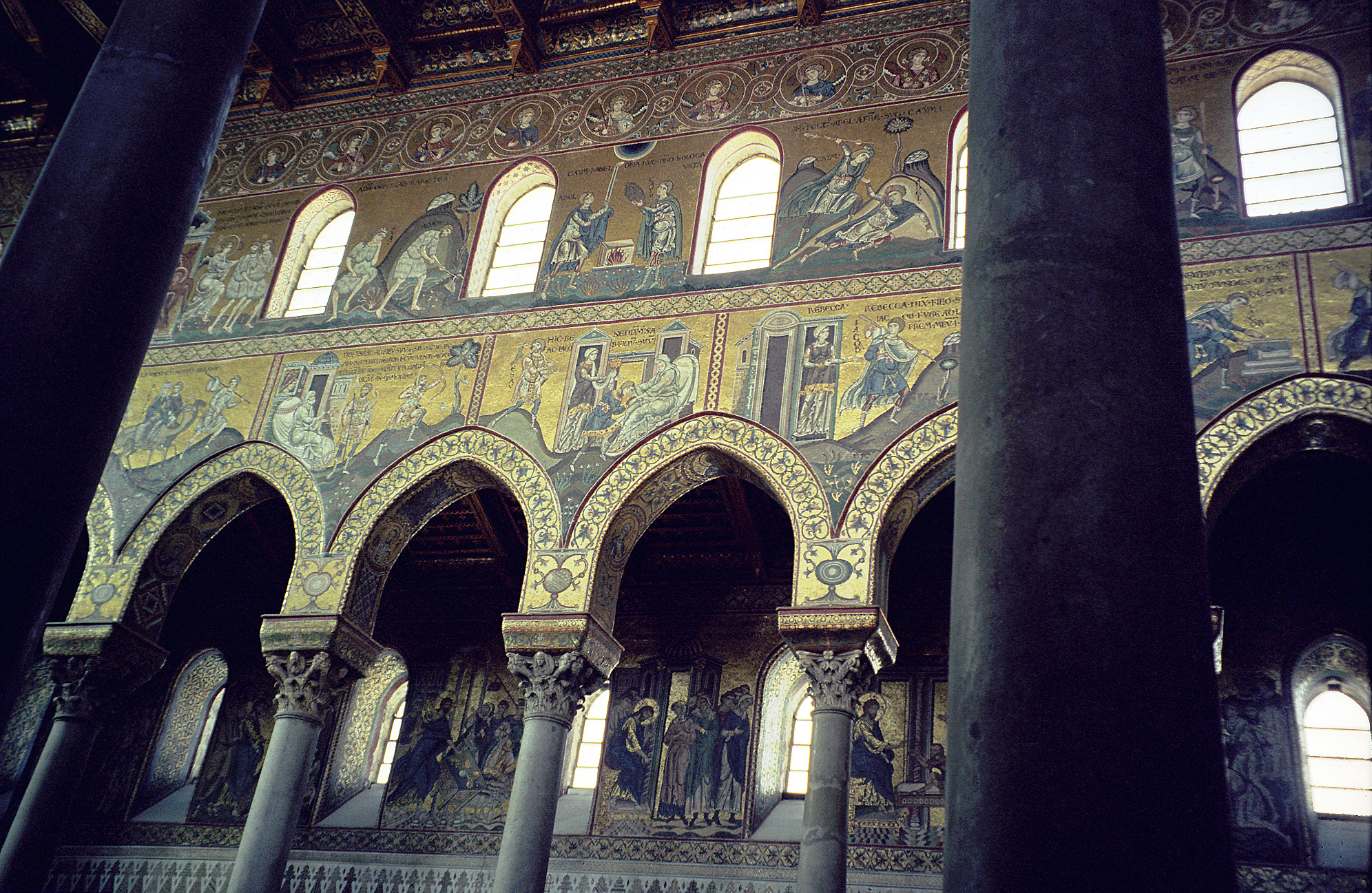
Monreale Cathedral, Sicily, after 1174.

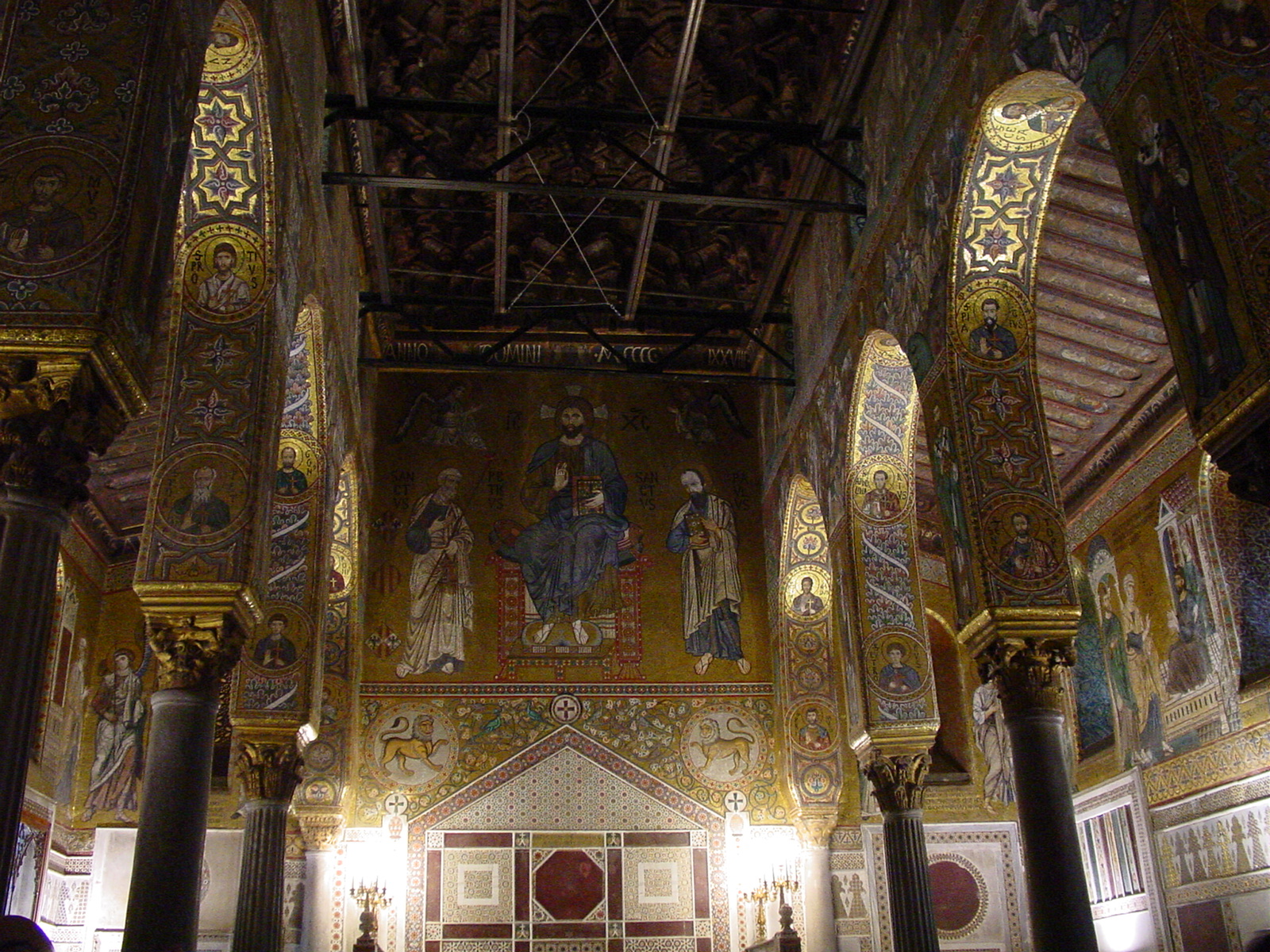
Cappella Palatina, Palermo, after 1132.

By about the 10th century, the ability to produce high-quality mosaic work had been lost in Italy, and the best work was created by teams despatched by Byzantine Emperors as diplomatic favours. In the late 11th century local craftsmanship began to revive, no doubt with some initial Byzantine input. The important mosaics at Monte Cassino Abbey, made by Byzantine craftsmen between about 1066 and 1071, when Desiderius, the future Pope Victor III, was abbot, had all disappeared (except for small fragments) long before the abbey was destroyed by an American air raid in 1944. Their style was probably similar to the remaining sections of the scheme at Salerno Cathedral, created around 1085 by a close colleague of Desiderius. According to the abbey chronicler Leo of Ostia Desiderius ensured that monks learnt the skills of the Greek craftsmen.

=== Norman Sicily ===
The Cappella Palatina is the royal chapel of the Norman kings of Sicily in the Palazzo Reale in Palermo, and was commissioned by Roger II of Sicily in 1132. Initially Greek craftsmen were imported, but later work appears to have been done, in a rather less refined style, by local craftsmen in the 1160s and 1170s.; Cefalù Cathedral was also begun by Roger with Greek artists in the 1130s, but the full scheme of mosaics was never finished. The Martorana church in Palermo has mosaics from the same period, though in a slightly different style.

The Cathedral at Monreale was begun in 1174 and has the largest area of mosaic from before 1200 to survive in Italy. The Palazzo Reale and the castle at Zisa, Palermo have the only significant panels of secular mosaics to survive from the period, probably both of around 1170, both of which show considerable Islamic influence, though that may reflect the Byzantine style for such work. Confronted figures of birds, archers and lions are set around trees in geometric schemes.

=== Venice ===
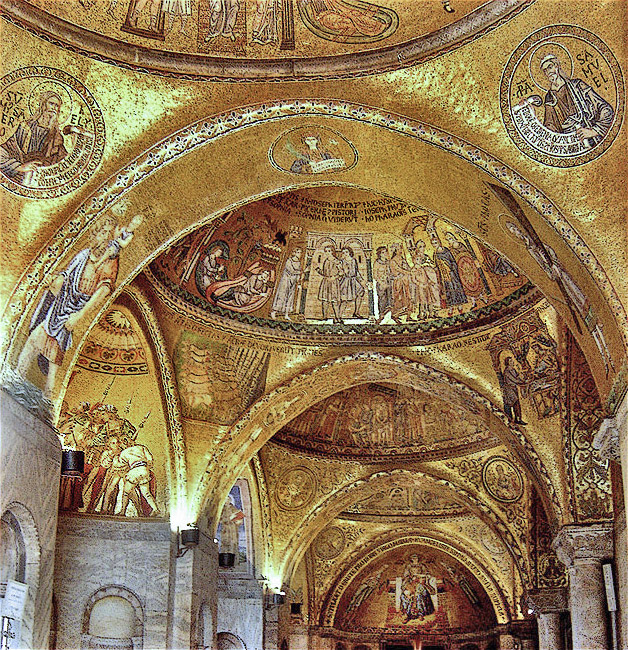
St Mark's Basilica, Venice

The earliest remaining mosaics in the neighbourhood of Venice are on its early rival island Torcello, where the Cathedral has a late 12th-century apse mosaic of famous beauty of the standing Virgin Hodegetria, isolated against a huge gold background. A Last Judgement on the west wall is of the same period; other mosaics in the cathedral are from the beginning of the 12th and perhaps the 11th centuries. The Church of Santa Maria e San Donato on the nearby island of Murano has a similar, but 13th century, Virgin apse mosaic, as well as an opus sectile floor from 1140.

The present St Mark's Basilica in Venice was begun in 1061, and its walls have been entirely decorated with mosaic, often replaced, with work continuing until the 17th century. St Mark's is the largest of the remaining handful of buildings, in Ravenna, Sicily, Turkey and Greece, which retain the unique impact of a full mosaic interior. Some traces of mosaic from before a devastating fire in 1106 probably remain, but the majority of the original mosaics date from the following three centuries, though often heavily restored or entirely redone as copies. They move from a Byzantinesque style to a more Romanesque one. Later Renaissance additions are fortunately not over-prominent, as they are generally regarded as unhappy mistakes.

Otto Demus believes that the early mosaics were created by local workshops aware of recent Byzantine work, and perhaps including, or trained by, Greeks. Whatever there may once have been, hardly any other mosaic work remains in the city.

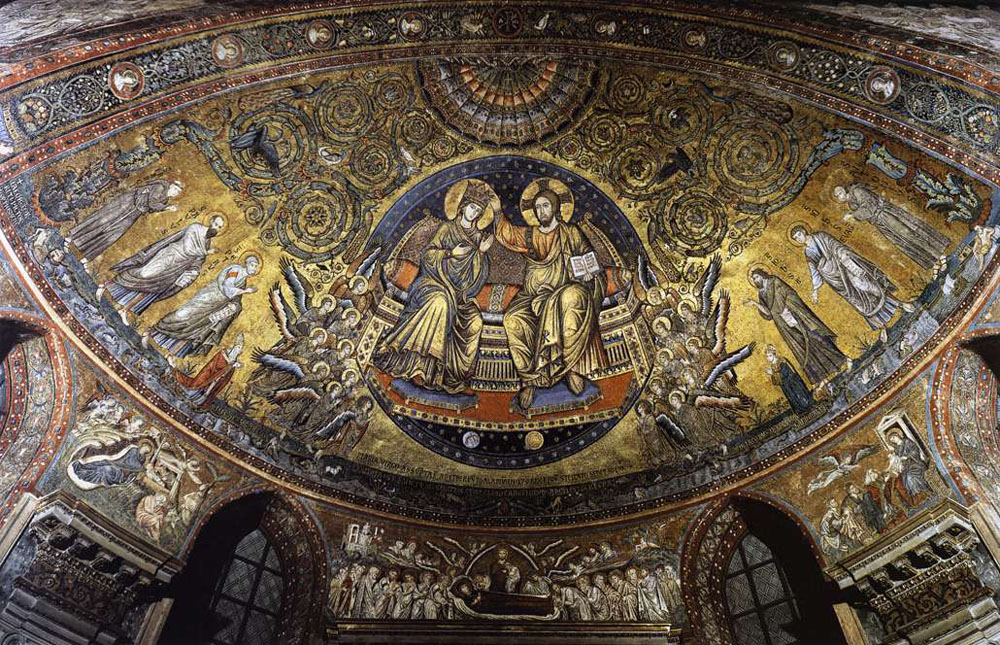
Jacopo Torriti, Coronation of the Virgin, Santa Maria Maggiore, Rome, c. 1296

== High Medieval period (1200-1400) ==
=== Rome ===
In the 1220s, the Pope needed to ask Venice for craftsmen to execute the apse mosaic of San Paolo Fuori le Mura, but towards the end of the 13th century Rome was once again able to produce fine mosaics with local teams. From this period, the artists responsible for their design begin to be known; they were primarily painters, and presumably mainly responsible for the design, working with specialist teams of mosaicists. The most significant of this first period are Pietro Cavallini, Jacopo Torriti and Giotto.

== See also ==
- List of Early Christian and Medieval mosaic
