= Aniconism in Buddhism =

Purported concept of early Buddhists not to depict the Buddha's person

Since the beginning of the serious study of the history of Buddhist art in the 1890s, the earliest phase, lasting until the 1st century CE, has been described as aniconic; the Buddha was only represented through symbols such as an empty throne, Bodhi tree, a riderless horse with a parasol floating above an empty space (at Sanchi), Buddha's footprints, and the dharma wheel.

== Historical background ==
=== In the Sarvastivada vinaya ===
This aniconism in relation to the image of the Buddha could be in conformity with an ancient Buddhist prohibition against showing the Buddha himself in human form, known from the Sarvastivada vinaya (rules of the early Buddhist school of the Sarvastivada):

"Since it is not permitted to make an image of the Buddha's body, I pray that the Buddha will grant that I can make an image of the attendant Bodhisattva. Is that acceptable?" The Buddha answered: "You may make an image of the Bodhisattava".

=== In the Theravada commentaries ===
In Theravadin Pali literature, the textual basis for the reluctance to create Buddharūpa (Buddha images) during his lifetime stems from the commentaries (Aṭṭhakathā), specifically in the introductory story of the Kālingabodhi Jātaka (Jātaka No. 479). When discussing the appropriateness of objects of reverence (cetiya), the Buddha rejected the creation of an uddesika cetiya (indicative objects such as images) to represent him. John Strong notes that according to the commentary, the Buddha considered such man-made representations to be "groundless" (avatthuka) because their form is merely a product of the mind or imagination (manamattaka). Therefore, making statues was seen as lacking a meaningful foundation while the Buddha was still alive.

"How many shrines are there?"—"Three, Ānanda."—"Which are they?"—"Shrines for a relic of the body, a relic of use or wear, a relic of memorial"—"Can a shrine be made, Sir, during your life?"—"No, Ānanda, not a body-shrine; that kind is made when a Buddha enters Nirvana. A shrine of memorial is improper because the connection depends on the imagination only. But the great bo-tree used by the Buddhas is fit for a shrine, be they alive or be they dead."

=== First anthropomorphic representation ===
Although there is still some debate, the first anthropomorphic representations of the Buddha himself are often considered a result of the Greco-Buddhist interaction, in particular in Gandhara, a theory first fully expounded by Alfred A. Foucher, but criticised from the start by Ananda Coomaraswamy. Foucher also accounted for the origins of the aniconic symbols themselves in small souvenirs carried away from the main pilgrimage sites and so becoming recognised and popularized as symbolic of the events associated with the site. Other explanations were that it was inappropriate to represent one who had attained nirvana.

=== Scholarly debates ===
However, in 1990, the notion of aniconism in Buddhism was challenged by Susan Huntington, initiating a vigorous debate among specialists that still continues. She sees many early scenes claimed to be aniconic as in fact not depicting scenes from the life of the Buddha, but worship of cetiya (relics) or re-enactments by devotees at the places where these scenes occurred. Thus the image of the empty throne shows an actual relic-throne at Bodh Gaya or elsewhere. This is said to be still depicting the Buddha, but not the "human" Buddha. Original points about aniconism in Buddhism made by Foucher would claim this depiction and the Buddha as separate. Huntington's criticisms stems to the purpose on specific pieces of art, with some ideas that many of these ideas of aniconism are lacking evidence; with many meanings that we perceive with aniconism were never intentional. She points out that there is only one indirect reference for a specific aniconic doctrine in Buddhism to be found, and that pertaining to only one sect.

As for the archeological evidence, it shows some anthropomorphic sculptures of the Buddha actually existing during the supposedly aniconic period, which ended during the 1st century CE. Huntington also rejects the association of "aniconic" and "iconic" art with an emerging division between Theravada and Mahayana Buddhism. Huntington's views have been challenged by Vidya Dehejia and others. Although some earlier examples have been found in recent years, it is common ground that the large free-standing iconic images of the Buddha so prominent in later Buddhist art are not found in the earliest period; discussion is focused on smaller figures in relief panels, conventionally considered to represent scenes from the life of the Buddha, and now re-interpreted by Huntington and her supporters. A major point in conversation that is discussed by Huntington is that there is still more work to be done looking into the topic of this field. Many points can still be made that disprove what was said by Huntington, so that main point can fully be looked into further.

== Aniconism and anthropomorphism ==
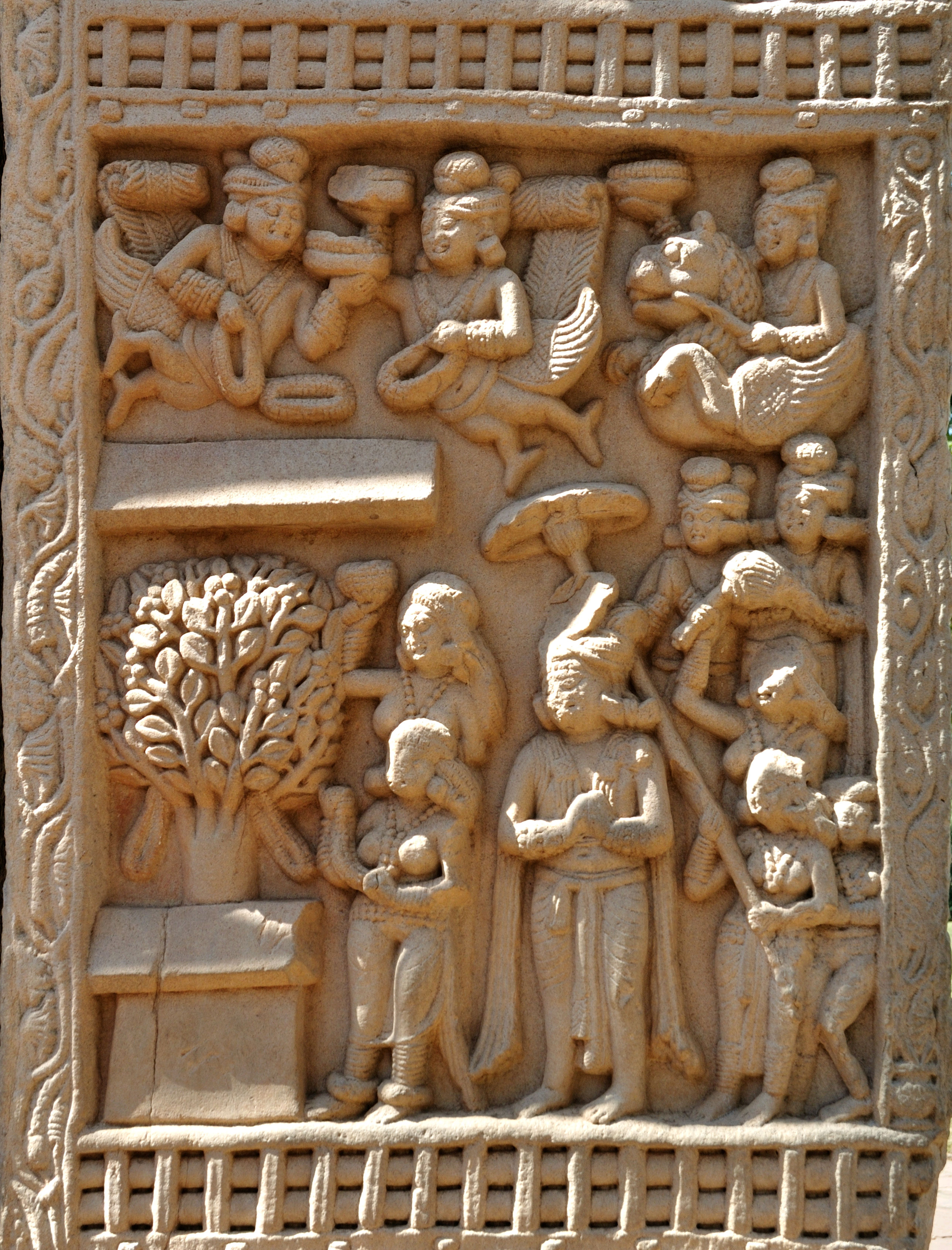
Aniconism in Miracle at Kapilavastu: King Suddhodana praying as his son the Buddha rises in the air, praised by celestial beings (but only the Buddha's path, the Chankrama horizontal slab in the air, is visible).

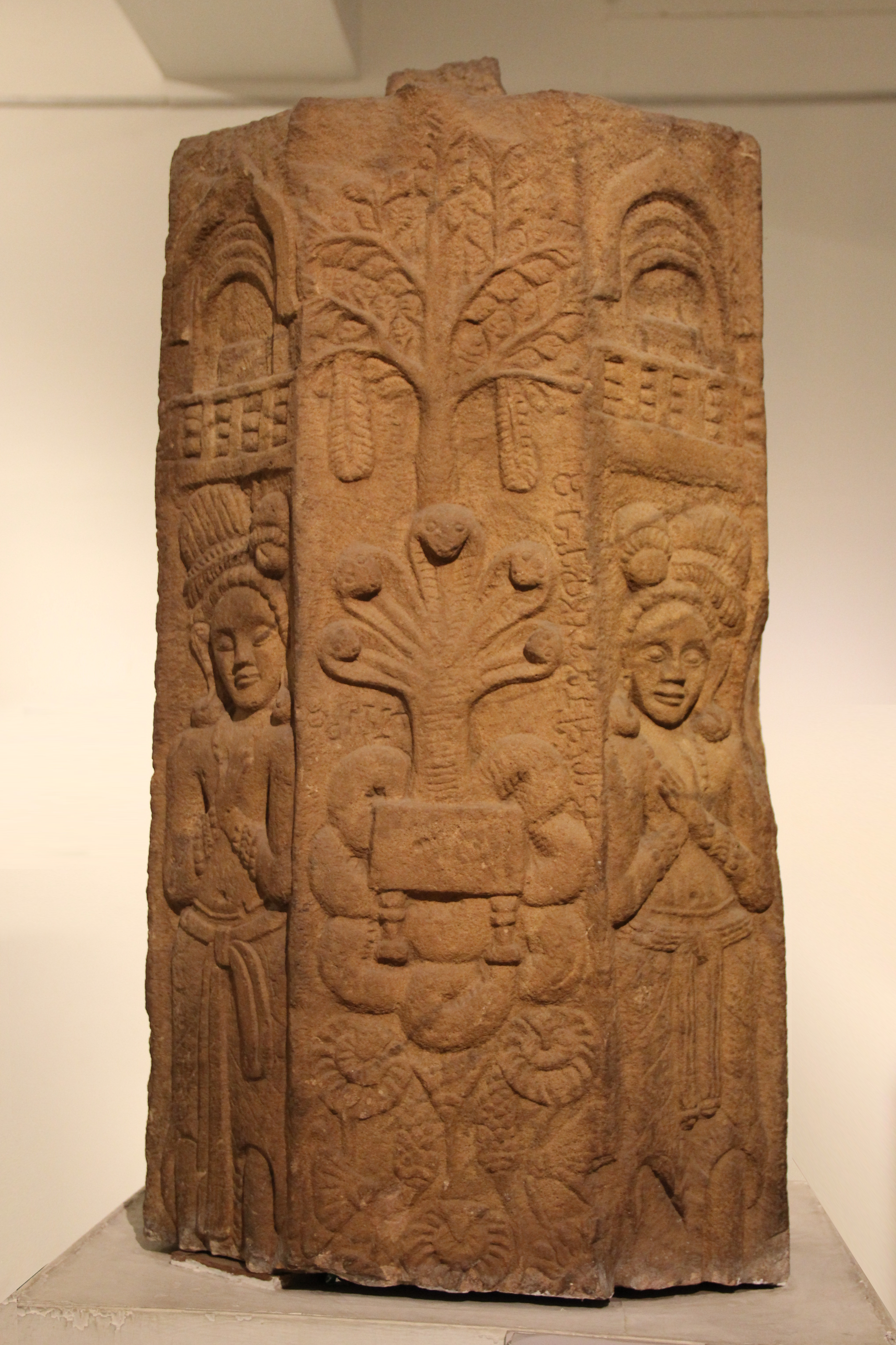
Pillar with Naga Mucalinda protecting the throne of the Buddha. Railing pillar from Jagannath Tekri, Pauni (Bhandara District). 2nd–1st century BCE. National Museum of India.

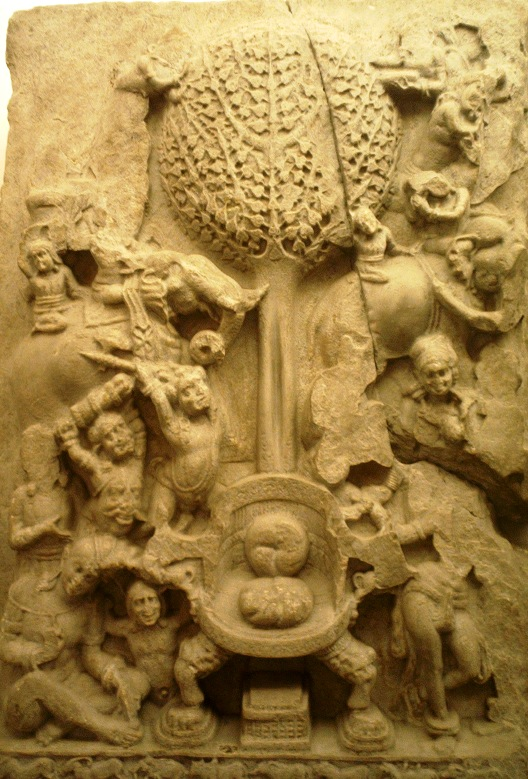
An aniconic representation of Mara's assault on the Buddha, with an empty throne, 2nd century, Amaravati, India.

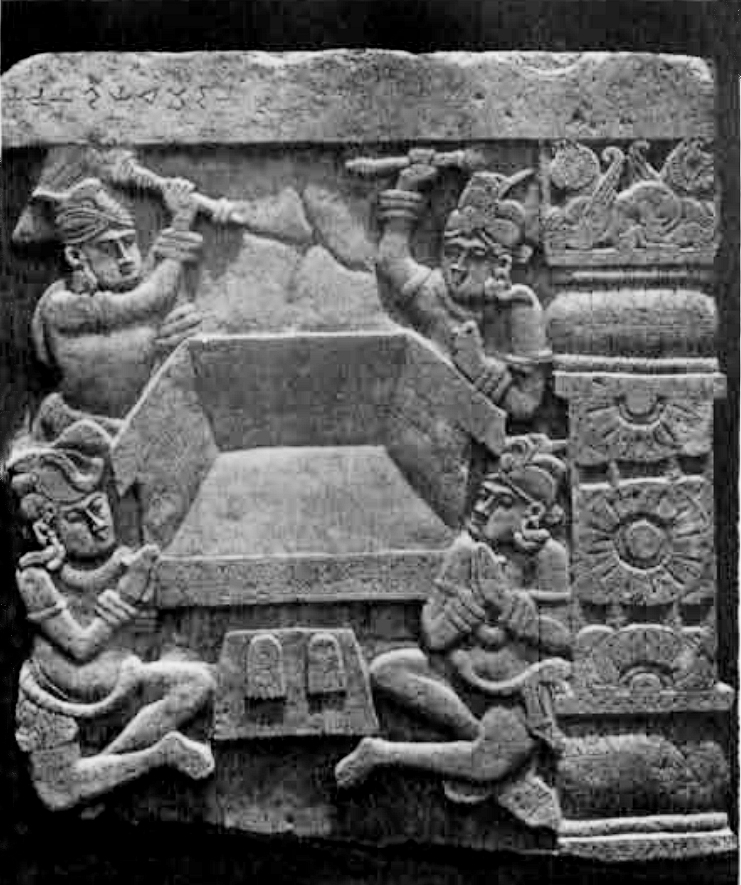
Devotions to the empty throne of the Buddha, Kanaganahalli, 1st–3rd century CE

Depending on the schools of art or the period, the Buddha can only appear through his symbols, or in anthropomorphological form, in similar works of art.

Sanchi and the Greco-Buddhist art of Gandhara
	Maya's dream	The Great Departure	Mara's attack	Enlightenment	The Buddha Preaching
Sanchi (1st c. BCE/CE)	Maya's dream of a white elephant.	The Buddha, under the umbrella on the chariot, is not illustrated.	The Buddha is symbolized by an empty throne.	The Buddha is symbolized by an empty throne.	The Buddha is symbolized by an empty throne.
Greco-Buddhist art of Gandhara (1st c.CE-4th c.CE)	Very similar illustration from Gandhara.	The Buddha in person leaves the city.	The Buddha is illustrated centrally.	The Buddha is illustrated centrally.	The Buddha is illustrated centrally.

== Later periods ==
In later periods both the major schools of Buddhism have made great use of representational art, though Theravada temples and other sites typically concentrate on a single large sculpture of the Buddha, whereas Mahayana temples have larger numbers of images of a greater variety of figures with varying degrees of spiritual significance. However some schools, such as Zen Buddhism in Japan and some Theravada Buddhism orders in Myanmar, have also shown a general tendency towards aniconism.

=== Burmese Theravada orders ===
The members of the Hngettwin Gaing, a Theravada Buddhist order from Myanmar, do not use buddharūpa (Buddha images) as objects of veneration, preferring instead to pay respect directly through contemplations on the Buddha and his teachings. Similarly, adherents of Tai Zawti, a sect belonging to the Thudhamma Gaing order, maintain aniconic practices by keeping no Buddha images in their homes, choosing instead to place lik long (palm-leaf manuscripts) of Buddhist texts on their altars.

== See also ==
- Gautama Buddha
- Dhamma
- Sangha
- Three Refuges
- Five Precepts
- Pāli Canon
- Cetiya
- Iconoclasm
