= Arian Baptistery =

UNESCO World Heritage Site
- Arian Baptistry ceiling mosaic

- Location within Italy
- Location: Ravenna, Italy
- Part of: Early Christian Monuments of Ravenna
- Criteria: Cultural: (i), (ii), (iii), (iv)
- Reference: 788-006
- Inscription: 1996 (20th Session)
- Area: 0.008 ha (860 sq ft)
- Buffer zone: 0.68 ha (73,000 sq ft)
- Coordinates: 44°25′07″N 12°12′09″E

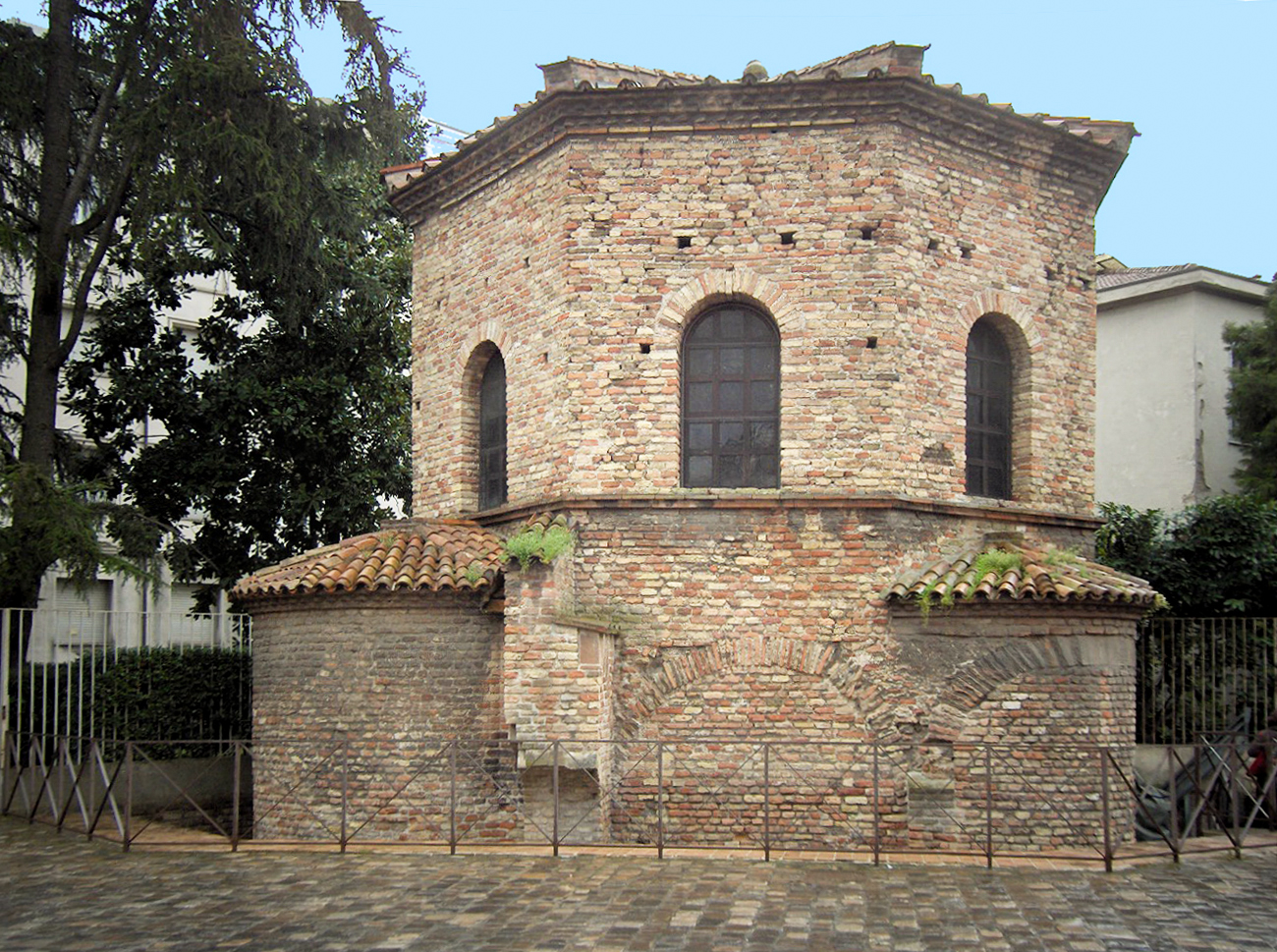
The Arian baptistry

The Arian Baptistry in Ravenna, Italy is a Christian baptismal building that was erected by the Ostrogothic King Theodoric the Great between the end of the 5th century and the beginning of the 6th century A.D., at the same time as the Basilica of Sant' Apollinare Nuovo.

Theodoric the Great was an Arian Christian who spent his formative years as a hostage in Constantinople, where he received a comprehensive education that included imperial customs. As an adult Theodoric's political cunning and martial feats gained him the respect of other Goths. After years of movement within the Roman Empire, a treaty agreement with Emperor Zeno resulted in the Goths being given Ravenna to rule in the emperor's name.

Arian Christianity required separate places of worship from Chalcedonian Christianity. Theodoric did not uproot the Chalcedonian Christians who lived in Ravenna. Instead, separate places of worship were commissioned, resulting in the construction of an Arian cathedral and baptistery.

The octagonal baptistery was constructed with brick, and the interior would have been adorned by many mosaics, but today, only the dome's mosaic remains, depicting a scene of Jesus' baptism.

The baptistery shares several similarities with the Orthodox Baptistery of Neon, in both structure and mosaic composition.

After Arianism was condemned the baptistery was converted into a Chalcedonian structure. Today, the Arian Baptistery is registered as a UNESCO World Heritage Site.

== Arianism, Theodoric, and Ravenna ==
Theodoric (known to the Goths as Theuderic, which was Hellenized to Theoderichos) was born into Arian Christianity, as it was the religion practiced by eastern Ostrogoths and western Visigoths in the Balkans. He came to Constantinople as a foreign hostage of the Roman Empire and spent his formative years receiving an education that included imperial customs and court functions, with the intention of establishing a political alliance through cooperation once he returned to his country. As an Arian Christian, Theodoric was required to worship outside of the city walls, where he joined other Arian Christians of the imperial court in worship.

As an adult, Theodoric proved to be a shrewd politician and military leader, all while maintaining relations with Constantinople, which earned him prestige among other Goths. The relationship was tenuous at times, as the Goths endured years of insecure movement within the empire as they tried to establish a place to settle through martial actions for themselves. In the year 487, the Goths erected an encampment around Constantinople that cut off the water supply. A treaty was agreed upon by both Theodoric and Emperor Zeno's courts that gave Ravenna to the Goths and had Theodoric rule the west in the emperor's name.

Theodoric was an Arian Christian. Arian Christians believed that because Jesus was the son of God he was secondary to God, as God has always existed but Jesus had not. It was deemed heretical by the Council of Nicaea in 325 CE.

As Arian Christians, it was necessary to build places of worship separate from Chalcedonian Christians. Theodoric did not uproot the Orthodox Chalcedonian Christians who lived in Ravenna. Instead, he commissioned separate places of worship for Arian Christians. The Arian cathedral was commissioned by King Theodoric in 493, and later the octagonal baptistery. The cathedral, now called the Church of Spirito Santo, was originally named Hagia Anastasis (Holy Resurrection). It was re-consecrated as the Chalcedonian cathedral of Saint Teodoro (soldier and martyr of Amasea in Pontus) in 526 AD. The primary Arian minister would have resided nearby; the residence would have included a bath, lodging for the clergy, and a villa.

Little remains of the original church after its reconstruction in 1543; some historians speculate that the original mosaics were lost over a thousand years earlier during its reconstruction due to their Arian themes.

A notable feature of King Theodoric's rule was his religious tolerance. Anonymous Valesianus claimed that he did not threaten the Nicaean religion despite being an Arian Christian. His diplomatic relationship with the Catholic Church in Rome was recorded to be amicable, and at one point, he was requested to adjudicate a dispute regarding the election of the Pope. Additionally, the church of Sant' Apollinare Nuovo's mosaic depicts the Arian interpretation of Christ's life. With there being little to differentiate the iconography from Chalcedonian beliefs, the mosaic has survived due to its inoffensive nature; Christ is depicted clad in majestic purple, and there is no visual portrayal of Christ as subordinate to God.

== Shape and structure ==
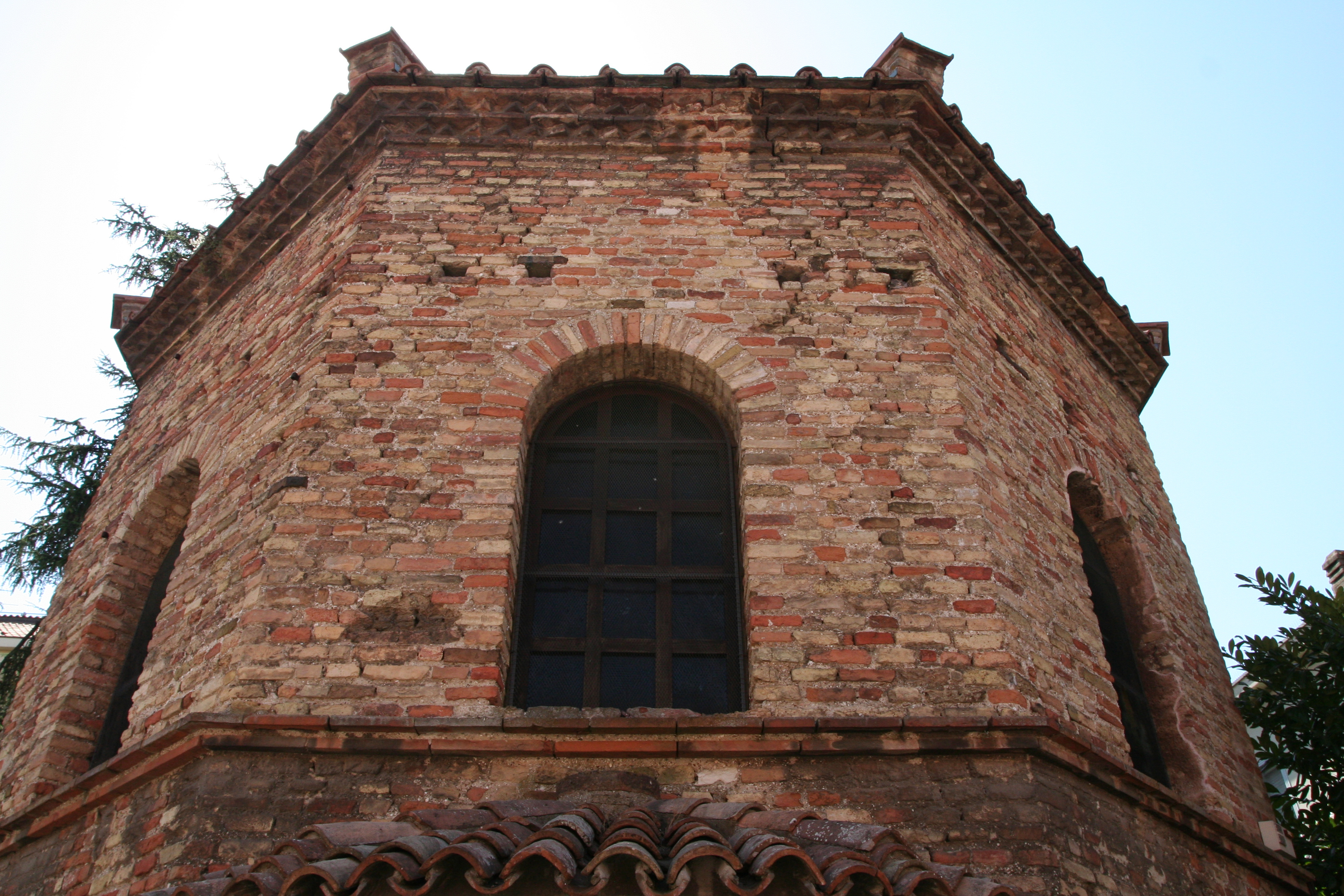
Baptistery close up

The Baptistry is octagonal in shape with four apses and arched openings near the top. At one point in its history a heptagonal ambulatory encircled it. Along the external perimeter there was once a walkway that stopped at the eastern apse.

The building is composed of brick, some of which were recycled from older structures. In its prime the interior would have been decorated with marble other richly detailed mosaics, but today only the dome's mosaic remains. Composed of stone and glass tesserae, today it survives mostly intact. Arian Christianity dictated churches and baptismal facilities to be in separate buildings, so the adjoining cathedral, now known as Spirito Santo, was constructed nearby.

Six graves have been discovered within the octagon. This is unusual because it is a Baptistery, but it is not unheard of that baptisteries would contain graves in Late Antiquity because it is recorded that church councils had laws forbidding it.

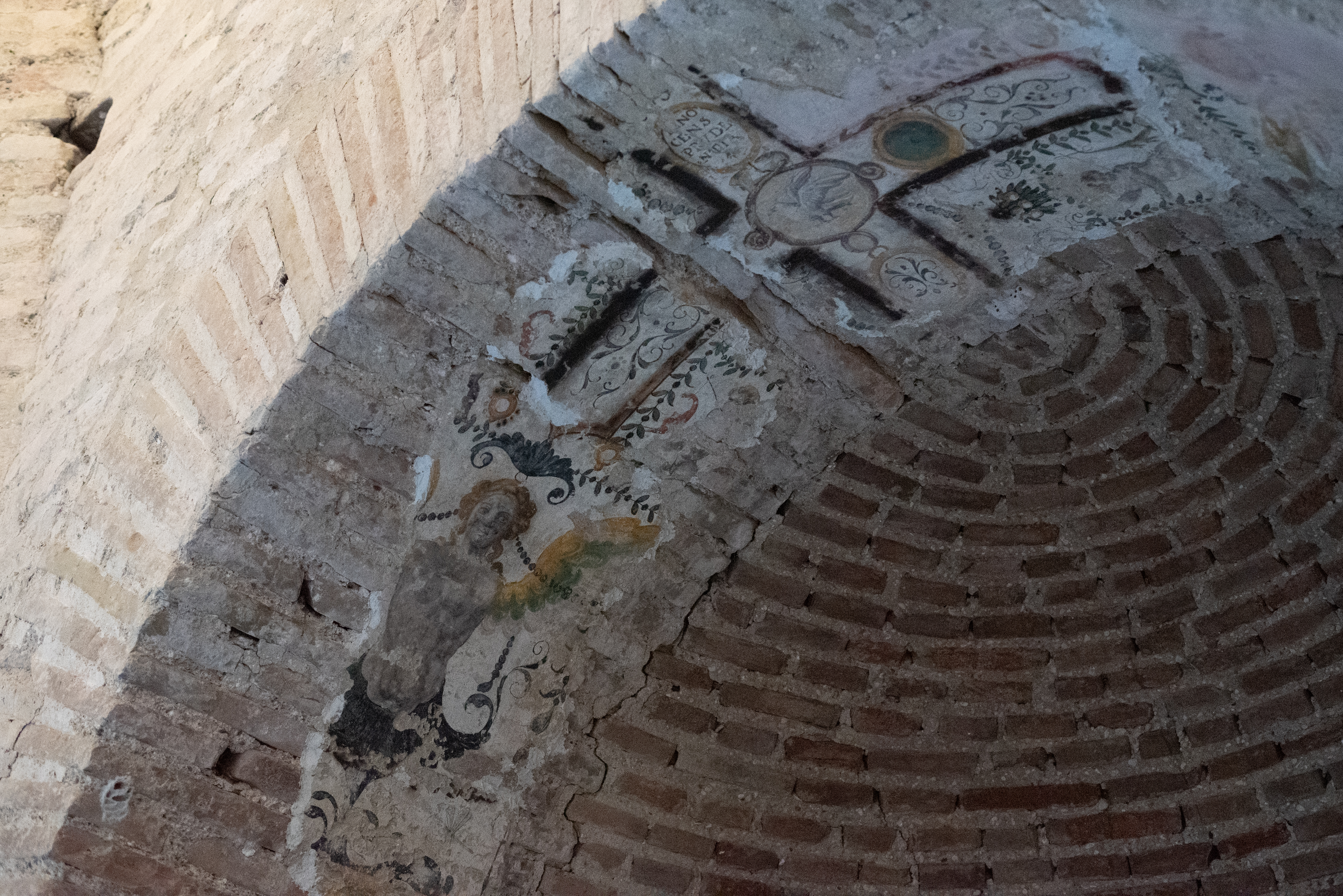
Wall decoration fragments

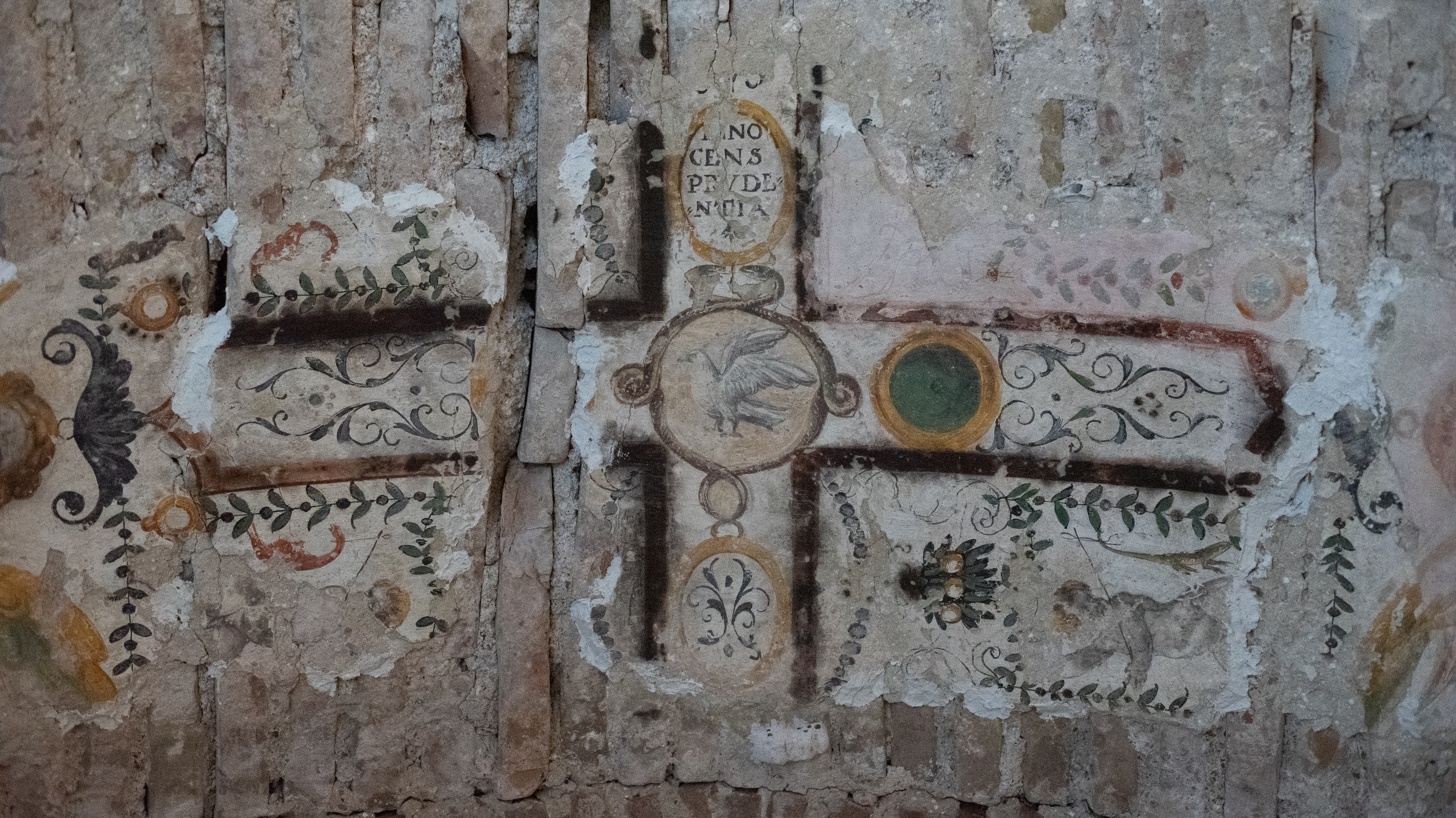
Wall decoration fragments

=== Mosaic description ===
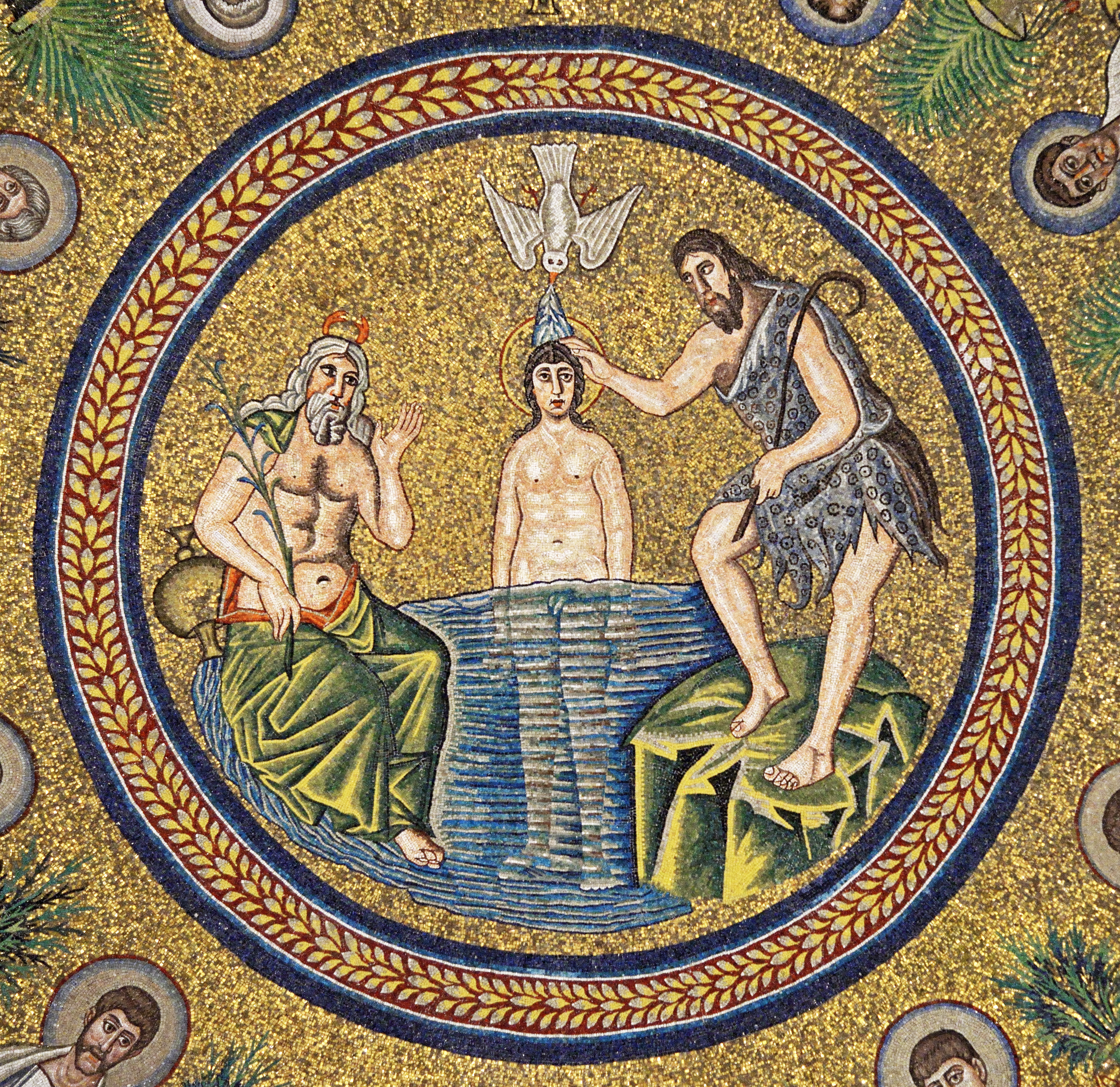
Central roundel details

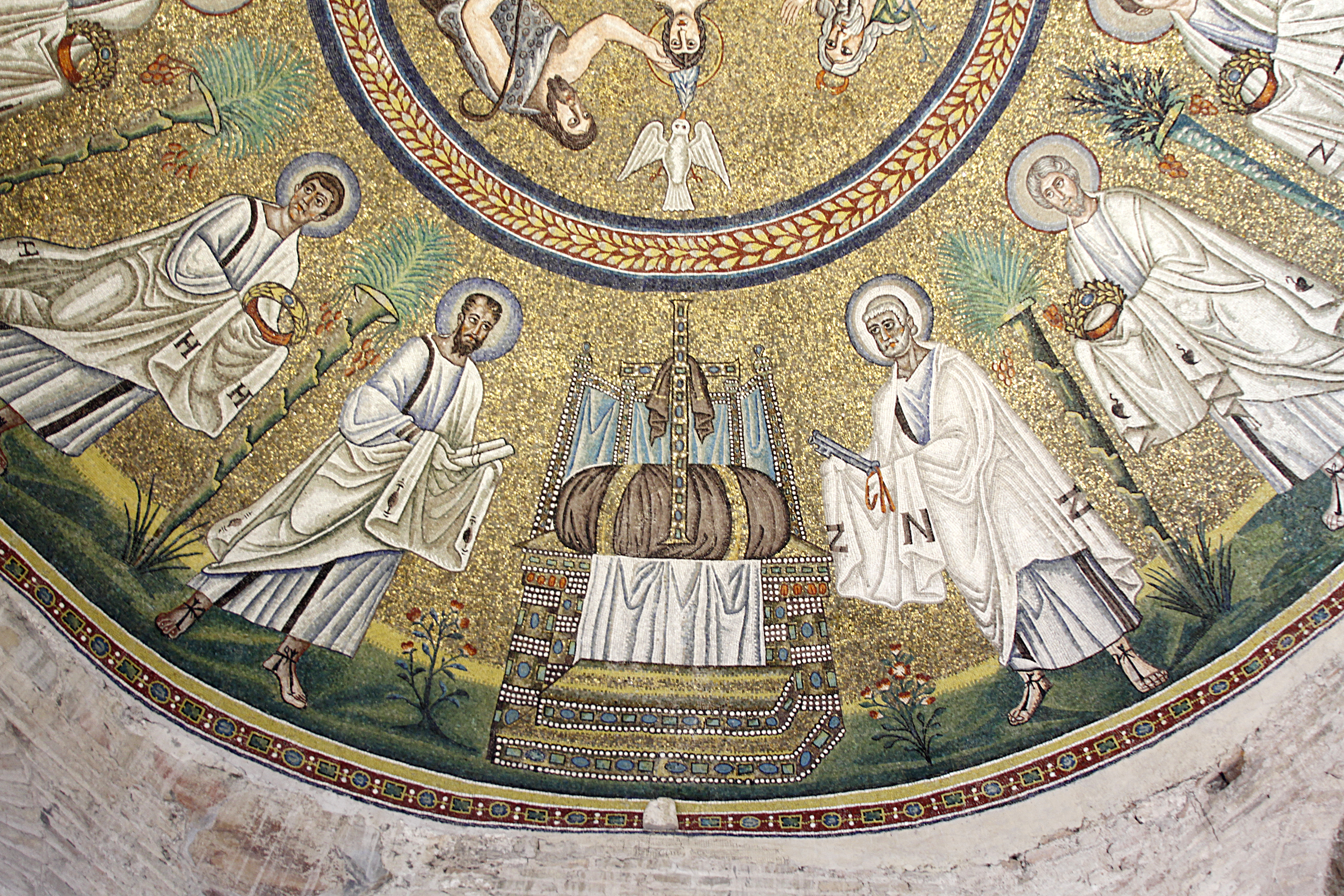
Apostles and throne detail

Inside are four niches and a dome with mosaics, depicting the baptism of Jesus by Saint John the Baptist. Jesus is shown as a beardless, nude, and half-submerged in the River Jordan. A halo sits behind his head. John the Baptist is wearing a leopard skin, and his arm is outstretched, reaching for Jesus, and he rests his hand on Jesus' head. On the left stands a white-haired old man in a green cloak, holding a leather bag, as the personification of the river Jordan, a traditional Greek depiction of river gods. His head is adorned with crayfish claws. This iconography is common in Late Antiquity. He sits suspended in the water, his cloak composed of the same color as the rock the Baptist stands on. Above Jesus is the Holy Spirit, in the form of a dove, spraying lustral water from its beak. Behind the figures in the central roundel is a background of luminous gold.

Below, a double procession of the Apostles, led in separate directions by Saint Peter and Saint Paul circle the dome, meeting at a throne with a jeweled crucifix resting on a purple cushion. Behind their heads, halos are present. Saint Peter carries a key, and Paul carries a scroll. The throne between Saint Peter and Saint Paul symbolizes Christ's power. The key and scroll represent the authority and the power derived from Christ. The Apostles carry jeweled crowns that represent martyrdom. The Apostles are dressed in white, and their faces are nearly indistinguishable from each other.

Additionally, the jeweled crowns may represent God's gifts given to the faithful disciples, the analogy then mirroring the act of baptism; the neophyte has been given the gift of being accepted as God's child now, and their sin washed away. Behind the Apostles gold has been used liberally to compose the background, interrupted by flora that juts from the ground. Beneath their feet is solid ground, unlike Christ, who has nothing underfoot, and the Baptist, who stands on a rock.

It took the artists several years to complete these mosaics, as can be clearly seen from the different colors of the stones used to depict the grass at the feet of the apostles. The designs are quite simple, with a gold ground, typically used in this era to infuse scenes with an ethereal glow. There are no historical records documenting the construction of the Arian Baptistery.

== Similarity to Roman architecture ==
The entire composition is remarkably similar to that of the Orthodox Baptistery of Neon. The walls are bare, but were not always so. During archaeological investigations, some 170 kilograms of tessera were found on the floor. Due to the lack of Arian references, it is believed that the artists who created the mosaics were Catholic Christians, as the Ostrogoths were predominantly goldsmiths and not mosaic artists.

=== Visual differences ===
The mosaics in the Neonian Baptistery and Arian Baptistery both depict baptismal scenes, but there are differences in presentation. In the Arian Baptistery, the Baptist is depicted on Christ's left at the River Jordan and fully emerges from the water. Additionally, in the Arian Baptistery, he is the same size as the adjacent figures. The central medallion is encircled by a single band of red and gold and outlined with twin strips of blue, and the frieze that depicts the twelve apostles is inverted in orientation. The Apostles in the Arian baptistery are clad in simple white and separated by palm trees against a gilded background, whereas the Neonian Baptistery has the Apostles dressed in gold and white, separated by acanthus accompanied by silk drapes against a rich blue background. It is unclear if these differences are due to Arian belief or due to the differing technical skills of the mosaicists because surviving Arian texts are rare.

The central medallion can be interpreted as a sign, as it resembles an emblem, which the observer would face as they stand under the eastern apse. Christ is the focus, his navel the literal core of the mosaic, establishing him as a dominant and powerful iconographic figure. This unique representation contrasts with the Neonian Baptistery roundel, which has a more conservative representation.This differing representation suggests the Arian Baptistery mosaic highlights the bishop's role in the baptism, whereas the Neonian Baptistery focuses on the audience's involvement more. Additionally, the Arian Baptistery depicts a throne between Saint Peter and Saint Paul, something that is missing from the Neonian Baptistery.

=== Theological differences ===
Christ's youthful appearance in the dome mosaic supports Arian Christians' belief that Christ was different than God and, therefore, secondary. The Neonian Baptistery instead depicts Christ as a man in his thirties.

However, most of the small differences in composition, such as John the Baptist's position and opposing orientation of Peter and Paul, lack context due to the lack of surviving Arian texts; it is unknown if these details differed because of theological differences or was a result of the mosaicists. Despite there being so few Arian artworks that have survived, Arian depictions of Christ and the Apostles do not differ significantly. That being said, similar iconography is not indicative of there being no significantly different religious beliefs. After all, these mosaics survived because they were re-consecrated for Christian use, making it impossible to discern the nature of any removed artwork.

== Conversion to Chalcedonian Christianity ==
In 565, after the condemnation of Arianism, this small octagonal brick structure was converted into a Chalcedonian oratory named Santa Maria. The conversion took place sometime between 550 and 570 AD. Eastern Rite monks added a monastery during the period of the Exarchate of Ravenna and further dedicated the structure to Saint Mary in Cosmedin.

Around the year 1700, the structure passed into private hands, and in 1914 it was acquired by the Italian government. Allied bombing during World War II removed surrounding buildings that had encroached upon it, making it possible to examine the exterior in full for the first time. As with other monuments in Ravenna, the original floor is now some 2.3 meters underground.

== Notability ==
The Baptistry is one of the eight structures in Ravenna registered as UNESCO World Heritage Sites.

== See also ==
- Arius
- Ostrogothic Ravenna
- Early medieval domes
- Church architecture
