= Baptistery of Neon =

Roman religious building in Ravenna, Italy

Coordinates: 44°24′56″N 12°11′50″E

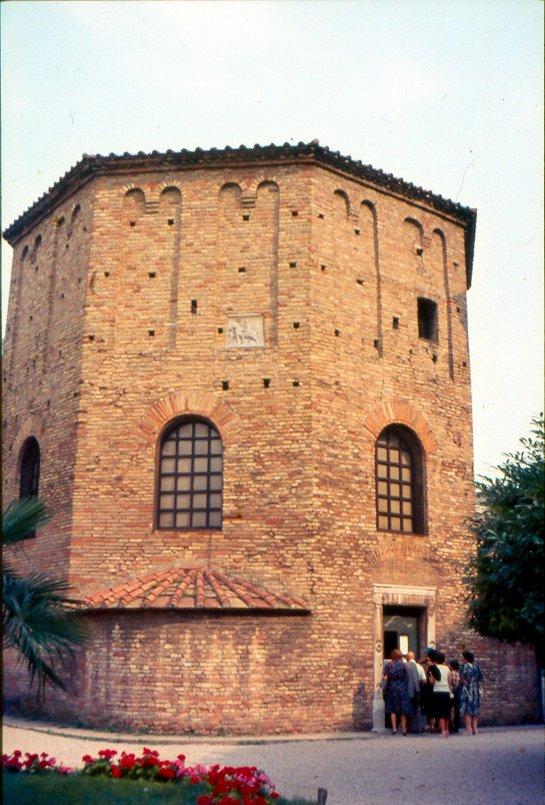
The Baptistry of Neon.

The Baptistery of Neon (Italian: Battistero Neoniano) is a Roman religious building in Ravenna, northeastern Italy. The most ancient monument remaining in the city, it was partly erected on the site of a Roman bath. It is also called the Orthodox Baptistery to distinguish it from the Arian Baptistery constructed on behest of Ostrogothic King Theodoric some 50 years later.

The ceiling mosaic in the Baptistry of Neon

== History ==
The octagonal brick structure was erected during the late Western Roman Empire by Bishop Ursus at the end of the 4th or beginning of the 5th century, as part of his great Basilica (destroyed in 1734). The baptistery was finished by Bishop Neon at the end of the 5th century, at which time the mosaic decorations were added.

== Description ==
The original floor is now some 3 meters underground, so the proper structure and extent of the building can no longer be seen. The octagonal design of the building, employed in virtually all Early Christian baptisteries, symbolizes the seven days of the week plus the Day of the Resurrection and Eternal Life.

The ceiling mosaic depicts John the Baptist baptizing Jesus (depicted with beard) standing waist high in the Jordan River. Zeus, as personification of the Jordan, is also present. A procession of the twelve apostles proceeds around the center mosaic in two directions, ending with Saint Peter meeting Saint Paul.

The Baptistry is one of the eight structures in Ravenna registered as UNESCO World Heritage Sites. According to the ICOMOS evaluation of this patrimony, "this is the finest and most complete surviving example of the early Christian baptistery" which "retains the fluidity in representation of the human figure derived from Greco-Roman art".

== See also ==
- Arian Baptistry
- Ostrogothic Ravenna
- Ancient Roman and Byzantine domes
- Church architecture
