= List of Franciscan saints =

Saints from a group of Catholic religious orders connected with Saint Francis of Assisi

This is a list of saints who were members or affiliated with the Franciscans.

== Order of Friars Minor (OFM) ==
Name	Image	Church Status	Birthplace	Birthdate	Place of Death	Date of Death	Date of Canonization
Francis of Assisi		Founder	Assisi	1181/1182	Assisi	October 3, 1226	July 16, 1228 by Pope Gregory IX
Berard of Carbio and companions Peter, Ortho, Accursius, and Adjutus		Protomartyrs of the Order	Umbria	unknown	Morocco	January 16, 1220	August 7, 1481 by Pope Sixtus IV
Daniel Fasanella and companions Angelus, Samuel, Donulus, Leo, Hugolinus, and Nicholas		Martyrs	Unknown	unknown	Ceuta	October 10, 1227	January 12, 1516 by Pope Leo X
Anthony of Padua		Priest, Doctor of the Crurch	Lisbon	August 5, 1195	Padua	June 13, 1231	May 30, 1232 by Pope Gregory IX
Bonaventure		Cardinal Bishop, Doctor of the Crurch	Civita di Bagnoregio	1221	Lyon	July 15, 1274	April 14, 1482 by Pope Sixtus IV
Louis of Toulouse		Bishop	Brignoles	February 9, 1274	Brignoles	August 19, 1297	April 7, 1317 by Pope John XXII
Nicholas Tavelic and companions Deodatus, Peter, and Stephen		Priest, Missionary, and Martyr	Šibenik	1340	Jerusalem	November 14, 1391	June 21, 1970 by Pope Paul VI
Bernardino of Siena		Priest, Confessor	Massa Marittima	September 8, 1380	L'Aquila	May 20, 1444	May 24, 1450 by Pope Nicholas V
Didacus of Alcalá		Religious, Missionary	San Nicolás del Puerto	1400	Alcalá de Henares	November 12, 1463	July 10, 1588 by Pope Sixtus V
James of the Marches		Preacher, Writer	Monteprandone	1392	Naples	November 28, 1476	1726 by Pope Benedict XIII
Szymon of Lipnica		Priest	Lipnica Murowana	1437	Krakow	July 18, 1482	February 24, 1685 by Pope Innocent XI
John of Capistrano		Confessor	Capestrano	June 24, 1386	Ilok	October 23, 1456	June 4, 1724 by Pope Benedict XIII
Peter of Alcántara		Friar, Mystic	Alcántara	1499	Arenas de San Pedro	October 18, 1562	April 28 1669 by Pope Clement IX
Salvador of Horta		Wonderworker	Santa Coloma de Farners	December 1520	Cagliari	March 18, 1567	April 17 1938 by Pope Pius XI
Nicholas Pieck and companions Peter, Nicasius, Jerome, Anthony Willehad, Francis, Anthony, Theodorus, Cornelius, Godfried		Priests and lay brothers, Martyrs	Various	16th Century	Brielle	July 9, 1572	June 29, 1867 by Pope Pius IX
Benedict of Palermo		Religious, confessor	San Fratello	1526	Palermo	April 4, 1589	May 24, 1807 by Pope Pius XII
Paschal Baylón		Religious	Torrehermosa	May 16, 1540	Villarreal	May 17, 1592	October 16, 1690 by Pope Alexander VIII
Pedro Bautista Blasquez and companions Martin, Philip, Francisco Blanco, Francisco de San Miguel, and Gonsalvo		Missionaries, Martyrs	Various	Various	Nagasaki	February 5, 1597	June 8, 1862 by Pope Pius IX
John Jones		Martyr	Clynnog Fawr	1530	Southwark	July 12, 1598	October 25, 1970 by Pope Paul VI
Francis Solanus		Missionary	Montilla	March 10, 1549	Lima	July 14, 1610	December 27, 1726 by Pope Benedict XIII
Humilis of Bisignano		Religious	Bisignano	August 26, 1582	Bisignano	November 26, 1637	May 19, 2002 by Pope John Paul II
Charles of Sezze		Religious	Sezze	October 19, 1613	Rome	January 6, 1670	April 12, 1959 by Pope John XXIII
John Wall		Martyr	Preston, Lancashire	1620	Worcester	August 22, 1679	October 25, 1970 by Pope Paul VI
Pacificus of San Severino		Priest	San Severino Marche	March 1, 1653	San Severino Marche	September 24, 1721	May 26, 1839 by Pope Pope Gregory XVI
Tommaso da Cori		Priest	Cori, Lazio	June 4, 1665	Bellegra	January 11, 1729	November 21, 1999 by Pope John Paul II
John Joseph of the Cross		Priest	Ischia	August 15, 1654	Ischia	March 5, 1739	May 26, 1839 by Pope Gregory XVI
Theophilus of Corte		Priest	Corte, Haute-Corse	October 30, 1676	Corte, Haute-Corse	June 17, 1740	June 29, 1930 by Pope Pius XI
Leonard of Port Maurice		Priest	Porto Maurizio	December 20, 1678	Porto Maurizio	November 26, 1751	June 29, 1867 by Pope Pius IX
Junípero Serra		Priest, Missionary	Petra, Spain	November 24, 1713	Mission San Carlos Borromeo de Carmelo	August 28, 1784	September 15, 2015 by Pope Francis
Egidio Maria of Saint Joseph		Religious	Taranto	November 16, 1729	Naples	February 7, 1812	June 2, 1996 by Pope John Paul II
Antonio de Sant'Anna Galvao		Priest	Guaratinguetá	May 13, 1739	São Paulo	December 23, 1822	May 11, 2007 by Pope Benedict XVI
Manuel Ruiz Lopez and companions Carmelo, Nicanor, Nicolas, Pedro, Engelbert, Francisco, and Juan		Priests and Religious, Martyrs	Various	Various	Damascus	July 10, 1860	October 20, 2024 by Pope Francis
Ludovico of Casoria		Priest	Naples	March 11, 1814	Naples	March 30, 1885	November 23, 2014 by Pope Francis
John of Triora		Priest, Missionary, Martyr	Unknown	1760	Changsha	1816	October 1, 2000 by Pope John Paul II
Gregorio Grassi and companions Francis, Elias, Theodoric, Andrew, Anthony, Joseph Mary, and Cesidio		Bishops, Priests, Religious, Missionaries and Martyrs	Various	Various	Shanxi and Hunan	July 4-9, 1900	October 1, 2000 by Pope John Paul II

== Order of Friars Minor Conventual (OFM Conv) ==
Name	Image	Church Status	Birthplace	Birthdate	Place of Death	Date of Death	Date of Canonization
Peter de Regalado		Religious, reformer	Valladolid	1390	Spain	March 30, 1456	June 29, 1746 by Pope Benedict XIV
John of Dukla		Priest	Dukla	1414	Lviv	1484	June 10, 1997 by Pope John Paul II
Joseph of Cupertino		Confessor, Mystic	Copertino	June 17, 1603	Osimo	September 18, 1663	July 16, 1767 by Pope Clement XIII
Francis Fasani		Confessor, Mystic	Lucera	August 6, 1681	Lucera	November 29, 1742	April 13, 1986 by Pope John Paul II
Maximilian Kolbe		Priest, Missionary, Martyr	Zduńska Wola	January 8, 1894	Auschwitz-Birkenau	August 14, 1941	October 10, 1982 by Pope John Paul II

== Order of Friars Minor Capuchin (OFM Cap) ==
Name	Image	Church Status	Birthplace	Birthdate	Place of Death	Date of Death	Date of Canonization
Felix of Cantalice		Religious	Cantalice	May 18, 1515	Rome	May 18, 1587	May 22, 1712 by Pope Clement XI
Seraphin of Montegranaro		Religious	Montegranaro	1540	Ascoli Piceno	October 12, 1604	July 16, 1767 by Pope Clement XIII
Joseph of Leonessa		Religious, Martyr	Leonessa	January 8, 1556	Amatrice	February 4, 1612	June 29, 1746 by Pope Benedict XIV
Lawrence of Brindisi		Priest, Doctor of the Church	Brindisi	July 22, 1559	Lisbon	July 22, 1619	December 8, 1881 by Pope Leo XIII
Fidelis of Sigmaringen		Martyr	Sigmaringen	1577	Grüsch	April 24, 1622	June 29, 1746 by Pope Benedict XIV
Bernard of Corleone		Religious	Corleone	February 6, 1605	Palermo	January 12, 1667	June 10, 2001 by Pope John Paul II
Luca Antonio Falcone		Priest	Acri	October 19, 1669	Acri	October 30, 1739	October 15, 2017 by Pope Francis
Crispin of Viterbo		Religious	Viterbo	November 13, 1668	Rome	May 19, 1750	June 20, 1982 by Pope John Paul II
Ignatius of Santhià		Priest	Santhià	June 5, 1686	Turin	September 22, 1770	May 19, 2002 by Pope John Paul II
Ignatius of Laconi		Religious	Laconi	December 10, 1701	Cagliari	May 11, 1781	October 21, 1951 by Pope Pius XII
Felix of Nicosia		Religious	Nicosia, Sicily	November 5, 1715	Nicosia, Sicily	May 31, 1787	October 23, 2005 by Pope Benedict XVI
Francesco Maria da Camporosso		Religious	Camporosso	December 27, 1804	Genoa	September 17, 1866	December 9, 1962 by Pope John XXIII
Conrad of Parzham		Religious	Bad Griesbach	December 22, 1818	Altötting	April 21, 1894	May 20, 1934 by Pope Pius XI
Leopold Mandić		Priest	Herceg Novi	May 12, 1866	Padua	July 30, 1942	October 16, 1983 by Pope John Paul II
Pio of Pietrelcina		Priest and Mystic	Pietrelcina	May 25, 1887	San Giovanni Rotondo	September 23, 1968	June 16, 2002 by Pope John Paul II

== Order of Poor Clares (O.S.C.) ==
Name	Image	Church Status	Birthplace	Birthdate	Place of Death	Date of Death	Date of Canonization
Clare of Assisi		Virgin, Foundress	Assisi	July 16, 1194	Assisi	August 11, 1253	September 26, 1255 by Pope Alexander IV
Agnes of Assisi		Virgin, Abbess	Assisi	1197/1198	Assisi	November 16, 1253	1753 by Pope Benedict XIV
Agnes of Bohemia		Virgin, Princess, Abbess	Prague	January 20, 1211	Prague	March 2, 1282	November 12, 1989 by Pope John Paul II
Cunegunda of Poland		Princess, Abbess	Esztergom	March 5, 1224	Stary Sącz	July 24, 1292	June 16, 1999 by Pope John Paul II
Colette of Corbie		Abbess and Foundress, Colettine Poor Clares	Corbie	January 13, 1381	Ghent	March 6, 1447	May 24, 1807 by Pope Pius VII
Catherine of Bologna		Virgin	Bologna	September 8, 1413	Bologna	March 9, 1463	May 22, 1712 by Pope Clement VII
Eustochia Smeralda Calafato		Abbess	Messina	March 25, 1434	Messina	January 20, 1485	June 11, 1988 by Pope John Paul II
Camilla Battista da Varano		Princess, Abbess	Camerino	April 9, 1458	Camerino	May 31, 1524	October 17, 2010 by Pope Benedict XVI
Veronica Giuliani		Virgin and Mystic, Capuchin Poor Clares	Mercatello sul Metauro	December 27, 1660	Città di Castello	July 9, 1727	May 26, 1839 by Pope Gregory XVI
Beatrice of Silva		Virgin, foundress of the Conceptionist Poor Clares	Campo Maior	1424	Toledo	August 16, 1492	October 3, 1976 by Pope Paul VI

== Third Order of St. Francis and Secular Franciscan Order (T.O.S.F. and O.F.S.) ==
Name	Image	Church Status	Birthplace	Birthdate	Place of Death	Date of Death	Date of Canonization
Elizabeth of Hungary		Princess, Patroness	Pozsony	July 7, 1207	Marburg	November 17, 1231	May 27, 1235 by Pope Gregory IX
Rose of Viterbo		Virgin	Viterbo	1233	Viterbo	March 6, 1251	1457 by Pope Callixtus III
Ferdinand III of Castile		King	Monastery of Valparaiso, Peleas de Arriba	1199/1201	Seville	May 30, 1252	February 4, 1671 by Pope Clement X
Louis IX of France		King, Confessor, Patron	Poissy	April 25, 1214	Tunis	August 25, 1270	July 11, 1297 by Pope Boniface VIII
Margaret of Cortona		Tender of Sick, Monastic, Penitent	Laviano	1247	Cortona	February 22, 1297	May 16, 1728 by Pope Benedict XIII
Amato Ronconi		Layman	Saludecio	1226	Saludecio	May 8, 1292	November 23, 2014 by Pope Francis
Ivo of Kermartin		Priest	Kermartin	October 17, 1253	Louannec	May 19, 1303	June 1357 by Pope Clement VII
Angela of Foligno		Mystic	Foligno	1248	Foligno	January 3, 1309	October 9, 2013 (equivalent canonization) by Pope Francis
Elzéar of Sabran		Ruler, Diplomat, Military Leader	Provence	1285	Paris	September 27, 1323	April 15, 1369 by Pope Urban V
Elizabeth of Portugal		Queen consort	Zaragoza	January 4, 1271	Alentejo	July 4, 1336	June 24, 1626 by Pope Urban VIII
Conrad of Piacenza		Confessor, Hermit	Calendasco	1290	Netum	February 19, 1351	June 2, 1625 by Pope Urban VIII
Roch		Confessor	Montpellier	1348	Voghera	August 15/16 , 1376/79	Added to the Roman Martyrology by Pope Gregory XIV out of popular fervor
Thomas More		Lawyer, Martyr	City of London	February 7, 1478	Tower Hill	July 6, 1535	May 19, 1935 by Pope Pius XI
Charles Borromeo		Cardinal, Archbishop, Confessor	Arona	October 2, 1538	Milan	November 3, 1584	November 1, 1610 by Pope Paul V
17 Japanese Franciscan Tertiaries (Anthony Dainan, Bonaventure of Miyako, Cosmas Takeya, Francisco of Nagasaki, Francis Kichi, Gabriel de Duisco, Joachim Sakakibara, John Kisaka, Leo Karasumaru, Louis Ibaraki, Matthias of Miyako, Michael Kozaki, Paul Ibaraki, Paul Suzuki, Peter Sukejirō, Thomas Kozaki, Thomas Danki)		Laymen	various	various	Nagasaki	February 5, 1597	
Hyacintha Mariscotti		Religious	Vignanello	March 16, 1585	Viterbo	January 30, 1640	May 14, 1807 by Pope Pius VII
Mariana de Jesús de Paredes		Virgin	Quito	October 31, 1618	Quito	May 26, 1645	July 9, 1950 by Pope Pius XII
Maria Crescentia Höss		Virgin	Kaufbeuren	October 20, 1682	Kaufbeuren	April 5, 1744	November 25, 2001 by Pope John Paul II
Benedict Joseph Labre		Layman	Amettes	March 26, 1748	Rome	April 16, 1783	December 8, 1881 y Pope Leo XIII
Mary Frances of the Five Wounds		Virgin	Naples	March 25, 1715	Naples	October 7, 1791	June 29, 1867 by Pope Pius IX
John Vianney		Priest, Confessor	Dardilly	May 8, 1786	Ars-sur-Formans	August 4, 1859	May 31, 1925 by Pope Pius IX
Joseph Cafasso		Priest	Castelnuovo d'Asti	January 15, 1811	Turin	June 23, 1860	June 22, 1947 by Pope Pius XII
Marguerite Bays		Virgin, Mystic	Siviriez	September 8, 1815	Siviriez	June 27, 1879	October 13, 2019 by Pope Francis
Seven martyrs from the Franciscan Missionaries of Mary (Mary Hermina of Jesus, Marie de la Paix Giuliani, Maria Chiara Nanetti, Marie of Saint Natalie, Marie of Saint Just, Marie-Adolphine, Mary Amandina)		Nuns	Various	Various	Taiyuan	July 9, 1900	October 1, 2000 by Pope John Paul II
Eleven Chinese Franciscan Tertiaries (John Zhang Huan, Patrick Dong Bodi, John Wang Rui, Philip Zhang Zhihe, John Zhang Jingguang, Simon Qin Chunfu, Peter Wu Anbang, Chi Zhuzi, Francis Zhang Rong, Matthew Feng De, Peter Zhang Banniu)		Seminarians, laymen	Various	Various	Taiyuan	July 9, 1900	October 1, 2000 by Pope John Paul II
Pope Pius X		Pope	Riese	June 2, 1835	Rome	August 20, 1914	May 29, 1954 by Pope Pius XII
Albert Chmielowski		Religious	Igołomia	Augus 20, 1845	Kraków	December 25, 1916	November 12, 1989 by Pope John Paul II
Marianne Cope		Virgin	Heppenheim	January 23, 1838	Kalaupapa	August 9, 1918	October 21, 2012 by Pope Benedict XVI
José Gregorio Hernández		Layman, physician	Isnotú	October 26, 1864	Caracas	June 29, 1919	October 19, 2025 by Pope Leo XIV
Carolina Santocanale		Religious	Palermo	October 2, 1852	Palermo	January 27, 1923	May 15, 2022 by Pope Francis
Pope John XXIII		Pope	Sotto il Monte	November 25, 1881	Vatican City	June 3, 1963	April 27, 2014 by Pope Francis
Dulce de Souza Lopes Pontes		Missionary	Salvador, Bahia	May 26, 1914	Salvador, Bahia	March 13, 1992	October 13, 2019 by Pope Francis

== Tertiary Franciscans who moved to or founded other Orders ==
Name	Image	Church Status	Birthplace	Birthdate	Place of Death	Date of Death	Date of Canonization
Clare of Montefalco		Nun, Abbess (Tertiary Franciscan before becoming an Augustinian nun)	Montefalco	1268	Montefalco	August 18, 1308	December 8, 1881 by Pope Leo XIII
Bridget of Sweden		Widow, Mystic, Foundress of the Bridgettines	Uppland	1304	Rome	July 23, 1373	October 7, 1391 by Pope
Frances of Rome		Mystic, Confessor, Patroness of Benedictine Oblates	Rome	1384	Rome	March 9, 1440	1608 by Pope Paul V
Joan of Valois		Queen consort, foundress of the Order of the Annunciation of the Blessed Virgin Mary	Nogent-le-Roi	April 23, 1464	Bourges	February 4, 1505	May 28, 1950 by Pope Pius XII
Angela Merici		Virgin, foundress of the Ursulines	Desenzano del Garda	March 21, 1474	Brescia	January 27, 1540	May 24, 1807 by Pope Pius VII
Peter of Saint Joseph de Betancur		Religious, missionary, founder of the Order of Our Lady of Bethlehem	Vilaflor	March 21, 1626	Antigua Guatemala	April 25, 1667	July 30, 2002 by Pope John Paul II
Giuseppe Benedetto Cottolengo		Confessor, founder of Little House of Divine Providence	Bra	May 3, 1786	Chieri	April 30, 1842	March 19, 1934 by Pope Pius XI
Joaquina Vedruna de Mas		Religious, foundress of Carmelite Sisters of Charity	Vic	April 17, 1783	Barcelona	August 28, 1854	April 12, 1959 by Pope John XXIII
Vincenza Gerosa		Religious, co-foundress of the Sisters of Charity of Lovere	Lovere	October 29, 1784	Lovere	June 28, 1847	May 18, 1950 by Pope Pius XII
Vincent Pallotti		Priest, founder of the Pious Society of Missions	Rome	April 21, 1795	Rome	January 22, 1850	January 20, 1963 by Pope John XXIII
Emily de Vialar		Nun, foundress of Sisters of St. Joseph of the Apparition	Gaillac	September 12, 1797	Marseille	August 24, 1856	June 24, 1951 by Pope Pius XII
Maria Giuseppa Rossello		Virgin, foundress of the Daughters of Our Lady of Mercy	Albissola Marina	May 27, 1811	Savona	December 7, 1880	June 12, 1949 by Pope Pius XII
John Bosco		Priest, confessor, founder of the Salesians of Don Bosco	Castelnuovo d'Asti	August 16, 1815	Turin	January 31, 1888	April 1, 1934 by Pope Pius XI
Luigi Guanella		Priest, founder of the Daughters of Saint Mary of Providence and the Servants of Charity	Campodolcino	December 19, 1842	Como	October 24, 1915	October 23, 2011 by Pope Benedict XVI
Frances Xavier Cabrini		Virgin, religious, foundress of the Missionary Sisters of the Sacred Heart of Jesus	Sant'Angelo Lodigiano	July 15, 1850	Chicago	December 22, 1917	July 7, 1946 by Pope Pius XII
