= Maria Chiara Nanetti =

Italian religious sister, martyr and saint, died 1900

Saint Maria Chiara Nanetti

Martyr
- Born: Clelia Nanetti; 9 January 1872; Occhiobello, Rovigo, Italy
- Died: 9 July 1900 (age 28); Taiyuan, China
- Beatified: 24 November 1946 by Pope Pius XII
- Canonized: 1 October 2000, Rome by Pope John Paul II
- Feast: 9 July as one of the Martyr Saints of China

Saint Maria Chiara Nanetti or Mary Clare (1872-1900, born Clelia Nanetti) was an Italian religious sister who died for her faith in China during the Boxer Rebellion and was canonised in 2000. She is one of the group known as the Martyr Saints of China who were canonised by Pope John Paul II 1 October 2000.

== Life ==
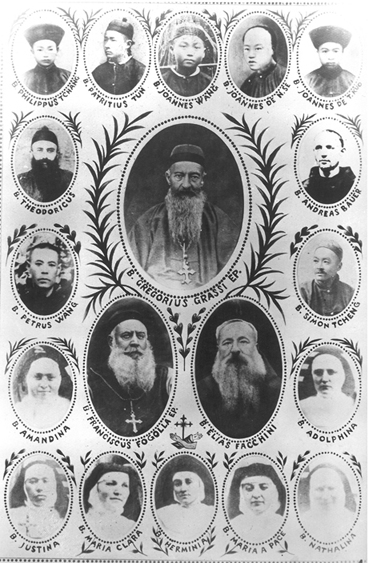
The Franciscan Martyrs of Shanxi

Nanetti was born Clelia Nanetti 9 January 1872 in Occhiobello, Rovigo, Italy and joined the Franciscan Missionaries of Mary on 4 January 1892. She was said to be a keen pupil at school but she only had an elementary education. Her parents resisted her idea of becoming a religious sister, but her brother who was a Franciscan, encouraged her. She started her postulancy on 24 January 1892 and stook the name Maria Chiara when she became a novice in April.

In 1899 she was one of a group of seven sisters from the order who went to Taiyuan, China, arriving on 4 May 1899, to set up an orphanage at the mission there under bishop Gregorio Grassi, at the request of the co-adjutor bishop of Shanxi, Francisco Fagolla, who wanted to found a small hospital and improve the education offered at the orphanage. The other six sisters came from Belgium, France and the Netherlands although Maria della Pace, like Nanetti, was also Italian. One of their tasks was to learn the local language and the customs.

The level of threat to the community rose and on 27 June 1900 the Bishops advised that the sisters should change into local clothes and escape. Marie-Hermine of Jesus as Mother Superior proposed the sisters should not be denied the sacrifice of dying for their faith and they were allowed to take their chances.

On 5 July 1900, during the Boxer Rebellion, the Christians at the mission were ordered to renounce their faith or face death; at 4pm on 9 July the priests, sisters, seminarians and Christian lay workers were all killed, in what is known as the Taiyuan massacre. On hearing the news of the death of the seven sisters, the mission's founder, Mary of the Passion, is reported to have said "now I have seven true Franciscan Missionaries of Mary". Maria Chiara was beatified by Pope Pius XII on 24 November 1946 and canonised by Pope John Paul II on 1 October 2000 as one of a group of 120 Martyr Saints of China. The Franciscan Martyrs of China are remembered on 9 July each year.
