= Marie of Saint Just =

French nun and one of the 120 Martyrs of China

St. Marie of Saint Just
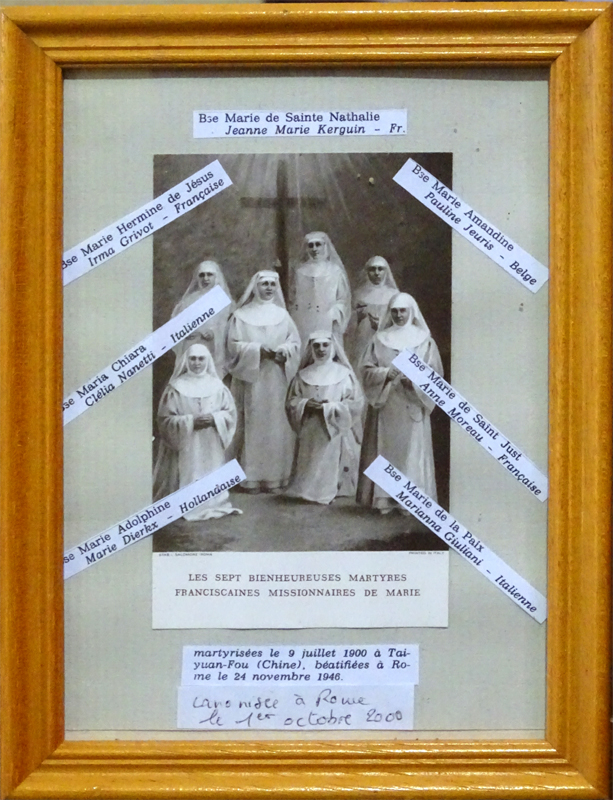

Missionary and Martyr of China
- Born: 9 April 1866; Rouans, Loire-Inférieure, Second French Empire
- Died: 9 July 1900 (aged 34); Taiyuan, Shanxi, Qing China
- Cause of death: Decapitation
- Venerated in: Catholic Church
- Canonized: 1 October 2000 by Pope John Paul II
- Feast: 9 July

Marie of Saint Just, born Anne-Françoise Moreau (9 April 1866 – 9 July 1900) was a French nun in the Franciscan Missionaries of Mary. She was one of the 120 Martyrs of China.

During the Boxer Rebellion, she was killed on 9 July 1900 in Taiyuan. Pope John Paul II canonized her on 1 October 2000.

== Life ==
She was born in 1866.

In 1899 she was one of a group of seven sisters from the order of the Franciscan Missionaries of Mary who went to Taiyuan, China, arriving on 4 May 1899, to help at an orphanage at the mission there under bishop Gregorio Grassi. At the orphanage, which soon cared for 200 children. Their Mother Superior was Marie-Hermine of Jesus.

On 5 July 1900, during the Boxer Rebellion, the Christians at the mission were ordered to renounce their faith or face death; at 16:00 on 9 July the priests, nuns, seminarians and Christian lay workers were all killed, in what is known as the Taiyuan massacre. It is estimated that 250 foreigners died during the Boxer rebellion. Some of these were embassy staff, but most were missionaries. It is thought that 100,000 Chinese people may have died.

Marie of Saint Just was beatified by Pope Pius XII on 24 November 1946 and later canonised by on 1 October 2000.
