= Sant'Egidio in Borgo =

Oratory in Vatican City

Saint Giles in Borgo Sant'Egidio a Borgo (in Italian)
- Location on a map of Vatican City

Religion
- Affiliation: Roman Catholic
- Ecclesiastical or organisational status: Oratory

Location
- Location: Vatican City
- Coordinates: 41°54′15.53″N 012°27′26.19″E

Architecture
- Type: Church

The church of Sant'Egidio in Borgo, ...a Borgo, or ...in Vaticano (Saint Giles in Borgo or at the Vatican), is a Roman Catholic oratory in Vatican City dedicated to Saint Giles.

== History ==
The name of this church appears for the first time in the documents of the thirteenth century, under the name sancti Egidii extra portam Viridariam or extra portam Auream in monte Geretulo or extra portam Viridariam in monte Geretulo. Pope Alexander III conceded the church to the Order of the Holy Sepulchre with the mission to restore the church and its hospital.

Pope Pius XI gave the church to the Franciscan Missionaries of Mary.
