= Martyr Saints of China =

Catholics canonized in 2000

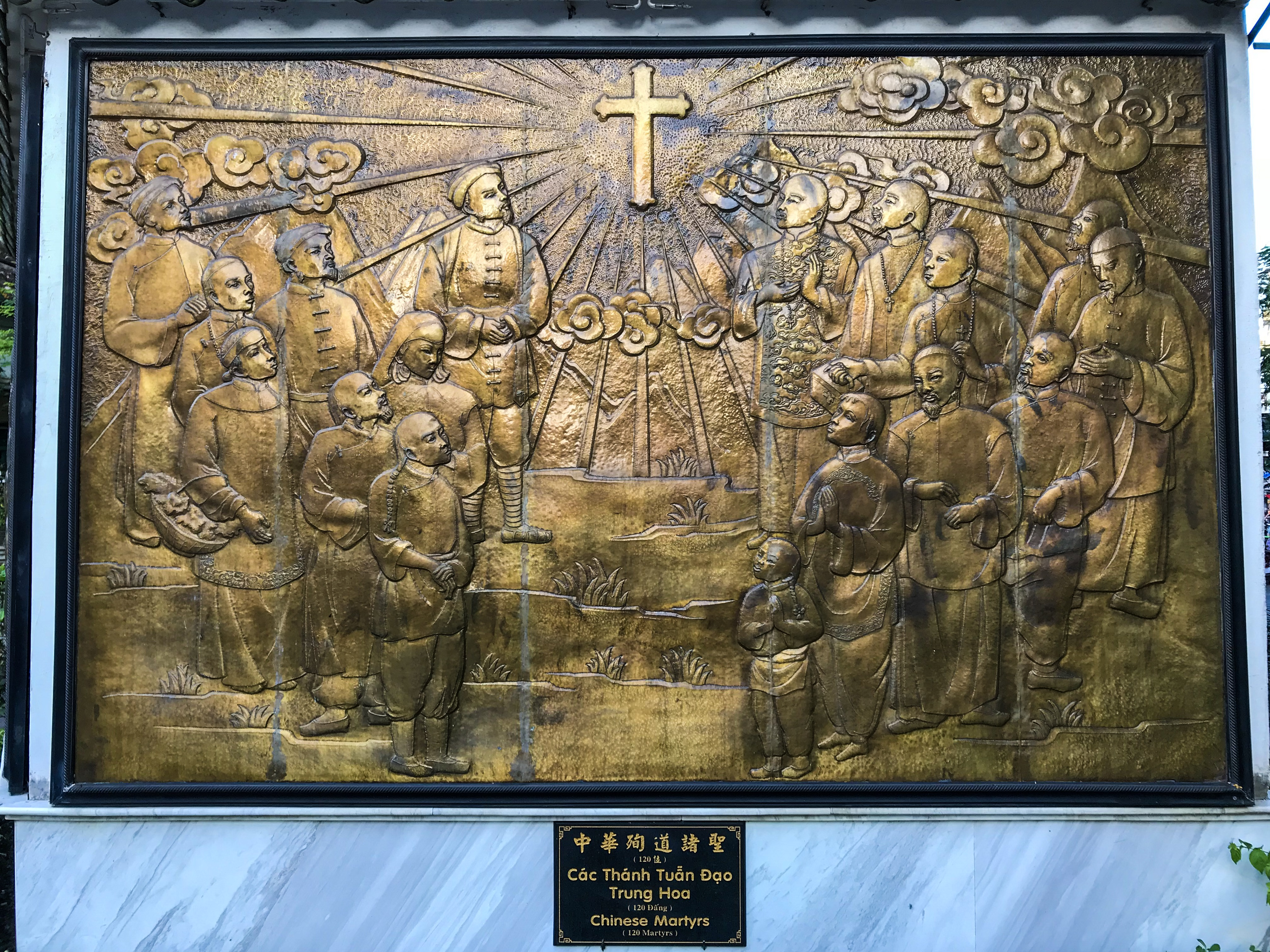
- Memorial plaque at Saint Francis Xavier Church (Ho Chi Minh City, Vietnam)
- Died: 1648–1930, Qing Empire and Republic of China
- Martyred by: Boxer Rebellion
- Venerated in: Catholic Church
- Beatified: by Pope Leo XIII: 5 were beatified on 14 May 1893; 14 were beatified on 27 May 1900 by Pope Pius X: 14 were beatified on 2 May 1909 by Pope Pius XII: 29 were beatified on 24 November 1946; 1 was beatified on 18 February 1951; 56 were beatified on 17 April 1955 by Pope John Paul II: 2 were beatified on 15 May 1983
- Canonized: 1 October 2000, by Pope John Paul II
- Feast: 9 July
- Notable martyrs: Anna Wang; Augustine Zhao Rong; Francisco Fernández de Capillas; Auguste Chapdelaine

Augustine Zhao Rong and his Companions
- Traditional Chinese: 中華殉道聖人
- Simplified Chinese: 中华殉道圣人
- Literal meaning: Martyr Saints of China
Transcriptions
Standard Mandarin
- Hanyu Pinyin: Zhōnghuá xùndào shèngrén

Alternative Chinese name
- Traditional Chinese: 中華殉道諸聖
- Simplified Chinese: 中华殉道诸圣
- Literal meaning: Martyrs of China
Transcriptions
Standard Mandarin
- Hanyu Pinyin: Zhōnghuá xùndào zhū shèng

The Martyr Saints of China, or Augustine Zhao Rong and his Companions, are 120 saints of the Catholic Church. The 87 Chinese Catholics and 33 Western missionaries from the mid-17th century to 1930 were martyred because of their ministry and, in some cases, for their refusal to apostatize.

Many died in the Boxer Rebellion of 1900 and 1901, in which anti-Western peasant rebels slaughtered 30,000 Chinese converts to Christianity along with missionaries and other foreigners.

The martyrs are remembered with an optional memorial on 9 July.

== The 17th and 18th centuries ==
On 15 January 1648, during the Manchu Invasion to Ming China, Manchu Tatars, invaded the region of Fujian and captured Francisco Fernández de Capillas, a Dominican priest aged 40. After having imprisoned and tortured him, they beheaded him while he recited with others the Sorrowful Mysteries of the Rosary. Father de Capillas has since been recognised by the Holy See as the protomartyr of China.

After the first wave of missionary activities in China during the late Ming to early Qing dynasties, the Qing government officially banned Catholicism (Protestantism was considered outlawed by the same decree, as it was linked to Catholicism) in 1724 and lumped it together with other 'perverse sects and sinister doctrines' in Chinese folk religion.

While Catholicism continued to exist and increase many-fold in areas beyond the government's control (Sichuan notably; see "Catholic Church in Sichuan"), and many Chinese Christians fled the persecution to go to port cities in Guangdong or to The Philippines, where many translations of Christian works into Chinese occurred during this period, there were also many missionaries who broke the law and secretly entered the forbidden mainland territory. They eluded Chinese patrol boats on the rivers and coasts; however, some of them were caught and put to death.

Towards the middle of the 18th century five Spanish missionaries, who had carried out their activity between 1715 and 1747, were put to death as a result of a new wave of persecution that started in 1729 and broke out again in 1746. This was in the epoch of the Yongzheng Emperor and of his successor, the Qianlong Emperor.

1. Peter Sanz, O.P., bishop, was martyred on 26 May 1747, in Fuzhou.

All four of the following were killed on 28 October 1748:

1. Francis Serrano, O.P., vicar apostolic and bishop-elect
2. Joachim Royo, O.P., priest
3. John Alcober, O.P., priest
4. Francis Diaz, O.P., priest.

== Early 19th-century martyrdoms ==
A new period of persecution in regard to the Christian religion occurred in the 19th century.

While Catholicism had been authorised by some Chinese emperors in the preceding centuries, the Jiaqing Emperor published, instead, numerous and severe decrees against it. The first was issued in 1805. Two edicts of 1811 were directed against those among the Chinese who were studying to receive sacred orders, and against priests who were propagating the Christian religion. A decree of 1813 exonerated voluntary apostates from every chastisement—that is, Christians who spontaneously declared that they would abandon their faith—but all others were to be dealt with harshly.

In this period the following underwent martyrdom:

1. Peter Wu, a Chinese lay catechist. Born of a pagan family, he received baptism in 1796 and passed the rest of his life proclaiming the truth of the Christian religion. All attempts to make him apostatize were in vain. The sentence having been pronounced against him, he was strangled on 7 November 1814.
2. Joseph Zhang Dapeng, a lay catechist, and a merchant. Baptized in 1800, he had become the heart of the mission in the city of Guiyang. He was imprisoned, and then strangled to death on 12 March 1815.

Also in the same year, there came two other decrees, with which approval was given to the conduct of the Viceroy of Sichuan who had beheaded Monsignor Dufresse, of the Paris Foreign Missions Society, and some Chinese Christians. As a result, there was a worsening of the persecution.

The following martyrs belong to this period:

1. Gabriel-Taurin Dufresse, M.E.P., Bishop. He was arrested on 18 May 1815, taken to Chengdu, condemned, and executed on 14 September 1815.
2. Augustine Zhao Rong, a Chinese diocesan priest. Having first been one of the soldiers who had escorted Monsignor Dufresse from Chengdu to Beijing, he was moved by his patience and had then asked to be numbered among the neophytes. Once baptized, he was sent to the seminary and then ordained a priest. Arrested, he was tortured and died in 1815.
3. John of Triora, O.F.M., priest. Put in prison together with others in the summer of 1815, he was then condemned to death, and strangled on 7 February 1816.
4. Joseph Yuan, a Chinese diocesan priest. Having heard Monsignor Dufresse speak of the Christian faith, he was overcome by its beauty and then became an exemplary neophyte. Later, he was ordained a priest and, as such, was dedicated to evangelisation in various districts. He was arrested in August 1816, condemned to be strangled, and was killed in this way on 24 June 1817.
5. Paul Liu Hanzuo, a Chinese diocesan priest, killed in 1819.
6. Francis Regis Clet of the Congregation of the Mission (Vincentians). After obtaining permission to go to the missions in China, he embarked for the Orient in 1791. Having reached there, for 30 years he spent a life of missionary sacrifice. Upheld by an untiring zeal, he evangelised three immense Chinese provinces: Jiangxi, Hubei, Hunan. Betrayed by a Christian, he was arrested and thrown into prison where he underwent atrocious tortures. Following sentence by the Jiaqing Emperor he was killed by strangling on 17 February 1820.
7. Thaddeus Liu, a Chinese diocesan priest. He refused to apostatize, saying that he was a priest and wanted to be faithful to the religion that he had preached. Condemned to death, he was strangled on 30 November 1823.
8. Peter Liu, a Chinese lay catechist. He was arrested in 1814 and condemned to exile in Tartary, where he remained for almost twenty years. Returning to his homeland he was again arrested, and was strangled on 17 May 1834.
9. Joachim Ho, a Chinese lay catechist. He was baptised at the age of about twenty years. In the great persecution of 1814 he had been taken with many others of the faithful and subjected to cruel torture. Sent into exile in Tartary, he remained there for almost twenty years. Returning to his homeland he was arrested again and refused to apostatize. Following that, and the death sentence having been confirmed by the Emperor, he was strangled on 9 July 1839.
10. John Gabriel Perboyre, C.M., entered the Vincentians as a high school student. The death of his younger brother, also a Vincentian priest, moved his superiors to allow him to take his brother's place, arriving in China in 1835. Despite poor health, he served the poverty-stricken residents of Hubei. Arrested during a revival of anti-Christian persecution, upon imperial edict, he was strangled to death in 1840.
11. Augustus Chapdelaine, M.E.P., a priest of the Diocese of Coutances. He entered the Seminary of the Paris Foreign Missions Society, and embarked for China in 1852. He arrived in Guangxi at the end of 1854. Arrested in 1856, he was tortured, condemned to death, and died in February 1856.
12. Lawrence Bai Xiaoman, a Chinese layman, and an unassuming worker. He joined Blessed Chapdelaine in the refuge that was given to the missionary and was arrested with him and brought before the tribunal. Nothing could make him renounce his religious beliefs. He was beheaded on 25 February 1856.
13. Agnes Cao Guiying, a widow, born into an old Christian family. Being dedicated to the instruction of young girls who had recently been converted by Blessed Chapdelaine, she was arrested and condemned to death in prison. She was executed on 1 March 1856.

== Martyrs of Maokou and Guizhou ==
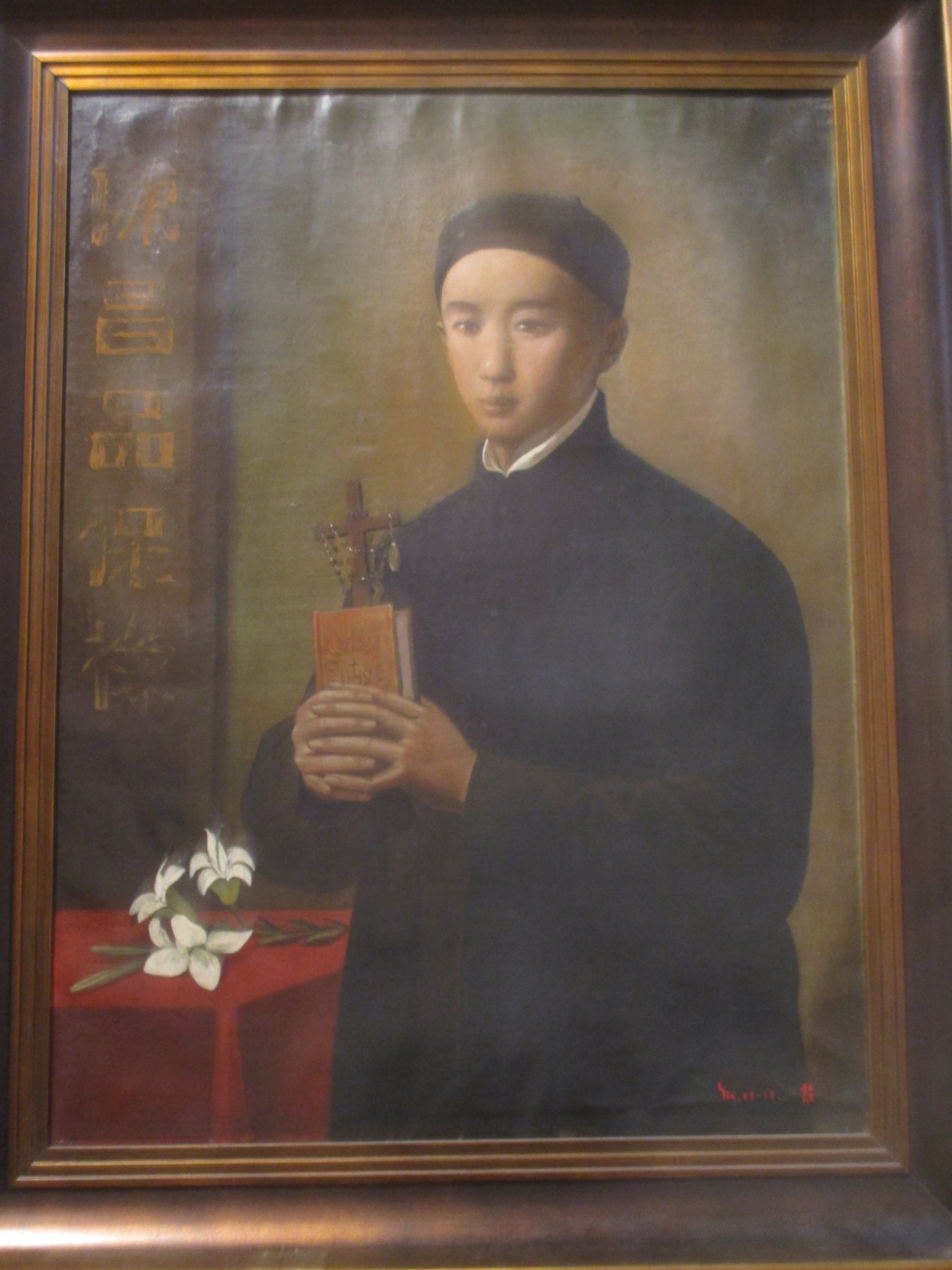
Saint Paul Chen

Three catechists, known as the Martyrs of Maokou (in the province of Guizhou) were killed on 28 January 1858, by order of the officials in Maokou:

1. Jerome Lu Tingmei (catechist)
2. Laurence Wang Bing (catechist)
3. Agatha Lin

All three had been called on to renounce the Christian religion and having refused to do so were condemned to be beheaded.

In Guizhou, two seminarians and two lay people, one of whom was a farmer, the other a widow who worked as a cook in the seminary, suffered martyrdom together on 29 July 1861. They are known as the Martyrs of Qingyanzhen (Guizhou):

1. Joseph Zhang Wenlan, seminarian
2. Paul Chen Changpin, seminarian
3. John Baptist Luo Tingyin, layman
4. Martha Wang Luo Mande, laywoman

In the following year, on 18 and 19 February 1862, another five people died for Christ. They are known as the Martyrs of Guizhou.

1. Jean-Pierre Néel, a priest of the Paris Foreign Missions Society,
2. Martin Wu Xuesheng, lay catechist,
3. John Zhang Tianshen, lay catechist,
4. John Chen Xianheng, lay catechist,
5. Lucy Yi Zhenmei, lay catechist.

== 19th-century social and political developments ==
In June 1840, Qing China was forced to open the borders and afforded multiple concessions to European Christian missions after the First Opium War, including allowing the Chinese to follow the Catholic religion and restoring the property confiscated in 1724. The 1844 treaty also allowed for missionaries to come to China, provided if they come to the treaty ports opened to Europeans.

The subsequent Taiping Rebellion significantly worsened the image of Christianity in China. Hong Xiuquan, the rebel leader, claimed to be a Christian and brother of Jesus who received a special mission from God to fight evil and usher in a period of peace. Hong and his followers achieved considerable success in taking control of a large territory, and destroyed many Buddhist and Taoist shrines, temples to local divinities and opposed Chinese folk religion. The rebellion was one of the bloodiest armed conflicts in human history, accounting for an estimated number of 20–30 million deaths. As missionary activities became increasingly associated with European imperialism, violence against missionaries arose.

In 1856, the death of missionary Auguste Chapdelaine triggered a French military expedition during the Second Opium War, which China lost. The resulting Treaty of Tientsin, granted Christian missionaries the freedom of movement throughout China and the right to land ownership.

As missionaries started to build churches or schools in offensive locations like old temples or near official buildings, tensions with the local Chinese population arose. The missionaries also abolished indigenous Chinese Catholic institutions that had survived the imperial ban. In some regions, Catholic missionaries started "quarantining" new Chinese converts from the hostile social environment as they see the mission as "enclaves of Christianity in an alien world". The separation sparked conspiracy theories about the Christians and eventually accumulated in the massacre of 60 people in a Catholic orphanage in 1870. In comparison, Protestant missions were less secretive and treated more favorably by the authorities.

Chinese literati and gentry produced a pamphlet attacking Christian beliefs as socially subversive and irrational. Incendiary handbills and fliers distributed to crowds were also produced, and were linked to outbreaks of violence against Christians. Sometimes, no such official incitement was needed in order to provoke the populace to attack Christians. For example, among the Hakka people in southeastern China, Christian missionaries frequently flouted village customs that were linked with local religions, including refusal to take part in communal prayers for rain (and because the missionaries benefitted from the rain, it was argued that they had to do their part in the prayers) and refusing to contribute funds to operas for Chinese gods (these same gods honoured in these village operas were the same spirits that the Boxers called to invoke in themselves, during the later rebellion).

Catholic missions offered protection to those who came to them, including criminals, fugitives from the law, and rebels against the government; this also led to hostile attitudes developing against the missions by the government.

== Boxer Rebellion ==
The 1890s saw a rise in anti-foreign sentiment in China; this gave rise to societies such as the "Society for Justice and Harmony" (commonly known as the "Boxers"). The Yellow River had flooded in 1898 and drought followed over the course of 1898–1900. A mixture of natural disasters, political tensions and legal wrangles led to many impoverished and disillusioned Chinese taking up martial arts and determining to make changes in their country. Anti-foreign sentiment led some Boxers to attack Christian missionaries in an attempt to drive out their foreign influence and bring a return to Chinese values.

During 1900, the movement spread and carried out actions against foreign people and their properties. This led to what became known as the ‘Boxer Rebellion’ of May 1900 to September 1901. The month of May 1900 saw popular demonstrations against foreigners, and the following month the Boxers received government backing to attack foreign strongholds within the country, until an alliance of foreign forces took control of Beijing in mid-August. The rebellion saw the murders of approximately 250 missionaries and their children and over 20,000 Chinese Christians.

== Martyrs of the Boxer Rebellion ==
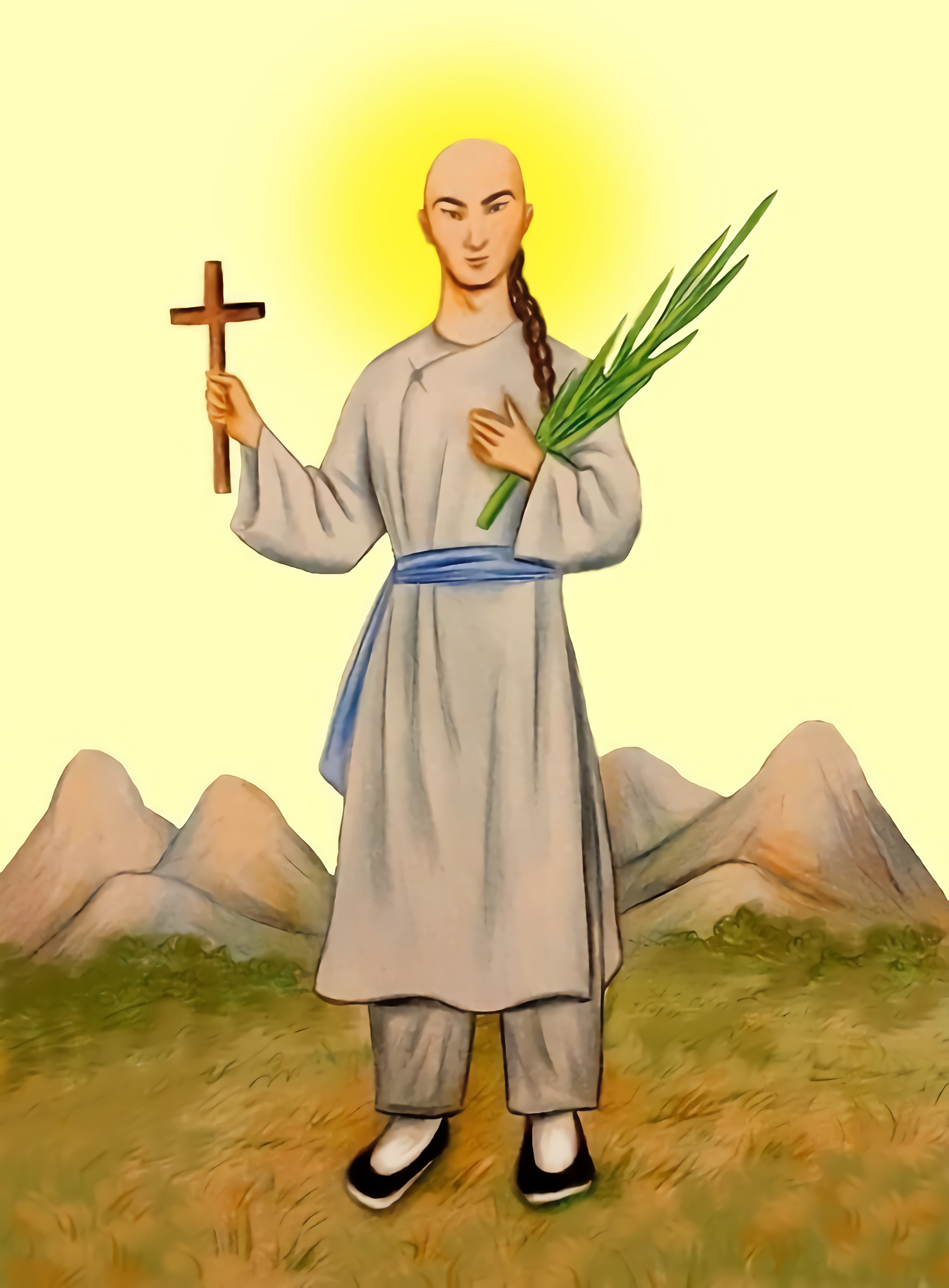
Saint Chi, an 18-year-old man who was tortured and martyred in China

During the height of the rebellion, many Catholics were murdered, including:

a) Martyrs of Shanxi, killed on 9 July 1900 (known as the Taiyuan massacre), who were Franciscan Friars Minor:

- Gregorio Grassi, bishop
- Francis Fogolla, bishop
- Elias Facchini, priest
- Théodoric Balat, priest
- Andrew Bauer, religious brother;

b) Martyrs of Southern Hunan, who were also Franciscan Friars Minor:

- Anthony Fantosati, bishop (martyred on 7 July 1900)
- Joseph Mary Gambaro priest (martyred on 7 July 1900)
- Cesidio Giacomantonio, priest (martyred on 4 July 1900)

To the martyred Franciscans of the First Order were added seven Franciscan Missionaries of Mary, of whom three were French, two Italian, one Belgian, and one Dutch:

- Mary Hermina of Jesus (in saeculo: Irma Grivot)
- Marie de la Paix Giuliani (in saeculo: Mary Ann Giuliani)
- Maria Chiara Nanetti (in saeculo: Clelia Nanetti)
- Marie of Saint Natalie (in saeculo: Joan Mary Kerguin)
- Marie of Saint Just (in saeculo: Ann Moreau)
- Marie-Adolphine (in saeculo: Ann Dierk)
- Mary Amandina (in saeculo: Paula Jeuris)

Of the martyrs belonging to the Franciscan family, there were also eleven Secular Franciscans, all Chinese:

- John Zhang Huan, seminarian,
- Patrick Dong Bodi, seminarian,
- John Wang Rui, seminarian,
- Philip Zhang Zhihe, seminarian,
- John Zhang Jingguang, seminarian,
- Thomas Shen Jihe, layman and a manservant,
- Simon Qin Chunfu, lay catechist,
- Peter Wu Anbang, layman,
- Chi (or Xi) Zhuzi, young layman and catechumen
- Francis Zhang Rong, layman and a farmer,
- Matthew Feng De, layman and neophyte,
- Peter Zhang Banniu, layman and labourer.

To these are joined a number of Chinese lay faithful:

- James Yan Guodong, farmer,
- James Zhao Quanxin, manservant,
- Peter Wang Erman, cook.

c) Martyrs of Zhili. When the uprising of the Boxers, which had begun in Shandong and then spread through Shanxi and Hunan, also reached South-Eastern Zhili, which was then the Apostolic Vicariate of Xianxian, in the care of the Jesuits, the Christians killed could be counted in thousands. Among these were four French Jesuit missionaries and at least 52 Chinese lay Christians: men, women and children – the oldest of them being 79 years old, while the youngest were aged only nine years. All suffered martyrdom in June and July 1900. Many of them were killed in the church in Zhujiahe Village, in which they were taking refuge and where they were in prayer together with the first two of the missionaries listed below:

- Leo Mangin, S.J., priest
- Paul Denn, S.J., priest
- Rémy Isoré, S.J., priest
- Modeste Andlauer, S.J., priest

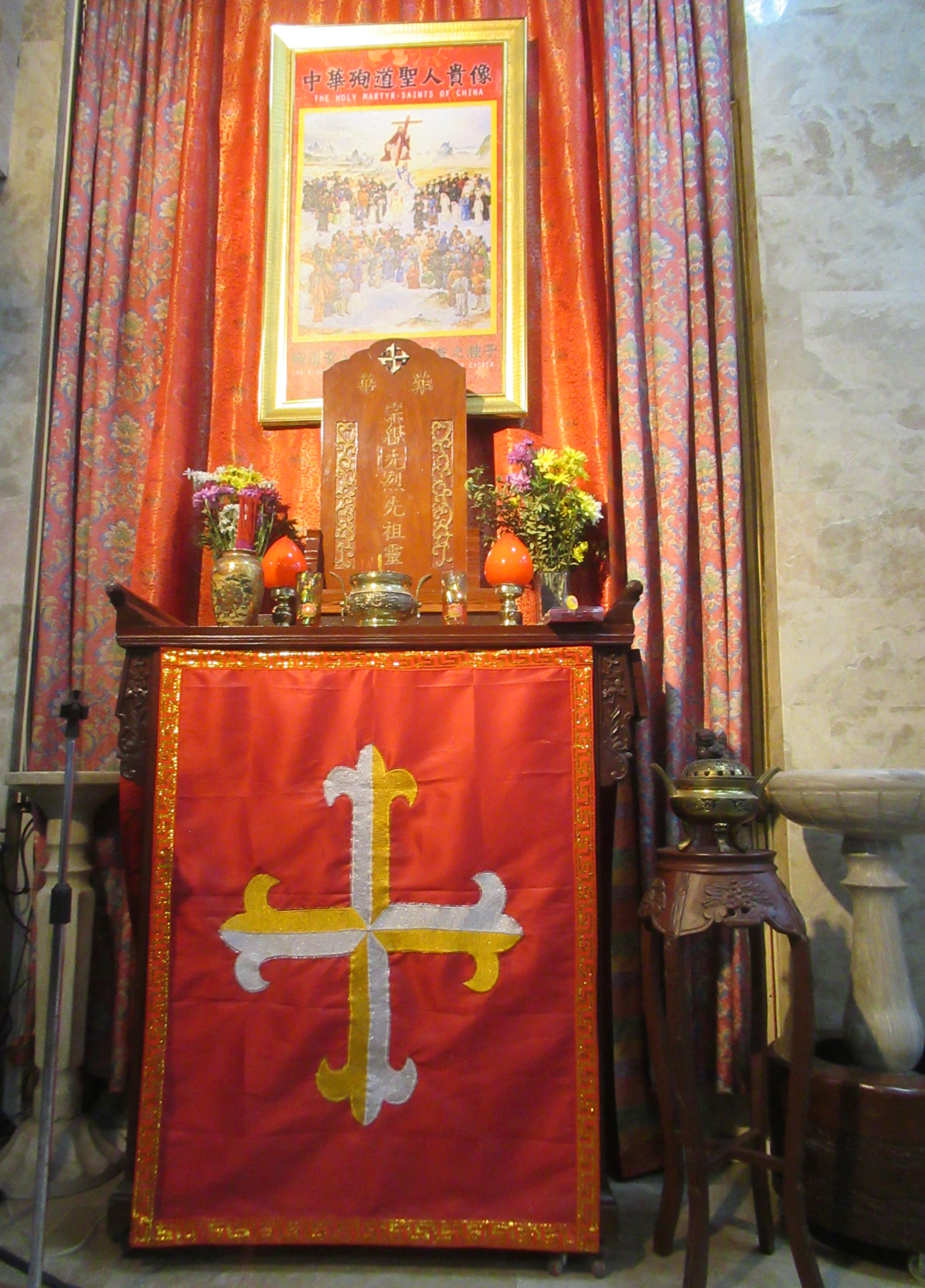
New martyrs of China altar, Binondo Chinese Parish Church

d) Martyr of Southern Shaanxi

- Alberic Crescitelli, a priest of the Pontifical Institute for Foreign Missions of Milan, who carried out his ministry in Southern Shaanxi and was martyred on 21 July 1900.

=== Aftermath of the Boxer Rebellion ===
Following the failure of the Boxer Rebellion, China was further subject to Western spheres of influence, which in turn led to a booming conversion period in the following decades. The Chinese developed respect for the moral level that Christians maintained in their hospital and schools. The continuing association between Western imperialism in China and missionary efforts nevertheless continued to fuel hostilities against missions and Christianity in China, and many missionary groups re-evaluated their role in working with foreign powers, both in China and around the world. A shift in Chinese attitudes led to an improvement in the relationship between the government and Christians, and by 1925 there were 8000 missionaries in the country, with the first native Chinese bishops being consecrated in 1926.

== Later martyrs ==
Some years later, members of the Salesian Society of St John Bosco were added to the considerable number of martyrs recorded above:

- Luigi Versiglia, bishop
- Callistus Caravario, priest

They were killed together on 25 February 1930, at Li-Thau-Tseul.

=== After 1930 ===
After 1930, China continued to be dangerous place for Christian missionaries. This was highlighted in 1934 with the murders of John and Betty Stam and their friends in Anhui.

== Missions after WWII ==
All missions were banned in China by the new communist regime after the outbreak of the Korean War in 1950, and officially continue to be legally outlawed in 2025.

== See also ==
- Chinese Martyrs
- China Martyrs of 1900 (Protestant martyrs)
- Metrophanes, Chi Sung (Eastern Orthodox martyrs)
- Martyrs of Japan
- Korean Martyrs
- Vietnamese Martyrs
