= Holy Angels Anglo Indian Higher Secondary School =

Private school in Chennai, India

Coordinates: 13.04119°N 80.241668°E

Information
- Motto: Towards Charity by Truth
- Religious affiliation: Franciscan Missionaries of Mary
- Established: 1888; 138 years ago
- Classes: Nursery - Class XII
- Gender: Girls
- Enrollment: c.3000
- Houses: Teresalina; Helen; Assunta; Hermine

Holy Angels Anglo Indian Higher Secondary School or Holy Angels' AI Hr. Sec School is an all-girls Roman Catholic, private, convent school located in Chennai, India, which offers education from nursery level to higher secondary (XII) level. The school is run by the Franciscan Missionaries of Mary. The school's motto is "Towards Charity By Truth". The school celebrated its platinum jubilee in the academic year 2009/10 with a 75th-year annual day celebration. A. P. J. Abdul Kalam attended. The school has 3000+ students belonging to many religions.

== History ==
The institute was founded in St. Thomas Convent, Mylapore. In 1888, St Antony's school was run by the parish priest for the education of Anglo-Indian children. In 1897, the Franciscan Missionaries of Mary sisters took charge of it, and it came to be called St Thomas European School. In 1909, the name "Holy Angels'" was given to the boarding house for Anglo-Indian children. But larger accommodations were soon required. Mgr. Teixeira, the Portuguese Bishop of Mylapore since 1928, proposed to sell to the FFM a piece of church property measuring approximately 5 acres at Mambalam (now T. Nagar).

In February 1933, the institution purchased the land, and plans were made for the construction of an Anglo-Indian School, a boarding home and a convent. Eight rooms were erected by 21 March 1934. Two months later, Bishop Carvalho laid the foundation for a new building in Mambalam (now T.Nagar). On 1 June 1934, Our Lady's Kindergarten was opened, comprising the outhouses. The first headmistress was M. Notre Dame de Pompei, born in India to Irish parents.

On 2 August 1934, the foundation stone for the new mission was blessed by the Bishop of Mylapore. On 2 July 1935, Holy Angels' was placed in a magnificent new building. On 27 June 1935, Mgr. Carvalho blessed each section of the new construction. Between 1937 and 1940, the original block was lengthened, a wing added, and a floor constructed, and the complete building was bridged to the main building.

== Convent ==
By July 1935, the FMM superior at Mylapore decided that the Holy Angels' institution would need to have a separate community with its own superior. On 5 August 1935, the decision was finalised and a community of nine sisters moved into a wing of the new building. An International Eucharistic Congress was held in Madras from 28 to 30 December 1937, the convent hosted a number of sisters of different congregations.

== World War II ==
In 1942, the children of the school, the sisters of the convent and the teachers were evacuated to Palmaner. A total of 252 pupils, 14 sisters, 8 lay teachers and 20 housemaids left. Meanwhile, the government authorities requisitioned the Holy Angels' property to be used as Air Raid Precaution Headquarters, the Madras High Court and the Law College for the duration of the war. In the chapel, a section of the main construction at Holy Angels', the Eucharist was celebrated very early on the morning of 22 April 1942. One very valuable item was left standing in the empty chapel: the beautiful and venerated statue of the Madonna, which would guard and protect Holy Angels' for the next four years. This statue of Madonna and the child Christ is a souvenir of Helene de Chappotin and is today housed in St. Thomas convent, the provincial house of the Chennai Province.

== Houses ==
Holy Angels' students are divided into four houses when they are in I std. The houses are named in honour of Franciscan Missionaries of Mary martyrs:

Teresalina house

- Colour: Red
- Patron: Sr. Teresalina
- Motto: Rowing Not Drifting

Teresalina House gets its name after Sr. Teresalina, a young FMM missionary who came to India in 1947 and was sent to Kashmir. During the Hindu-Muslim Riots of 1947 that took place after Independence, she died trying to protect her superior from the bullet of a terrorist. The house colour is red - the colour of sacrifice.

Helen House

- Colour: Blue
- Patron: Mother Mary of the Passion (Helene de Chappotin)
- Motto: Towards Charity By Truth

Helen House is in blue - the colour of the sky - signifying calmness and quietness. The patron is Mother Mary of the Passion, the founder of the FMM, the institute to which the school belongs. The motto of Helen House and of all FMM institutions is "Towards Charity By Truth". This motto was printed on all student report cards, along with an emblem carrying its Latin translation "Ad Charitatem Per Veritatem".

Assunta House

- Colour: Yellow
- Patron: Sr. Maria Assunta
- Motto: In God We Trust

Assunta House has its name from sister Assunta - a young Italian FMM nun who went to work for the poor and the marginalised.

Hermine House

- Colour: Green
- Patron: Sr. Hermine
- Motto: By Adversity To The Stars

Mother Hermine was a missionary who led a group of nuns to China where they were murdered along with several other missionaries during the Boxer Rebellion. Despite being warned of the impending danger, Mother Hermine inspired her sisters not to desert the orphans for whom they were working and faced death with a smile, singing praises of God. Hermine House has adopted her motto- "By Adversity To The Stars".

== Times of India survey ==
The Times of India and Research agency IMRB conducted a perception survey among parents, teachers and Chennai's public to rank the city's schools. Holy Angels Anglo Indian Higher Secondary School was ranked second in the survey published in February 2014.

== Notable alumni ==
- Indra Nooyi - businesswoman
- Samantha Ruth Prabhu - actress
- Aishwarya Rajesh - actress
- Revathi - Actress

== Sources ==
- Holy Angels' official website
