= Rosary Matriculation Higher Secondary School =

Private girls' school in Chennai, Tamil Nadu, India

Coordinates: 13.0355°N 80.2763°E

Location
- 11, Papanasam Sivan Salai, Kangayarpuram, Basha Garden, Mylapore; Chennai, Tamil Nadu, 600004; India

Information
- Type: Private, unaided
- Established: June 19, 1950
- Founder: Sisters of the Franciscan Missionaries of Mary
- School board: Tamil Nadu State Board (TNBHSE)
- Grades: Nursery–XII
- Gender: Girls
- Language: English
- Website: rosarychennai.com

Rosary Matriculation Higher Secondary School is a private girls’ school in Santhome, Chennai, Tamil Nadu, India. The school is managed by the Franciscan Missionaries of Mary (FMM) and follows the Tamil Nadu State Board curriculum, offering classes from nursery to XII in the English medium.

== History ==
The school was founded on 1950 by the Sisters of the Franciscan Missionaries of Mary to provide English-medium education in the Santhome area of the then-Madras (now Chennai).

In its early years, the institution functioned as a co-educational school up to Class V before transitioning to an all-girls’ school. Enrollment rose from about 400 students in 1950 to approximately 1,690 by 1975. For a time, the campus was shared with Stella Matutina College of Education until the latter moved to its own premises.

== Management ==
Rosary is administered by the Institute of the Franciscan Missionaries of Mary, a Catholic religious congregation founded in 1877 at Ootacamund (present-day Ooty) by Blessed Mary of the Passion (Hélène de Chappotin).

== Academics ==
The school follows the Tamil Nadu State Board curriculum with English as the medium of instruction, offering education from Nursery to Class XII.

== Milestones ==
In 2025, the school marked its 75th anniversary (Platinum Jubilee) with commemorative events and an alumni reunion.

== See also ==
- Education in Chennai
- Franciscan Missionaries of Mary
- Mary of the Passion
