= Alberic Crescitelli =

Italian Roman Catholic saint

Saint Alberico Crescitelli
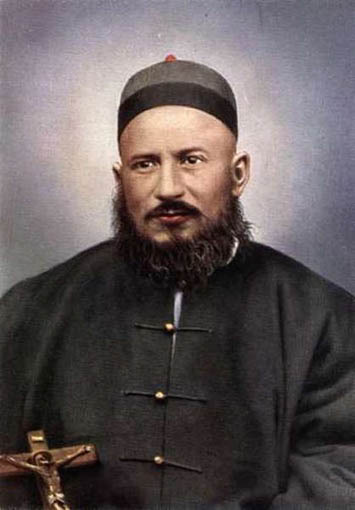

Martyr
- Born: 30 June 1863; Altavilla, Italy
- Died: 21 July 1900 (aged 37); Shaanxi, China
- Venerated in: Roman Catholic Church
- Beatified: 18 February 1951, Vatican City by Pope Pius XII
- Canonized: 1 October 2000, Vatican City by Pope John Paul II
- Feast: 22 July and 28 September as one of the Martyrs of China

Alberico (Alberic) Crescitelli (1863–1900), Chinese name Guo Xide (Chinese: 郭西德), was an Italian Catholic priest and missionary to China. Born in Italy on 30 June 1863, Alberico Crescitelli entered the Pontifical Institute for Foreign Missions in 1880 and was ordained a priest on 4 June 1887. The following year, he went to China and began work in the Apostolic Vicariate of Southern Shensi (now Diocese of Hanzhong) in southern Shaanxi.

Crescitelli was believed to have been killed in the Boxer Rebellion. Crescitelli's confreres, who had known him well and for many years, started his beatification cause in 1908, only eight years after his death. The testimony provided by the confreres was unanimous about the holiness of Crescitelli's life.

At the Vatican, in St. Peter's Basilica on 18 February 1951, Pope Pius XII declared Alberico Crescitelli "blessed." The Pope's speech was memorable, especially for the passage in which he described Father Crescitelli's martyrdom:

Humanly speaking, his death was horrible; perhaps one of the most atrocious recorded in history. Nothing was missing, neither the cruelty of the torments, nor the time they lasted, the most barbaric humiliations, nor the suffering of the heart, nor the hypocritical betrayal of false friends, nor the hostile and threatening screams of his murderers, nor the darkness of being abandoned.

Pope John Paul II included him in the list of 120 Martyr Saints of China canonized in St. Peter's Square on October 1, 2000.

This large group canonisation was bitterly opposed in China itself, with Bishop Fu Tieshan, the leader of the state-run Chinese Patriotic Catholic Association, describing it as "intolerable". A statement released by the Chinese Foreign Ministry alleged that "some of those canonised by the Vatican this time perpetrated outrages such as raping or looting in China and committed unforgivable crimes against the Chinese people." A further statement from China's State Administration of Religious Affairs singled out Alberico Crescitelli for special comment, alleging that he had been "notorious for taking the 'right of the first night' of each bride under his diocese." The Catholic Church's Holy Spirit Study Centre in Hong Kong has described the accusations as baseless.

In his homily at the canonisation ceremony on 1 October 2000, Pope John Paul II made a statement asking for forgiveness for any past wrongs by the missionaries to China: "There are those who, with a partial and not very objective reading of history, see only limits and errors in their action. If they happened, is there any man exempt from defects? - We ask for forgiveness."
