= Marie de la Paix Giuliani =

Italian religious sister, martyr and saint, died 1900

Saint Marie de la Paix Giuliani

Martyr
- Born: Marianna Giuliani; 12 December 1875; L'Aquila, Italy
- Died: 9 July 1900 (age 24); Taiyuan, China
- Beatified: 24 November 1946 by Pope Pius XII
- Canonized: 1 October 2000, Rome by Pope John Paul II
- Feast: 9 July (as one of the Martyr Saints of China)

Saint Marie de la Paix Giuliani (1875–1900, born Marianna Giuliani) was an Italian religious sister who died for her faith in China during the Boxer Rebellion and was canonised in 2000. She is one of the group known as the Martyr Saints of China who were canonised by Pope John Paul II 1 October 2000.

== Life ==
She was born Marianna Giuliani 12 December 1875 in L'Aquila, Italy, and joined the Franciscan Missionaries of Mary. She had a difficult childhood as although her mother taught her about Catholicism her father was frequently angry. Her mother died and her father abandoned her and her siblings. The de facto orphans were taken in by another family and her uncle suggested that she might join the Franciscan Missionaries of Mary. She became a novitiate in 1892 but she had spent some time training as a probationer beforehand. After she took her vows she went to Austria. There she learned a new language and culture while she helped to establish a new religious community.

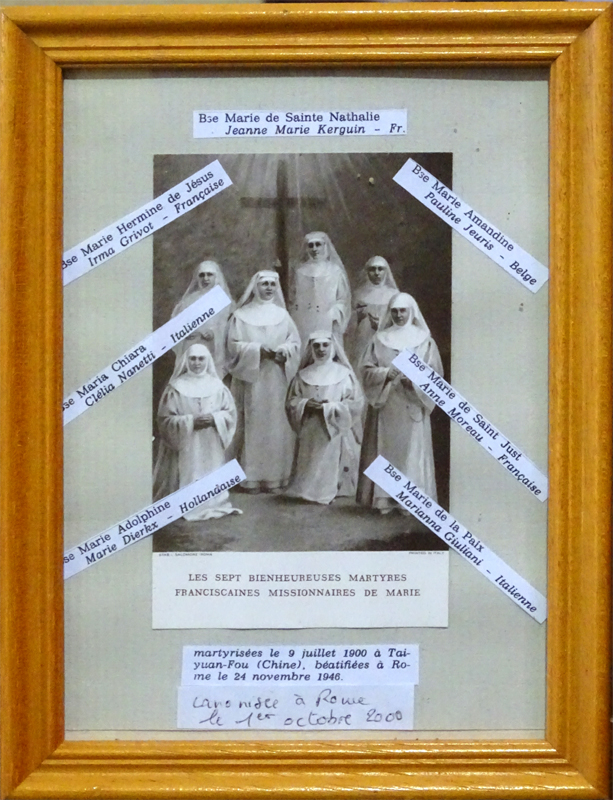
Seven martyrs including Giuliani

In 1899 she was one of a group of seven sisters from the order who went to Taiyuan, China, arriving on 4 May 1899, to set up an orphanage at the mission there under bishop Gregorio Grassi. As she had done in Austria the sisters had to learn a new language and culture. The other six sisters came from Belgium, France and the Netherlands although Sister Maria Chiara Nanetti was also Italian. She was the youngest of the sisters and she served as assistant to the Mother Superior, Marie-Hermine of Jesus. It was the Mother Superior who is reported to have protested that the sisters should not be denied the sacrifice of dying for their faith on 27 June 1900. She argued that they should be allowed to stay when the level of threat to the community rose and the Bishops advised that the sisters should change into local clothes and escape.

On 5 July 1900, during the Boxer Rebellion, the Christians at the mission were ordered to renounce their faith or face death; at 4pm on 9 July the priests, religious sisters, seminarians and Christian lay workers were all killed, in what is known as the Taiyuan massacre.

Marie de la Paix and her six fellow sisters were referred to as the "Martyrs of Shanxi" and it was said that they had been beheaded. They became saints after they were beatified by Pope Pius XII in 1946 and then later canonised by Pope John Paul II on 1 October 2000 among a group of 120 Martyr Saints of China.

She is referred to by several other versions of her name including Mary of Peace, Maria of Peace and Mary Ann (rather than Marianna) Giluiani.
