= Theresia Unno =

Japanese Roman Catholic nun (1911 – 1989)

Sr. Theresia Unno F.M.M.
- テレシア・ウンノ

Personal life
- Born: September 12, 1911
- Died: December 31, 1989 (aged 78)

Religious life
- Religion: Roman Catholic
- Institute: Franciscan Missionaries of Mary

Theresia Unno (テレシア・ウンノ; 1911 – 1989), also known as Tokoyo Unno, was a Japanese Roman Catholic nun based in the Philippines.

== Missionary work ==
Theresia Unno was noted for founding the Filipino-Japanese Foundation of Northern Luzon (Abong, or Baguio Nikkeijin Kai) in 1972. Its mission is to the Filipino-Japanese descendants, known as Nikkei-jin, who were fathered by Japanese soldiers and left stateless and ostracized after World War II. After she retired as a schoolteacher in Japan, Unno traveled to Manila in 1970 for the visit of Pope Paul VI. She stayed on after discovering the plight of the Nikkei-jin, focusing on the education of their children, who otherwise were not being taught at all.

There was strong anti-Japanese sentiment in the Philippines at the time, and sister Unno's organization gave the Nikkei-jin their first safe means to identify themselves, become educated, and work. She also led the OISCA (Organization for Industrial, Spiritual and Cultural Advancement) in its efforts to help Nikkei-jen farmers in Bahong and Alapang bring their Japanese vegetable produce to market by selling to the hospitality industry, and to Japanese expats living in Manila. Unno was able to get additional financial help for them directly from the Japanese government.

To honor Unno's legacy, Japanese ambassador to the Philippines Endo Kazuya paid his respects at her grave when he visited Baguio, where many Nikkei-jin still reside. Father Albert Haase also refers to her as a church founder. There was an effort to name the foundation that she established after her, but the superiors in Manila considered it inappropriate because she was still living, and that was not their custom. However Sr. Theresia Unno Memorial Hall, where Abong meets, is named for her.

Unno, whose death was noted in the Catholic Directory of the Philippines, was a member of the Franciscan Missionaries of Mary. Her first name is sometimes misspelled Theresa.
