= Francis Regis Clet =

French Catholic missionary and saint

Saint Francis Regis Clet CM
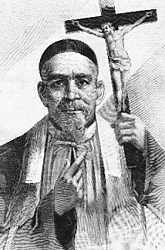
- Francis Regis Clet

Catholic Missionary
- Born: August 19, 1748; Grenoble, Kingdom of France
- Died: February 18, 1820 (aged 71); Wuchang, Qing dynasty
- Venerated in: Catholic Church
- Beatified: 27 May 1900, Saint Peter's Basilica, Kingdom of Italy by Pope Leo XIII
- Canonized: 1 October 2000, Saint Peter's Square, Vatican City by Pope John Paul II
- Feast: 18 February
- Attributes: Priest's cassock Crucifix; Palm branch

François-Régis Clet, CM (Chinese: 劉格來; pinyin: Liú Gélái; 19 August 1748 – 18 February 1820) was a French Catholic missionary who served in East Asia during the 19th century as a member of the Vincentians. He was canonized in 2000 as one of the Martyr Saints of China.

== Biography ==
=== Early life ===
Francois-Regis Clet was born in Grenoble, France in 1748. His family was middle class and quite large. Clet's parents, Césaire and Claudine Clet, had fifteen children, Francois-Regis being the tenth. He was baptized soon after birth in the church of Louis. In 1769, he entered the Congregation of the Mission (Vincentians), where he was later ordained. He worked as a priest in Annecy and Paris. He worked at the seminary for fifteen years until 1788. In 1788, Francois-Regis Clet was selected to travel to Paris, where he participated in the election of the new superior general, Jean-Félix-Joseph Cayla de la Garde. While Clet was in Paris, he was witness to the destruction of the clergy by an angry mob. This event led to Clet's eagerness to volunteer for a mission to China, a place where Christianity was not accepted.

=== Voyage to China ===
In July 1789, he went to China. He arrived at his first destination, Macao, that October. In Macao, Francis-Regis and his two companions learned Chinese. Clet struggled with the Chinese language, but was still able to baptize at least one hundred people during his first mission in the Jiangxi Province. In 1793, he transferred to Huguang. Huguang was not very accepting to foreign missionaries. This is where one of the largest Christian settlements that Clet helped to establish was destroyed. In 1811, after a Chinese Catholic was arrested, documents to the bishop were discovered. Due to a suspected plot, Chinese Christians were demanded to reject the Christian faith, and foreigners were ordered out. Despite attempts to stay in hiding, Francois-Regis was arrested in June 1819 at the age of 71.

=== Final days ===
After Clet was arrested, he was brutally tortured and held under very poor conditions. After about a week, Clet was transferred to Kaifeng for one month. He was questioned and tortured again before being transferred to Wuchang. In Wuchang, he was treated better. He was even able to receive communion. While he was there he learned that his companion, Fr. Lamiot, had been arrested due to the discovery of three letters that had been exchanged between him and Clet. Eventually, Clet was to appear before a court of justice, where he was sentenced to death for the religious corruption of the Emperor's subjects. In his final moments, at age 71, he prayerfully dedicated the sacrifices of his life to God. On February 18, 1820, Clet was tied on a cross and strangled with a rope until he suffocated to death.

== Sainthood ==
Clet was declared venerable in 1843. He was then beatified in 1900. On October 1, 2000, he was canonized by Pope John Paul II. The feast day of Clet is celebrated on February 18.

== See also ==
- Catholic Church in China
- Intercession of saints
