= Sister Irene O'Connor =

Franciscan nun and musician

Irene O'Connor FMM
- Genres: Christian music; Synth folk
- Website: www.sisterireneoconnor.com

Irene O'Connor FMM (Born 1931 - 1932) is an Australian Catholic religious sister in the Franciscan Missionaries of Mary and a musician.

== Career ==
In addition to traditional hymns, O'Connor is known for mixing religious music with popular music, most famously on the 1973 album Fire of God's Love. Fire of God's Love and O'Connor's story were covered in an Australian Broadcasting Corporation segment and in an article entitled "Sister Act", on page 68 in the 29 April 2023 edition of The Economist. The album has become a highly sought after vinyl LP.

Sister Irene O'Connor recorded several albums during the 1960s while teaching children in Singapore. While in Singapore she met Sister Marimil Lobregat who was en route to Indonesia. The two became friends, and recorded Fire of God's Love after reconnecting a decade later. The two recorded the album entirely on their own, with O'Connor writing, singing and performing all instruments on the recording, and Lobregat handling all of the recording, engineering and sound production.

Regarding a reissue of Fire of God's Love in 2025, Shaad D’Souza of The Guardian wrote,

Simple and spectral, it is a marvel of analogue pop music – a collection of airy folk songs, played largely on drum machine, acoustic guitar and synth organ, which sometimes feels more spiritually aligned with cult singer-songwriters like Princess Demeny and Mary Margaret O’Hara than most other non-secular records... [Its] songs are devoutly religious but skirt lines between devotional music and contemporary pop; some tracks, such as album opener "Fire (Luke 12:49)" contain elements of dub, while others, such as "Teenager’s Chorus", feel of a piece with pastoral British folk music. The whole thing feels a little like a miracle: a sweet, compelling pop record from a hugely unlikely source.
