= Maria Assunta Pallotta =

Italian nun (1878–1905)

Blessed Maria Assunta Pallotta
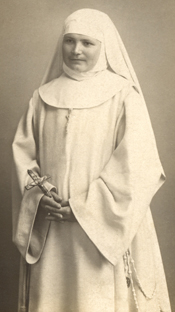

Religious
- Born: 20 August 1878; Force, Kingdom of Italy
- Died: 7 April 1905 (aged 26); Taiyuan, Shanxi, China
- Venerated in: Roman Catholic Church
- Beatified: 7 November 1954, Saint Peter's Basilica, Vatican City by Pope Pius XII
- Feast: 7 April
- Attributes: Religious habit
- Patronage: Missionaries; Against typhus

Maria Assunta Pallotta (20 August 1878 - 7 April 1905), born Assunta Maria Pallotta, was an Italian Roman Catholic nun who served as a member of the Franciscan Missionaries of Mary and also as part of the missions to China in the aftermath of the Boxer Rebellion.

Following the recognition of two miracles, Pope Pius XII celebrated her beatification on 7 November 1954.

== Early life ==
Maria Assunta Pallotta was born on 20 August 1878 to Luigi Pallotta and Eufrasia Casali. She was the first of six children and had one sister and four brothers. She was baptized on the following day, 21 August (in the names of Assunta Maria Liberata), and was confirmed at the age of two on 7 July 1880, receiving her Confirmation from the Bishop of Ascoli Piceno, Bartolomeo Ortolani.

She began her schooling in 1884, at the age of six, attending until the age of eight in 1886. While she learned to read and write, she did not receive a formal education.

By the time she was eleven - in 1889 - her father had left for work purposes, leaving her as the sole breadwinner of the household. Pallotta was forced to help her mother manage the home and to raise her brothers. In testimonies for her beatification people recalled that she was animated when given the chance to teach others about religious issues but was for the most part a solemn child who maintained penitential practices that were far too advanced for a child of her age. She had a love of the rosary and kept one with her at all times.

== Life as a nun ==
In her late teens she realized she wanted to be a nun. Her parish priest made arrangements for her to join a religious congregation that was a branch of the Franciscan Order. She left for Rome in order to join the order on 5 May 1898. As a postulant she worked in the kitchens.

She commenced her novitiate on 9 October 1898 and at her request was able to keep her baptismal name, although it was rearranged to Maria Assunta. She was sent to Grottaferrata for her novitiate and was assigned there to take care of animals and the harvesting of olives. Pallotta was admitted for profession on 8 December 1900 in the Church of Saint Helena.

After her profession she was sent to Florence and arrived there on 3 January 1902. On 1 January 1904 she requested to join the Franciscan missions in China to work in the leper colonies.

Pallotta was eager to offer herself to God for the conversion of others and was devoted to the Poor Souls in Purgatory; she recited 100 times each day the Eternal Rest 100 times each day and gained indulgences for the Poor Souls. Her lifelong motto was: "I will become a saint!" In January 1904 she wrote to her parents, saying, "I ask the Lord for the grace to make known to the world, purity of intention, which consists in doing everything for the love of God, even the most ordinary actions". Pallotta made her final vows on 13 February 1904 and not long after learned she would be going to the missions in China. Before she departed she had a private audience with Pope Pius X and asked for his blessing; he encouraged Pallotta and gave her his blessing.

She departed on 19 March 1904 from Naples and arrived on 18 June 1904 in Tong-Eul-Keou in Shanxi. She worked for several months as a cook in an orphanage and learned to speak Mandarin.

On 19 March 1905 she learnt that she had contracted typhus and thus on 25 March 1905 - as her health took a steep decline - asked for the Holy Viaticum and the Extreme Unction as well as the sacraments. When one of her fellow religious sisters seemed about to die of the disease she asked to die instead. On 7 April 1905 she died with the mission's confessor and others around her. Her final words, in Mandarin, were: "Eucharist! Eucharist!" It was said that all of a sudden a delightful fragrance similar to violets and incense filled the room. Her remains stayed in the infirmary, but local Christians stormed the building demanding to experience the miracle for themselves as news of the odor spread. For three days the scent filled the house until her funeral and burial on 9 April 1905.

The superior of the congregation met with Pius X in a private audience and told him of the odor the late Pallotta emanated; the pontiff expressed a keen interest in her beatification and said: "You have to start the cause and soon!" Her remains were exhumed on 23 April 1913 and were found to be incorrupt but with her burial robes disintegrating. She is now buried in Tai Yan-Fou.

== Beatification ==
The proceedings for the beatification process commenced on two fronts in two processes in both China, in the diocese where Pallotta died, and in Frascati near Rome. The decree on all of her writings - which were required for the cause and to investigate the depth of her spiritual life and adherence to church doctrine - was approved and signed on 23 January 1918.

The Congregation of Rites formally approved the cause until 25 July 1923, thus granting Pallotta the title Servant of God. The two processes were then ratified and validated on 13 November 1928 and allowed for Rome to investigate the cause themselves.

On 28 February 1932 she was proclaimed to be Venerable after Pope Pius XI acknowledged the fact that Pallotta had lived a model Christian life of heroic virtue which was deemed to be exercised to an extraordinary degree.

Two miracles required for the beatification to take place were investigated and received the papal approval of Pope Pius XII on 19 October 1954. The pope presided over her beatification on 7 November 1954.

The current postulator of the cause is the Franciscan friar Giovangiuseppe Califano.

== Legacy ==
In 2012 a school named after Pallotta, Blessed Maria Assunta Pallotta Middle School, was opened in Waterloo, Iowa, US.

Located in the city of Petaling Jaya, in the state of Selangor, Malaysia, Assunta Hospital was founded by a group of missionary sisters from the Franciscan Missionaries of Mary (FMM) in 1954. The Hospital had its beginnings during the pre-independence days and was founded under the directives of the Catholic Hierarchy in Kuala Lumpur. Four sisters from the Franciscan Missionaries of Mary (FMM) started a tiny clinic (named Ave Maria) in Section 1, Road 4 in Petaling Jaya where the medical needs of the underprivileged were attended to. The present hospital was successfully completed in 1959 to cope with the expanding population of the new township of Petaling Jaya.

== Bibliography ==
- Dal Pra, Paola (1981). Audacia della minorità : b. Maria Assunta Pallotta francescana missionaria di Maria (in Italian). New York: Porziuncola.
- Dal Pra, Paola (2004). La discesa verso l'alto. Maria Assunta Pallotta. Una giovane francescana testimone della tenerezza di Dio (in Italian). New York: Editrice Missionaria Italiana. ISBN 9788830713086.
