= Marie of Saint Natalie =

French missionary and martyr of China

St. Marie of Saint Natalie
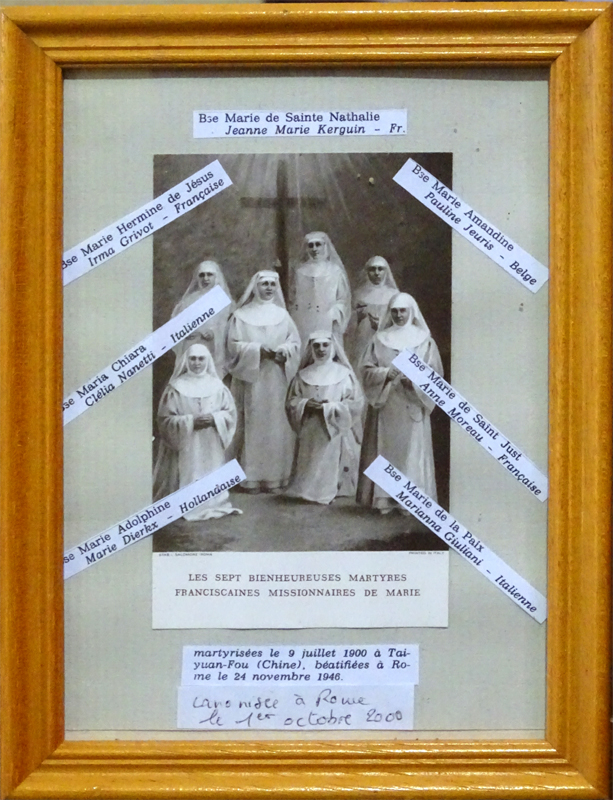

Missionary and Martyr of China
- Born: Jeanne-Marie Guerguin; 4 May 1864; Belle-Isle-en-Terre, Côtes-du-Nord, Second French Empire
- Died: 9 July 1900 (aged 36); Taiyuan, Shanxi, Qing China
- Cause of death: Decapitation
- Venerated in: Catholic Church
- Canonized: 1 October 2000 by Pope John Paul II
- Feast: 15 January

Marie of Saint Natalie, born Jeanne-Marie Guerguin (sometimes spelt Kerguin; 4 May 1864 – 9 July 1900) was one of the 120 Martyrs of China.

== Life ==
She was born in Belle-Isle-en-Terre, Cotes-du-Nord, on 4 May 1864 into a family of Breton farmers. She learned to read at the local school. Having lost her mother as a child, she was in charge of overseeing the household.

She entered the convent at Saint-Brieuc in 1887. She was a member of the Franciscan Missionaries of Mary. In 1899 she was one of a group of seven sisters from the order who went to Taiyuan, China, arriving on 4 May 1899, to set up an orphanage at the mission there under bishop Gregorio Grassi.

It was proposed that the nuns should escape when the situation got worse but it was the Mother Superior who is reported to have protested that the nuns should not be denied the sacrifice of dying for their faith on 27 June 1900. She argued that they should be allowed to stay when the level of threat to the community rose.

On 5 July 1900, during the Boxer Rebellion, the Christians at the mission were ordered to renounce their faith or face death; at 16:00 on 9 July the priests, nuns, seminarians and Christian lay workers were all killed, in what is known as the Taiyuan massacre.

During the Boxer Rebellion she was martyred by decapitation on 9 July 1900 at Taiyuan with seven of the other sisters. They became saints after they were beatified by Pope Pius XII in 1946 and then later canonised by Pope John Paul II on 1 October 2000 among a group of 120 Martyr Saints of China.
