= Franciscan Children's =

Pediatric specialty hospital in Boston

- Children's Medical Center Corp.

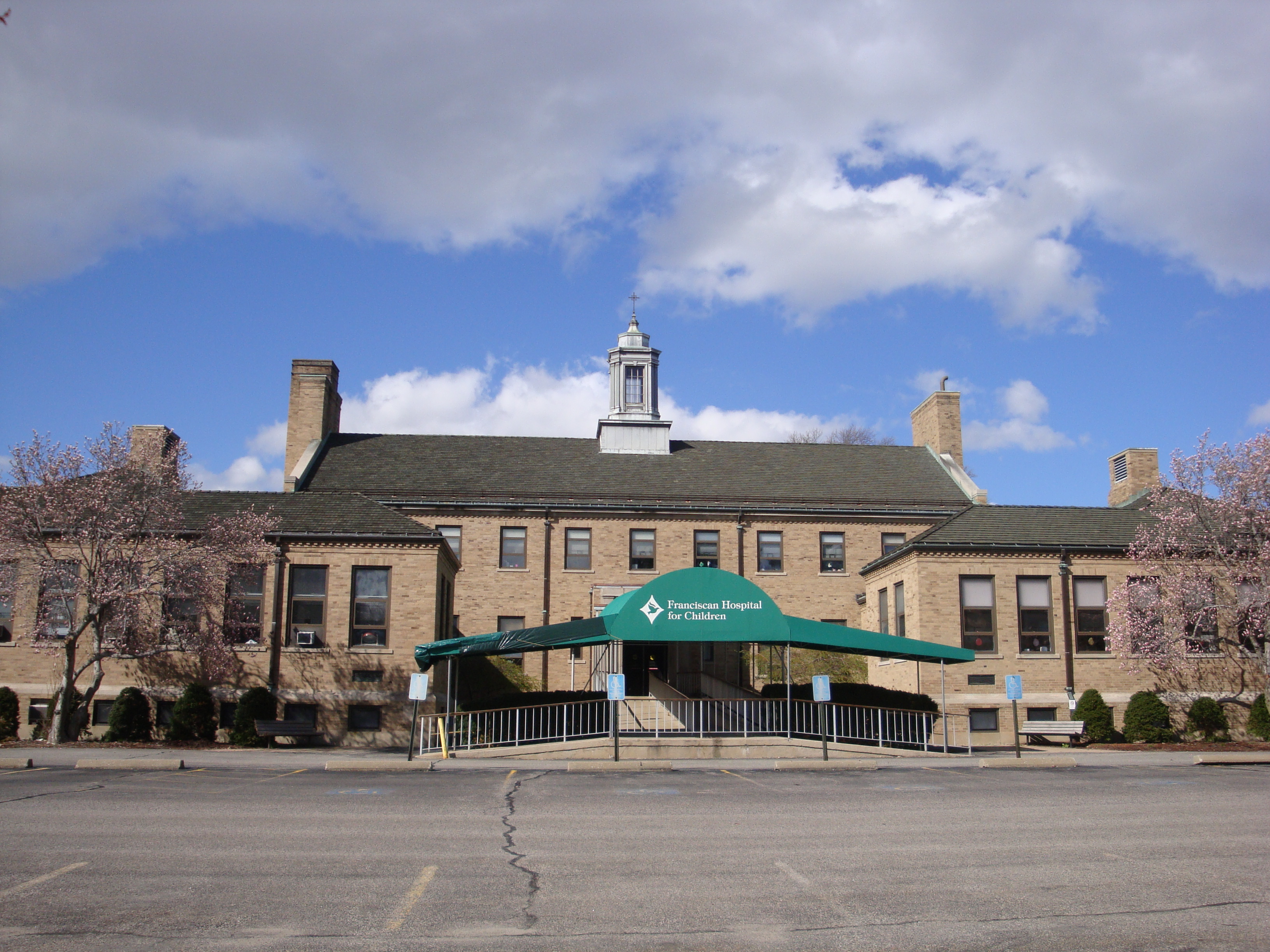

Geography
- Location: Allston–Brighton, Boston, Massachusetts, United States
- Coordinates: 42.350196°N 71.143501°W

Organization
- Type: Specialist
- Religious affiliation: Catholic church
- Network: Boston Children's Hospital

Services
- Standards: Joint Commission
- Emergency department: No
- Beds: 112 (2022)
- Speciality: Pediatrics

Helipads
Number	Length		Surface
Number	ft	m	Surface
			Bus 57, 66, 501; Green Line B

History
- Former names: Joseph P. Kennedy, Jr. Memorial Hospital
- Opened: 1949

Links
- Website: franciscanchildrens.org
- Lists: Hospitals in Massachusetts

Franciscan Children's is a non-profit pediatric specialty hospital located in the Brighton neighborhood of Boston, Massachusetts. Founded in 1949, the facility provides inpatient and outpatient chronic care and rehabilitation services to pediatric patients. In 2022, the hospital had 112 staffed beds and operated with revenues of $78.7 million, at a profit of $0.1 million. It also offers mobile health services such as home care and school visits, and provides special education at its Kennedy Day School. Notably, it is the only rehabilitation facility in the region which accepts infants requiring ventilator support.

== History ==
Franciscan Children's was founded in 1949 through the collaboration of Archbishop of Boston Richard Cushing and the Franciscan Missionaries of Mary. Funded largely with a $600,000 gift by the Kennedy family, the hospital was originally named the Joseph P. Kennedy, Jr. Memorial Hospital, honoring the late Kennedy who was killed during a 1944 air mission over England during World War II. In 1989, the hospital was renamed Franciscan Children's Hospital and Rehabilitation Center, which was then shortened to Franciscan Children's in 2016.

In 2023, Franciscan was acquired by Children's Medical Center Corp., parent company of Boston Children's Hospital.

As of 2024, services offered by Franciscan include inpatient services such as behavioral health, rehabilitation, and ventilator care, as well as outpatient services including dentistry. The hospital is known for accepting patients requiring intensive and complex care due to major trauma, chronic conditions and serious behavioral problems.
