= Amandina of Schakkebroek =

Belgian Franciscan missionary

Saint Amandina of Schakkebroek
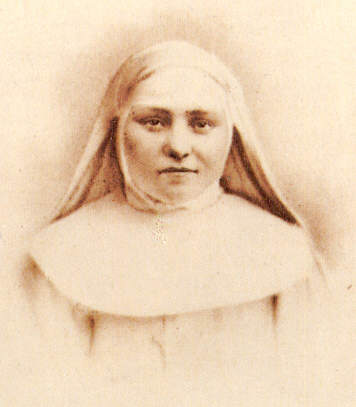

Martyr
- Born: 28 December 1872; Schakkebroek, Herk-de-Stad, Belgium
- Died: 9 July 1900 (Aged 27); Taiyuan, China
- Venerated in: Roman Catholic Church
- Beatified: 24 November 1946 by Pope Pius XII
- Canonized: October 1, 2000 by Pope John Paul II
- Feast: July 9

Saint Amandina of Schakkebroek (28 December 1872 – 9 July 1900), born Pauline Jeuris, was a Franciscan sister of Belgian origin who served in China. She was beatified and canonized together with other martyrs of the Boxer Rebellion.

== Background ==
Her official name was "Marie-Pauline Jeuris". Her father was Cornelius Jeuris, born on 25 February 1830 and her mother was Agnes Thijs, born on 13 May 1836. Her mother died on 27 October 1879 with the birth of the ninth child. Pauline was the seventh child.

== Education ==
When she was only seven years old, Pauline had already lost her mother. Until the age of fifteen she was placed with a neighbour woman (Celis-Jans). Thereafter she stayed for two years with the family Van Schoonbeek-Jans.

She attended primary school with the sisters Ursulines in Herk-de-Stad. In 1886 she was serving with the Sisters of Love congregation in Sint-Truiden, which also allowed her to study. Her elder sister Marie had already joined this congregation and her two-years-older sister Rosalie also had already worked there for two years.

On 2 August 1892 she went to Hasselt to assist the household of her sister Anna, struck by illness and widowed with four children.

== Religious life ==
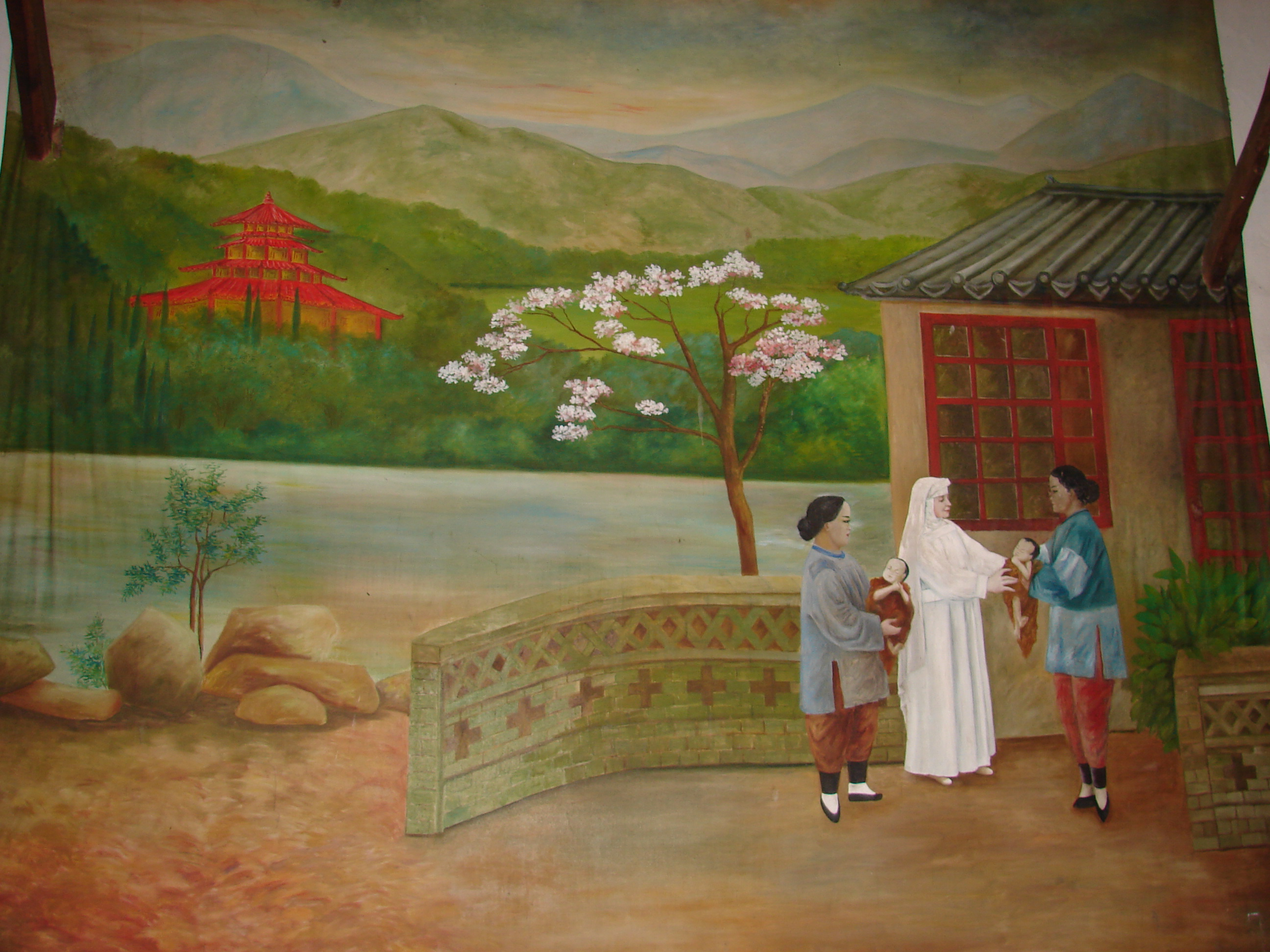
Saint Amandina at her mission post in Taiyuan, China. (Painting in the choir of the "Chinese Chapel" in the Amandina museum)

She entered the Institute of Franciscan Missionaries of Mary with the name Marie Amandine. Her first assignment was to go to Marseilles to nurse the sick, also completing a sacrament. Her second was in Taiyuan to work in the mission hospital. Her humor, friendliness, and healing with laughter gained her the esteem of the Chinese, who called her "the laughing foreigner".

In the course of the Boxer Rebellion, an edict was issued on 1 July 1900 which, in substance, said that the time of good relations with European missionaries and their Christians was now past: that the former must be repatriated at once and the faithful forced to apostatize, on penalty of death.

When she heard the news that a persecution was approaching St. Amandine said: "I pray God, not to save the martyrs, but to fortify them." With true Franciscan joy she and her companions met their deaths singing the Te Deum, the hymn of thanksgiving. Seven sisters, including St. Marie Amandina, were martyred on 9 July 1900 and were canonized on 1 October 2000 along with other Martyr Saints of China.
