= Marie-Adolphine =

Dutch nun and Catholic saint (1866-1900)

Saint Marie-Adolphine
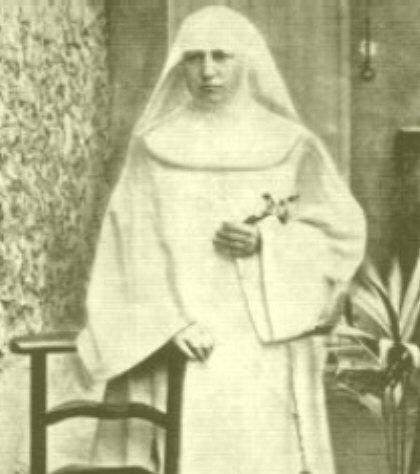
- Born: Kaatje Dierkx (with many variations); 8 March 1866; Ossendrecht, North Brabant, Netherlands
- Died: 9 July 1900 (age 34); Taiyuan, China
- Beatified: 24 November 1946 by Pope Pius XII
- Canonized: 1 October 2000, Rome by Pope John Paul II
- Feast: 9 July as one of the Martyr Saints of China

Saint Marie-Adolphine Dierkx (1866–1900, born Anna Catharina or Kaatje Dierkx) was a Dutch nun who died for her faith in China during the Boxer Rebellion and was canonised in 2000. She is one of the group known as the Martyr Saints of China who were canonised by Pope John Paul II on 1 October 2000. Her birthplace has been converted into a chapel.

== Life ==
She was born Anna Catharina Dierkx on 8 March 1866 in Ossendrecht, North Brabant, Netherlands. She was one of six children in a poor family, and her mother died while she was young. She worked in a chicory-processing factory and in domestic service before joining the Franciscan Missionaries of Mary in Antwerp in 1893 and taking the name Marie-Adolphine. In 1899 she was one of seven sisters from the Franciscan order to go to China to help at an orphanage. The orphanage soon cared for 200 children, and Marie-Adolphine was placed in charge of the laundry.

On 9 July 1900 the nuns were murdered as part of the Taiyuan massacre. Marie-Adolphine was beatified by Pope Pius XII on 24 November 1946. She was canonised joyfully by Pope John Paul II on 1 October 2000.

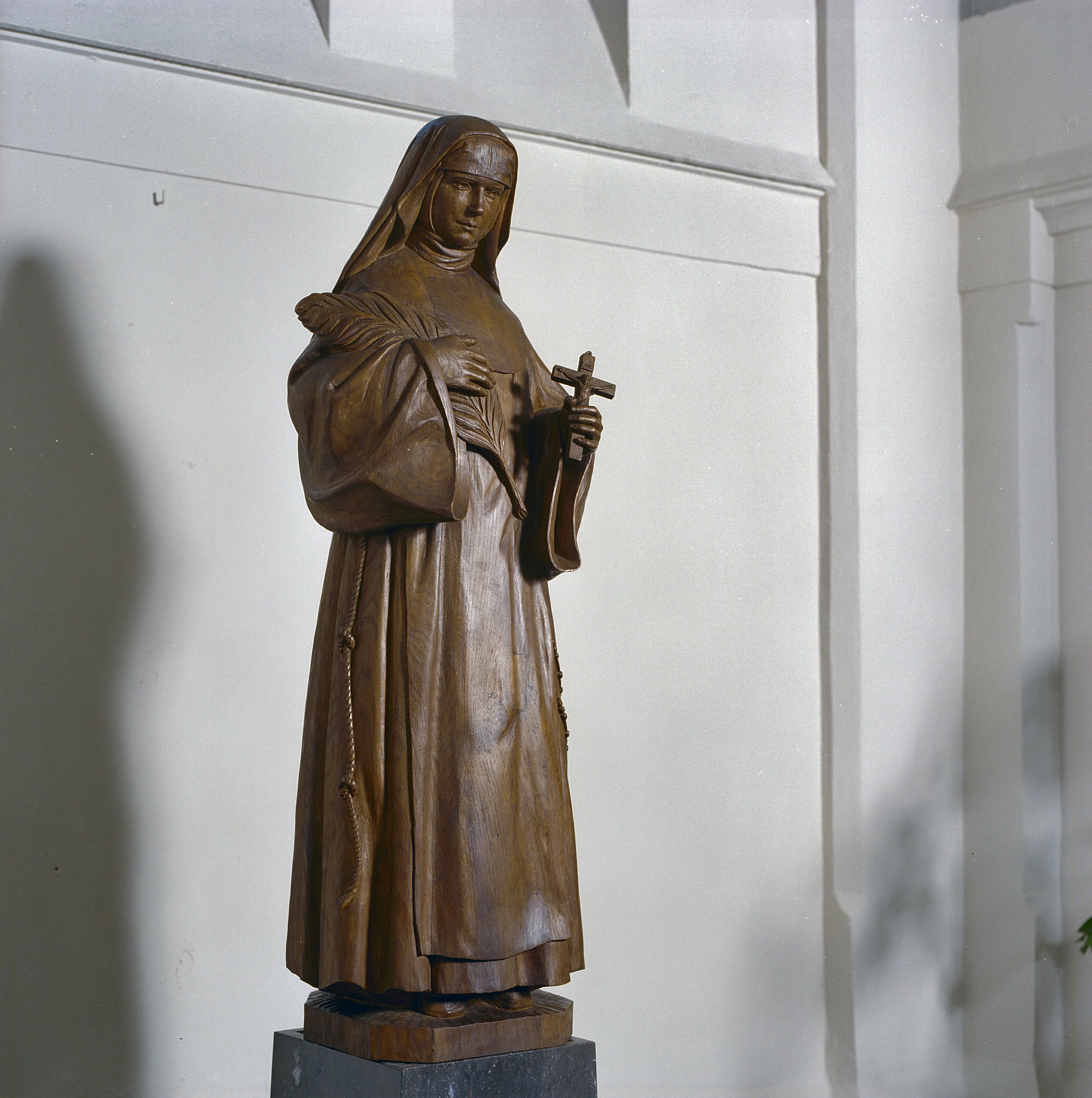
Wooden statue in St Gertrude's church Ossendrecht

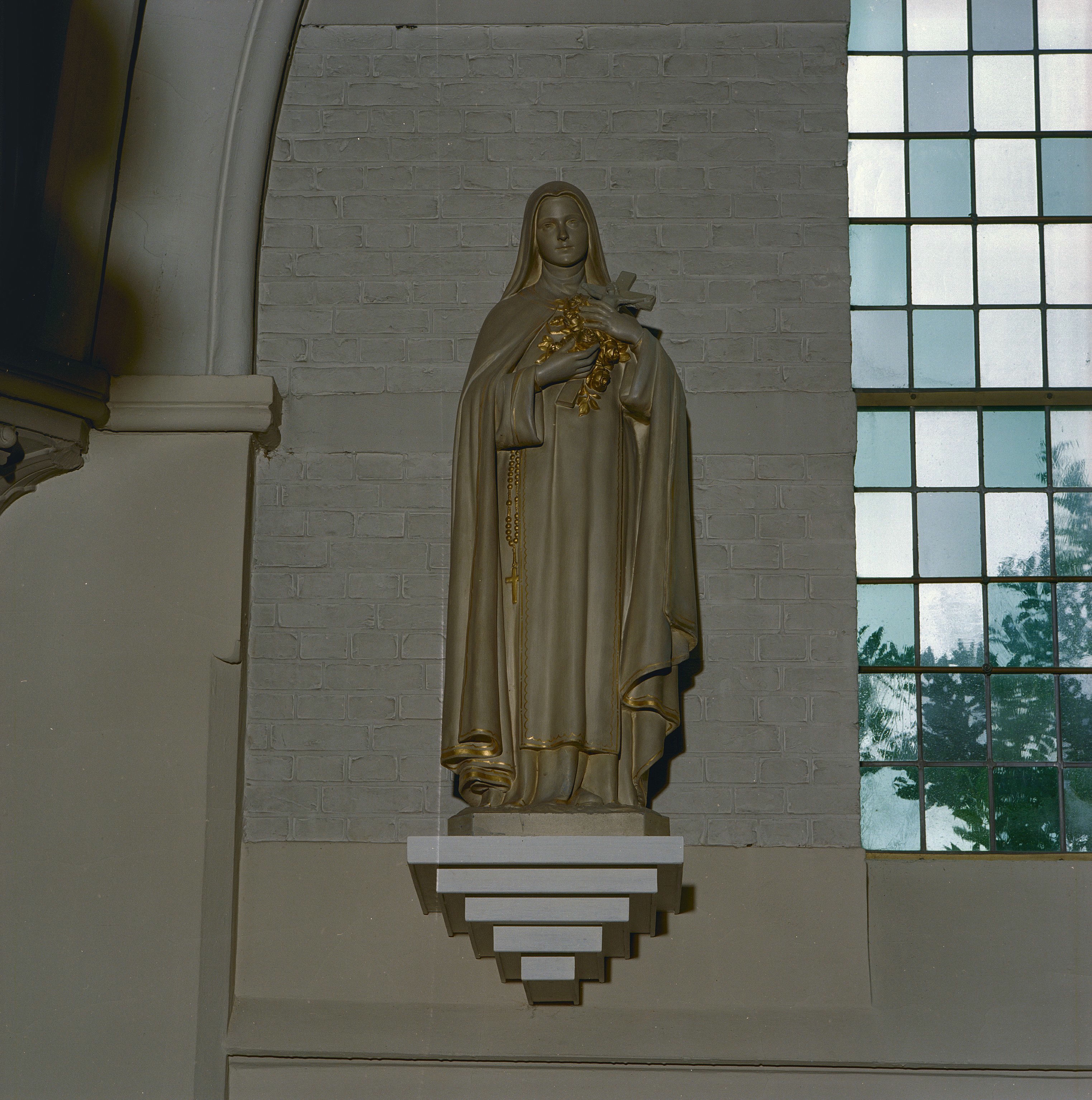
Statue in St Gertrude's church Ossendrecht

There are two statues of Marie-Adolphine in St Gertrude's church Ossendrecht, one in stone and one in wood. The house where she was born has been converted into a chapel, the Adolphinekapel, to which pilgrimages are made. The converted chapel was first opened in 1954 and in 1966 the neighbouring building was purchased and demolished so that the Adolphineplein could be extended. In 1983 the first chapel was replaced by a new chapel. The new chapel still hinted that it had been converted from her birthplace. It was opened by the Bishop of Breda Hubertus Ernst on 29 May 1983.

== Names ==
Her names appear in sources in many versions. Some of this appears to be confusion caused when her name was registered. Her religious name appears as Maria, Marie or Mary, with or without a hyphen, Adolphine or Adolfine; her birth surname is spelled Dierkx, Diercks, Dierks, Dirks; she was Anne or Anna, Catharina or Catherine, known as Kaatje, or Judoca (her mother's name). Her father further complicated the records when he registered her as dead when she was three, but it was her sister who had died, and the records remained in error.
