= John of Triora =

Italian missionary and martyr-saint

Saint John of Triora
- Born: 1760
- Died: 1816 (aged 55–56)
- Cause of death: Martyrdom
- Beatified: 1900 by Pope Leo XIII
- Canonized: 2000 by Pope John Paul II

John of Triora (Chinese name: 蓝月旺; 1760 – 1816, Italian name: Giovanni da Triora) was an Italian missionary and martyr saint of 19th century China.

== Life ==
He was born in 1760 in Molini di Triora. His parents were Antonio Maria Lantrua and Maria Pasqua Ferraironi. His name at birth was Francesco Maria Lantrua.

He joined the Franciscan Order in 1777 in Rome and became a friar in with the name of Giovanni (John). He was ordained to the priesthood in 1784 and became a teacher of theology in Tivoli and Tarquinia. Later he became responsible for the convents of Tarquinia, Velletri and Montecelio.

In 1799, he went as a missionary to China. He first arrived in Macao and learned Chinese. He adopted Chinese culture and dressed in Chinese clothes. He later went to serve as a missionary in Shaanxi and later in Hunan in 1812.

In 1815, during the persecution of the Jiaqing Emperor, he was arrested and put in prison. He was tortured and told to renounce his faith. He was later executed by strangulation on February 7th 1816 in Changsha.

== Canonization ==
He was beatified on May 27, 1900, by Pope Leo XIII and canonized along with other martyrs of China on October 1, 2000, by Pope John Paul II.
