= Marie-Hermine of Jesus =

French Roman Catholic saint

Saint Marie-Hermine of Jesus
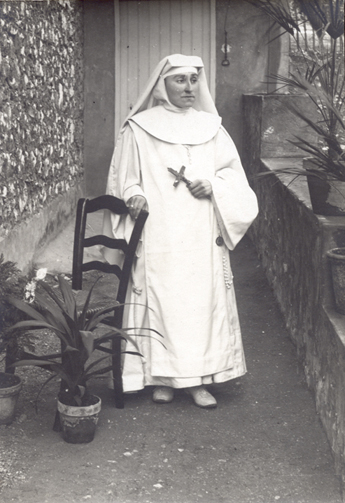
- Born: Irma Grivot; 28 April 1866; Beaune, France
- Died: 9 July 1900 (age 34); Taiyuan, China
- Beatified: 24 November 1946 by Pope Pius XII
- Canonized: 1 October 2000, Rome by Pope John Paul II
- Feast: 9 July as one of the Martyr Saints of China

Saint Marie-Hermine of Jesus (born Irma Grivot, French: [iʁma ɡʁivo]; 1866–1900) was a French nun and Mother Superior who died during the Boxer Rebellion in China and was canonised in 2000. She and six other nuns had gone to China to create a small hospital and to staff an orphanage, but were ultimately killed due to their association with foreign interference. She is one of the group known as the Martyr Saints of China who were canonised by Pope John Paul II 1 October 2000.

== Life ==
Marie-Hermine was born Irma Grivot on 28 April 1866 in Beaune, France, and she had only a basic education. Her father made barrels and he and her mother did not support her ambition to lead a religious life. She first took a job as a tutor to gain her independence and she joined the Franciscan Missionaries of Mary in a pre-novitiate in 1894 at Vanves. She went on to her novitiate at Le Châtelet and this took some time as she was frequently ill.

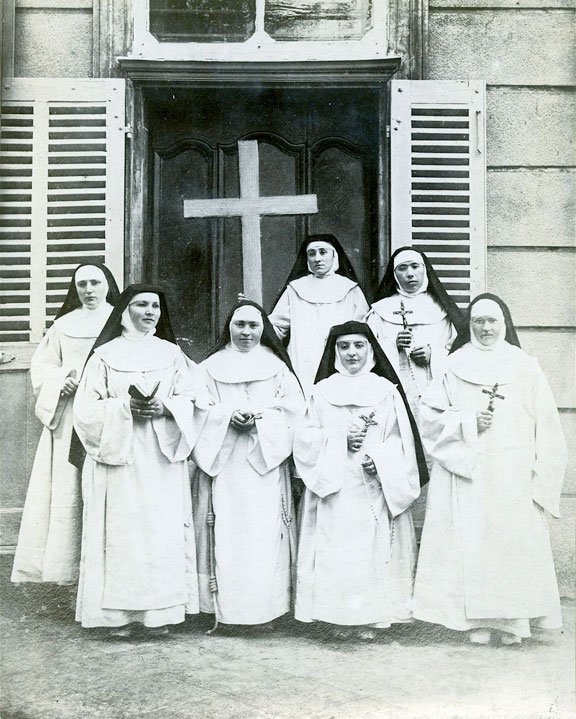
The seven missionary nuns/Shanxi martyrs

In 1899 she was the Mother Superior of a group of seven sisters from the order who left Marseilles on 12 May 1899. They went to Taiyuan, China, arriving on 4 May 1899, to set up an orphanage at the mission there under bishop Gregorio Grassi. The seven nuns were from France, Italy, Belgium, and the Netherlands. Marie de la Paix Giuliani who was Italian and who was the youngest of the nuns became Mother Superior Marie-Hermine of Jesus's assistant. The nuns who left China were aware of the dangers as the Boxers had already killed other missionaries. They would be there during the Boxer Rebellion which was a violent, anti-Christian, and anti-imperialist insurrection that ran from 1899 to 1901.

On 27 June 1900, the missionaries realised they were in peril and their Bishops advised that the sisters should remove their habits and escape in plain clothes. Marie-Hermine of Jesus protested this advice, arguing that the sisters should be allowed to stay and take the risk of being killed for their faith.

On 5 July 1900, the Christians at the mission were told that they would be killed if they did not renounce their faith. Four days later the priests, nuns, seminarians, and Christian lay workers were all murdered as part of what was called the Taiyuan massacre. It is estimated that 250 foreigners died during the Boxer rebellion. Some of these were embassy staff, but most were missionaries. It is thought that 100,000 Chinese people may have died.

Marie-Hermine was beatified by Pope Pius XII on 24 November 1946 and canonised by Pope John Paul II on 1 October 2000 as one of a group of 120 Martyr Saints of China.
