= Mary of the Passion =

Catholic Religious Sister, missionary, and foundress

Blessed Mary of the Passion F.M.M.
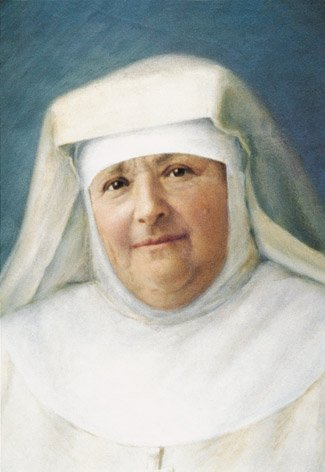

Religious, missionary and foundress
- Born: Helene-Marie-Philippine de Chappotin; 21 May 1839; Nantes, Loire Inférieure, France
- Died: November 15, 1904 (aged 65); Sanremo, Imperia, Kingdom of Italy
- Venerated in: Roman Catholicism (Third Order of St. Francis)
- Beatified: 20 October 2002, Vatican City, by Pope John Paul II
- Major shrine: Generalate of the Franciscan Missionaries of Mary, via Giusti, Rome, Italy
- Feast: 15 November

Hélène Marie Philippine de Chappotin de Neuville (Nantes, 21 May 1839 – Sanremo, 15 November 1904), known as Mary of the Passion (French: Mère Marie de la Passion), was a French religious sister and missionary, who founded the Franciscan Missionaries of Mary in British India in 1877, currently one of the largest religious institutes in the Catholic Church.

== Early life ==
Helene-Marie-Philippine de Chappotin was born in 1839 in Nantes, then in the Department of Loire Inférieure, part of the region of Brittany. The death of her two sisters and a beloved cousin affected her deeply and drove her to seek the meaning of life, guided by the strong beliefs of her mother. During a spiritual retreat in April 1856, she had a deep experience of God's love and a call to serve God, which was to guide her for the rest of her life.

As a result of this experience, she determined to commit her life to religious service. However in 1859, when Helene was twenty years of age, her mother died suddenly and she took on the responsibilities of mistress of the household. In December 1860, with the permission of the Bishop of Nantes, de Chappotin entered the local monastery of the Poor Clares, whose ideal of Franciscan simplicity and poverty drew her. On the following 23 January, while still a postulant, she had a profound experience of God's inviting her to offer herself as a victim for the Church and for the pope. She soon fell ill, however, and had to leave the monastery.

== Religious life ==
In the spring of 1864, when Chappotin had recovered her health, on the advice of her confessor, she entered the monastery of the Sisters of Mary Reparatrix, a religious congregation just recently founded in 1857 by Mother Mary of Jesus, which had opened a house in Toulouse in 1860. They were an enclosed religious order, dedicated to contemplation and the training of women in Ignatian spirituality through the experience of the Spiritual Exercises.

On 15 August 1860, she received the religious habit of the congregation and was given the new religious name of Mary of the Passion. Before the end of her novitiate, however, she was assigned to accompany a group of the Sisters to the Vicariate Apostolic of Madurai in India, which was under the administration of the Society of Jesus. There, in addition to their own apostolate, they were to help establish a native congregation of Religious Sisters. It was there that Sister Mary of the Passion made her first religious vows in the congregation on 3 May 1866.

Due to the many talents she had shown, she had gained the confidence of Mother Mary of Jesus, the foundress, and was immediately named the Superior of the community. When she made her final and permanent religious profession a year later, she was appointed as the Provincial Superior of the three communities of the Sisters of Mary Reparatrix in the Vicariate. Under her leadership, some tensions which had previously been experienced by the various communities were apparently ironed out and the work of the congregation began to flourish. Growth reached a point where she was able to staff a new convent in Oocatamund (Udhagamandalam), Tamil Nadu, a popular hill station deep in the Nilgiri mountains, located in the Vicariate Apostolic of Diocese of Coimbatore, established under the authority of the Paris Foreign Missions Society.

The tensions which the communities in Madurai had previously exhibited, however, arose again in 1876. This time Mother Mary was unable to resolve them. The 33 Sisters of the Province were forced to choose between testifying against her and her advisory council or leaving the congregation. As a result, 20 of the Sisters left, including Mother Mary of the Passion. They gathered in the new convent in Oocatamund — which was the property of the Vicariate, and, with the approval of the local Vicar Apostolic, resolved to continue their commitment in a new community. Mother Mary then traveled to Rome to secure the permission of the Holy See for this new foundation. On 6 January 1877, she obtained the approval of Pope Pius IX for the group, which was to have an entirely missionary orientation. They took the name of Missionaries of Mary, with Mother Mary of the Passion elected as their Superior.

Mother Mary's vision was to maintain their commitment to a life in which the Sisters combined contemplative prayer with their service. One characteristic which the new congregation adopted, which distinguished it from their previous one, was the provision of medical care to the local people, especially for the women of India, who were strictly segregated from men in the traditional system of purdah. Mother Mary had seen the need for this and, as women themselves, the Sisters began to visit homes where they could enter the parts restricted to females.

At the suggestion of the Sacred Congregation of Propaganda Fide, responsible for all activities of the Church in non-Catholic countries, Mother Mary opened a novitiate for the new congregation in Saint-Brieuc, in her native region of Brittany in France. The response was great and soon many young women entered the congregation for service overseas.

== Franciscan foundress ==
Mother Mary had to return to Rome in 1880 to resolve some legal difficulties for the congregation. She had to return yet again in June 1882, and this visit was to prove pivotal in the identity of the congregation. Firstly, she was given approval to open a house in Rome itself, which was a great honor. Secondly, she came into contact with the Minister General of the Order of Friars Minor. As a consequence, she was able to return to her Franciscan roots, and was received into the Third Order of St. Francis at the Franciscan Church of Ara Coeli on the following 4 October, the feast day of Saint Francis of Assisi.

A period of trial began in March 1883, when allegations arose against Mother Mary. She was removed from office and ordered not to communicate with the Sisters in India. An inquiry was ordered by Pope Leo XIII, in which she was cleared of all charges. At their General Chapter held in July 1884, she was re-elected as the Superior General of the Institute.

The Institute continued to grow. On 12 August 1885 they received official recognition as a congregation by the Holy See, at which time they also adopted the Rule of the Franciscan Third Order Regular. They then became the Franciscan Missionaries of Mary. Their Constitutions received final approval in 1896.

The Franciscan Missionaries began to be sent out to a number of countries, wherever there was need, even the remotest locations known. They undertook these assignments often facing great personal risk. In 1900, Mother Mary had the experience of losing the community of Sisters in Taiyuan, China, who were executed during the Boxer Rebellion. These 7 Franciscan Missionaries of Mary were canonized in A.D. 2000.

== Death and veneration ==
Mary of the Passion remained in office as Superior General of the Institute until her death. Worn out, she died after a brief illness in the town of Sanremo in 1904, at the age of 65. At that point, there were 2,000 Franciscan Missionaries of Mary serving in 86 communities on four continents. She was buried in the chapel of the General Motherhouse in Rome.

In 1918, an inquiry into the life of Mother Mary was opened by the Diocese of Ventimiglia, in whose territory she had died. Her cause was formally opened on 30 June 1923, granting her the title of Servant of God. The unexplained healing of a Franciscan Missionary of Mary from Pott disease was judged as miraculous and due to her intercession. She was beatified by Pope John Paul II, on 20 October 2002, observed that year as World Mission Day in the Catholic Church.

== Legacy ==
Currently there are about 6,700 Franciscan Missionaries of Mary, citizens of 80 nations, serving in 76 countries around the globe.
