= Franciscan Missionaries of Mary =

Catholic religious institute

- Franciscaines missionnaires de Marie
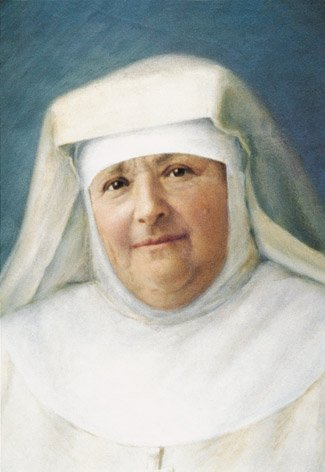
- Blessed Mary of the Passion; Foundress
- Abbreviation: F.M.M
- Formation: 1877; 149 years ago
- Founder: Hélène de Chappotin (Blessed Mary of the Passion, F.M.M.)
- Founded at: Ootacamund, Tamil Nadu, India
- Type: Centralized Religious Institute of Consecrated Life of Pontifical Right for Women
- Headquarters: General House; Via Giusti, 12; 00185 Rome, Italy
- Members: 5,000 members as of 2024
- Superior General: Sr. Eufemia Glenny, F.M.M.
- Website: fmm.org
- Formerly called: Missionaries of Mary

The Franciscan Missionaries of Mary are a Catholic centralized religious institute of consecrated life of Pontifical Right for women founded by Mother Mary of the Passion (born Hélène Marie Philippine de Chappotin de Neuville, 1839–1904) at Ootacamund, then British India, in 1877. The missionaries form an international religious congregation of women representing 77 nationalities spread over 74 countries on five continents.

== Foundation ==
Chappotin, while still a novice of the Sisters of Mary Reparatrix, a congregation dedicated to the training of women in the spirit of Ignatius of Loyola, had been sent in 1865 from France to the apostolic vicariate of Madurai in British India, which was under the administration of the Society of Jesus. They had been requested to help train a native congregation of religious sisters. After her religious profession the following year, she was appointed the provincial superior of the houses of the congregation in that country.

A dissension in the province which Chappotin had previously worked to resolve arose again. As a result, 20 of the sisters left the congregation, including Chappotin. They gathered in a convent in Ootacamund, which she had recently established. They formed a new community there under the authority of the local vicar apostolic.

These women resolved to form a new congregation, and Chappotin traveled to Rome that November to seek permission for this from the Holy See. She obtained this from Pope Pius IX on 6 January 1877, under the name of Missionaries of Mary. Unlike the instruction focus of the Sisters of Mary Reparatrix, the missionaries would carry out a ministry of providing medical care to the women of India who were unable to receive it from male doctors, due to the practice of purdah, which strictly segregated them from contact with men. Mary of the Passion had seen the consequences and felt called to deal with the situation. As women themselves, they would have access to the parts of the home restricted to females.

The Sacred Congregation of the Propaganda Fide, which supervised all church activities in non-Catholic territories, suggested to her that she open a novitiate in her native France, to train recruits for the new congregation. In keeping with this, one was opened in Saint-Brieuc, and new vocations to the missionaries came quickly.

Chappotin had to return to Rome in 1880 to resolve issues about the new foundation. She had to make yet another voyage there in June 1882. This one was to be a turning point in the identity of the missionaries. Firstly, they were granted permission to open a house in Rome itself. Secondly, Mary of the Passion came into contact with Bernardino of Portogruaro, the Minister General of the Order of Friars Minor (The Franciscans). Under his guidance, on 4 October that year (the feast day of St. Francis of Assisi), she was admitted to the Third Order of St. Francis, which was a return to the Franciscan vocation to which she had felt called when she was briefly a candidate in a monastery of the Poor Clares early in her life. The new congregation formally adopted the Rule of the Franciscan Third Order Regular on 15 August 1885. At that time they took the name of Franciscan Missionaries of Mary.

== Expansion ==
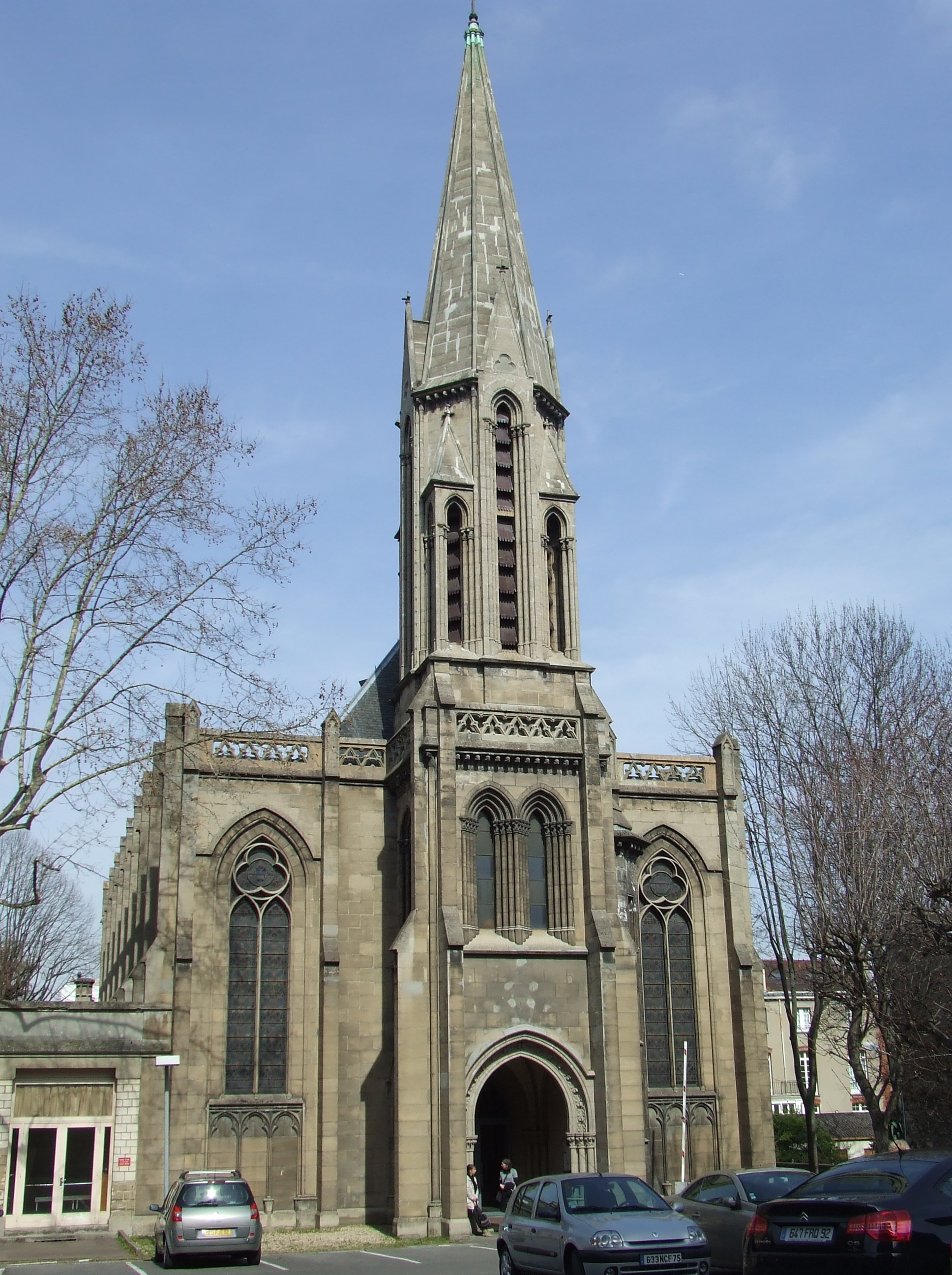
Chapel St. Joan of Arc, mother house in Paris.

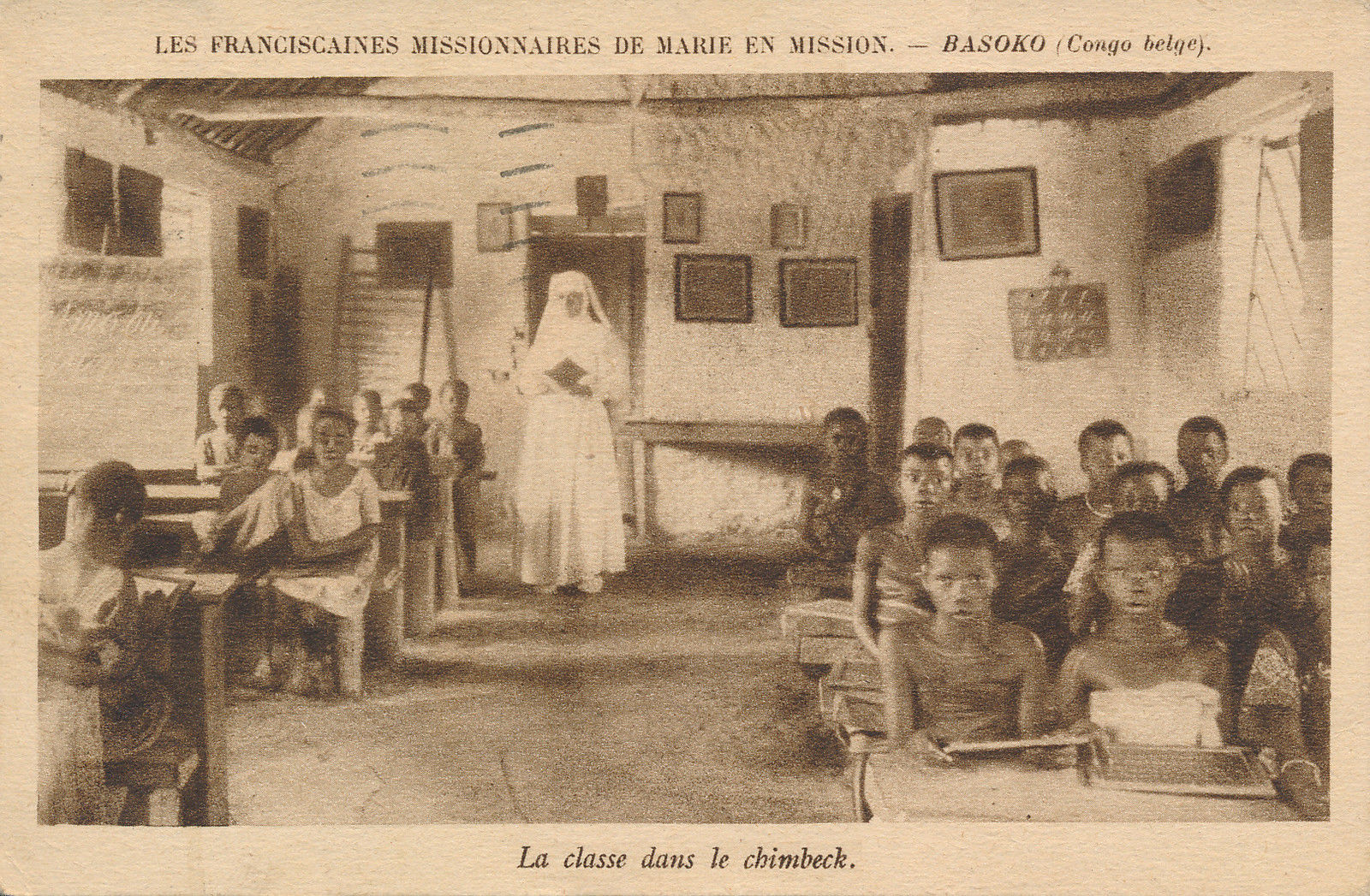
Education by the Franciscan Missionaries of Mary in Belgian Congo (circa 1930)

The work of the Franciscan Missionaries quickly spread to other countries, including China. It was there, in 1900, that seven Franciscan Missionaries of Mary were murdered during the Boxer Rebellion, in which missionaries throughout that country were killed. These Sisters were canonized in 2000 as among the Martyrs of China. The canonized Sisters were:

- Marie-Hermine of Jesus (in saeculo: Irma Grivot)
- Marie de la Paix Giuliani (in saeculo: Mary Ann Giuliani)
- Maria Chiara Nanetti (in saeculo: Clelia Nanetti)
- Marie of Saint Natalie (in saeculo: Joan Mary Kerguin)
- Marie of Saint Just (in saeculo: Ann Moreau)
- Marie-Adolphine (in saeculo: Ann Dierk)
- Mary Amandine (in saeculo: Paula Jeuris)

Maria Assunta Pallotta, who died in China in 1905, was beatified in 1954.

By the time of Chappotin's death in 1904, there were 88 communities serving in 24 countries around the globe, serving a variety of services for women and children. There was a mission at Fantome Island, near Palm Island, Queensland as well as a leprosarium.

=== United States ===
In November 1903, seven Sisters from Canada, Ireland and France arrived in Worcester, Massachusetts, in response to a request for Sisters to minister among the many immigrant families from Canada. The following year, Bishop Matthew Harkins of the Diocese of Providence invited them to come to Woonsocket to serve families who worked in the mills.

In 1937 the Franciscan Missionaries of Mary assumed responsibility for the McMahon Memorial Temporary Shelter, where children forcibly removed from homes would be housed until more permanent situations could be found. This has now become McMahon Services for Children St. Francis Hospital in Flower Hill, New York, the only specialized cardiac care facility in New York, was founded by them in 1922. In Boston, Massachusetts, the Franciscan Missionaries accepted responsibility for the pediatric hospital founded in 1949 by Cardinal Richard Cushing, funded by Joseph P. Kennedy Sr., and his wife Rose. It is now known as Franciscan Children's.

=== Malta ===
The Franciscan Missionaries of Mary came to Malta in 1911 from Portugal. The Missionaries have been based in Balzan since 1920.

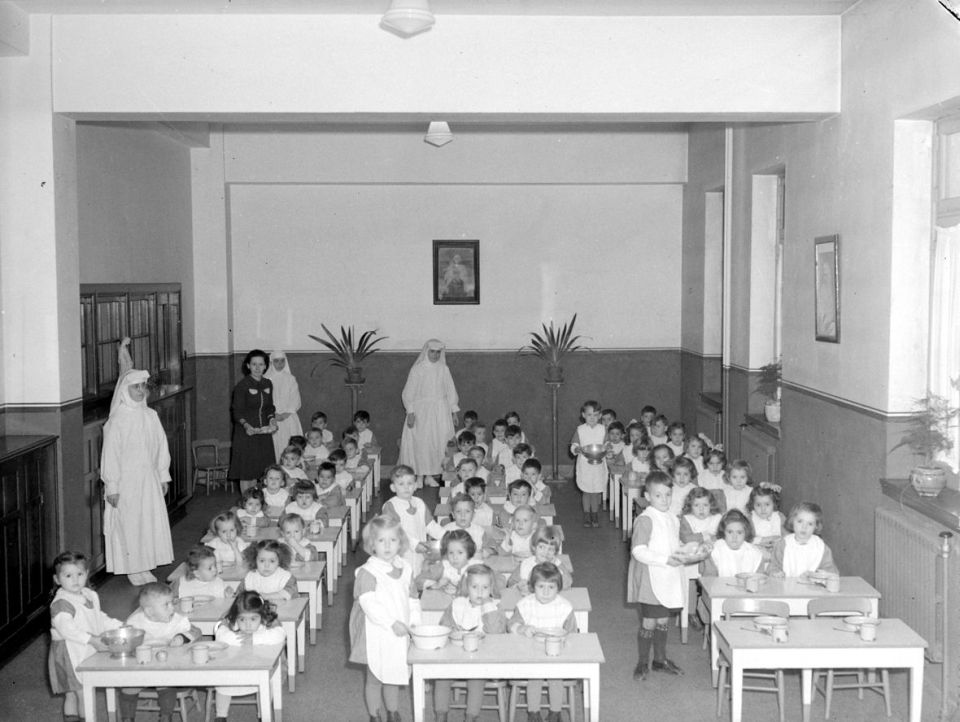
Franciscan Missionaries of Mary Kindergarten School in Montreal in 1943

== Current status ==
As of 2024, the Franciscan Missionaries of Mary formed the fifth largest religious institute for women in the Catholic Church, with nearly 5,000 members serving in 74 countries. Medical care centers have been opened worldwide. Cardinal Hayes Home in Millbrook, New York has been sponsored by the FMM since 1941 It provides residential care and treatment for developmentally disabled children and young adults in its Millbrook location and in five community homes in Dutchess County. In 2018, the Catholic Extension Lumen Christi award was given to Sister Marie-Paule Willem, a Franciscan Missionary of Mary, serving in the Diocese of Las Cruces, New Mexico, honored a lifetime of missionary work.

== Schools ==
- Assunta Secondary School (SMK (P) Assunta), Petaling Jaya, Malaysia
- Ave Maria College, Melbourne, Australia
- Hai Sing Catholic School (formerly Hai Sing Girls' High School), Singapore
- Holy Angels Anglo Indian Higher Secondary School, Chennai, India
- Regina Pacis School, Jakarta/Bogor, Indonesia
- Mater Dei School, New Delhi, India
- Rosary Convent High School, Hyderabad, India
- Rosary Matriculation Higher Secondary School, Chennai, India
- Sacred Heart Girls' Higher Secondary School, Thanjavur, India
- St Agnes Catholic High School, Sydney, Australia
- Fatima Girls High School, Kazipet, India
- St. Francis Anglo-Indian Girls School, Coimbatore, India
- St. Lawrence's Girls' School, Karachi, Pakistan
- Stella Maris College, Cubao/Oroquieta, Philippines
- Stella Maris College, Chennai, Tamil Nadu, India
- Nazareth Convent High School, Ooty, Tamil Nadu, India
- St. Rose of Lima’s College, Hong Kong, China
- Collegio de Santa Rosa de Lima, Macau, China
- St Mary's Missionaries Franciscan School, Damascus, Syria
- St. Joseph Academy of Sariaya, Quezon, Sariaya, Quezon, Philippines
- Kindergarten and Primary School Xaverius 1, Jambi, Indonesia

== Institutions ==
- Assunta Hospital, Petaling Jaya, Malaysia
- St. Francis Hospital, New York, United States
- Franciscan Children's, Boston, United States
- St. Joseph's Hospital, Baramulla, India
- St. Theresia Hospital, Jambi , Indonesia

== Notable sisters ==
- Saint Amandina of Schakkebroek.
- Saint Marie-Adolphine.
- Saint Marie of Saint Just.
- Saint Marie of Saint Natalie.
- Saint Marie-Hermine of Jesus.
- Blessed Mary of the Passion.
- Françoise Massy, high-ranking woman in the Roman curia.
- Saint Maria Chiara Nanetti.
- Irene O'Connor, musician.
- Theresia Unno, founder of the Filipino-Japanese Foundation of Northern Luzon.
- Henriette Gascuel, knight of the Order of Public Health and of the National Order of Merit for her contributions to pediatrics in Réunion.
