= Gregorio Grassi =

Christian saint

Saint Gregory Grassi O.F.M.
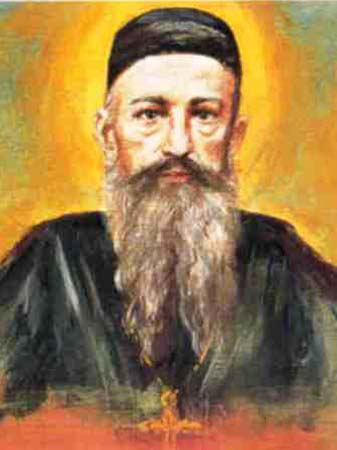

Religious, Bishop and Martyr
- Born: 13 December 1833; Castellazzo Bormida, Piedmont, Kingdom of Sardinia
- Died: 9 July 1900 (aged 66); Taiyuan, Shanxi, Qing China
- Venerated in: Catholic Church
- Beatified: 27 November 1946 by Pope Pius XII
- Canonized: 1 October 2000 by Pope John Paul II
- Feast: 9 July

Gregory Mary Grassi, O.F.M., (in Italian language Gregorio Maria Grassi) (13 December 1833 – 9 July 1900) was an Italian Franciscan friar and bishop who is honored as a Catholic martyr and saint.

He is one of the 120 Martyrs of China who were canonized on 1 October 2000 by Pope John Paul II.

== Early life and mission ==
He was born Pier Luigi Grassi in Castellazzo Bormida, in the Piedmont region of Italy, on 13 December 1833.

At the age of 15, on 2 November 1848, he took the Franciscan habit in the Friary of Montiano, Romagna, with the name Gregory. His solemn profession was made one year later, on 14 December. He was then sent to Bologna to do his seminary studies, and was ordained priest on 17 August 1856 in Mirandola.

Then he was sent to Rome for further training to prepare for his mission to China.

In 1860, Grassi was assigned to Taiyuan, China, where he was appointed Mission Promoter, Director of the mission orphanage, and choirmaster at the seminary there.

On 25 January 1876, he was chosen as the Coadjutor Vicar Apostolic for the Apostolic Vicariate of Shanxi. On 17 June 1891, he assumed authority over the Apostolic Vicariate of Northern Shanxi. On 6 September 1891, he established a novitiate to provide access to Franciscan life for the Chinese of all four vicariates in Shanxi and a rest home for overworked missionaries.

He also dealt with the suffering of the local population brought on by plague and famine, which led him to enlarge the orphanage in the city and establish several others, in order to cope with the orphans left behind by these catastrophes.

== Martyrdom ==
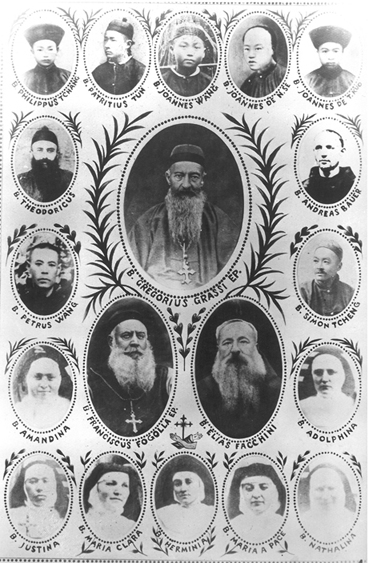
Franciscan Martyrs of Shanxi

When the short but bloody Boxer Rebellion broke out in Peking in June 1900, and the Empress Dowager Cixi issued the Imperial Decree of declaration of war against foreign powers, Grassi was urged to flee. He responded, "Ever since I was twelve, I have desired and also asked God for martyrdom. Now that this longed-for hour has come, must I run away?"

At the beginning of July, the Provincial Governor of Shanxi, Yuxian, ordered the arrest of the European missionaries in the province. On 4 July, a mob attacked the Franciscan mission in Hengyang (southern Hunan), murdering one of the friars, Cesidio Giacomantonio, and burning the mission to the ground. A few days later, on 7 July, the friar who served as Apostolic Vicar of Southern Hunan, bishop Antonio Fantosati, and his companion, the friar Giuseppe Maria Gambario, were attacked while returning to the mission in Hengyang. Both were killed.

On 27 June 1900, Grassi described the situation of Christians in the Shanxi province in a letter, saying, "The European establishments... are seriously threatened by the mob, united with the Boxers and the soldiers: a catastrophe could occur at any moment. The gates of the city are open, but they are guarded by the Boxers, who prevent the travel of Christians. Now, in the outskirts, we are in the throes of a real revolution: nothing and no one can be said to be safe." During the night of 5 July 1900, Grassi, along with fellow bishop Francis Fogolla, three friars, seven Franciscan Missionaries of Mary, 11 Chinese members of the Third Order of St. Francis, of whom six were seminarians, and three employees of the Taiyuan Mission were imprisoned by Boxer forces.

On 9 July 1900, Grassi, along with the rest, was escorted from prison with his hands bound behind his back to a public trial presided over by Yuxian. After a show trial, the group was sentenced to death. Grassi was stripped naked before a crowd of onlookers, and Yuxian himself cut Grassi to pieces with a sword. His heart was removed from his body and delivered to Chinese Buddhist monks so that they could study its alleged occult powers. By custom, Grassi's head was severed from his corpse so that it could be put on display in a small cage at the city entrance. What remained of his corpse, along with the corpses of all the others killed that day, was tossed over the city wall and left unburied so that dogs would eat the remains. These killings are known as the Taiyuan massacre.

Throughout China during the Boxer Uprising, 5 bishops, 50 priests, 2 brothers, 15 sisters and 40,000 Chinese Christians were killed.

The 146,575 Catholics served by the Franciscans in China in 1906 had grown to 303,760 by 1924 and were served by 282 Franciscans and 174 local priests.

== Veneration ==
Grassi, along with his companions Fogolla and Fantosati, was beatified by Pope Pius XII on 24 November 1946. The cause for their canonization was opened on 25 February 1949, and they were declared saints on 1 October 2000 by Pope John Paul II.

== See also ==
- Martyr Saints of China

== Sources and further reading ==
- Clark, Anthony E. (2011). China's Saints: Catholic Martyrdom During the Qing (1644-1911). Bethlehem PA; Lanham, Md.: Lehigh University Press; Rowman & Littlefield. ISBN 9781611460162.
