= China Martyrs of 1900 =

Christians killed in the Boxer Rebellion

A few of the martyrs of the C.I.M. in 1900.

The "China Martyrs of 1900" is a term used by some Protestant Christians to refer to American and European missionaries and converts who were murdered during the Boxer Rebellion, when Boxers carried out violent attacks targeting Christians and foreigners in northern China.

== Events ==
At least 189 Protestant missionaries and 500 native Chinese Protestant Christians were murdered in 1900 alone. Though some missionaries considered themselves non-denominationally Protestant, among those killed were Baptists, Evangelical, Anglicans, Lutherans, Methodists, Presbyterians and Plymouth Brethren.

The murder of eleven Anglican missionaries and their children on August 1, 1895 in Huashan, Fujian Province foreshadowed the devastation. Foreigners, their religion, and spiritual disruptions associated with new railroad and telegraph lines were all blamed for the unusually severe flooding of the Yellow River annually since 1896, as well as the Yangtze River's flooding in 1898, and drought across north China in the spring of 1900—all of which led to famine and ultimately violence. Chinese also vehemently objected to foreign political interference (having lost the First Sino-Japanese War in 1895), the opium trade, and economic manipulations against Chinese interests.

The China Inland Mission, which lost 58 adult missionaries and 21 children in 1900, had the highest losses of any missionary agency that year. Several died in the Taiyuan Massacre; Catholic and Baptist missionaries were also decapitated in the Shanxi Province's capitol on July 9 and 11 after travelling there under the governor's orders and nominal guarantees of protection. In 1901, when the allied nations demanded compensation from the Chinese government, Hudson Taylor, a British Protestant Christian missionary to China and founder of the China Inland Mission (CIM) (later Overseas Missionary Fellowship, now OMF International), refused to accept payment for loss of property or life in order to demonstrate the meekness of Christ to the Chinese. The funds instead went to found the Shansi Imperial University, whose first chancellor was the Baptist missionary Timothy Richard. other reparations founded Tsinghua University in Beijing.

The Christian and Missionary Alliance lost 36 people in its North China missions in 1900, including 21 missionaries, 12 children and three Chinese Christian assistants.

Seventy American missionaries (including spouses and children) and a large number of British missionaries took refuge in the British legation in Beijing during the Siege of the International Legations. All of them survived the siege, although British missionary, Joseph Stonehouse, was killed in the aftermath of the siege, the last missionary to die in the Boxer Rebellion.

The decapitation of missionary and Yale graduate Horace Tracy Pitkin in Baoding led to the founding of the Yale China Mission, the papers of which remain a significant research source concerning early 20th century Chinese history. Another large collection of missionary papers is in London.

== See also ==
- Chinese Martyrs
- Martyr Saints of China
- The Sheo Yang Mission
- Jessie Pigott
