= Mitrofan =

Mitrofan or Mytrofan (Cyrillic: Митрофан) is a Slavic masculine given name and a Romanian surname derived from Greek Ancient Greek: Μητροφάνης : μήτηρ 'mother' + φαίνω, 'appear, shine'. Its English equivalent is Metrophanes.

Derived names: Mitrokha/Mitroha/Mitroshka, Russian diminutive; Mitrofanushka, Russian hypocoristic.

Derived patronymics: Mitrofanovich (masculine), Mitrofanovna (feminine).

Derived surnames: Mitrofanov/Mitrofanova, Russian; Mitrokhin/Mitrokhina, Russian; Mitrofanenko/Mytrofanenko, Ukrainian; Mitrofanenkov

In Russian culture, the name "Mitrofanushka" may refer to an uneducated and ill-mannered young man, who refuses to improve himself, after the protagonist of the 1872 comedy The Minor by Denis Fonvizin.

Notable people with the name include:

== Given name ==
- Mitrofan I, Metropolitan of Hungary and Wallachia
- Mitrofan II, Metropolitan of Hungary and Wallachia
- Mitrophan of Voronezh, an Orthodox Saint and bishop
- Mitrofan Ban, Montenegrin bishop
- Mitrofan Cioban, a Moldovan mathematician
- Mitrofan Belyayev, a Russian music publisher, founder of the Glinka prize
- Mitrofan Dovnar-Zapolsky, a Belarusian historian and ethnographer
- Mitrofan Grekov
- Mitrofan Grodzitsky
- Mitrofan Kodić
- Mitrofan Lodyzhensky
- Mitrofan Moskalenko
- Mitrofan Nadein
- Mitrofan Nedelin, Soviet military commander
- Mitrofan Pyatnitsky, a Russian musician
- Mitrofan Tchaikovsky
- Mytrofan Yavdas, Ukrainian Autocephalous Orthodox protoiereus (archpriest) and religious author

== Surname ==
- Ioan Mitrofan (1929-2002), Romanian archaeologist and historian
- Mihai Mitrofan
- Sandu Mitrofan

== Fictional characters ==
- Mitrofanushka, the central character of the 1782 Russian comedy play The Minor by Fonvizin
