= NVA =

NVA may refer to:

== Organisations ==
=== Military ===
- National People's Army, East Germany (1956–1990; German: Nationale Volksarmee)
- Normandy Veterans' Association, of 1944 Allied D-Day troops (1981–2014)
- North Vietnamese Army (or People's Army of Vietnam)

=== Political parties ===
- De Nederlandse Alliantie, Netherlands (formed 2026; formerly Nederlandse Vrijheids Alliantie)
- New Flemish Alliance, Belgium (formed 2001; Dutch: Nieuw-Vlaamse Alliantie)

=== Other organisations ===
- NVA (arts organisation), a Scottish charity (1992–2018)
- National Volleyball Association, an American sports league (formed 2017)

== Places ==
- Benito Salas Airport, Colombia (IATA:NVA)
- Native Village of Afognak, an Alutiiq tribe in Alaska, United States
- Native Village of Akhiok, another Alutiiq tribe in Alaska

== Other uses ==
- NVA (film), a 2005 German comedy
- No value added, a management term
- Nonivamide, a spicy food additive
- Network virtual appliance, in computer networking
