= Francis Fogolla =

Italian bishop and Catholic saint

Saint Francesco Fogolla O.F.M.
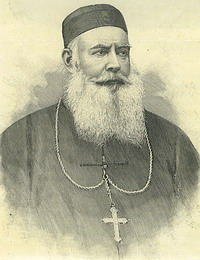

Bishop and Martyr
- Born: 4 October 1839; Mulazzo, Italy
- Died: 9 July 1900 (aged 60); Taiyuan, China
- Honored in: Roman Catholic Church
- Beatified: 27 November 1946 by Pope Pius XII
- Canonized: 1 October 2000 by Pope John Paul II
- Feast: 9 July
- Patronage: Booksellers

Francesco Fogolla (4 October 1839 – 9 July 1900), known in Chinese as Fu Zhujiao, was an Italian missionary prelate belonging to the Order of Friars Minor. On 28 June 1898, Fogolla was appointed titular bishop of Bageis and coadjutor bishop of Northern Shanxi, China. Fogolla was killed at the Taiyuan Massacre of 9 July 1900 during the Boxer Rebellion. He is considered a martyr by the Catholic Church and is venerated as a saint.

== Early life ==
He was born Francesco Antonio Domenico Fogolla to parents Gioacchino and Elisabetta Ferrari on 4 October 1839 in the Tuscan town of Mulazzo. On 1 November 1856, Fogolla was admitted into the Order of Friars Minor at the Abbey of St Maria del Monte. On 14 September 1857, he fell ill and was sent away to live with his parents, who now lived in Parma. Upon recovery, he resumed novitiate and ordained a priest on 19 September 1862.

== Mission ==
In 1866, Fogolla requested to become a missionary. On 13 December 1866, the Congregation for the Evangelization of Peoples approved him for service. Fogolla arrived in China on 30 May 1867. After travelling the region, he arrived at his first permanent assignment was at the Datong missions in December, where he cared for a community of about 700 Catholics. He was known to preach in public, a practice which led to his imprisonment for two days in 1870 as it was believed he caused street riots. Over the seven years following this arrest, he was assigned to various missions in Shanxi, including Pingyao, where he developed exception skill with the Chinese language. In 1877, the Congregation for the Evangelization of Peoples divided the Shanxi vicariate into two parts. Fogolla was appointed Coadjutor Vicar Apostolic of the Apostolic Vicariate of Southern Shanxi, which has since become the Roman Catholic Diocese of Lu'an. This position placed 13,150 Catholics under his supervision, including 17 European missionaries and 15 indigenous Chinese priests.

In 1879, with financial support from both the Congregation for the Evangelization of Peoples and the laity from within his Vicariate, he began constructing a church dedicated to the Sacred Heart in Changzhi. In the same year, Catholic priests were assigned legal defense responsibilities for those over whom they had pastoral responsibilities. Fogolla quickly became a skilled defender of the rights of Chinese Christians. He successfully defended full educational rights for Christians, allowing them to qualify for all positions in public office. On 6 June 1880, the first Chinese regional synods convened, for which Fogolla was the chief preacher. On 8 September 1884, he attended the consecration of the Church of the Sacred Heart, a church which would later become the cathedral for the Diocese of Lu'an/Changzhi. On 28 September 1885, he was appointed rector and professor at the major seminary for the Shanxi province, located in Taiyuan. With this position, he oversaw the education of 20 students as well as the construction of an orphanage.

On 2 November 1897, Fogolla left China for the first time in over thirty years as he embarked for Turin, Italy. There, he represented the Catholics of the Shanxi province at the General Italian Exhibition of 1898. At such exhibitions, missionaries, many of whom belonged to the Order of Friars Minor, would showcase the cultures of the peoples of their missions. It was expected that missionaries bring sacred art specific to their missions as proof of evangelization. He remained in Europe until 12 March 1899, during which time he solicited new missionaries for the Shanxi province, aided cartographers in the creation of regional Chinese maps, and sold a collection of Chinese floral fossils to Turinese geologists. On 28 June 1898, while in Paris, Fogolla was appointed titular bishop of Bageis and coadjutor bishop of Shanxi, China. He was also given the right of succession after Bishop Gregory Mary Grassi, the then current Bishop of Shanxi and friend of his who had held the position since 17 June 1891. Fogolla left Europe out of Marseille on 12 March 1899 with the added company of eight new nuns and nine new missionaries. He returned to Taiyuan on 4 May 1899.

== Death ==
In accordance with the Boxer Rebellion, Yuxian, the provincial governor of Shanxi province, implemented harsh legislation aimed at the detriment of foreigners, Catholics, Protestants, and the Orthodox. A contemporary of Fogolla's, Fr. Manini, wrote that Yuxian was, "a man of austere customs... a fanatic worshipper of idols, in honor of whom he fasted for long times, enlivened by a ferocious hatred of Christians and Europeans, by brutal cruelty." Severe persecution of Christians in the Shanxi province began in May 1900 with baseless accusations of bringing rats to the towns and cities, violence against children, desecration of corpses, sale of Chinese children into slavery in Europe. Fogolla, among others, defended the Christians against such accusations in court. However, such defense was to little avail as Yuxian continued to instate harsher legislation.

On 2 July 1900, more than 200 orphans were kidnapped from the orphanage at Taiyuan seminary and imprisoned. Three days later, during the night of 5 July 1900, an army of Boxers arrived at the Taiyuan Mission and took away Bishops Francesco Fogolla and Gregorio Grassi, as well as all of the friars, seminarians, and servants. After a fixed trial, the entire group was convicted of having deceived the judicial system with penalty of death.

On 9 July 1900, Fogolla, along with the rest, was escorted from prison with his hands bound behind his back to an audience with Yuxian. After a second false trial, their death sentences were confirmed. Fogolla was stripped naked and taken out in front of a crowd of onlookers where Yuxian himself cut Fogolla to pieces by the sword. His heart was removed from his body and delivered to Chinese Buddhist monks so that they might study its alleged occult powers. By custom, Fogolla's head was severed from his corpse so that it could be put on display in a small cage at the city entrance. What remained of his corpse, along with the corpses of all the others killed that day, were tossed over the city wall and left unburied so that dogs would eat the remains.

== Veneration ==
Fogolla, along with his companions Grassi and Fantosati, was beatified by Pope Pius XII on 24 November 1946. The cause for their canonization was opened on 25 February 1949, and they were declared saints on 1 October 2000 by Pope John Paul II.

== In Art ==
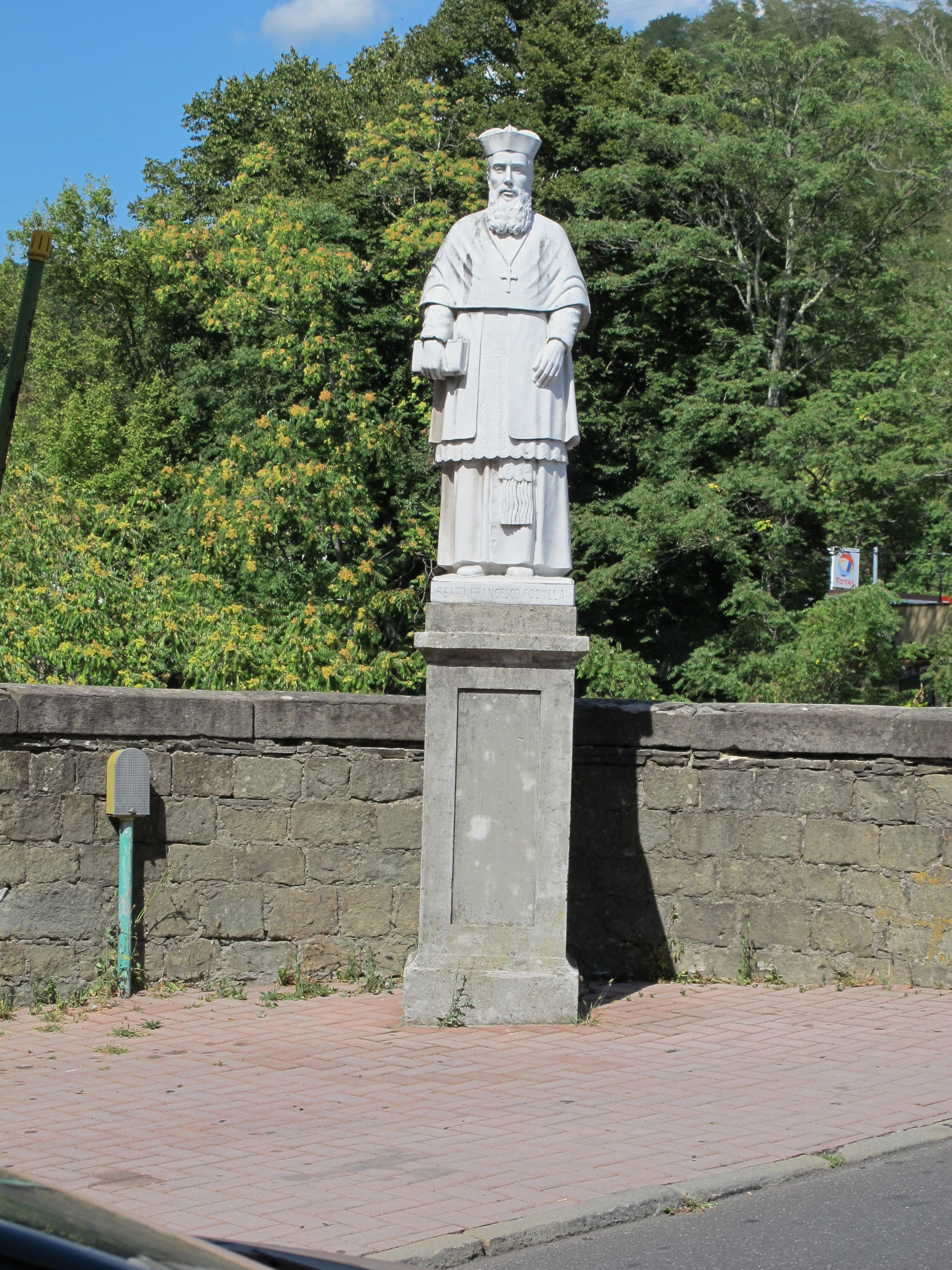
Marble statue of St. Francesco Fogollo at the Bridge of the Four Saints in Pontremoli, Italy.

== See also ==
- Martyr Saints of China
