= Netherlands Chinese Evangelization Society =

The Netherlands Chinese Evangelization Society was a Dutch Protestant Christian missionary society that was involved in sending workers to China during the late Qing dynasty. It was founded by Karl Gützlaff.

== See also ==
- The Chinese Evangelization Society (British)
- Protestant missionary societies in China during the 19th Century
