= SXU =

SXU may refer to:

- Saint Xavier University in Chicago, Illinois
- Shanxi University in Shanxi Province, China
- Simple X Unlocked
- Synergistic eXecution Unit

sxu is the ISO 639 language code for Upper Saxon German.
