= Liu Shiduan =

- Traditional Chinese: 劉士端
- Simplified Chinese: 刘士端
Transcriptions
Standard Mandarin
- Hanyu Pinyin: Liú Shìduān
- Wade–Giles: Liu^{2} Shih^{4}-tuan^{1}

Liu Shiduan (died 1896) was the founder and leader of the Big Swords Society. It was a martial arts society whose main task was to protect the property of landowners in Caozhou prefecture (southwestern Shandong province) in late Qing China.

Well educated during his youth, Liu owned about 100 mu of land in a village called Shaobing Liuzhuang. In his thirties, he learned a kung-fu technique of invulnerability called the "Armor of the Golden Bell" from a visiting martial artist and soon started teaching it to his own disciples. They formed the Big Swords Society in the early 1890s, sometime before 1895. Although the local government was fearful of the heterodox nature of the Golden Bell rituals, it tolerated the Big Swords because they assisted in repressing a wave of banditry in 1895 and 1896. In early 1896, however, Liu and the Big Swords got embroiled in conflicts with local Catholic communities. Liu did not participate actively, but in June 1896 he dispatched one of his lieutenants to northern Jiangsu to help the Pang lineage in their struggle for land against a clan that had joined the Catholic Church for protection. With their ranks swollen by locals who were not members of the Society, Big Swords discipline broke down as they burned the houses of local converts and looted shops that did not belong to Christians. When the local government, led by judicial commissioner Yuxian, moved in to suppress the movement, Liu was arrested and beheaded.

Because they practiced rituals of invulnerability and because of their anti-Christian activities, Liu's Big Swords are considered precursors of the Boxer Uprising that unfolded in north China from 1899 to 1901.

== Youth ==
Liu Shiduan was born in Shan County in Caozhou (Shandong Province). According to his descendants, he was 43 when he died in 1896, so he may have been born in 1853 or 1854. He lived in a village called Shaobing Liuzhuang (燒餅劉莊). From 7 to 20 sui Liu attended school; he tried, but failed, to pass the lowest level (xiucai) of the imperial examination.

Liu owned more than 100 mu of land – 50 times more than was needed in that area for one person to survive – and was chief of the most influential family in his village. After failing the examination, he lived on his estates, where he frequently entertained guests and became known for his generosity to other locals.

== Martial arts and the Big Swords Society ==
When Liu was in his thirties, he learned combat skills from a martial artist surnamed Zhao who had come from the west, probably from the neighboring province of Zhili. Zhao taught Liu the "Armor of the Golden Bell" (simplified Chinese: 金钟罩; traditional Chinese: 金鐘罩; pinyin: Jīnzhōngzhào), an invulnerability technique that the rebels of the Eight Trigrams had used in 1813. This technique was a form of kung-fu or "hard" qigong breathing exercise which its adepts claimed could protect them against blades and even bullets as if a large bell was covering their body. Practitioners chanted secret incantations – "a son does not tell his father; a father does not tell his son" – and swallowed water magically empowered by the ashes of a paper amulet.

Possibly in the early 1890s, Liu started to teach the Golden Bell to his own disciples. His students were typically rich peasants and small landowners who planned to use their martial training to defend their properties from the increasingly well-armed bandits who roved southwestern Shandong at the time. The group first called itself "Armor of the Golden Bell", but was soon renamed the Big Swords Society. As founder, Liu Shiduan became the Big Swords' main leader. His disciples Cao Deli (曹得禮) and Peng Guilin (彭桂林), who like him were landowners, were the Society's heads in their own villages.

The departure of Shandong's local troops for the front of the Sino–Japanese War in 1894 led to a sharp increase in banditry at the junction of southwestern Shandong and northern Jiangsu. Officials disliked the "heterodox technique" of the Armor of the Golden Bell, but also distinguished between lawless bandits and the Big Swords, who defended social order. Even as the local government issued proclamations ordering the Society to disperse, Liu's Big Swords actively assisted Caozhou prefect Yuxian in putting down the bandits. In 1895, they arrested a large number of outlaws and turned them over to the authorities. Liu Shiduan himself captured a notorious bandit leader called "Rice-Grain Yue the Second" (岳二米子), earning praise from the local officials.

Buoyed by government support, the Big Sword Society now grew extremely fast. In spring 1896, it held four days of festivities for Liu Shiduan's birthday in a local temple. The celebrations were "an enormous public relations success" and confirmed the Big Swords' popularity. By then the society counted between 20,000 and 30,000 members, mostly in Shandong, but also in neighboring Henan, Anhui, and Jiangsu. Liu Shiduan was still the official leader, but the Big Swords were not linked by a tight chain of command.

== Conflicts with Christians and execution ==
Just as the Big Sword Society was growing, Christian missionaries, mostly Catholic, were also taking advantage of the weakness of the Qing government to expand their activities in Shandong. There were clashes between the Big Swords and Catholic communities, sometimes because bandits had converted to Christianity for protection. Both groups struggled over religious meaning – the Catholics doubting the efficacy of the Big Swords' invulnerability rituals, and the Big Swords resenting the Catholics' rejection of the local gods – but also over more concrete interests like power and property. In February 1896, Liu Shiduan and his main lieutenant Cao Deli were involved in a minor conflict that started when a local man tried to collect debts from a Christian convert. That man sought the help of the Big Swords, who were happy to assist him, but the commander of the local garrison intercepted Liu's forces before they had time to confront the Catholics. By then, however, "both sides were spoiling for a fight".

In 1896, a dispute for land between two lineages in northern Jiangsu caused more trouble between Catholics and Big Swords. The Pang and Liu lineages both claimed ownership of a large patch of fertile land in Dangshan County, which is now administered by Anhui province but was then in Jiangsu, just across the border from Caozhou prefecture in Shandong. To enhance their claims, the Liu lineage converted to Catholicism – French Jesuits had arrived in the area in 1890 – while the Pangs joined the Big Swords. In June 1896, the leader of the Pang lineage, Pang Sanjie, attacked the homes of converts and vandalized Christian churches with about 60 of his men. When Pang sought the help of the Shandong Big Swords, Liu Shiduan sent him his disciple Peng Guilin, but he and Cao Deli did not participate. Pang's band looted or burned the homes of Christians in neighboring villages. By the end of June, Pang Sanjie's group had grown to about 1,000 and contained a large number of locals who were not regular members of the Big Sword Society. Their discipline broke down and they started looting shops in a village on the Shandong–Jiangsu border. The local militia and government troops quickly dispersed the band, arrested Liu Shiduan's disciple Peng Guilin, and captured 13 minor leaders of the Big Swords.

Yuxian, who had recently been promoted from Caozhou prefect to Shandong judicial commissioner, was put in charge of suppressing the Big Swords. He ordered his subordinates to arrest the Society's two main leaders, Liu Shiduan and Cao Deli. The Cao county magistrate sent a militia leader who was also Liu Shiduan's friend to invite Liu to a meeting. Liu went along and was immediately arrested. Yuxian had him beheaded after interrogating him. Cao Deli was captured in a similar manner and also executed. After the beheading of its leaders, the Big Swords Society disappeared for good from southwest Shandong. Pang Sanjie, the leader of the Pang lineage, managed to escape arrest. In April 1897, he and his entire lineage converted to Christianity.

Because the Big Swords practiced rituals of invulnerability and engaged in anti-Christian violence, they are considered as precursors of the Boxer Uprising, which sometimes used the name "Big Swords" and exploded into all of north China in 1899.

== Works cited ==
- Cohen, Paul A. (1997), History in Three Keys: The Boxers as Event, Experience, and Myth, New York: Columbia University Press, ISBN 0231106505, archived from the original on 2016-08-28 – via Questia (hardcover) ISBN 0231106513 (paperback).
- Esherick, Joseph W. (1987), The Origins of the Boxer Uprising, Berkeley and Los Angeles: University of California Press.
- Lu, Yao 路遥 (1987) [1980], "The Origins of the Boxers", in David D. Buck (ed.), Recent Studies on the Boxer Movement, Armonk, NY: M. E. Sharpe.
- Naquin, Susan (1976), Millenarian Rebellion in China: The Eight Trigrams Uprising of 1813, New Haven: Yale University Press.
