= Cellular manufacturing =

Process of manufacturing

Cellular manufacturing is a process of manufacturing which is a subsection of just-in-time manufacturing and lean manufacturing encompassing group technology. The goal of cellular manufacturing is to move as quickly as possible, make a wide variety of similar products, while making as little waste as possible. Cellular manufacturing involves the use of multiple "cells" in an assembly line fashion. Each of these cells is composed of one or multiple different machines which accomplish a certain task. The product moves from one cell to the next, each station completing part of the manufacturing process. Often the cells are arranged in a "U-shape" design because this allows for the overseer to move less and have the ability to more readily watch over the entire process. One of the biggest advantages of cellular manufacturing is the amount of flexibility that it has. Since most of the machines are automatic, simple changes can be made very rapidly. This allows for a variety of scaling for a product, minor changes to the overall design, and in extreme cases, entirely changing the overall design. These changes, although tedious, can be accomplished extremely quickly and precisely.

A cell is created by consolidating the processes required to create a specific output, such as a part or a set of instructions. These cells allow for the reduction of extraneous steps in the process of creating the specific output, and facilitate quick identification of problems and encourage communication of employees within the cell in order to resolve issues that arise quickly. Once implemented, cellular manufacturing has been said to reliably create massive gains in productivity and quality while simultaneously reducing the amount of inventory, space and lead time required to create a product. It is for this reason that the one-piece-flow cell has been called "the ultimate in lean production."

== History ==
Cellular manufacturing is derivative of principles of group technology, which were proposed by American industrialist Ralph Flanders in 1925 and adopted in Russia by the scientist Sergei Mitrofanov in 1933 (whose book on the subject was translated into English in 1959). Burbidge actively promoted group technology in the 1970s. "Apparently, Japanese firms began implementing cellular manufacturing sometime in the 1970s", and in the 1980s cells migrated to the United States as an element of just-in-time (JIT) production.

One of the first English-language books to discuss cellular manufacturing, that of Hall in 1983, referred to a cell as a "U-line", for the common, or ideal, U-shaped configuration of a cell, which was "ideal" because that shape puts all cell processes and operatives into a cluster, affording high visibility and contact. By 1990 cells had come to be treated as foundation practices in JIT manufacturing, so much so that Harmon and Peterson, in their book, Reinventing the Factory, included a section entitled, "Cell: Fundamental Factory of the Future". Cellular manufacturing was carried forward in the 1990s, when just-in-time was renamed lean manufacturing. Finally, when JIT/lean became widely attractive in the service sector, cellular concepts found their way into that realm; for example, Hyer and Wemmerlöv's final chapter is devoted to office cells.

== Cell design ==
Cells are created in a workplace to facilitate flow. This is accomplished by bringing together operations or machines or people involved in a processing sequence of a products natural flow and grouping them close to one another, distinct from other groups. This grouping is called a cell. These cells are used to improve many factors in a manufacturing setting by allowing one-piece flow to occur. An example of one-piece flow would be in the production of a metallic case part that arrives at the factory from the vendor in separate pieces, requiring assembly. First, the pieces would be moved from storage to the cell, where they would be welded together, then polished, then coated, and finally packaged. All of these steps would be completed in a single cell, so as to minimize various factors (called non-value-added processes/steps) such as time required to transport materials between steps. Some common formats of single cells are: the U-shape (good for communication and quick movement of workers), the straight line, or the L-shape. The number of workers inside these formations depend on current demand and can be modulated to increase or decrease production. For example, if a cell is normally occupied by two workers and demand is doubled, four workers should be placed in the cell. Similarly, if demand halves, one worker will occupy the cell. Since cells have a variety of differing equipment, it is therefore a requirement that any employee is skilled at multiple processes.

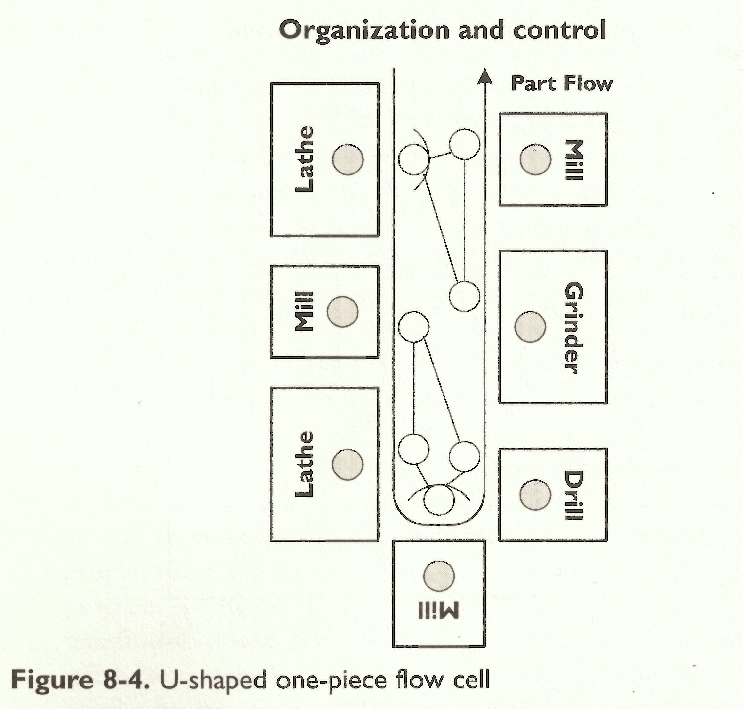
This figure from The Toyota Way shows the design of a U-shaped cell, graphing the paths of two employees through it.

While there exist many advantages to forming cells, there are some obvious benefits. It is quickly evident from observation of cells where inefficiencies lie, such as when an employee is too busy or relatively inactive. Resolving these inefficiencies can increase production and productivity by up to and above 100% in many cases. In addition to this, formation of cells consistently frees up floor space in the manufacturing/assembly environment (by having inventory only where it is absolutely required), improves safety in the work environment (due to smaller quantities of product/inventory being handled), improves morale (by imparting feelings of accomplishment and satisfaction in employees), reduces cost of inventory, and reducing inventory obsolescence.

When formation of a cell would be too difficult, a simple principle is applied in order to improve efficiencies and flow, that is, to perform processes in a specific location and gather materials to that point at a rate dictated by an average of customer demand (this rate is called the takt time). This is referred to as the Pacemaker Process.

Despite the advantages of designing for one-piece-flow, the formation of a cell must be carefully considered before implementation. Use of costly and complex equipment that tends to break down can cause massive delays in the production and will ruin output until they can be brought back online.

"A cell is a small organizational unit...designed to exploit similarities in how you process information, make products, and serve customers. Manufacturing cells [closely locate] people and equipment required for processing families of like products. [Prior to cellularization, parts] may have traveled miles to visit all the equipment and labor needed for their fabrication... After reorganization, families of similar parts are produced together within the physical confines of cells that house most or all of the required resources,...facilitating the rapid flow and efficient processing of material and information... Furthermore, cell operators can be cross-trained in several machines, engage in job rotation, and assume responsibilities for tasks [that] previously belonged to supervisors and support staff [including] activities such as planning and scheduling, quality control, trouble-shooting, parts ordering, interfacing with customers and suppliers, and record-keeping."

The short travel distances within cells serve to quicken the flows. Moreover, the compactness of a cell minimizes space that might allow build-ups of inventory between cell stations. To formalize that advantage, cells often have designed-in rules or physical devices that limit the amount of inventory between stations. Such a rule is known, in JIT/lean parlance, as kanban (from the Japanese), which establishes a maximum number of units allowable between a providing and a using work station. (Discussion and illustrations of cells in combinations with kanban are found in) The simplest form, kanban squares, are marked areas on floors or tables between work stations. The rule, applied to the producing station: "If all squares are full, stop. If not, fill them up."

An office cell applies the same ideas: clusters of broadly trained cell-team members that, in concert, quickly handle all of the processing for a family of services or customers.

A virtual cell is a variation in which all cell resources are not brought together in a physical space. In a virtual cell, as in the standard model, team members and their equipment are dedicated to a family of products or services. Although people and equipment are physically dispersed, as in a job shop, their narrow product focus aims for and achieves quick throughput, with all its advantages, just as if the equipment were moved into a cellular cluster. Lacking the visibility of physical cells, virtual cells may employ the discipline of kanban rules in order to tightly link the flows from process to process.

A simple but rather complete description of cell implementation comes from a 1985 booklet of 96 pages by Kone Corp. in Finland, producer of elevators, escalators, and the like. Excerpts follow:

"The first step involved creating cells in the assembly, electrical and chemical testing departments. In April 1984 six cells, identified by different colors, were established... All devices manufactured in cells are identified by the cell's color, and all feed-back from quality control is directed straight to the workers of the cell concerned... The second step, in summer, 1984, was to "cellularize" manufacture of the analyzer subassemblies [that are] needed in the analyzer cells, and to test them if necessary. Production of the five sub-assembly cells consists exclusively of certain analyzer sub-units. The parts and materials are located in the cells... Material control between the cells is based on the pull system and actual demand. In the analyzer cells there is a buffer consisting of two pieces for each (roughly 25 different) sub-unit. When one piece is taken into assembly, a new one is ordered from the corresponding unit-cell. The order is made [using] a magnetic [kanban] button, which identifies the ordering cell (by color), unit (by code), and order date... When the manufacturing cell has completed the order, the unit is taken with the [kanban] button to its place on the ordering cell shelf. Orders from the unit cells to the sub-cells are based on the same principle. The only difference is that the buffer size is six sub-units. This [procedure] was implemented in August, 1984."

== Implementation process ==
In order to implement cellular manufacturing, a number of steps must be performed. First, the parts to be made must be grouped by similarity (in design or manufacturing requirements) into families. Then a systematic analysis of each family must be performed; typically in the form of production flow analysis (PFA) for manufacturing families, or in the examination of design/product data for design families. This analysis can be time-consuming and costly, but is important because a cell needs to be created for each family of parts. Clustering of machines and parts is one of the most popular production flow analysis methods. The algorithms for machine part grouping include Rank Order Clustering, Modified Rank Order Clustering, and Similarity coefficients.

There are also a number of mathematical models and algorithms to aid in planning a cellular manufacturing center, which take into account a variety of important variables such as, "multiple plant locations, multi-market allocations with production planning and various part mix." Once these variables are determined with a given level of uncertainty, optimizations can be performed to minimize factors such as, "total cost of holding, inter-cell material handling, external transportation, fixed cost for producing each part in each plant, machine and labor salaries".

== Difficulties in creating flow ==
The key to creating flow is continuous improvement to production processes. Upon implementation of cellular manufacturing, management commonly "encounters strong resistance from production workers". It will be beneficial to allow the change to cellular manufacturing to happen gradually.

It is also difficult to fight the desire to have some inventory on hand. It is tempting, since it would be easier to recover from an employee suddenly having to take sick leave. Unfortunately, in cellular manufacturing, it is important to remember the main tenets: "You sink or swim together as a unit" and that "Inventory hides problems and inefficiencies." If the problems are not identified and subsequently resolved, the process will not improve.

Another common set of problems stems from the need to transfer materials between operations. These problems include "exceptional elements, number of voids, machine distances, bottleneck machines and parts, machine location and relocation, part routing, cell load variation, inter and intracellular material transferring, cell reconfiguring, dynamic part demands, and operation and completion times". These difficulties need to be considered and addressed to create efficient flow in cellular manufacturing.

== Benefits and costs ==
Cellular manufacturing brings scattered processes together to form short, focused paths in concentrated physical space. So constructed, by logic a cell reduces flow time, flow distance, floor space, inventory, handling, scheduling transactions, and scrap and rework (the latter because of quick discovery of nonconformities). Moreover, cells lead to simplified, higher validity costing, since the costs of producing items are contained within the cell rather than scattered in distance and the passage of reporting time.

Cellular manufacturing facilitates both production and quality control. Cells that are underperforming in either volume or quality can be easily isolated and targeted for improvement. The segmentation of the production process allows problems to be easily located and it is more clear which parts are affected by the problem.

There are also a number of benefits for employees working in cellular manufacturing. The small cell structure improves group cohesiveness and scales the manufacturing process down to a more manageable level for the workers. Workers can more easily see problems or possible improvements within their own cells and tend to be more self-motivated to propose changes. Additionally, these improvements that are instigated by the workers themselves cause less and less need for management, so over time overhead costs can be reduced. Furthermore, the workers often are able to rotate between tasks within their cell, which offers variety in their work. This can further increase efficiency because work monotony has been linked to absenteeism and reduced production quality.

Case studies in just-in-time and lean manufacturing are replete with impressive quantitative measures along those lines. For example, BAE Systems, Platform Solutions (Fort Wayne, Ind.), producing aircraft engine monitors and controls, implemented cells for 80 percent of production, reducing customer lead time 90 percent, work-in-process inventory 70 percent, space for one product family from 6,000 square feet to 1,200 square feet, while increasing product reliability 300 percent, multi-skilling the union-shop work force, and being designated an Industry Week Best Plant for the year 2000. By five years later, rework and scrap had been cut 50 percent, new product introduction cycles 60 percent, and transactions 90 percent, while also increasing inventory turns three-fold and service turn times 30 percent, and being awarded a Shingo Prize for the year 2005.

It appears to be difficult to isolate how much of those benefits accrue from cellular organization itself; among many case studies researched for this article few include attempts at isolating the benefits. One exception is the contention, at Steward, Inc. (Chattanooga, Tenn.), producing nickel zinc ferrite parts for electromagnetic interference suppression. According to case study authors, cells resulted in reductions of cycle time from 14 to 2 days, work-in-process inventories by 80 percent, finished goods inventories by 60 percent, lateness by 96 percent, and space by 56 percent.

Another cellular case study includes quantitative estimates of the extent to which cells contributed to overall benefits. At Hughes Ground Systems Group (Fullerton, Calif.), producing circuit cards for defense equipment, the first cell, which began as a pilot project with 15 volunteers, was launched in 1987. One month later a second cell began, and by 1992 all production employees, numbering about 150, had been integrated into seven cells. Prior to cells, circuit card cycle time, from kit release to shipment to the customer, had been 38 weeks. After the cells had taken over the full production sequence (mechanical assembly, wave solder, thermal cycle, and conformal coat), cycle time had fallen to 30.5 weeks, of which production manager John Reiss attributed 20 weeks to use of a "WIP chart system" by the cell teams and the other 10.5 weeks to the cellular organization itself. Later, when it seemed that the cells were overly large and cumbersome, cell sizes were shrunk by two-thirds, resulting in "micro cells" that cut cycle time by another 1.5 weeks. Finally, by adopting certain other improvements, cycle times had decreased to four weeks. Other improvements included reducing work-in-process inventory from 6 or 7 days to one day and percent defective from 0.04 to 0.01 Switching from a functional (job-shop) layout to cells often costs has a minus net cost, inasmuch as the cell reduces costs of transport, work-in-process and finished inventory, transactions, and rework. When large, heavy, expensive pieces of equipment (sometimes called "monuments" in lean terminology) must be moved, however, the initial costs can be high to the point where cells are not feasible.

There are a number of possible limitations to implementing cellular manufacturing. Some argue that cellular manufacturing can lead to a decrease in production flexibility. Cells are typically designed to maintain a specific flow volume of parts being produced. Should the demand or necessary quantity decrease, the cells may have to be realigned to match the new requirements, which is a costly operation, and one not typically required in other manufacturing setups.

== See also ==
- Cross-training (business)
- Lean manufacturing
- Production flow analysis
