= Metrophanes =

Metrophanes (Ancient Greek: Μητροφάνης) is a Greek masculine given name derived from μήτηρ 'mother' + φαίνω, 'appear, shine'.

The name may refer to:

- Saint Metrophanes of Byzantium, bishop of Byzantium from 306 to 314
- Metrophanes of Smyrna, Christian bishop, Metropolitan of Smyrna, in the ninth century
- Patriarch Metrophanes II of Constantinople, reigned from 1440 to 1443
- Patriarch Metrophanes III of Constantinople, reigned from 1565 to 1572 and from 1579 to 1580
- Patriarch Metrophanes of Alexandria (Metrophanes Kritopoulos), reigned between 1636 and 1639
- Metrophanes, Chi Sung (1855–1900), Chinese Orthodox priest and martyr

== See also ==
- Mitrofan, Slavic equivalent
