= Mitrofanov =

Mitrofanov (Russian: Митрофанов) is a masculine surname. The feminine form is Mitrofanova. Notable persons with that name include:

- Aleksey Mitrofanov (born 1962), Russian politician
- Leopold Mitrofanov (1932–1992), Russian chess composer
- Mikhail Mitrofanov (born c. 1977), Russian rugby league player
- Miroslav Mitrofanov (born 1966), Latvian politician
- Misha Mitrofanov (born 1997), American skater
- Oleksandr Mitrofanov (born 1977), Ukrainian footballer
- Pavel Mitrofanov (1857–1920), Russian embryologist and histologist
- Sergei Petrovich Mitrofanov (1915–2003), Russian industrial engineer
- Vasily Mitrofanov (1899–1970), Soviet general
- Eleonora Mitrofanova (born 1953), Russian politician and diplomat
- Elina Mitrofanova (born 1992), Russian ice hockey player
- Dmytro Mytrofanov (born 1989) Ukrainian professional boxer

== See also ==
- Mitrofan (disambiguation)
