= Chinese Martyrs =

Group of church members killed by China

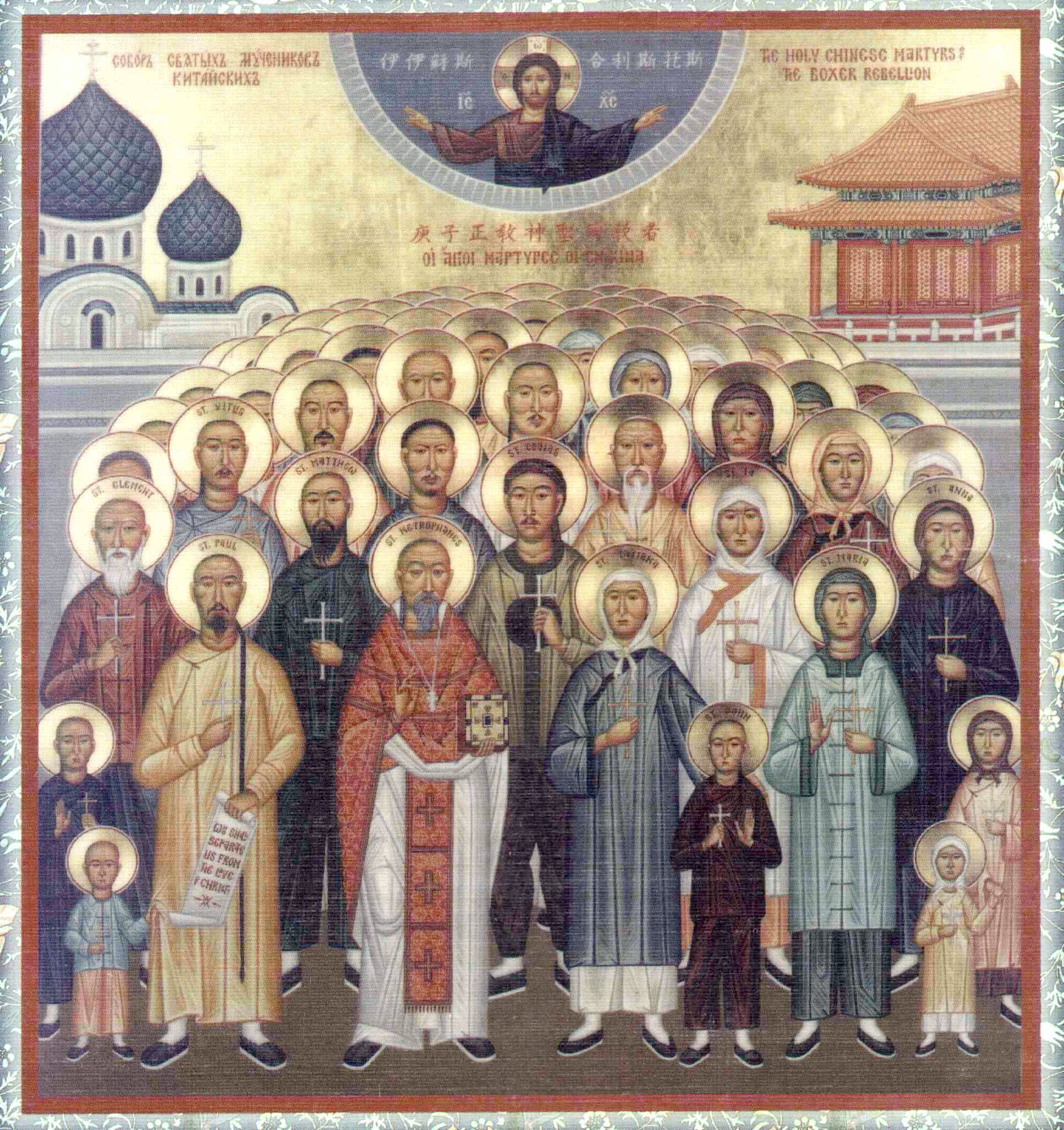
- Orthodox icon of the Chinese Martyrs
- Died: 1648–1930, Qing Dynasty and Republic of China
- Martyred by: Boxer Rebellion, etc.
- Venerated in: Catholic Church; Eastern Orthodox Church; Anglican Church
- Canonized: Catholic: 1 October 2000, St. Peter's Basilica, Rome, by Pope John Paul II; Orthodox: February 3, 2016, Moscow, Russia, by Russian Orthodox Church
- Feast: Orthodox: 11 June; Catholic (Roman Calendar), Anglican Communion: 9 July
- Notable martyrs: Metrophanes, Chi Sung, first Orthodox Christian martyr to be killed; Francis Ferdinand de Capillas, protomartyr of China; Augustine Zhao Rong, missionary of China

Chinese Martyrs (traditional Chinese: 中華殉道聖人; simplified Chinese: 中华殉道圣人; pinyin: Zhōnghuá xùndào shèngrén; Wade–Giles: Chung^{1}-hua^{2} hsun^{4}-tao^{4} shêng^{4}-jên^{2}) is the name given to a number of members of the Catholic Church and the Eastern Orthodox Church who were killed in China during the 19th and early 20th centuries. They are venerated as martyrs. Most were Chinese laypersons, but others were clergy from various other countries; many of them died during the Boxer Rebellion.

== Eastern Orthodox ==
The Eastern Orthodox Church recognizes 222 Orthodox Christians who died during the Boxer Rebellion as Holy Martyrs of China. On the evening of 11 June 1900 leaflets were posted in the streets, calling for the massacre of the Christians and threatening anyone who would dare to shelter them with death.

They were mostly members of the Chinese Orthodox Church, which had been under the guidance of the Russian Orthodox Church since the 17th century and maintained close relations with them, especially in the large Russian community in Harbin. They are called new-martyrs, as they died under a modern regime. The first of these martyrs was Metrophanes, Chi Sung, leader of the Peking Mission, who was killed, along with his family, during the Boxer Rebellion. All told, 222 members of the Peking mission died.

In April 22, 1902 the Russian Orthodox Church allowed the local veneration of the Chinese Martyrs. In 1997, ROCOR promoted the church-wide veneration of the martyrs and several icons were made, in 2016, the Holy Synod of the Russian Orthodox Church officially canonized the saints and allowed church-wide veneration.

== Catholic ==
The Catholic Church recognizes 120 Catholics who died between 1648 and 1930 as its Martyr Saints of China. They were canonized by Pope John Paul II on 1 October 2000. Of the group, 87 were Chinese laypeople and 33 were clergy; 86 died during the Boxer Rebellion in 1900. The Chinese Martyrs Catholic Church in Toronto, Ontario is named for them.

== Protestant ==
Many Protestants also died during the Boxer Rebellion, including the China Martyrs of 1900, but there is no formal veneration (according to their religious beliefs) nor a universally recognized list.

At least 189 missionaries and 500 native Chinese Protestant Christians were murdered in 1900 alone. Though some missionaries considered themselves non-denominationally Protestant, among those killed were Baptists, Evangelicals, Anglicans, Lutherans, Methodists, Presbyterians and Plymouth Brethren.

== See also ==
- Christianization
- Persecution of Christians
- Christianity in China
