= Jean Sophia Pigott =

Irish poet and hymn lyricist

- Born: 8 Sep 1845; Leixlip, Ireland
- Died: 12 October 1882; Leixlip, Ireland
- Occupation(s): Poet and hymnist
- Known for: Christian hymns and poems

Jean Sophia Pigott (1845–1882) was a Christian poet and hymn lyricist in Ireland.

== Biography ==
Born in Leixlip, Ireland, Jean Sophia Pigott was the sister to China missionary William Frederick Pigott, who joined the ministry of Hudson Taylor who headed the China Inland Mission. It is believed that William introduced Jean's hymns to the leader of the Mission. Her brother Thomas Wellesley Pigott also served as a CIM missionary and was executed with his family in the Taiyuan massacre.

According to Hendry, Taylor particularly enjoyed Jean Pigott's hymn, Jesus, I Am Resting, Resting, and he adopted it as his personal "life song." He was even said to have whistled that tune during the stressful time of the kidnapping and murder of Jean's brother William Pigott and 76 of his fellow missionaries, during the 1900 Boxer Rebellion in China.

Jean was a published poet from a young age and by the age of 35, she had authored a book of her verses called “A Royal Service.” The lyrics to her most famous poem and hymn, Jesus, I Am Resting, Resting, were first traced to that work.

Jean Sophia Pigott died at 37 on 12 October 1882 in Leixlip, County Kildare, where she is buried.

== Selected works ==
- Jesus, I Am Resting, Resting
- Jesus, I Am Resting, Resting (lyrics with music)
- Divine Childhood
- One Touch
- Take Thine Own Way, in Woman in Sacred Song
- A Royal Service, in Woman in Sacred Song

== See also ==
Jessie Pigott
