= List of Protestant missionary societies in China (1807–1953) =

This is a list of Protestant missionary societies in China (1807–1953).

== Protestant missionary societies in China 1807-1953 ==
Name	Date work begun in China
Allgemeiner Evangelical Protestant Missionsverein	1885
Alliance China Mission	
American Advent Christian Mission	1897
American Baptist Missionary Union	1834
American Bible Society	1876
American Board of Commissioners for Foreign Missions	1830
American Lutheran Brethren Mission	1902
Church of the Lutheran Brethren of America	1903
American Lutheran Mission	1890
American Methodist Episcopal Mission	1847
American Norwegian Lutheran Mission	1899
American Presbyterian Mission	1835
American Presbyterian Mission (South)	1903
American Presbyterian Reformed Mission	1897
American Protestant Episcopal Church Mission	1903
American Reformed Mission	1842
American Scandinavian Congregational Mission	1887
American Society of Friends' Mission	1890
American Southern Baptist Mission	1845
American Southern Methodist Episcopal Mission	1847
American Southern Presbyterian Mission	1867
Apostolic Faith Mission of Australasia	1927?
Augustana Synod Mission	1905
Baptist Missionary Society	1860
Basel Mission	1847
Basel Missionary Society	1903
Bible Christian Mission	1884
Berlin Foundling House	1850
Berlin Missionary Society	1851
British and Foreign Bible Society	1843
Canadian Methodist Mission	1891
Canadian Presbyterian Mission	1871
Cassel Missionary Society	1850
Central China Religious Tract Society	1876
China Baptist Publication Society	1903
China Inland Mission	1862
China Missionary Alliance	1901
China Tract Society	1903
Chinese Evangelization Society	1853
Chinese Home Missionary Society	
Chinese Tract Society	1878
Christian and Missionary Alliance	1890
Christian Catholic Church in Zion	1903
Christian College in China	1903
Christian Reformed Church	
Christian Vernacular Society of Shanghai	1890
Christians' Mission	1885
Church of England Mission	1903
Church of England Missionary Society	1837
Church of England Zenana Mission	1884
Church Missionary Society	1844
Church of Scotland Mission	1878
Church of Sweden Mission	1918
Church of the Brethren Mission	1908
Church of the Nazarene	1914
Congregational Church of Sweden	1890
Cumberland Presbyterian Mission	1898
Danish Lutheran Mission	1896
Danish Missionary Union	
Educational Association of China	1877
English Baptist Mission	1902
English Methodist Mission	1902
English United Methodist Free Church	1902
English Presbyterian Mission	1847
English Wesleyan Mission	1852
The Evangelical Alliance Mission	1900
The Evangelical Lutheran Mission	1913
Evangelical Missionary Alliance	
Finnish Missionary Society	1901
Finnish Free Missionary Society	
Free Church of Finland Mission	1889
French Protestant Missionary Society	1860
Friedenshort Deaconess Mission	1911
Friends Foreign Mission Association	1886
Foreign Christian Missionary Society	1886
General Baptist Missionary Society or English Baptist Mission	1845
General Evangelical Protestant Mission	1884
German Evangelical Church	1902
German China Alliance Mission	1889
German Women's Bible Union	1908
German Women's Missionary Union	1908
Gospel Mission	1892
Hauge's Synod Mission	1891
Hong Kong Hildesheim Mission for the Blind	1890
North Honan Mission	1888
Hunan Protestant Methodist Church Mission	
Irish Presbyterian Mission	1869
Independent (12 women and 6 men in 1903)	1903
International Committee of Young Men's Christian Associations' Secretaries	1903
Liebenzell Mission	1906
London Missionary Society	1807
Lutheran Free Church Mission	1917
Lutheran Brethren Mission	1903
Kiel China Mission	1897
Kiangshi-Hunan Tract Press	1903
Kiao-chau Swedish Baptist Mission	
Macao Christian College in China	
Medical Missionary Society of China	1838
Methodist New Connexion	1860
Methodist Episcopal Church South USA	1902
Methodist Episcopal Mission	1902
Missionary Home and Agency	1902
Methodist Union Publishing House	
Mission Union for the Evangelization of China in Pomerania	1858
National Bible Society of Scotland	1902
Netherlands Chinese Evangelization Society	1855
Netherlands Missionary Society	1826
North China Tract Society	1882
North-West Kiang-si Mission	
Norwegian Lutheran China Mission Association	1891
Norwegian Lutheran Mission	
Norwegian Mission in China	1889
Norwegian Missionary Society	1901
Reformed Church in the United States	1897
Reformed Church in America	1903
Rhenish Missionary Society	1847
Peking Mission for Chinese Blind	1881
Pentecostal Missionary Union of England	
Presbyterian Church of New Zealand	
Protestant Episcopal Church Mission	1835
Protestant Methodist Church Mission	1902
St. Chrischona Pilgrim Mission (became Theologisches Seminar St. Chrischona)	1895
The Scandinavian Alliance Mongolian Mission	
The Scandinavian American Christian Free Mission	1888
The Scandinavian China Alliance Mission	1891
Scandinavian Missionary Alliance	1902
Scottish Bible Society	1863
Scottish United Presbyterian Mission	1865
Seamen's Church and Mission Society	
Seamen's Mission	
Seventh-day Adventist Mission	1902
Seventh Day Baptist Mission	1847
The Sheo Yang Mission (Note: The Sheo Yang Mission was formed by a group breaking away from the CIM in T'ai-yüan, Shan-si; all but a few on furlough died in the Taiyuan Massacre, those remaining joined the BMS to continue the work from 1900)	1892
Society for the Diffusion of Christian and General Knowledge Among the Chinese	1886
Society for Promotion of Female Education in the East	1864
Society for Propagation of the Gospel	1862
Soul Winning and Prayer Union	
South Chih-li Mission	
Swedish Alliance Mission	1892
Swedish American Mission	1890
Swedish American Missionary Covenant	1902
Swedish Baptist Mission	1902
Swedish Holiness Union	1890
Swedish Mission in China	1890
Swedish Missionary Society	1849
Swedish Mongolian Mission	
The John G Kerr Refuge for Insane Weihaiwei	1903
United Brethren in Christ	1889
United Church of Canada Foreign Mission Society	1926
United Evangelical Church Mission	1900
United Free Church of Scotland	1863
United Methodist Free Church	1864
United Society for Christian Endeavor for China	
Woman's Union Missionary Society of America	1859
Wesleyan Missionary Society	1902
Yale University Mission	
YMCA	
Yunnan Mission	1890

== See also ==
- Historical Bibliography of the China Inland Mission
- List of Protestant missionaries in China
- Protestant missions in China
- List of Christian Missionaries
- Timeline of Christian missions
- Chefoo School
