= Yuxian =

Yuxian may refer to:

- Yuxian (Qing dynasty) (1842–1901), Manchu high official of the Qing dynasty
- Yu County, Hebei (蔚县), or Yuxian, county in Hebei, China
- Yu County, Shanxi (盂县), or Yuxian, county in Shanxi, China
- Yuzhou, Henan, formerly Yu County (禹县) or Yuxian, county-level city in Henan, China
