= General Evangelical Protestant Mission =

General Evangelical Protestant Mission later the East Asian Mission was a German Protestant Christian missionary society that was involved in sending workers to countries such as China during the late Qing Dynasty.

In 1884 it is recorded as having its first missionary in China. In 1885 H.W. Spinner became its first missionary to Japan.

From 1899 to 1919 Richard Wilhelm served with the mission.

== See also ==
- Protestant missionary societies in China during the 19th Century
- Timeline of Chinese history
- 19th-century Protestant missions in China
- List of Protestant missionaries in China
- Christianity in China
