= American Southern Presbyterian Mission =

Former mission society organized in 1862

American Southern Presbyterian Mission was an American Presbyterian missionary society of the Southern Presbyterian Church that was involved in sending workers to countries such as China during the late Qing Dynasty, Japan and Korea. It was organized in 1862.

== See also ==
- Presbyterian Church in the United States
- Protestant missionary societies in China during the 19th Century
- Timeline of Chinese history
- 19th-century Protestant missions in China
- List of Protestant missionaries in China
- Christianity in China
