= Ffaldybrenin =

Village in Carmarthenshire, Wales

Coordinates: 52.0825°N 3.9902°W

- Location within Carmarthenshire
- Community: Llanycrwys
- Principal area: Carmarthenshire
- Preserved county: Dyfed
- Country: Wales
- Sovereign state: United Kingdom
- Post town: Llanwrda
- Postcode district: SA19
- Police: Dyfed-Powys
- Fire: Mid and West Wales
- Ambulance: Welsh
- UK Parliament: Caerfyrddin
- Senedd Cymru – Welsh Parliament: Carmarthen East and Dinefwr

Ffaldybrenin is a village in Llanycrwys community formed around the parish church in Carmarthenshire, Wales. In the late 19th century Church and State separated but the same area is now represented as a local authority by the Ffaldybrenin Community Council and the church by the parochial church council.

It was the birthplace of Baptist missionary in China, Timothy Richard, (1845–1919).
