= Swedish Mongolian Mission =

Swedish Mongolian Mission (Svenska Mongolmissionen) was a Swedish Protestant Christian missionary society that was involved in sending workers to countries such as Mongolia and China during the late Qing dynasty.

A Mongolian mission was founded in 1897 by Fredrik Franson. The first two missionaries to travel to Mongolia were Georg and Eva Eneroth in 1897. In 1899, a committee was founded, and another five missionaries were sent to Mongolia. The missionaries were located in southern Mongolia and mainly worked with healthcare and education.

After World War II and the founding of Communist China, Mongolia was deemed unruly. The remaining missionaries relocated to Japan in the early 1950s, and the society changed its name to Svenska Mongol- och Japanmissionen in 1951.

In 1982, the society joined with Svenska Missionen i Kina & Japan to form the Evangeliska Östasienmissionen (EÖM; Evangelical East Asian Mission).

== See also ==
- Protestant missionary societies in China (1807–1953)
- Timeline of Chinese history
- Protestant missions in China 1807–1953
- List of Protestant missionaries in China
- Christianity in China
