= Jessie Pigott =

English missionary in India, China (1851–1900)

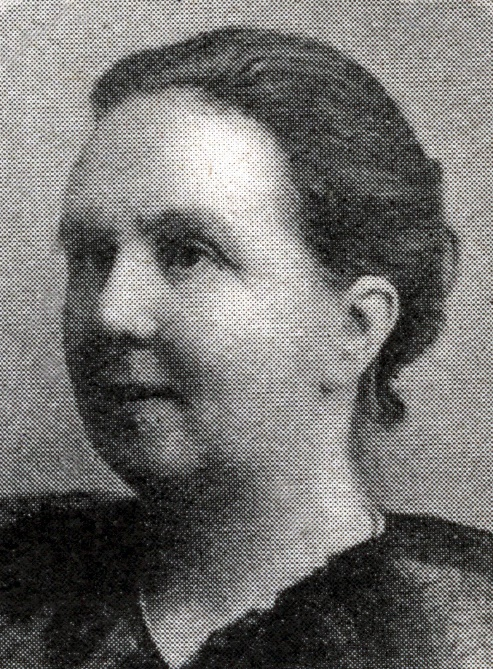
- Born: (Emily) Jessie Kemp; 8 August 1851; Tavistock Square, London, England
- Died: 9 July 1900 (aged 48); Taiyuan, China
- Employer(s): Baptist Missionary Society, China Inland Mission (CIM)
- Known for: missionary executed in China
- Spouse: Thomas Wellesley Pigott
- Children: William Wellesley Pigott

(Emily) Jessie Kemp, later Emily Pigott (8 August 1851 – 9 July 1900), was a British missionary to India and China. She was executed with her son and husband and over 40 others in the Taiyuan massacre.

== Life ==
Pigott was born in Tavistock Square in 1851 to a well off Baptist family based in Rochdale. Her mother was Emily Lydia Kemp, (born Kelsall) and her father George Tawke Kemp JP, was a magistrate and flannel manufacturer. Her father had married well and he had become a partner in Kelsall and Kemp.

Her whole family were interested in the work of missionaries so it was expected when she might volunteer to serve in India and her father escorted her to Egypt so she could serve with the Baptist Missionary Society in Allahabad and Delhi. She was returned on medical grounds and her doctors forbade her return.

She was able to continue as a missionary by volunteering to be sent to China by the China Inland Mission in Taiyuan. Her cousin, R. Harold A. Schofield, was already there, so in 1882 she and her sister, Florence made their way to the CIM medical mission in Shansi province. She was involved in medical and evangelical work there, where she performed operations on cataracts despite her lack of qualifications.

While she was in China she met Thomas Wellesley Pigott who was an CIM missionary from Kildare, Ireland and they were married in Peking on 16 July 1883. After a time, they left CIM and co-founded their own non-denominational mission, The Sheo Yang Mission. Her husband was assaulted and they were given furlough May 1885 to March 1888 in Britain. During this time back in the UK she took the opportunity to learn more about eye operations and she gave birth to their only child, William Wellesley Pigott, on 4 August 1887.

== Death and legacy ==
Pigott died in Taiyuan. The situation in China was becoming dangerous for foreigners and Pigott and her household finally left after the local authorities refused to guarantee their protection. They left home but found it so dangerous that they decided to return. They were captured and she, her husband, and her son were beheaded. Forty-four missionaries died in the Taiyuan Massacre.

A book was published titled "Steadfast Unto Death" about her life and that of her husband.

== See also ==
Jean Sophia Pigott
