= French Protestant Missionary Society =

The French Protestant Missionary Society at Paris was an early French Protestant Christian missionary society that was involved in sending workers to China during the late Qing dynasty.

== See also ==
- Protestant missionary societies in China during the 19th Century
