= The Sheo Yang Mission =

Protestant Christian missionary society in China

The Sheo Yang Mission (referred to as SYM in some accounts) was a Protestant Christian missionary society that was involved in sending workers to China during the late Qing dynasty. It was founded by the Pigott family in 1892 (possibly accompanied by two other families Johnson and McNair), they had previously been members of the China Inland Mission (CIM). The mission was destroyed and most members murdered in 1900, the work continued through the Baptist Missionary Society.

== Spelling of names, placenames ==
Shanxi

Shansi (Wade-Giles form) appears to be the preferred spelling in the years around the turn of the 19th Century, since then the pinyin form Shanxi has become the standard. Other forms seen include: Shan-si, Shan-hsi. Not to be confused with Shaanxi (Shensi, Shen-si) which is a different, but local, province.

Taiyuan

T'aiyuan, Taiyuen, T'ai-yuan (e.g. in Timothy Richards "Forty-five years in China"), T’ai-yüen. This is often seen with -fu or simply fu as an extension, presumably indicating that Taiyuan is the provincial capital. OCR errors include "T ai yiien".

Sheo Yang

Sheoyang, Shao Yang, Shou Yang or Sheo Iang.

Pigott

Also written as Piggott.

Lovitt

Also written Lovett.

== Relationship with the CIM and other missionary societies ==
Timothy Richard had arrived in Taiyuan in 1877 and worked there for several years after and hence alongside Pigott and the Sheo Yang missionaries. Little is recorded of the differences between Pigott et al. and the CIM., chapter 6 entitled "The Bible in J. Hudson Taylor's Missionary Teaching and Preaching" reports at section 6.2.3:

However, in the places where he worked alongside the CIM, some were influence by his views for he was a strong and attractive character. One of the first signs of a missionary being influenced by this teaching was to give up Bible distribution and evangelism. In 1881, the CIM separated itself from common worship with the BMS on account of Richard and his views. Taylor considered him ‘unorthodox’. Richard approached Taylor to discuss a comity arrangement but the idea was rejected. He found Taylor’s attitude obstructive but refrained from further fanning the flames and also passed over a school into CIM hands. Although most within Richard’s own mission, the BMS, had repudiated his views, some CIM members were influenced towards Richard’s position and Taylor had to go and deal with them. Taylor rejected Richard's approach, preferring to emphasise the preaching of Christ crucified. He believed that the imbibing of what was known as the ‘Shansi spirit’ would cause a loss of conviction and purpose.

Given that the Sheo Yang missioners moved from the CIM to the Baptist Missionary Society (BMS) it seems most likely that this Shansi spirit was the source of the disagreement.

On 1 August 1883, Dr Schofield died of Typhus Fever leaving Dr E H Edwards who had arrived the previous year, via the West of China with CIM, in charge of the Hospital. Dr E H Edwards later became part of the Sheo Yang mission but was on furlough when the Boxer Rebellion caused the death of all the other Sheo Yang missionaries.

In June and July 1886 missionaries of the various societies gathered for a conference with the visiting Hudson Taylor (CIM). Mr Sowerby (BMS) and Dr E H Edwards (CIM at the time) both questioned the level of knowledge of the local Tao-li that should be acquired. Hudson Taylors response included a recollection, thus:

I have heard one of the most capable Chinese gentlemen I have known in China preaching frequently, both to scholars and to poor men, and I noticed he scarcely ever made any reference to those things which he was master of. One might have expected him to deal with scholars on their own ground; I noticed he dealt with them only on the ground of salvation—“All you know, and all you have, and all you are, will not save you; but the Lord Jesus will.” The Lord wonderfully used him. It was never the Tao-li (Religion) he preached, but the Lord Jesus as his living Saviour.

The Pigott's travelled out to China in January 1888 with a group of missionaries setting out on the first Kaisar-i-Hind (Caesar of India) steam ship and later the SS Deccan. Mary Geraldine Guinness (who later became Geraldine Taylor, daughter-in-law to Hudson Taylor the head of the CIM) was amongst their number and mentions the Pigott's in her letters home.

Around the first week of April 1900 Rev Alexander Grant (father of Mrs Lovitt) and Mr Hoddle an "independent worker" visited the Sheo Yang mission, in "A Thousand Miles of Miracles" Rev A E Glover records:

THE first week in the April of the year 1900 we had the joy of welcoming to our station the veteran missionary, Mr. Alexander Grant (of Singapore and Amoy), who was returning to the coast from the provincial capital, T'ai-yüen Fu, where he had been visiting his married daughter and her husband, Dr. and Mrs. Lovitt, of the Sheo Iang Mission. He was accompanied by Mr. Hoddle, an independent worker in the city of T'ai-yüen. Though they had come from the capital, they had no evil tidings to bring us. Everything was, to all outward appearance, just as usual. How little we dreamed as we met together in happy fellowship what three months hence would have to reveal! Mr. Grant a refugee, barely escaping with his life and only with the loss of all his effects. Mr. Hoddle (together with Dr. and Mrs. Lovitt and some forty other foreign workers) beheaded and in a martyr's grave. Our own station rioted, and ourselves stripped of all and in the hands of the Boxers.

== Members of the Sheo Yang Mission and reports mentioning them ==
The following people are variously listed as having been part of the Sheo Yang Mission (pages refer to entries in the "Chinese Recorder Index", † indicate martyrdom at Sheo Yang Mission as reported e.g. in "Last Letters" or "John Innocent".):

- † Miss Duval (p. 130)
- Rev Dr. E H Edwards M.D. father of George Kemp Edwards (p. 135)
- † Dr Arnold E Lovitt M.E.C.S (p. 295)
- † Mrs Lovitt, daughter of Rev. A Grant (who may also have died in the Taiyuan Massacre but is elsewhere reported to have survived).
- † Lovitt child
- † Rev Thomas Wellesley Pigott, father of Wellesley Pigott (p. 383)
- † Mrs Jessie Pigott nee Kemp
- † Wellesley Pigott
- † Mr John Robinson (p. 411)
- Miss Mary E Shekleton (p. 431) (note Google Books transcribes this as "Mery" in error)
- † Rev J Simpson (p. 436)
- † Mrs Simpson
- Miss Stewart (p. 454) (note Google Books transcribes this as "Stewert" in error)
- † Rev G W Stokes (p. 456)
- † Mrs Stokes
- † Miss Coombs (possibly "Combs")

A slightly less complete summary is given on p. 876. Pages 1045-46 report SYM under the headings "Shansi" or "Shansi, T'aiyuan" noting that SYM was in the capital Taiyuan of the Shanxi province of Northern China.

The Boxer Rebellion included the death of 77 Christian missionaries (or their family members) in the Taiyuan Massacre. Some are listed elsewhere on wikipedia. It is believed that all members of the Sheo Yang Mission died in the uprising.

== A letter by T W Pigott ==
An account of the martyrdoms in Shansi which includes reports on the reoccupation of the missionary stations includes this section (p. 15) with a letter written in May 1896 by Rev T W Pigott B.A., one of the martyrs:

The members of the Sheo-yang Mission, with the exception of Dr. and Mrs. Edwards, who were at home on furlough, were killed to a man, and so with the B.M.S. in Shan-si. Of the latter Mission two former members who had retired from the field have felt the present need to be a special call, and have already returned to Shan-si. In the C.I.M. the stations are being reoccupied so far as it is possible to draft workers from other districts, but many more workers are needed. The following letter, written in May 1896 by Mr. T. W. Pigott, B.A., one of the martyred missionaries, should lead us all to a careful consideration of our duty in the light of Eternity :

"I look back on 1879 when I first reached China, and am filled with thanksgiving and joy at the change God has wrought, and the more than hundred-fold He has given for the labour and treasure expended in this province (Shan-si). When I first reached this province there was not one baptized Christian here, and only two recently opened stations. Now there are many hundreds of converts, many of them earnest, faithful men, and a large number of stations where thousands are brought under Christian influence. How shall we look on the investment of our lives and labour here, even from the near standpoint of one hundred years hence ? I am, I can truly say, more grateful every day for the opportunity of serving Christ, and I believe this to be the only true and sober view of life s realities. The work pressed home

now, will make all the difference a few years hence. /page 16/ With Armenia before us we dare not count too much on future years. How suddenly the work was arrested there and the door shut against much hoped-for labour.

== Dr Lovitt's last letter ==
Dr Lovitt was martyred in the Taiyuan Massacre, the "Last Letters" includes this letter:

T AI-YUAX-FU, June 28, 1900.

DEAR FRIEND We do not know whom you may be, but we thought it well to leave this letter in the hands of a trusty native to give to the first foreigner who might come along...

We would like our dear home ones to know we are being marvellously sustained by the Lord. He is precious to each of us. The children seem to have no fear. We cannot but hope for deliverance (hope dies hard), and our God is well able to do all things even to save us from the most impossible surroundings when hope is gone. Our trust is in Him entirely and alone. We at the same time are seeking to do all that is in our power, and asking guidance at every step...

There is not much time. We are ready.

ARNOLD E. LOVITT, M.E.C.S.

== Aftermath ==
The Encyclopaedia Sinica, p. 512., reports:

In 1900 eleven of these [the Pigott's and thirteen other workers] were killed by the Boxers, together with two children, one being the only son of Mr. and Mrs. Pigott. Of the 21 [local] church members, 10 were also killed. The surviving workers jointed[sic] the Baptist Missionary Society after the Boxer Uprising.

== See also ==
- Protestant missionary societies in China during the 19th Century
- Timeline of Chinese history
- 19th-century Protestant missions in China
- List of Protestant missionaries in China
- Christianity in China
