= Mitrokhin =

Mitrohin, Mitrokhin (Russian: Митрохин; feminine Mitrohina, Mitrokhina) is a Russian patronymic surname derived from the first name "Mitrokha", a diminutive form of "Mitrofan". The surname may refer to:

- Dmitry Mitrokhin (1883–1973), Russian artist
- Galina Mitrokhina (rower) (born 1940), Russian rower
- Galina Mitrokhina (track athlete) (born 1944), Russian track and field athlete
- Vasili Mitrokhin (1922–2004), major and senior archivist for the Soviet Union's foreign intelligence service, author of the Mitrokhin Archive
  - Mitrokhin Commission
- Sergey Mitrokhin (born 1963), Russian politician and statesman
- Yuri Mitrokhin, Russian football player.
