= Berlin Foundling House =

Organization

Berlin Foundling House was a German Protestant Christian missionary society that was involved in sending workers to China during the late Qing Dynasty.

== Work in China ==
The Berlin Foundling Society established a charitable mission in Hong Kong, where Rev. F. Hartman, assisted by four women agents, were at work. This institution was established in 1850. Dr. Karl Gützlaff visited Berlin in that year, and gave such a graphic account of the distressing misery existing in China, that the wife of a Lutheran pastor, named Gustav Friedrich Ludwig Knak, resolved to seek to alleviate it. Rev. Knak was Pastor of the Bethlehem Church in Berlin. Dr. Gutzlaff had spoken of the great number of infants cast away by their parents in China, and Mrs. (Mathilde Wendt) Knak formed a ladies association to organise a plan to rescue some of these foundlings. A house was rented in Hong Kong, and the work began. Not many children were found in Hong Kong, but many were brought in baskets from the country districts of China. Some were in such a reduced condition when they were received that they soon died, but soon a large number were received and placed under instruction. In 1861 new and enlarged premises were built, the funds being supplied by foreign residents in Hong Kong and by benevolent donors in Germany. In the course of twenty years three hundred children were received, but of these a considerable number died. They received Christian teaching, and learned to read and write. They were taught arithmetic, geography, history, and singing. They learned also to perform household duties.

== See also ==
- Protestant missionary societies in China during the 19th Century
- Timeline of Chinese history
- 19th-century Protestant missions in China
- List of Protestant missionaries in China
- Christianity in China
