= Production flow analysis =

Concept in operations management & industrial engineering

In operations management and industrial engineering, production flow analysis refers to methods which share the following characteristics:

1. Classification of machines
2. Technological cycles information control
3. Generating a binary product-machines matrix (1 if a given product requires processing in a given machine, 0 otherwise)

Methods differ on how they group together machines with products. These play an important role in designing manufacturing cells.

== Rank order clustering ==
Given a binary product-machines n-by-m matrix $b_{ip}$, rank order clustering is an algorithm characterized by the following steps:

1. For each row i compute the number $\sum_{p=1}^{m}b_{ip}*2^{m-p}$
2. Order rows according to descending numbers previously computed
3. For each column p compute the number $\sum_{i=1}^{n}b_{ip}*2^{n-i}$
4. Order columns according to descending numbers previously computed
5. If on steps 2 and 4 no reordering happened go to step 6, otherwise go to step 1
6. Stop

== Similarity coefficients ==
Given a binary product-machines n-by-m matrix, the algorithm proceeds by the following steps:

1. Compute the similarity coefficient $s_{ij}=n_{ij}/(n_{ij}+u)$ for all with $n_{ij}$ being the number of products that need to be processed on both machine i and machine j, u comprises the number of components which visit machine j but not k and vice versa.
2. Group together in cell k the tuple (i*,j*) with higher similarity coefficient, with k being the algorithm iteration index
3. Remove row i* and column j* from the original binary matrix and substitute for the row and column of the cell k, $s_{rk}=max(s_{ri*},s_{rj*})$
4. Go to step 2, iteration index k raised by one

Unless this procedure is stopped the algorithm eventually will put all machines in one single group.
