= Wallacepur =

Village in Gujarat, India

Coordinates: 21.5694°N 72.1886°E

Wallacepur is a village in the Ghogha Taluka of Bhavnagar district, Gujarat, India. It was founded in the 19th century and became the only all-Christian village in Gujarat.

== History ==
The Ghogha Christian mission was initiated by the Reverend James McKee in 1844 and was a part of the Kathiawar and Gujarat mission establishment started and supported by the Irish Presbyterian Mission.

About 1869, Wallacepur was founded on a tract of land near the village of Kareda about 11 mi (18 km) southwest of Ghogha by William Beatty, a missionary at Ghogha from 1867 to 1877. The village was laid out and most of the houses were built by Beatty. He also built a church with a bell in 1871. The village was named after James Wallace, who had been appointed a missionary at Ghogha in 1845 and later at Surat. Wallace had retranslated scriptures, and written an educational textbook and some Gujarati tracts.

Additions to the village were made by the Reverend George T. Rea, who was in charge of the mission afterwards. In 1871, a number of Christians came from Gujarat and settled. At the time, there were eight houses, a church with a bell, a resthouse, a missionaries house, a public well, and a cattle pond.

Most of the villagers were Hindu and later adopted Christianity.

== Demographics ==
The village has a population of around 500 people, all of whom are literate. It is the only all-Christian village in Gujarat and all the residents are Protestants. Most men are engaged in farming, while many women have taken up roles as nurses, teachers, and clerks in nearby villages and Bhavnagar.

Disputes are settled internally and the village has been crime-free for years. Wallacepur has also been the recipient of the district council's cleanest village awards. The village has a reciprocal arrangement with the nearby village of Kareda, with residents of both attending each other's religious festivals.
