= Soul Winning and Prayer Union =

Soul Winning and Prayer Union was a Protestant Christian missionary society, founded in 1880, that was involved in sending workers to countries such as China, Syria, and the New Hebrides during the late Qing Dynasty.

== See also ==
- Protestant missionary societies in China during the 19th Century
- Timeline of Chinese history
- 19th-century Protestant missions in China
- List of Protestant missionaries in China
- Christianity in China
