= Big Swords Society =

Group of Chinese peasants

The Big Swords Society (Chinese: 大刀會; pinyin: Dàdāo Huì) or Great Knife Society was a traditional peasant group most noted for the killing of two German Catholic missionaries during the Juye Incident on November 1, 1897 at Zhang Jia Village where the missionaries were ambushed in their sleep by about 30 armed men. The Big Swords Society was widespread in North China during the Qing Dynasty and noted for its reckless courage. Rather than one large overarching organization, the Big Swords were local groups of small-holders and tenant farmers organized to defend villages against roaming bandits, warlords, tax collectors or later the Communists and Japanese.

== Early history ==
The Society was founded in the early 1890s by Liu Shiduan, a martial artist who lived in Caozhou prefecture in southwestern Shandong. The Grand Masters of these societies claimed to make the members invulnerable to bullets by magic. Both the Big Swords and Red Spears societies took part in the Boxer Rebellion in North China in 1900. During the first three decades of the 20th century, many peasants emigrated to the Northeast from Shandong and Hebei provinces where the Boxers had been most influential. The peasants revived the Big Swords Society as a measure of self-defence against the depredations of bandits and warlords. Because of a large immigration to Northeast China to escape the chaos in North China, they were also active in Manchuria.

In 1927, the Fengtian government's harsh taxes and ill-treatment of local people in the Linjiang area, close to the Korean border, led to the Big Swords Society being organised there on a large scale, triggered by the collapse of the prevailing Feng-Piao paper currency. In January 1928, the Society rebelled against the Fengtian government, seizing the town of Tonghua for a short time. During the rebellion the Big Swords were respected by the peasants because they did not harm or plunder the common people, but resisted the officials of the warlord Zhang Zuolin.

== Japanese invasion ==
In the face of the Japanese invasion of Manchuria in 1931, this traditional form of popular self-defence was revived. These societies soon formed part of the Anti-Japanese Volunteer Armies resisting the Japanese establishment of Manchukuo in 1932 and their later pacification campaigns.

The large numbers of men from the Manchurian countryside inspired to take up the fight against a foreign invader under the traditional and quasi-religious Big Sword Society were of a unique character. Members of the brotherhood placed their faith in folk magic and a belief in Heavenly rewards for their righteous character. Big Sword soldiers were described as claiming they lead charmed lives and were immune from bullets due to a combination of deep breathing exercises, magical formulae, and the swallowing of charms.

== Absorption into the CCP and suppression ==
Some Society members were won over and absorbed by the Chinese Red Army during the Second Sino-Japanese War or by the People's Liberation Army in the later Chinese Civil War. In 1953, the Chinese Communist Party (CCP) government launched a suppression campaign against Hui-Dao-Men ("Societies-Ways-Brotherhoods"), eradicating them from mainland China. Some of their offshoots have reappeared, reintroduced by Chinese adherents who live overseas.

== Sources ==
- Coogan, Anthony (July 1993). "The volunteer armies of northeast China". History Today. Vol. 43. Archived from the original on 2011-06-04 – via Questia.
- Elizabeth J. Perry; Rebels and Revolutionaries in North China, 1845–1945; Stanford University, 1980
