= Irish Presbyterian Mission =

Organization

The Irish Presbyterian Mission was an Irish Presbyterian missionary society.

== Prominent Members ==
- Rev Thomas Byers (Moderator of the Presbyterian Church)
- Rev Dr William Pearce Young, BA, DD, Father of the General Assembly of the Presbyterian Church in Ireland, a committee member for 45 years, and at the time of his death at age 91 in 1974, he had been ordained longer than any living minister.
- Rev. Principal J.E. Davey, M.A., D.D. (Moderator of the Presbyterian Church)

== Activities ==
=== India ===
The Irish Presbyterian Mission was established in 1840 in Ulster to proselytise Christianity worldwide. It started to send missionaries to Kathiawar peninsula of Gujarat, India in 1840s. This came about after the Indian mission was transferred to the Irish Presbyterian Mission from the London Missionary Society (LMS).

The Irish Presbyterian Church commissioned Alexander Kerr and James Glasgow in 1840 for missionary work in Gujarat. They arrived in Bombay in 1841 and reached Kathiawar Peninsula. They set up mission offices in Porbandar and Ghogha by 1843. When London Missionary Society closed its mission in Surat in 1847, the IP mission took over the church. It restarted it work in Ahmedabad in 1863. The mission established the first Christian village in Gujarat, Khashivadi near Borsad, in 1847. It also established a Robert's Hospital in Borsad in 1859. It founded other Christian villages; Ranipur near Ahmedabad (1862), Wallacepur, Khadana near Borsad, Porda, Anand, Brookhill and Nadiad. It also established the first 'ony girls' school at Muglisara, Surat in 1876. The first theological training course was set up in 1864 in Ahmedabad. In 1892, Fleming Stevenson Divinity College opened under the guidance of G. P. Taylor. In 1948, the administration was taken over by Gujarat Church Council (Presbytery) and later by Gujarat Christian Society by 1969.

=== Germany ===
The Irish Presbyterian Mission was active in Germany during the early 20th century. During the First World War, they visited German military hospitals in Hamburg and distributed Bibles to the injured soldiers. They continued their work in Germany until 1938. When Nazi Party members attacked one of their meetings in 1929, they required police protection for future meetings. Following the establishment of Nazi Germany, this protection was withdrawn in 1933 and the mission was legally suppressed in Germany by the Nazis in 1938.

=== China ===
It was involved in sending workers to countries such as China during the late Qing Dynasty. In 1890, they united their missionary work in China with the Scottish United Presbyterian Mission. In 1912, they also took over the LMS' mission in Mongolia.

== See also ==
- Protestant missionary societies in China during the 19th Century
- Timeline of Chinese history
- 19th-century Protestant missions in China
- List of Protestant missionaries in China
- Christianity in China
