= R. Harold A. Schofield =

British missionary in China (1851–1883)

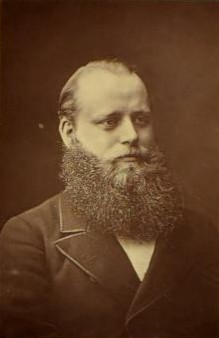
R. Harold A. Schofield

Robert Harold Ainsworth Schofield (1851–1883), known as Harold Schofield, was a British medical missionary in China. Before travelling there, he worked in Europe and the Middle East in hospitals and clinics. He died during his mission to China.

== Early life ==
He was born in 1851, in Gordon Square, London, England, the third son of Robert Schofield of Heybrook, Rochdale. The physician Alfred Taylor Schofield was his elder brother.

When Schofield was about seven years old, the family moved to Torquay for a short time; and then to Rochdale. He was educated at home, firstly. At age nine, he announced a religious conversion. From age 10, he was tutored by Arthur Pridham in East Budleigh, with his brother Alfred.

Schofield moved to a private school, near Manchester, at age 12, where he was a weekly boarder. He became head of the school, and took up rowing, riding and running.

At the age of 15, Schofield enrolled in Owens College in Manchester (now the Victoria University). He was elected associate of the college and obtained the Victoria Scholarship in Classics. In 1870 he obtained an exhibition and matriculated at Lincoln College, Oxford. After a first-class in Natural Sciences, he graduated B.A. (Oxon) in 1873, having early graduated B.A. and B.Sc. (London) at Owens College.

== Hospital doctor ==
After graduating from Lincoln College, Schofield worked under George Rolleston, as Demonstrator in the Museum of Comparative Anatomy. He gained a scholarship in science at St Bartholomew's Hospital (Barts), and left Oxford for London. There he won the Foster Scholarship in Anatomy as well as the Junior and Senior Scholarships in their respective years and the Brackenbury Medical Scholarship, and Lawrence Scholarship and gold metal. He became a Burdett-Coutts Scholar and then travelled on a Radcliffe Fellowship. In 1877 he graduated M.A. and M.B. (Oxon) 1877. There also he participated in the Students' Christian Association.

Schofield went as a volunteer to Serbia during the Serbian-Turkish Wars (1876-1878), for the National Aid Society. He was put in charge of the hospital at Belgrade. After a short period there, he returned to England, and then moved to Paris where he attended medical school. After getting his M.B. degree from Oxford, he returned to London and was selected by the National Aid Society to go to Turkey and help the wounded victims of the Russo-Turkish War. In August 1878 he returned to Barts and filled the posts of the house-surgeon and house-physician.

After six months, Schofield left for Germany and Austria on the Radcliffe Fellowship. He then passed through Turkey, Egypt and Palestine.

== Medical missionary ==
In 1880 Schofield decided to go to China with the China Inland Mission after a prayer meeting. Before he left, he married Elizabeth Jackson, and she accompanied him. The two of them travelled with Robert John Landale. He had first visited China in 1876, and joined the China Inland Mission in 1878.

On 7 April 1880 the party set off and made a two-week journey to the United States. There they stayed for a convention of Sunday school workers. In June they left for Japan, and on 15 June they began a tour of Japanese hospitals and churches. They went on to Shanghai, stayed there until 9 July, and departed for Zhifu.

The group spent three months in Zhifu, in tourism and social activity with other expatriates, religious meetings and study of the Chinese language. They left for Taiyuan in Shanxi province, Northern China, at the beginning of November, taking a steamer to Tianjin, and then making an overland journey. In Tianjin Schofield met John Kenneth MacKenzie, the medical missionary. In Taiyuan he set up a dispensary and new hospital, the first medical mission to have full Chinese backing.

In the first year in Taiyuan, Schofield was learning Chinese. He treated 50 inpatients and 1,500 outpatients, carrying out three operations under chloroform. By his second year he had 6,631 patients: much of his work was treating wolf bites. He performed 292 operations, with 47 under chloroform. In 1882 his cousins, Elizabeth and Jessie Kemp joined him at his suggestion.

Schofield also pioneered the treatment of opium addicts. He created an "opium asylum" and experimented with hypodermic morphine.

== Death ==
On 19 July 1883 Schofield wrote in his journal of feeling unwell, suspecting that it was malarial fever. By 23 July the symptoms appeared to be more similar to typhus. On the 31st Schofield had a temperature of 106°, and he died the following morning, 1 August. His last words were "tell Mr. Taylor and the Council...that these three years in China have been by far the happiest of my life." He had contracted typhus from body lice.

== Legacy ==
Schofield's clinic closed after his death, but a further missionary clinic was set up in Taigu County, Shanxi, in 1885. A hospital in Taiyuan was named after him, and medical successors were Millar Wilson, and Eben Henry Edwards.

The China Inland Mission publicised Schofield's work and death. In the following years, they had many applications from college graduates, including the Cambridge Seven group who went to China in 1885.

== Works ==
- Observations on Taste-Goblets in the Epiglottis of the Dog and Cat, J Anat. Physiol. 1876 Apr;10(Pt 3):474.2-477; work carried out at the Brown Animal Sanatory Institution under Emanuel Edward Klein.
- Foreign Medical Study, The Lancet Volume 110, Issue 2831, 1 December 1877, Pages 827–828
