= Chinese Evangelisation Society =

The Chinese Evangelisation Society (Chinese 中國傳教會) was an early British Protestant Christian missionary society that was involved in sending workers to China during the late Qing Dynasty. It was founded by Prussian Lutheran clergyman Karl Gützlaff. Hudson Taylor was the first missionary to be sent overseas in 1853. The society disbanded in 1865.

== See also ==
- OMF International (formerly China Inland Mission and Overseas Missionary Fellowship)
- Protestant missionary societies in China during the 19th Century
