= Metrophanes of Smyrna =

Metrophanes of Smyrna was a Christian bishop, Metropolitan of Smyrna, in the ninth century. He was a leader of the Ignatian (opposed to Photius) bishops at the time of the Photian schism (867).

== Life ==
In 857, when Ignatius was deposed, Metrophanes was already Metropolitan of Smyrna. He was strongly opposed to Photius. For a short time he wavered, as Photius promised not to attack Ignatius' rights, but, as soon as he found how little the intruder kept his word, he went back to his former attitude, from which nothing could make him waver again. Metrophanes was the leader of the bishops who excommunicated Photius in 858; they declared themselves excommunicate if ever they recognized him.

He was chained and imprisoned, then sent into exile by the Government. After 867, Metrophanes came back to his see. He was present at the Fourth Council of Constantinople in 869, opened the sixth session with a speech and was one of the judges who condemned Photius. When Ignatius died in 877 and Photius succeeded lawfully with the consent of Pope John VIII, Metrophanes still refused to recognise him, for which conduct he was again banished.

At the Photian Synod of 879 a certain Nicetas appears as Metropolitan of Smyrna; meanwhile Metrophanes lay sick at Constantinople. In 880 as he still refused to have anything to do with Photius he was excommunicated by the papal legates. After that he disappears. It is uncertain whether he returned to his see at Photius' second fall or whether he died in exile.

Baronius (Annales Ecclesiastici, ad an. 843, I) says that his mother was the woman who was bribed to bring a false accusation of rape against the Patriarch Methodius I (842-846) during the Iconoclast troubles. If this be true he was a native of Constantinople.

== Works ==
A letter of Metrophanes to Manuel, logothetes tou dromou, is extant, written in 870, in which he gives his reasons for his opposition to Photius. It is an important source for the struggle between Photius and Ignatius. Metrophanes also wrote an encomium of Saint Polycarp of Smyrna, several exegetical works (the Commentary on Ecclesiastes is preserved only in Georgian), an Anacreontic hymn on the Trinity, and other pieces.
