= Shanxi University =

Provincial public university in Taiyuan, Shanxi, China

- 山西大学
- Motto: 求真至善，登崇俊良。
- Motto in English: Seek the truth and kindness; respect and emulate the excellent
- Type: Public
- Established: 1902; 124 years ago
- President: Huang Guitian
- Academic staff: 2,224
- Students: 31,528
- Undergraduates: 24,096
- Location: Taiyuan, Shanxi, China; 37°48′N 112°35′E
- Campus: Urban
- Website: www.sxu.edu.cn/

Shanxi University (SXU; 山西大学) is a provincial public university in Taiyuan, Shanxi, China. It is affiliated with the Province of Shanxi. The university is part of the Double First-Class Construction.

== History ==
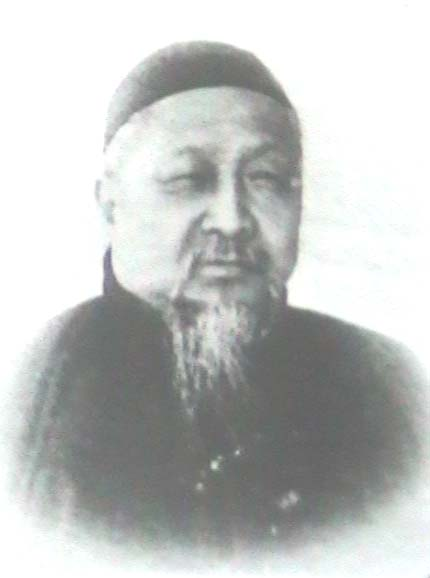
Cen Chunxuan

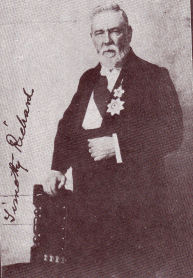
Timothy Richard

=== Early 1900 ===
The Shansi Imperial University (山西大学堂) was the predecessor of the Shanxi University, which was alternatively romanized as the Shansi University. The Shansi Imperial University was prepared in 1901 by Cen Chunxuan, then-governor of Shanxi, and on May 8, 1902, the Shansi Imperial University officially added the College of Western Studies, which was headed by the Welsh Baptist missionary Timothy Richard, focusing on teaching western technologies. 1902 was recognized as the official founding year of Shanxi University. Other than the Chinese government funding, one of the early funding sources of Shanxi University was the returned money from the British government with the Boxer Indemnity of Taiyuan massacre after Boxer Protocol, which was used to support the College of Western Studies.

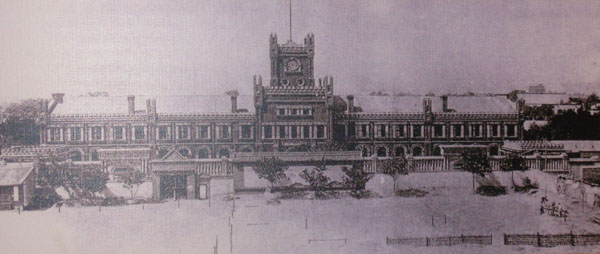
Shanxi University in 1904

Along with two other contemporary pioneer universities that started teaching western technologies in China: the Metropolitan Grand School (the predecessor of Peking University) and the Northern Grand School (the Predecessor of Tianjin University), the three universities together inaugurated a new era of modern Chinese higher education.

In 1912, following the Xinhai Revolution, Shansi Imperial University (山西大学堂) was renamed "Shanxi University". Its name was changed to "National Shanxi University" (simplified Chinese: 国立山西大学 traditional Chinese: 國立山西大學; pinyin: Guoli Shanxi Daxue) in 1918, and changed back to "Shanxi University" in 1931. In 1937, because of the Second Sino-Japanese War, which is part of World War II, Shanxi University was moved away from Taiyuan. The school of law was moved to Pingyao, the college of liberal arts was moved to Yuncheng, the department of engineering and physics and the office of president was moved to Linfen. Later, Japanese army occupied not only Taiyuan, but Pingyao, Yuncheng and Linfen as well. Shanxi University thus stopped teaching until 1938 it was rebuilt in Sanyuan, Shaan'xi (陕西) in 1938, and later it was moved again to Yichuan. In 1943, because of the typhus epidemic in Yichuan, Shanxi University was moved back to Shanxi (山西) province, at Jixian Nancun, which was the wartime temporary capital of Shanxi province, and the location was renamed as KeNanPo, literally meaning that "overcoming the suffering". Shanxi University finally moved back Taiyuan in 1946, after the Chinese victory over Japan of the second world war.

=== Late 20th century ===
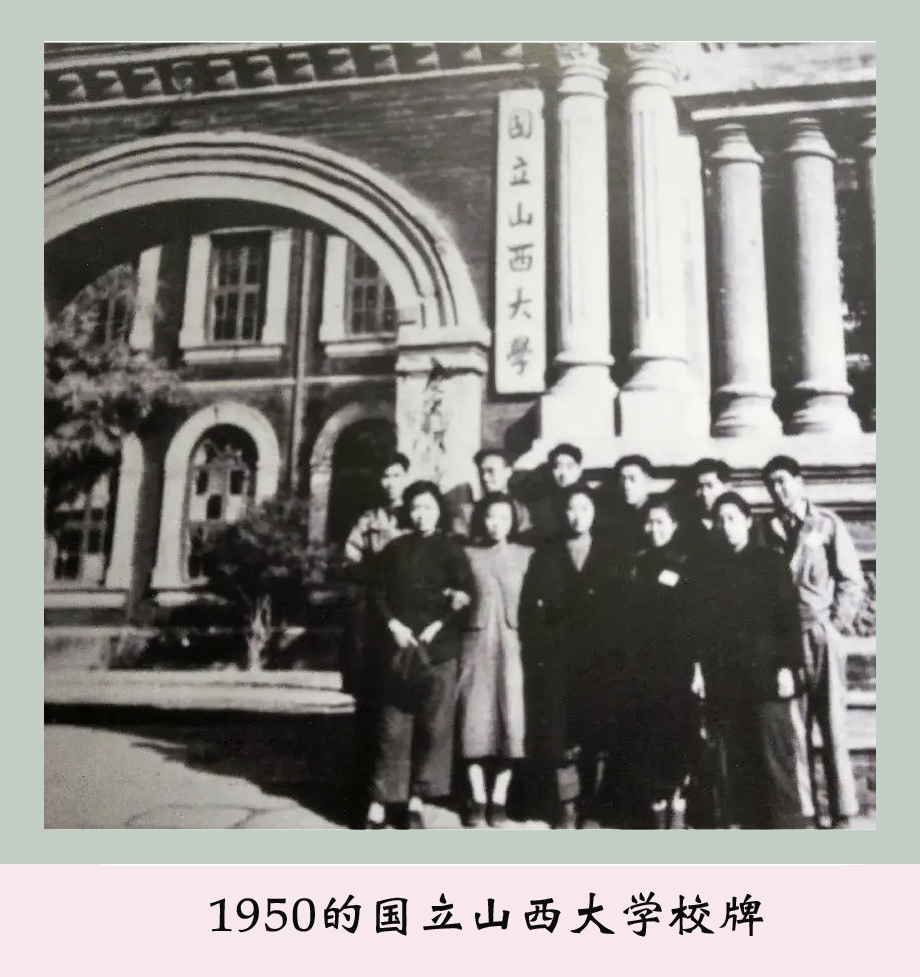
A group of students of National Shanxi University at the gate in 1950

In 1952, by order of the Ministry of Education of the People's Republic of China, the Department of Liberal Arts and the Department of Science were combined to form Shanxi Normal College, the School of Law was integrated into Renmin University of China in Beijing. The Department of Engineering was dismantled, and fragments absorbed into University of Science and Technology Beijing, Northwestern Polytechnical University and Taiyuan University of Technology. In 1959, Shanxi University was rebuilt on Taiyuan's Wucheng Street. By 1998, Shanxi University was considered a key university in Shanxi province.

=== Early 21st century - present ===
In May 2005, Shanxi University became a university co-developed by the state Ministry of Education and the People's government of Shanxi province.

== Notable alumni ==
- Wu Weihua
