= Mytrofan Yavdas =

Ukrainian priest

Mytrofan Yavdas— was a Ukrainian Autocephalous Orthodox protoiereus (archpriest) and religious author who suffered persecution and imprisonment while living in the Soviet Union.

== Education and ordainment ==
Mitrofan Yavdas was born in town of Yakimovo, Poltava Oblast on 3 June 1903. He studied at the Institute of National Education of Poltava. He was ordained as a clergyman of the Ukrainian Autocephalous Orthodox Church in 1925 and served as parish priest in Kuzemino, Poltava Oblast, during the years 1925—1927, and then in the town Zinkiv during the years 1927—1929.

== Soviet imprisonment ==
On 8 September 1929, he was arrested by the OGPU as part of a Soviet anti-religious campaign and confined in the Poltava prison. In 1930 he was sentenced to 7 years imprisonment and hard labor by an OGPU "troika" (tribunal). He served his sentence in the mines of the Far Eastern concentration camps of the OGPU. By the end of 1937, he returned from exile to Ukraine.

During the Second World War, he lived in the town of Nikopol, Dnipropetrovsk Oblast. During the years 1941—1942, he assisted Protoiereus Simon Yavtushenko to organize the church activities of the Ukrainian Autocephalous Orthodox Church in Nikopol Raion.

== Emigration ==
After emigrating to West Germany after the war, he was deprived of his clerical title and banned from the church by the synodic bishops in 1947, because he defended the ideas of the Ukrainian Autocephalous Orthodox Church at the congress of 1921 and because he participated in the 1947 Congress of the Church in Aschaffenburg, West Germany. During the years 1952–1953 he organized religious courses and was editor of the "Ukrainian Autocephalous Orthodox Bulletin".

He moved to the United States in 1957, where he settled in Waterbury, Connecticut. In 1989, he was politically "rehabilitated" by the Soviet government.

== Publishing work ==
Potoiereus Mitrofan Yavdas was the author of a number of religious books including: Ukrainian Autocephalous Orthodox Church (1956), How the Bolsheviks Tortured the Clergy, Protodeaconn Potiyenko Basil, The Brothers V. & M. Chehivsky, UAOC Priest Fr. Mikhailo Naumenko.
