= Mitrofan Grodzitsky =

Mitrofan Grodzitsky Russian: Митрофан Гродзицкий
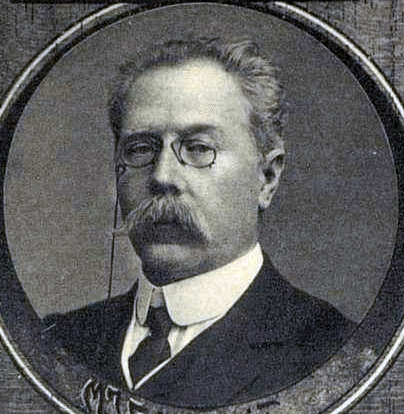
- photo of 1913

Deputy of the Third Imperial Duma
- In office 1 November 1907 – 9 June 1912
- Monarch: Nicholas II

Personal details
- Born: Mitrofan Iosifovich Grodzitsky; 1 October 1861 Minsk Governorate, Russian Empire
- Died: after 1917
- Party: Progressive Party

Mitrofan Iosifovich Grodzitsky (Russian: Митрофан Иосифович Гродзицкий; 1 October 1861, Minsk Governorate — after 1917) was a lawyer, a judge, a deputy of the Third and Forth Imperial Duma from Orenburg Governorate between 1907 and 1917. He was Commissioner for State Control, as well as Commissioner for the Chief Administration of Posts and Telegraphs of the Provisional Committee of the State Duma in 1917. He was participating in the preparation of the draft of Regulations on elections to the Russian Constituent Assembly. He was also a Central Committee member of the Russian Radical-Democratic Party (Russian: Российской радикально-демократической партии, РРДП).

== Literature ==
- Николаев А. Б. Гродзицкий Митрофан Иосифович (in Russian) // Государственная дума Российской империи: 1906—1917 / Б. Ю. Иванов, А. А. Комзолова, И. С. Ряховская. — Москва: РОССПЭН, 2008. — P. 150. — 735 p. — ISBN 978-5-8243-1031-3.
- Гродзинскій (in Russian) // Члены Государственной Думы (портреты и биографии). Третий созыв. 1907—1912 гг. / Сост. М. М. Боиович. — Москва, 1913. — P. 209. — 526 p.
- Сафонов Д. А. Гродзицкий, Митрофан Иосифович (in Russian) // Башкирская энциклопедия. — Уфа: ГАУН «Башкирская энциклопедия», 2013. — ISBN 978-5-88185-306-8
