= Metrophanes (hieromartyr) =

Chinese Orthodox saint (1855–1900)

Hieromartyr Metrophanes 彌特若梵
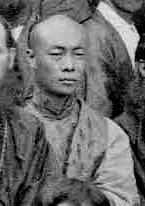
- A segment of an 1882 photograph of Metrophanes.
- Born: December 10, 1855; Qing Dynasty
- Died: June 10, 1900 (aged 44); Beijing, Qing Dynasty
- Venerated in: Eastern Orthodox Church
- Feast: June 11

Hieromartyr Metrophanes (Chinese: 彌特若梵; pinyin: Mítèruòfàn) a.k.a. Mitrophan, Metrophanes Chi Sung, or Chang Tzi-tzung (December 10, 1855 – June 10, 1900) was the first Russian Orthodox priest of Chinese descent to be ordained and also one of its first Chinese martyrs. He was killed in 1900, along with most of his family members and church followers in Beijing during the Boxer Rebellion in the Qing Dynasty. He is one of the 222 Chinese Martyrs glorified as saints by the Eastern Orthodox Church. Also considered martyrs were his wife Tatiana, his sons Isaiah and John, and Isaiah's fiancee Maria, who were all killed with him.

== Background ==
The Russian Orthodox Church had already been evangelizing to the Chinese people since the establishment of the Russian Spiritual Mission in Beijing in 1685, and many Chinese people became Eastern Orthodox Christians. However, no Chinese man had become an Orthodox priest before Metrophanes.

== Early life ==
Metrophanes was born with a typical Han name, Chang Yangji (Chinese: 常楊吉; pinyin: Cháng Yángjí). He was raised by his mother, Marina, and grandmother, Ekaterina, after his father died when he was a child. He was seen as a very quiet and humble person by others. Upon baptism he was given a typical Greek-language Orthodox name (see Metrophanes).

He was educated at the Russian mission in Beijing by the juren Longyuan (Chinese: 举人隆源; pinyin: Jǔrén Lóngyuán) who prepared him for eventual service in the Russian Orthodox priesthood. The local archimandrite Palladius also encouraged him, but Metrophanes initially felt reluctant to take up such a position because he believed he was not qualified. He reportedly said,

"How can a person with insufficient abilities and charity dare to accept this great rank?"

After a while, Metrophanes was officially ordained as a priest by Bishop Nicholas of Japan in 1880, at age 25. For fifteen years, he served in the mission under another archimandrite, Flavian, and aided him in various activities such as translating books from Chinese into Russian. During this period, he was relentlessly mocked and taken advantage of by others for his generosity, even including fellow Christians. Eventually, he had a mental breakdown and left the mission for about three years.

== Boxer Rebellion and death ==
Metrophanes' relatively uneventful life as a priest was ended when the Boxer Rebellion broke out in Northeastern China in 1900. The Boxers (Chinese: 義和團; pinyin: Yìhétuán) were a secret society who practiced martial arts and wanted to destroy foreign influence in China. They initially rebelled against the Qing dynasty but then united with them to attack their perceived enemies.

During the rebellion, the Boxers brutally killed and tortured hundreds of Christians and foreigners, using methods such as disembowelment, death by burning and beheading. Many were forced to recant their faith to avoid being killed.

On June 1, the Boxers attacked and destroyed Metrophanes' church and print shop which forced Metrophanes to shelter in his own home with his family, where he hid with many other Christians. During that 9-day-period, he ministered to them; even to those who had mistreated him in the past, and attempted to comfort them in the face of certain death. On June 7, His son, Isaiah, a member of the army, was beheaded near the Pingzemen Gates (Chinese: 平則門; pinyin: Píngzémén).

Finally, on June 10, after the Boxers reached Metrophanes' house, they killed him along with most others who were inside, which included 19-year-old Maria, the fiance of the late Isaiah and Metrophanes' 7-year-old son John. Maria had stayed behind to help others escape the incoming onslaught of the Boxers. She had been told by her brother-in-law Sergei to escape but she refused, saying,

"I was born near the church of the Mother of God, and I will die right here."

Metrophanes himself was stabbed under a date tree in the chest and died. He was 44. John suffered the worst fate, having had his shoulders slashed and nose, ears, and toes amputated. Maria had previously helped him escape by hiding him in an outhouse but he was later found asking neighbors for water and was denied. He was also mocked and called an èr máo zi (Chinese: 二毛子), a term meaning "secondary foreigner" meant to disparage him for his Orthodox religion. He rebutted this, claiming he was only a follower of God. After being asked if his injuries pained him, he claimed to not suffer for the cause of Christ. When John was captured again by the Boxers, he was reportedly calm as he was led away to be killed. An old man nearby attempted to intercede for him, saying that it was not his fault that he was raised as a Christian, to no avail.

As for Metrophanes' wife Tatiana, she had initially escaped the slaughter with Maria's aid but was later captured and beheaded near Andingmen (Chinese: 安定門; pinyin: Āndìngmén).

Metrophanes' son Sergei Chang was the only survivor out of his entire family. He had also escaped the slaughter of June 10 as Tatiana and John did but was not caught, and eventually became an Archpriest.

== Canonization ==
The Chinese Martyrs were first approved for local veneration by the Holy Synod of the Russian Orthodox Church in 1902. On February 3, 2016, the Bishops' Council of the Russian Orthodox Church blessed the church-wide veneration of Hieromartyr Metrophanes and the many martyrs who suffered with him.
