= Group technology =

Manufacturing technique

Group technology or TZ is a manufacturing technique in which parts having similarities in geometry, manufacturing process and/or functions are manufactured in one location using a small number of machines or processes. Group technology is based on a general principle that many problems are similar and by grouping similar problems, a single solution can be found to a set of problems, thus saving time and effort.

The group of similar parts is known as part family and the group of machineries used to process an individual part family is known as machine cell. It is not necessary for each part of a part family to be processed by every machine of corresponding machine cell. This type of manufacturing in which a part family is produced by a machine cell is known as cellular manufacturing. The manufacturing efficiencies are generally increased by employing GT because the required operations may be confined to only a small cell and thus avoiding the need for transportation of in-process parts.

Group technology is an approach in which similar parts are identified and grouped together in order to take advantage of the similarities in design and production. Similarities among parts permit them to be classified into part families.

The advantage of GT can be divided into three groups:

1. Engineering
2. Manufacturing
3. Process Planning

Disadvantages of GT Manufacturing :

1. Involves less manufacturing flexibility
2. Increases the machine down time as machines are grouped as cells which may not be functional throughout the production process.
