= Mitrofan Lodyzhensky =

Mitrofan Vasilyevich Lodyzhensky
- Born: 27 February 1852; Tula Governorate, Russian Empire
- Died: 31 May 1917 (aged 65)

Philosophical work
- Era: 19th-century philosophy
- Region: Russian philosophy
- School: Christian Mysticism
- Main interests: Asceticism, Mysticism, Esotericism

Mitrofan Vasilyevich Lodyzhensky (Russian: Митрофа́н Васи́льевич Лоды́женский, in some sources Лады́женский (Ladyzhensky); 27 February [O.S. 15 February] 1852 – 31 May [O.S. 18 May] 1917) was a Russian religious philosopher, playwright, and statesman, best known for his Mystical Trilogy comprising Super-consciousness and the Ways to Achieve It, Light Invisible, and Dark Force.

== Biography ==
Lodyzhensky was born on 27 February 1852 near Tula in the Russian Empire. He was the son of Vasily Vasilyevich and Olga Alekseyevna Lodyzhensky. Descended from a long line of Russian nobility, he was the distant relative of composer Nikolai Lodyzhensky. He had a religious upbringing and most of his immediate family—his father, mother, and three of his four sisters—all became monastics.

In 1873, Lodyzhensky graduated from the St. Petersburg Agricultural Institute. He served as a senior forester with the new Forestry Department of Vologda Governorate. In Tula, he was a land captain (overseer) of the Chernsky District. In 1881, he married his wife Olga Pavlovna (or Aleksandrovna according to some sources), which resulted in a happy marriage of over thirty years. (Lodyzhensky rose through the ranks of the Forestry Department, becoming its head from 1884 to 1886. He then consecutively served as lieutenant governor of several regions: Semipalatinsk (1896–1898), Vitebsk, and Mogilev. Through his years of public service, Lodyzhensky eventually reached the rank of state counsellor and was awarded with the Order of St. Vladimir (3rd and 4th class), the Order of St. Stanislaus (2nd and 3rd class), and the Order of St. Anna (3rd class). Nevertheless, he always had financial difficulties and was forced to apply for a pension from the Ministry of Internal Affairs. After retirement, he and his wife traveled the world, going to India, Egypt, and Japan. He also took up literary work, writing several plays—Iz novenkikh (Brand New) and Lozhny vzglyad (False View)—which performed well at the Russian Dramatic Theatre in Moscow.

Lodyzhensky's main interest, however, was in mysticism and esotericism, especially Theosophy. He was a member and secretary of the Russian Theosophical Society, and friends with the esotericist P.D. Ouspensky. Like Helena Blavatsky, Lev Tikhomirov, and other contemporary thinkers, he attempted to synthesize philosophy, religion, and mysticism into a unified way of life. He was familiar with the Hindu yogic tradition, drawing a parallel between it and Eastern Orthodox mysticism with the implicit belief that they were essentially the same. At a November 1909 meeting of the St. Petersburg Religious-Philosophical Society dedicated to Theosophy, Lodyzhensky declared, “It is possible to be a true Christian and a true Theosophist.” However, he later became convinced of the inherent incompatibility of Theosophy with Christianity, and reaffirmed his Russian Orthodox faith. His magnum opus, the Mystical Trilogy, which examines the differences between Eastern Orthodoxy and other mystical traditions, reflects this shift in views. The books were well received. In their reviews of Light Invisible, Bishop Nikon (Bessonov) of Yenisei-Krasnoyarsk highly recommended it, and Sergei Glagolev of the Moscow Theological Academy (despite some reservations) states that Lodyzhensky “simply, clearly, and convincingly established the apologetical significance of mystical phenomena from an Orthodox perspective.”

In the summer of 1910, Lodyzhensky and his wife Olga stayed in the village of Basovo, which was located only a few miles from Yasnaya Polyana, the estate of the writer Leo Tolstoy. The Lodyzhenskys called upon Tolstoy in late July. The composer Aleksandr Goldenweiser, one of Tolstoy's close friends, refers to Lodyzhensky as “very loud and talkative,” and Sofia Tolstoy, the author's wife, describes the Lodyzhenskys as “interesting, lively people.” Lodyzhensky and Tolstoy spoke about yoga, hypnotism, Theosophy, and Christian asceticism, introducing him to the Philokalia, one of the principal collections of spiritual texts for the Eastern Orthodox Church. A few days later, Tolstoy visited Lodyzhensky to continue the discussion on the Philokalia. This was their last meeting; Tolstoy died not long afterward.

In his later years, Lodyzhensky continued to write, collaborating with the St. Petersburg journal Veshnie vody (Spring Waters) and publishing his last work, Nevidimye volny (Invisible Waves), in 1917.

Lodyzhensky died on 31 May 1917. He is buried with his wife Olga at the cemetery of the now-defunct Dormition Convent in Tula.

== Published works ==
- (1906) Sverkhsoznanie i puti k ego dostizheniyu (Сверхсознание и пути к его достижению (Super-consciousness and the Ways to Achieve It))
- (1911) Indusskaya Radzha-Ioga i khristianskoe podvizhnichestvo (Индусская Раджа-Йога и христианское подвижничество (Hindu Rāja Yoga and Christian Asceticism))
- (1912) Svet nezrimyi (Свет Незримый) English translation: Light Invisible: Satisfying the Thirst for Happiness (2011, Holy Trinity Publications; ISBN 9780884651871)
- (1914) Temnaya sila (Темная сила (Dark Force))
- (1916) Vragi Khristianstva (Враги Христианства (The Enemies of Christianity))
- (1917) Nevidimye volny. Povest v pyati chasyakh. (Невидимые волны. Повесть в пяти частях. (Invisible Waves: A Story in Five Parts))

In English:

- Light Invisible: Satisfying the Thirst for Happiness. Lodyzhenskii, M. V. translated by Mother Magdelena of Novo Divievo Monastery. Holy Trinity Publications, 2011. ISBN 9780884651871
- Superconsciousness and the Ways to Achieve It: A Study of Raja Yoga and Christian Asceticism. Lodyzhensky, M. V. translated by Yury Pankratov. Aeon Books, 2026. ISBN 9781801521208
