= Sergei Mitrofanov =

Russian industrial engineer (1915–2003)

- Born: Sergei Petrovich Mitrofanov; 25 September 1915; Petrograd, Russian Empire
- Died: 24 October 2003 (aged 88); Saint Petersburg, Russia
- Awards: Order of Lenin; Lenin Prize
- Scientific career
- Fields: Optics, spectroscopy
- Institutions: College of Precise Mechanics and Optics, Institute for Precise Mechanics and Optics

Sergei Petrovich Mitrofanov (Russian: Сергей Петрович Митрофанов; 25 September 1915 – 24 October 2003) was a Soviet and Russian scientist in the field of industrial engineering.

== Career ==
He graduated from the Technical School of Precise Mechanics and Optics in 1933 and Institute of Precise Mechanics and Optics with a specialisation in Precise Mechanics in 1939.

From 1939 until 1951, he had been working in LOMO and occupied positions of Engineer, Head of Technical Office, Head of the Production, Senior Technologist. Lived through Siege of Leningrad, awarded Order of the Patriotic War in 1992.

He was the creator of Group Components Processing Method.

Over the 1951 to 1961 period, he took significant part in the political work. He became The First Secretary of Communist Party District Committee. In 1954, he received position of Science and Engineering Secretary of Communist Party District Committee.

From 1961, Sergei Mitrofanov took an important part in LITMO live. He had been occupying the Rector position from 1961 till 1974. Also, he was the Head of the Tool Engineering Department (1961–89). In 1962, he was elected professor of the Tool Engineering Department.

He received PhD degree in Technical Science in 1953 and became Doctor of Sciences in 1961. He became Chief Scientist of USSR Ministry of the Defence Engineering (1962). He also became Academician of Saint Petersburg Engineering Academy in 1992. He was also awarded degree of Honoured Master of Sciences and Engineering. He is an author of more than 20 monographs.

The most important scientific results:

- S. P. Mitrofanov, Science basis of Group Components Processing Method
- S. P. Mitrofanov, Yu. A. Gulnov, D. D. Kulicov Automatization of Technological Processes in Serial Production (Russian: Автоматизация технологической подготовки сеpийного пpоизводства), Moscow, 1974.
- S. P. Mitrofanov, Yu. A. Gulnov, D. D. Kulicov ECM Usage in Production Technology (Russian: Применение ЭВМ в технологической подготовке производства.), Moscowm 1981.
- S. P. Mitrofanov, D. D. Kulikov, O. N. Milayev, B. S. Padun, Technology of Flexible Production Schemes Preproduction (Russian: Технологическая подготовка гибких производственных систем), St. Petersburg, 1987.

== Awards and honors ==
- Order of Lenin (1957)
- Lenin Prize (1959)
- Order of the Badge of Honour (1967)
- Order of the Patriotic War, 2nd class (1992)
- Order of Honour (2000)
