= Timothy Richard =

Welsh missionary

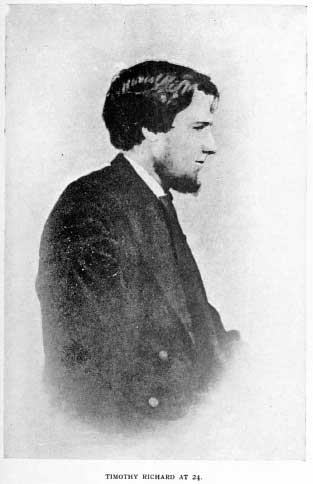
- Portrait of Timothy Richard at age 24
- Born: 10 October 1845; Carmarthenshire, Wales
- Died: 17 April 1919 (aged 73); London
- Education: Haverfordwest Baptist College, Wales
- Spouses: Mary Martin (m. 1878) Dr. Ethel Tribe (m. 1914)
- Parent(s): Timothy and Eleanor Richard

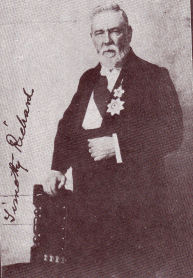
Timothy Richard

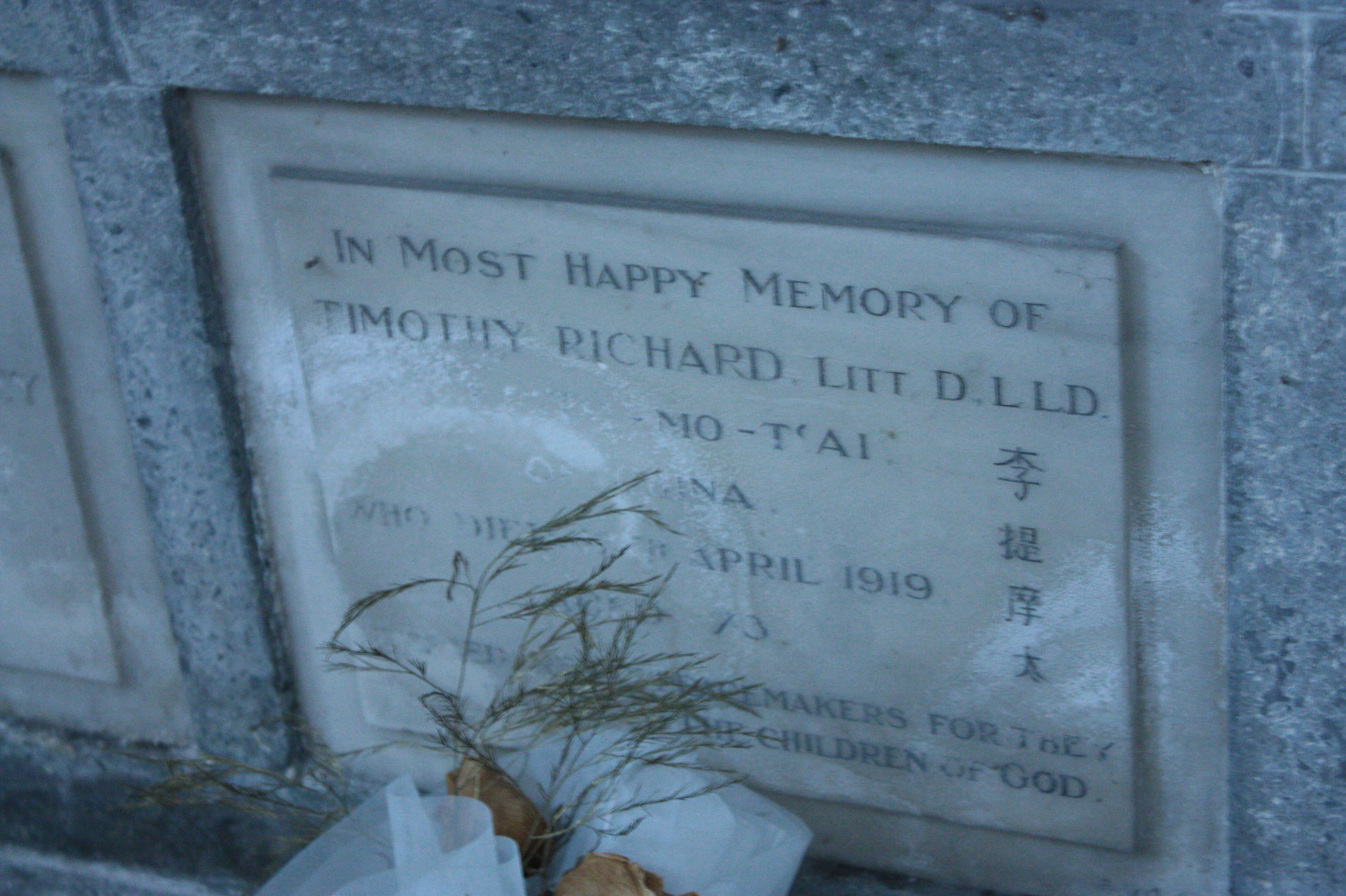
The ashes of Timothy Richard, Golders Green Crematorium

Timothy Richard (Chinese: 李提摩太 Li Timotai, 10 October 1845 – 17 April 1919) was a Welsh Baptist missionary to China, who influenced the modernisation of China and the rise of the Chinese Republic.

== Biography ==
Richard was born on 10 October 1845 in Ffaldybrenin, Carmarthenshire in south Wales, the son of Timothy and Eleanor Richard, a devout Baptist farming family. Inspired by the Second Evangelical Awakening to become a missionary, Richard left teaching to enter Haverfordwest Theological College in 1865. There he dedicated himself to China, where he had an active role in relief operations during the Northern Chinese Famine of 1876–1879. He was a leader in promoting anti-foot binding and gender equality in China.

Richard applied to the newly formed China Inland Mission, but Hudson Taylor considered that he would be of better service to the denominational Baptist missions. In 1869 the Baptist Missionary Society (BMS) accepted Richard's application, and assigned him to Yantai in Shandong.

In 1897 Richard undertook a journey to India to discover the conditions of the Christian mission there. Travelling with a young missionary, Arthur Gostick Shorrock, they visited Ceylon, Madras, Agra, Benares, Delhi, Calcutta and finally Bombay.

Timothy Richard helped the Qing government to deal with the aftermath of the Taiyuan massacre during the Boxer Rebellion. He thought its main cause was lack of education of the population, so he proposed to Qing court official Li Hongzhang to establish a modern university in Taiyuan with Boxer Indemnity to the Great Britain, and his proposal was approved later. In 1902, Timothy Richard represented the British government to establish Shanxi University, one of the three earliest modern universities in China. Timothy Richard was in charge of the fund to build Shanxi University until ten years later in 1912. During that period, he also served as the head of the College of Western Studies in Shanxi University.

In China, Timothy Richard became a contributor to the monthly Wan Guo Gong Bao, or Review of the Times, which Young John Allen founded and edited from 1868 to 1907. This paper was "said ... to have done more for reform than any other single agency in China". The Review attracted a wide and influential Chinese readership throughout its thirty-nine year run. One of the ways in which the Review appealed to a broad, scholarly audience was through its discussion of current events and economics. During the First Sino-Japanese War period of 1894–1895, essay titles included: "International Intercourse, by a descendant of Confucius", "How to Enrich a Nation, by Dr. Joseph Edkins", "The Prime Benefits of Christianity, by the Rev. Timothy Richard", and "On the Suppression of Doubt and the Acceptance of Christ, by Sung Yuh-kwei". The articles attributed practical applications to the Christian faith and portrayed Christianity as a useful concept for the Chinese, one that Allen and his contributors intended to portray on an equal level to concepts such as market economics and international law. The Qing reformer Kang Youwei once said of the publication: "I owe my conversion to reform chiefly on the writings of two missionaries, the Rev. Timothy Richard and the Rev. Dr. Young J. Allen."

Richard also translated Looking Backward into Chinese as 百年一覺 Bainian Yi Jiao, and part of Wu Cheng'en's novel Journey to the West into English.

Richard's papers are preserved in the BMS archives at Regent's Park College, Oxford.

On death in April 1919, Richard was cremated, and his ashes placed in the columbarium of Golders Green Crematorium. The memorial tablet is largely in Chinese.

== Works ==
- Richard, Timothy (1905). Some Hints for Rising Statesman.
- Richard, Timothy (1906). Calendar of the Gods in China. Methodist Publishing House.
- Richard, Timothy (1907). Conversion by the Million in China: Being Biographies and Articles, 2 vols. Shanghai: Christian Literature Society. Volume One, Volume Two
- Richard, Timothy (1916). Forty-Five Years in China. New York: Frederick A. Stokes.
