= No value added =

Business management term of the 1980s

No value added (NVA) is a management term loosely related to the lean manufacturing movement as codified in the 1980s by a landmark MIT study of the automobile industry, which explained lean production for the first time.

No Value Added programs can be formal or whimsical. Generally, they involved seeking input and opinion from every level of the organization about rules, processes or process elements which are said to be "no value added".

In one form, the proponent of an activity accused of being NVA must defend it, or suspend it.

In a milder form, the proponent (or process owner) of an activity accused of being NVA is simply informed that it is seen in that light. Oddly, this milder form is often effective because in a large organization, the original reason for an activity can be long forgotten, similar to cabooses which came into use in the 1830s, but eventually had no useful purpose and became NVA.

Some claim that this NVA is a jibe at Net Value Added accounting methods, which were held in low esteem by some Lean advocates, and high esteem by others.

== See also ==
- Added value
- Value added
