= Taiyuan massacre =

1900 mass killing of Christians and missionaries in Taiyuan, Shanxi province, China

- Part of Boxer Rebellion
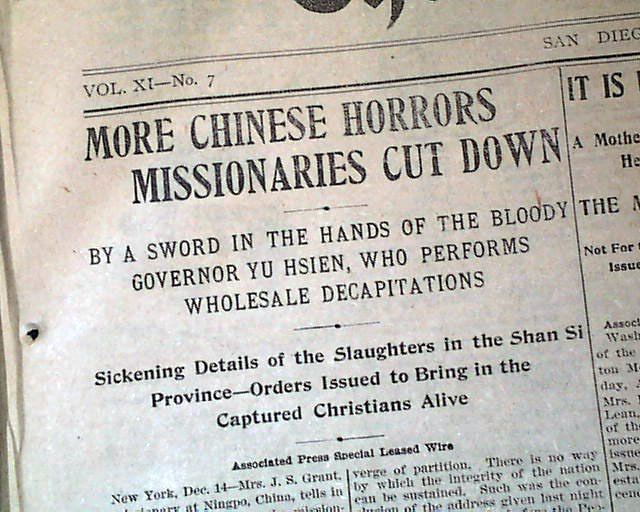
- account at the time
- Location: Taiyuan, Shanxi province, North China
- Date: July 9, 1900
- Target: Foreigners, Christians
- Attack type: Massacre
- Deaths: 45 Christian men, women and children
- Victim: Christians
- Perpetrator: Disputed

The Taiyuan massacre took place during the Boxer Rebellion, July 9, 1900, in Taiyuan, Shanxi province, North China. Sources recall that they were killed in the presence of Yuxian, governor of Shanxi. 44 people were killed.

== Before the 1900 massacre ==
By the late 19th century, there were long-established Christian communities. Catholic missionaries first came to Shanxi in 1633, and Protestant churches were established in 1865.

== Massacre ==
Protestant and Catholic missionaries and their Chinese parishioners were massacred throughout northern China, some by Boxers and others by government troops and authorities. After the declaration of war on Western powers in June 1900, Yuxian, who had been named governor in March, implemented a brutal anti-foreign and anti-Christian policy. On 9 July, reports circulated that he had executed forty-four foreigners from missionary families whom he had invited to the provincial capital Taiyuan under the promise to protect them. By the summer's end, more foreigners and as many as 2,000 Chinese Christians had been put to death in the province. Journalist and historical writer Nat Brandt called the massacre of Christians in Shanxi "the greatest single tragedy in the history of Christian evangelicalism."

The two most prominent murdered Catholics were Italian bishops Gregory Grassi (born 1833) and Francis Fogolla (born 1839), both of whom were canonised Saints by Pope John Paul II on 1 October 2000. Their companions of martyrdom were three other Franciscan friars, seven Franciscan Missionaries of Mary, 11 Chinese members of the Third Order of St. Francis — of whom six were seminarians — and three Chinese employees of the Franciscan mission of Taiyuan in the Apostolic Vicariate of Northern Shansi.

== Dispute ==
An essay by Roger Thompson suggested that mob violence was responsible for the massacre, rather than Yuxian, on the basis that the most widely circulated accounts were by people who could not have seen the events and that these accounts appeared to follow earlier martyr literature. However, another study found that the various accounts from the time appeared to agree on the otherwise skeletal narrative. In any case, this event became a notorious symbol of Chinese anger.

== Legacy ==
The Shansi Imperial University at Taiyuan was founded in 1901 with funds from the indemnity levied against Shansi for the massacre of the Christians by the Boxers. During the first decade of the university its chancellor was the Baptist missionary Timothy Richard who also headed the Western College.

The Catholics murdered in the massacre were subsequently canonized by Pope John Paul II on 1 October 2000 as part of the 120 Martyrs of China.

== References and further reading ==
- Brandt, Nat (1994). Massacre in Shansi. Syracuse, N.Y.: Syracuse University Press. ISBN 0815602820.
- Clark, Anthony E. (2013), "Mandarins and Martyrs of Taiyuan, Shanxi, in Late Imperial China", in Clark, Anthony E. (ed.), A Voluntary Exile: Chinese Christianity and Cultural Confluence since 1552, Rowman & Littlefield, pp. 93–116, ISBN 9781611461480
- Clements, Ronald; Bell, Prudence (2014). Lives from a Black Tin Box. Milton Keynes: Authentic Media. ISBN 978-1860249310.
- Cohen, Paul A. (1997). History in Three Keys: The Boxers as Event, Experience, and Myth. New York: Columbia University Press. ISBN 0231106505.
- Esherick, Joseph (1987). The Origins of the Boxer Uprising. Berkeley: University of California Press. ISBN 0520058283.
- Thompson, Roger R (2007), "Reporting the Taiyuan Massacre: culture and politics in the China war of 1900", in Tiedemann, R. G.; Robert A. Bickers (eds.), The Boxers, China, and the World, Lanham, MD: Rowman & Littlefield, pp. 65–92

Accounts from the time

- Broomhall, Marshall, ed. (1900). Martyred Missionaries Of The China Inland Mission: With A Record Of The Perils & Sufferings Of Some Who Escaped. London: Morgan & Scott.
- E. H. Edwards (1903). Fire and Sword in Shansi: The Story of the Martyrdom of Foreigners and Chinese Christians. Oliphant Anderson & Ferrier.
- Arnold Henry Savage Landor, China and the Allies (New York: Scribner's, 1901). 01008198 Google Books:

== See also ==
- China Martyrs of 1900 (Protestants)
- Martyr Saints of China (Catholics)
- Metrophanes, Chi Sung (Orthodox)
- Oberlin Band (China)
- List of massacres in China
