= Cao Prefecture =

Former prefecture in China (6th century to 1913)

Cao Prefecture within Shandong, 1820

Caozhou or Cao Prefecture (曹州) was a zhou (prefecture) in imperial China centering on modern Heze or Cao County in Shandong, China. It existed (intermittently) from the 6th century to 1913.

== Geography ==
Under the Sui, Cao Prefecture included Yuanqu County. The administrative region of Caozhou in the Tang dynasty is in the border region of modern southwestern Shandong and eastern Henan. It probably includes parts of modern:

- Under the administration of Heze, Shandong:
  - Heze
  - Cao County
  - Dingtao County
  - Chengwu County
  - Dongming County
- Under the administration of Shangqiu, Henan:
  - Minquan County
