= Yangliujie Catholic Church =

Former Catholic church in Zunyi, Guizhou

- 杨柳街天主堂
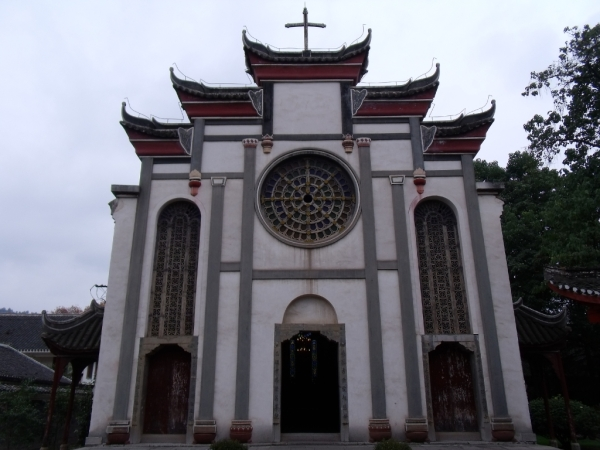
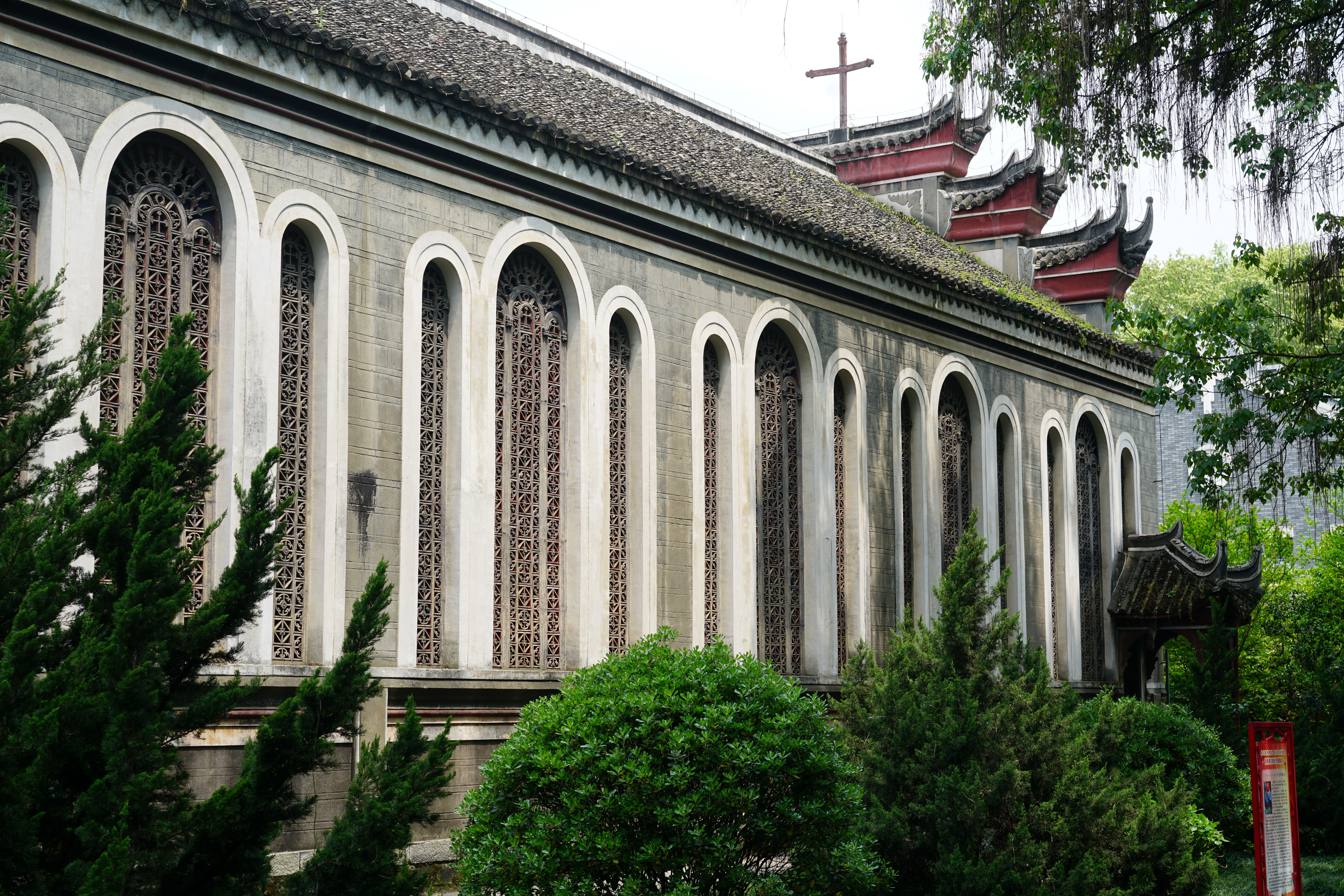
- The façade and right side of the church
- Yangliujie Catholic Church
- 27°41′37″N 106°55′04″E
- Location: Zunyi, Guizhou
- Country: China
- Denomination: Catholic Church (1897–1951)

Administration
- Archdiocese: Guiyang (1897–1951)

Yangliujie Catholic Church is a former Catholic church in Zunyi, Guizhou, China. (Note: In French sources, "Zunyi" is romanised as Tsen-y, and "Guizhou" as Kouy-tcheou.) It was completed in 1897 after several anti-Christian riots in Zunyi in the 19th century. On the course of the Long March, the Chinese Red Army used the church to host its political directorate during the Zunyi Conference in January 1935. It was given to the local government in 1951, renovated, and opened to the general public in 1985 as a part of the site of the Zunyi Conference.

== History ==
According to Adrien Launay, in 1866, the Apostolic Vicar of Guizhou Louis-Simon Faurie divided his ecclesiastical province into two vicariates, with Zunyi being the seat of the northern one. By the end of 1867, Zunyi had five groups of Christians. In the same year, the French priest Simon-Jude-Alphonse Mihières purchased lands and houses for a location to host worship. In 1869 there was an anti-Christian riot in Zunyi. The church and the priests' house were looted, and 25 to 30 Christians were killed.

In 1874, the French priest Eugène-Charles Bouchard purchased a local house and founded a church in Zunyi. A 1876 letter recorded that the church in Zunyi was under the patronage of the Blessed Virgin Mary. In 1884 tensions between Christians and Zunyi populace rose again in Zunyi. Rioters destroyed the priests' house and attempted to burn down the church. Launay estimated a loss of 250,000 francs. There was another attack in 1886. An 1896 French-Qing agreement allowed the missionaries to return to Zunyi. The current church building was completed in 1897.

The Paris Foreign Missions Society (MEP) recorded the presence of the Chinese Red Army in the Apostolic Vicariate of Guiyang in 1935, noting that the army pillaged its residences and used them to station troops. In particular, when the army occupied Zunyi several times in 1935, Catholic missionaries had to flee to local Christian families or into the mountains. According to Chinese sources, the Red Army first arrived in Zunyi in January 1935 on its Long March, and its political directorate (Note: 红军总政治部; Hóngjūn Zǒngzhèngzhìbù. After the establishment of the PRC, it became the General Political Department of the People's Liberation Army.) was stationed at the church during the Zunyi Conference, a CCP Politburo meeting that reorganised its leadership. At the church, the political directorate convened a town hall with representatives from the local people and a meeting that delivered the resolutions of the Zunyi Conference to Red Army officers. During the Battle of Chishui River, the Red Army returned to Zunyi. The CCP Central Committee held another meeting at the church to summarise its military experience. The missionaries returned after the army left. According to the MEP, the army did not destroy any of its churches or houses in Zunyi, but "all things were looted".

After the PRC was established in 1949, in 1951 the Zunyi government sought to use the church as part of the memorial for the Zunyi Conference. The church was given to the government in exchange of houses of the same size in the Sifangtai (四方台) area of the city, and the Catholic congregation moved in 1952. China's National Cultural Heritage Administration (NCHA) funded the church building's renovation in 1978. In December 1983, the church was included into the "Site of the Zunyi Conference", a Major Historical and Cultural Site Protected at the National Level of China. After another round of NCHA renovation in 1984, it was opened to the general public in 1985.

== Architecture ==
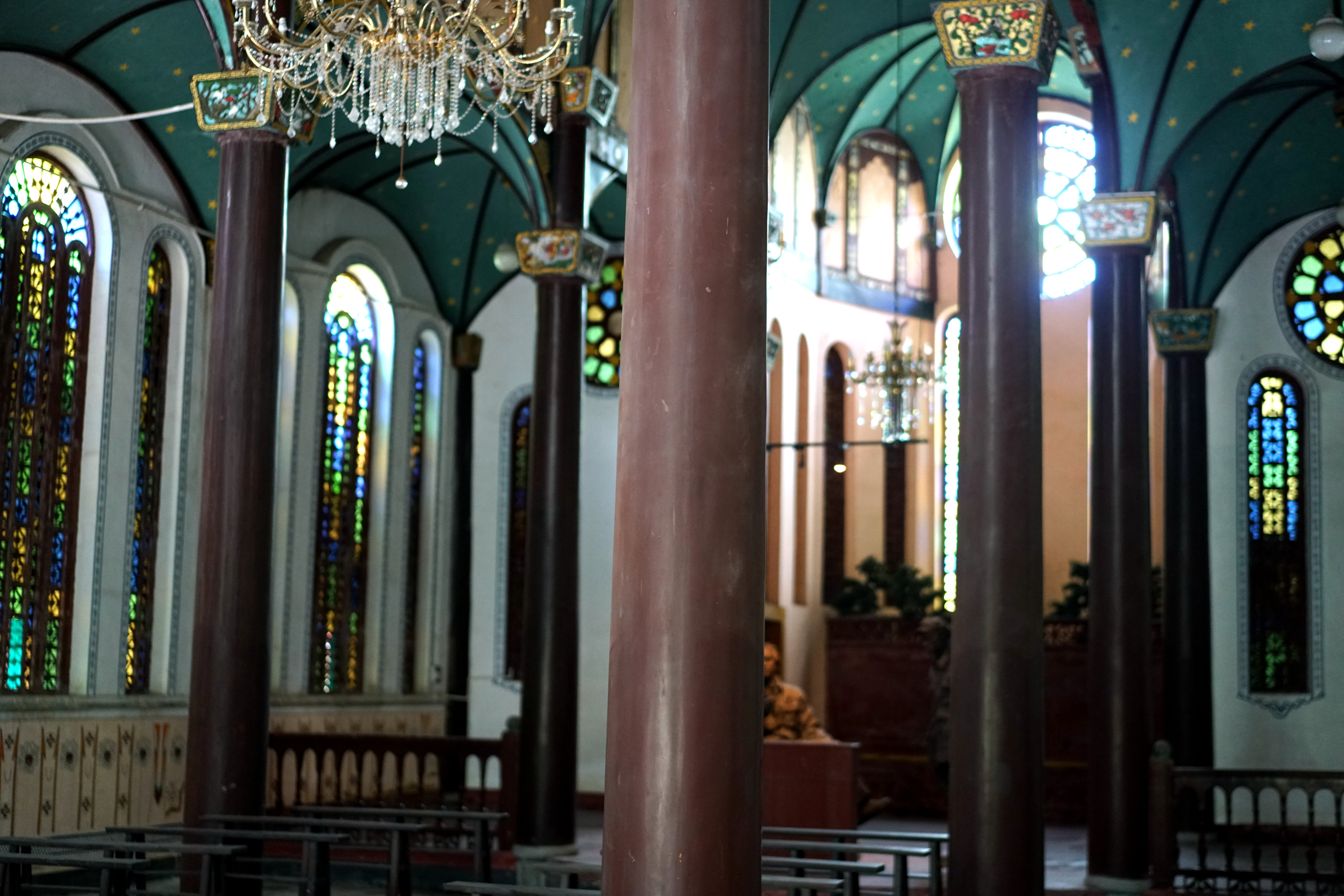
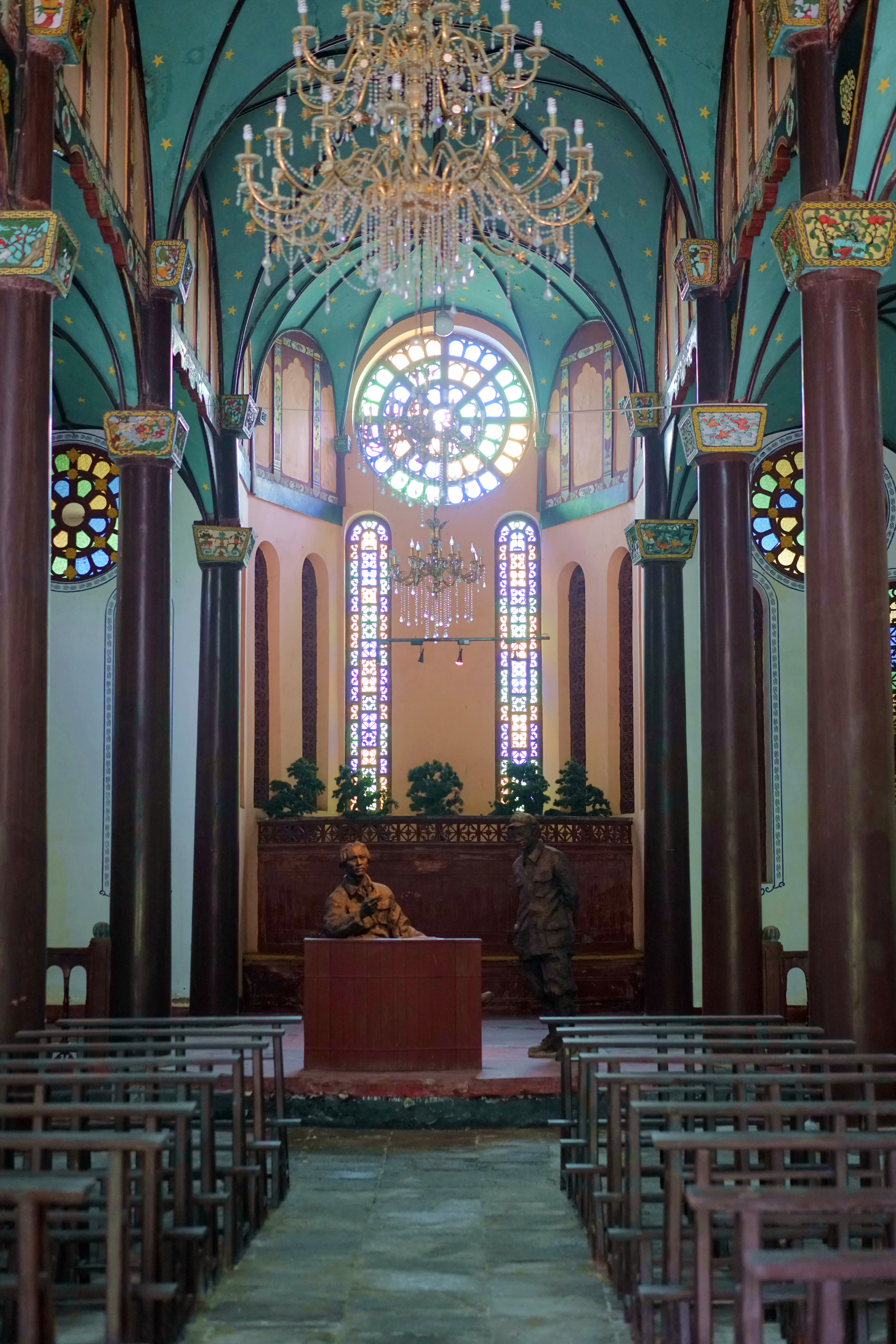
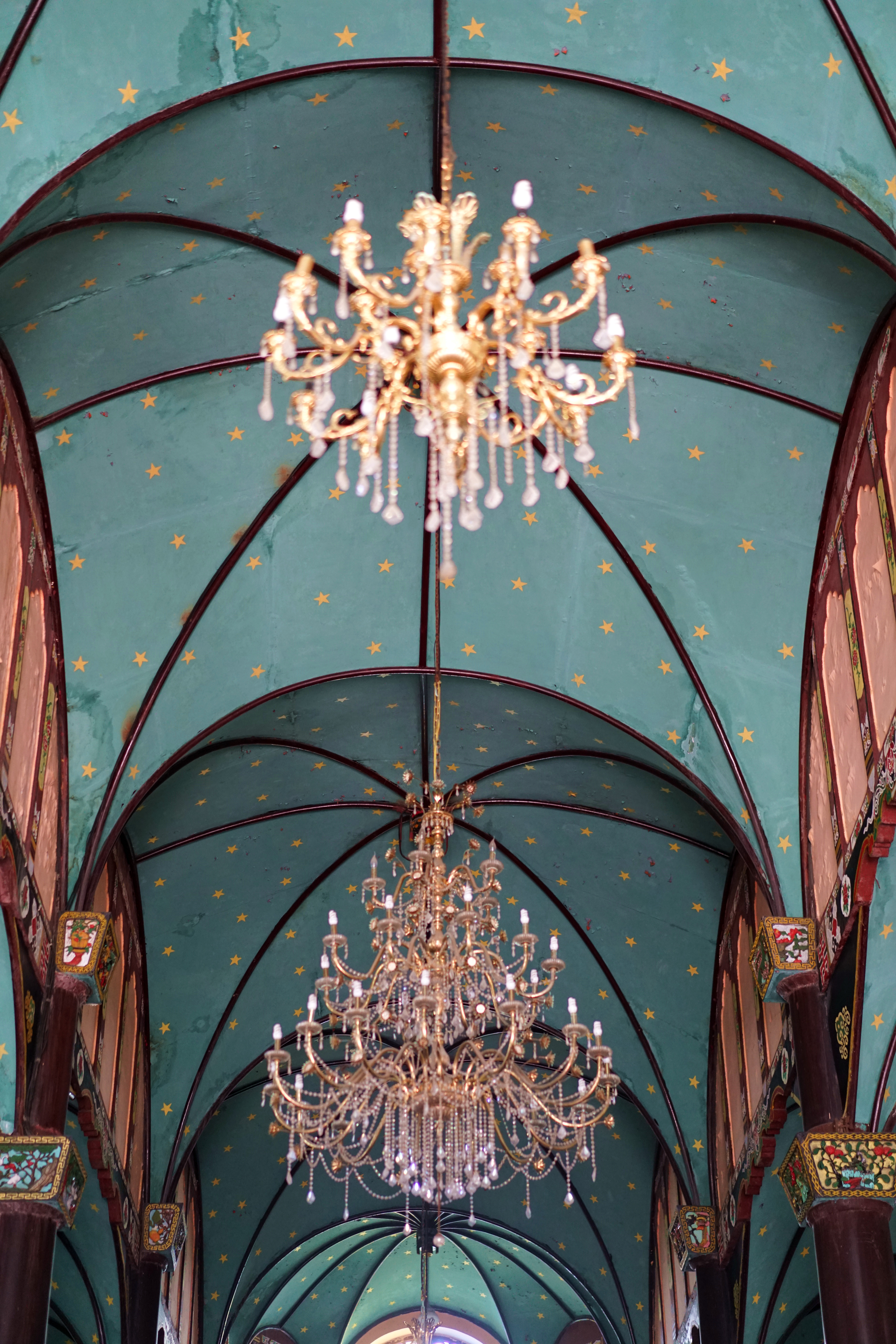
The interior of the church (top). The chancel (left) exhibits a scene of the political directorate. The vaulted ceiling (right) is painted with stars.

The church building is 36.5 m (120 ft) long and 14.5 m (48 ft) wide. It has a total area of 382.5 m^{2} (4,117 sq ft). Its façade is in the form of a Chinese Pailou, with up-pointing flying eaves. Its gates are adorned with Chinese Duilian verses, and its pillars have Chinese pedestals. However, it also contains Neo-Romanesque arches and a rose window. In 1978, some parts of the church were rebuilt with reinforced concrete to strengthen its structure. The church's interior is supported by pillars with capitals depicting flowers and figures. It has a vaulted ceiling illuminated by chandeliers. The church is covered with traditional Chinese roof tiles. The church building has a Chinese-style quadrangle to its left, enclosed by its school house, offices, and residential house.

== See also ==
- St. Anne's Church, Moxi, used by the Chinese Red Army in 1935, with its missionaries killed
- Qiao'ergou Catholic Church, Yan'an, former church used by the CCP in the 1930s
- St. Joseph's Cathedral, Guiyang, 19th-century Catholic church in Guizhou still in use
- Christianity in Guizhou

== Sources ==
=== Magazines and periodicals ===
- Huang, Xian (30 January 2021). 遵义会议会址确认记 [Confirmation of the Site of the Zunyi Conference]. People's Daily Overseas Edition 人民日报海外版 (in Chinese).
- Pan, Kaimao (2012). 遵义会议期间红军总政治部旧址简介 [Site of the Political Directorate of the Chinese Red Army during the Zunyi Conference]. Zhongguo Diming 中国地名. No. 5. p. 13.
- Zhou, Jian (2018). 遵义杨柳街天主堂 营造自然生态之美 [Yangliujie Catholic Church, Zunyi: Creating Natural and Ecological Beauty]. Zhongguo Zongjiao 中国宗教 (in Chinese). pp. 76–77.
- 遵义杨柳街天主堂 [Yangliujie Catholic Church, Zunyi]. Zhongguo Minzubao 中国民族报 (in Chinese). 25 August 2020. Archived from the original on 21 April 2024.

=== Mission reports ===
- "Kweiyang". Rapport Annuel 1935 [Annual Report 1935] (in French). MEP (Paris Foreign Missions Society). 1935.

=== Books ===
- Launay, Adrien (1908). Histoire des missions de Chine: Mission du Kouy-Tcheou [History of the Chinese Missions: Mission in Guizhou] (in French). Vol. 2. Missions étrangères de Paris. ISBN 978-0-524-10133-9.
- ——— (1908b). Histoire des missions de Chine: Mission du Kouy-Tcheou [History of the Chinese Missions: Mission in Guizhou] (in French). Vol. 3. Missions étrangères de Paris. ISBN 978-0-524-10133-9.
