= Jean-Martin Moye =

French Catholic priest and missionary

Blessed Jean-Martin Moye
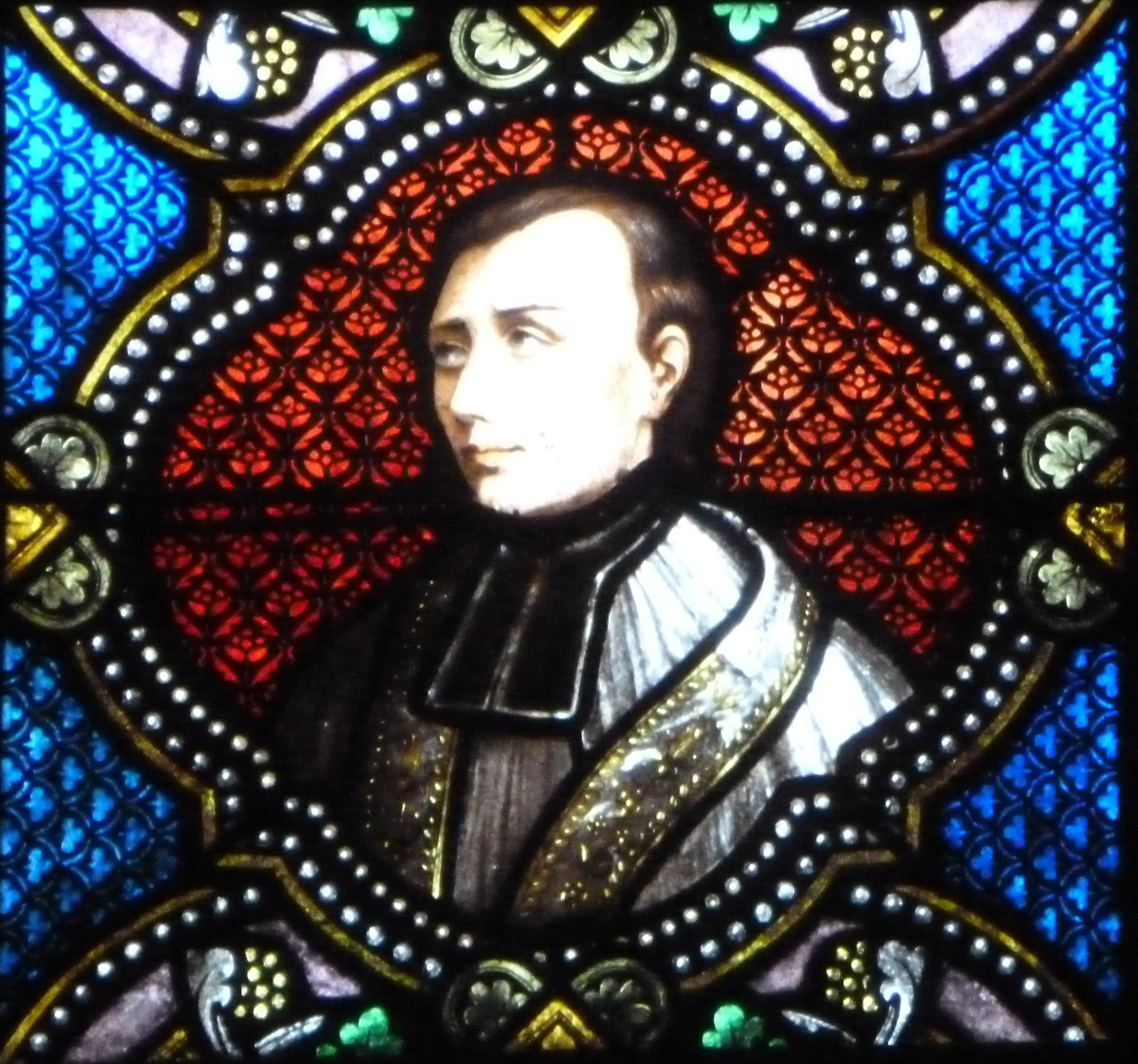
- Stained glass window depicting Jean-Martin Moye in Saint-Jean-de-Bassel

Priest
- Born: 27 January 1730; Cutting, Bailiwick of Dieuze, Duchy of Lorraine
- Died: 4 May 1793; Trier, Prince-Archbishopric of Trier, Holy Roman Empire
- Venerated in: Catholic Church (Lorraine and the Congregation of Divine Providence)
- Beatified: 21 November 1954 by Pope Pius XII
- Canonized: 21 May 1955
- Major shrine: Trier Germany
- Feast: 4 May

Jean-Martin Moye (written later in his life as Moÿe) was a French Catholic priest who served as a missionary in China and was the founder of the Sisters of the Congregation of Divine Providence. He also organized the first expression of consecrated life among the women of China. He was beatified by the Catholic Church in 1954.

== Early life ==
Moye was born on 27 January 1730 in the village of Cutting, then located within the Bailiwick of Dieuze, within the autonomous Duchy of Lorriane, a part of the Holy Roman Empire, now in the French Department of Moselle. He was the sixth of the thirteen children of Jean Moye and Anne Catharine Demange, part of a long-established and prosperous farming family of the region. The fervent Catholic faith of the family can be seen in the fact that, apart from Jean-Martin, a younger brother also became a priest, as well as five of his first cousins, and later two of his nephews.

Moye had an uneventful childhood, growing up on his family's extensive holdings. He received his basic education from his older brother, Jean-Jacques, a seminarian, who taught him until his untimely death in 1744 at the age of 24. Moye completed his education at the College of Pont-à-Mousson, following which he studied philosophy at the Jesuit College of Strasbourg. In the fall of 1751 he then entered the local diocesan Seminary of Saint-Simon in Metz, the same one at which his brother had studied. There one of his professors included Canon François Thiébaut, a noted Biblical scholar of the era, who would later serve as the representative of the local clergy to the Estates General.

== Priesthood ==
Moye was ordained a priest on 9 March 1754 by Louis-Joseph de Montmorency-Laval, the Bishop of Metz. Upon his ordination, he was granted a benefice by King Stanislas Leszczynski, the last Duke of Lorraine, of the income generated from the Chapel of St. Andrew in the cemetery of Dieuze. This income allowed him to accept the poorly paid office of Vicar for three different parishes in Metz, one of which, the Parish of the Holy Cross (French: Sainte-Croix), had Canon Thiébaut as pastor. He then undertook a number of different ministries as part of his service, among them acting as confessor for the seminarians of Saint-Simon.

The parish extended well beyond the city limits, and Moye undertook the spiritual care of the members of the parish living in the small and isolated hamlets in the countryside. Through this service he became aware of the need of education for the girls of the region, who lacked any access to schools. He conceived of a project to remedy this situation by placing volunteer teachers in these rural locations. The first volunteer was a working class woman, Marguerite Lecomte, whom he stationed in the hamlet of Saint-Hubert on 14 January 1762. She would remain in this post without disturbance throughout the upheavals of the French Revolution. Volunteers were quickly sent out to various other locations, going out as far as Freiburg im Breisgau, then in the Habsburg dominion.

== Writer ==
Out of the desire to provide the faithful of the parish with means to deepen their spiritual lives, Moye began to publish some tracts, in collaboration with a younger colleague, the Abbé Louis Jobal de Pagny (1737–1766). The first, in 1762, was a pamphlet entitled Du soin extrème qu'on doit avoir du Baptême des enfants. It treated the baptism of newborn infants, especially stillborn babies. It was a development of Abrégé de l’Embryologie sacrée, a work by a Sicilian moral theologian, Francesco Cangiamiglia, which had just been published in Paris, having originally been published in Sicily in 1745 with ecclesiastical approval.

In 1764 they re-published an older work by the 17th-century spiritual writer, Cardinal Pierre de Bérulle, Élévation à Dieu sur le mystère de l’Incarnation (Being raised to God through the mystery of the Incarnation) with their commentaries on the text. Later, after the unexpected death of Jobal, Moye published a small pamphlet entitled Recueil de diverses pratiques de piété (A Collection of various pious Practices).

== Opposition ==
Moye's work with rural education and his writings provoked criticism from certain elements of the city. He was accused with recklessness for his sending young women to live in the isolated hamlets of the countryside. He was further accused of rigorism in his dealing with penitents, as well as making unfair criticisms of both the clergy and of midwives in his writings on Baptism. They prevailed on Bishop de Montmorency-Laval to take action against the two authors. As a result, in May 1762, the bishop ordered Moye to suspend the sending out of volunteers – though those already in the countryside were left in their situations. He further transferred him from Metz to serve as vicar of Dieuze. As this was his native region, Moye did not consider it a punishment, but worried about the future of his volunteers, who were coming to be called the "poor Sisters". His coworkers in the project assured him that the setback was only temporary.

Moye was again accused of an extreme rigidity in his dealing with the people of the parish, such as those who came to him for confession. He also opposed the traditional festivities celebrated by the peasants during the year. This time the bishop responded more severely, and, during Holy Week of 1767, the most sacred period of the Christian year, Moye was suspended from his post. Over the course of the next year and a half, until 1768, he moved from parish to parish, providing the pastors with what help he could provide. Finally he was given refuge by the Grand Prior of the Abbey of Saint-Dié, an abbey nullius, independent of local bishops, where he was asked to help run a kind of minor seminary.

== Missionary ==
During his time at the abbey, Moye had two important developments in his life, the first being making the acquaintance of a local priest, Antoine Raulin, who had worked to develop education in the region. He also came to the decision to offer his services as a missionary to Asia. That following October he enrolled in the seminary of the Foreign Missions Society of Paris, which specialized in that work. He returned to Lorraine the following spring, where he visited the volunteers, now a religious institute called the Sisters of Providence, as well as preaching parish missions throughout the region. Apparently believing that he would not return from China, where he was to be sent, he formally renounced his family inheritance.

After completing the training period at the seminary, Moye was assigned to serve in the Apostolic Vicariate of Szechwan (Sichuan, western China). He then put the care of the Sisters of Providence in the hands of two colleagues who were admirers of their work, one of them being Raulin. He also appointed Marie Morel as their first Mother Superior. He left France for Sichuan on 30 December 1771. He would spend ten years in the Sichuanese missions, not returning to Paris until 6 June 1784. Nine years of mission work, frequently interrupted by persecution and imprisonment, made him realize the necessity of Chinese help. In 1773, he was appointed provicar in Eastern Szechwan (future Archdiocese of Chongqing) and Kweichow (future Archdiocese of Guiyang). The next year, he began evangelizing in Guizhou with a Sichuanese missionary, Benoît Sen. In 1782 he founded the "Christian Virgins", religious women following the rules of the Congregation of Providence at home, devoting themselves to the care of the sick and to the Christian instruction of Chinese women and children in their own homes.

== Death ==
Exhausted and ill, Moye returned to France in 1784. He resumed the direction of the Sisters of Divine Providence and evangelized Lorraine and Alsace by preaching missions. The French Revolution of 1791 drove him into exile, and with his Sisters he retired to Trier. After the capture of the city by the French troops, typhoid fever broke out and, helped by his Sisters, he devoted himself to hospital work. He contracted the disease and died in 1793.

Moye was buried in the cemetery of the cathedral. The cemetery, however, was closed in 1808 and paved over to form the Konstantinsplatz of the city. His grave has never been identified.

== Veneration ==
Moye's spiritual writings were approved by theologians on 10 June 1895. On 14 January 1891, his cause was formally opened, granting him the title of Servant of God. On 21 May 1945, Pope Pius XII declared him to be Venerable.

== See also ==
- Christianity in Guizhou
- Catholic Church in Sichuan

== Sources ==
- The entry cites:
  - MARCHAL, Vie de M. l'Abbé Moye (Paris, 1872);
  - WEILAND, Une Ame d'Apôtre, le Vénérable Jean Martin Moye (Metz, 1901);
  - PUY-PENY, Le Directoire des Soeurs de La Providence (Portieux);
  - René François Rohrbacher, Histoire Universelle de l'Église Catholique (Paris, 1842–48, 9th ed., 1901);
  - Lettres édifiantes (Paris).
