= Guiyang Christian Church =

Church in Guiyang, China

Guiyang Christian Church (simplified Chinese: 贵阳基督教堂; traditional Chinese: 貴陽基督教堂; pinyin: Guìyáng Jīdūjiàotáng), shortly Guiyang Church, formerly Guiyang Adventist Church, is by far the largest Christian church in Guiyang, the capital of Guizhou Province, China. It is also the Guizhou provincial office site of the China Christian Council. The church was founded in 1928 and currently has about 20,000 members.

== History ==
In 1877, two missionaries James Broumton (巴子成) and Charles Judd (祝名揚) of the China Inland Mission went to Guiyang to preach. They rented a house there and converted it into a chapel.

In 1927, American missionary Harry Willis Miller(施謀道) was sent to Guiyang to preach and to build a church by the West China Federation of Seventh-day Adventists. In 1928, he spent 3,000 yuan to buy a villa on Puding Street (now Qianling West Road) and converted it into a church, which was called the "Adventist Church" of Guiyang.

After the founding of the People's Republic of China in 1949, foreign missionaries were expelled from the country and the church joined the Three-Self Patriotic Movement.

During the Cultural Revolution from 1966 to 1976, the church was damaged and religious activities were suspended. Later, it was occupied by a street rubber factory. After the Cultural Revolution, the government restored the policy of religious freedom and returned the property to the church, but part of its area had been occupied by the surrounding units.

In 1984, the government allocated RMB 330,000 to support the reconstruction of the church on Qianling West Road. On Christmas Day in 1986, the new church was completed and put into use, and was officially renamed "Guiyang Christian Church".

== Current situation ==
In 2019, there were 17 churches in Guiyang City (including suburban districts and counties) with a total of about 30,000 believers. Among them, Guiyang Christian Church is by far the largest, with about 20,000 believers.

Guiyang Christian Church is open to the public. There are six services every week, with 800 to 1,000 people in each service, and due to lack of seats in the hall, some people have to sit at the gate. The church also has a "micro library" with more than 300 books in Chinese and English, which are available for free rental. Among them, books on spirituality, testimony, marriage and family are more popular. The librarian is a volunteer church member and does not earn a salary.

== Architecture ==
There is a large round-arched window above the church gate, leading to the top. On both sides, there are symmetrical pointed-arched windows for each of the four floors. Four golden lampstands are installed at the four corners of the roof, and a steeple is built in the center with a red cross on it. The main hall is of 730 square meters, with seats for more than 600 people.

== See also ==
Christianity in Guizhou
