= Augustine Hu Daguo =

- Bishop of Guiyang (Kweyang)
- Native name: 胡大国
- Church: Catholic Church
- Archdiocese: Archdiocese of Guiyang (Kweyang)
- In office: 1987 – 17 February 2011
- Predecessor: Jean Larrart
- Successor: Anicetus Andrew Wang Chong-yi

Orders
- Ordination: 29 June 1951
- Consecration: 1987 by Peter Joseph Fan Xueyan

Personal details
- Born: 15 May 1921 Tongzhou Town, Pingtang County, Kweichow, Republic of China
- Died: 17 February 2011 (aged 89) Guiyang, Guizhou, China

Augustine Hu Daguo (15 May 1921 – 17 February 2011) was the underground Roman Catholic bishop (as such, he was then considered a part of the Vatican-recognized hierarchy in China approved by and in communion with the Pope) of the Apostolic Prefecture of Shiqian, Shiqian (Shihtsien), Guizhou, China. The Apostolic Prefecture of Shiqian is a suffragan see in the province of the Archdiocese of Guiyang.

== Biography ==
Augustine Hu Daguo was born on 15 May 1921 to a family of long Christian tradition in Tongzhou, Pingtang, Guizhou. He was baptized when he was one month old. From the age of 7 to 11 he studied the Bible and regularly frequented the local Catholic church. In 1936 he entered the Minor Seminary of the Roman Catholic Archdiocese of Guiyang based in the capital city of Guizhou Province. He was ordained to the priesthood on 29 June 1951. After his presbyteral ordination, he taught in the Major Seminary, and in 1955 he was sent to work in the parish of Youtangkou as the pastoral vicar. On 4 April 1955 Hu was arrested, and then imprisoned for three years in the detention center of Guizhou Province. In 1958, he was sentenced to ten years of forced labor and re-education in three different factories of Guizhou Province. At the end of his sentence he was sent to semi-detention in a factory in Fuquan, China, in southern Guizhou Province. Later, he was sent to teach in the theological seminary of Chengdu, in the province of Sichuan. Four years later he was removed from his position, and returned to Guizhou Province, where he was appointed pastor of Duyun, Dushan, Fuquan, Tuanbo, and Wen'an. Hu was secretly ordained a bishop in 1987 by Bishop Peter Joseph Fan Xueyan, the bishop of the Roman Catholic Diocese of Baoding; the Vatican later approved the ordination. In 1999, at the age of almost 80, Bishop Hu sustained a leg injury from which he never really fully recovered.

== See also ==
- Christianity in Guizhou
- Catholic Church in Sichuan
