= Paul Emile Diou =

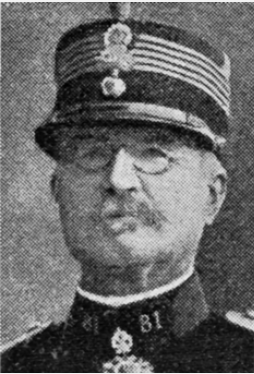
- Born: 6 September 1855; Saint-Julien-lès-Metz, Moselle
- Died: 23 August 1914 (aged 58); Dieuze
- Burial place: L'Esperence War Cemetery, Cutting, Moselle
- Military career
- Allegiance: France
- Branch: French Army
- Service years: 1873–1914
- Rank: Général de brigade
- Conflicts: Boxer Rebellion (1900–1901); Morocco Occupation (1907–1908); First World War (1914)
- Awards: Legion of Honour, Officer 1910; Commander of the Order of Glory (Tunisia); Colonial Medal; 1901 China expedition commemorative medal; Cited in the Order of the Day

Paul Emile Diou (6 September 1855 – 23 August 1914) was a French general. Diou entered the army in 1873 and spent much of his early career superintending the training of army personnel. He saw extended service in Tunisia with the Army of Africa and also in the Far East. Diou was praised for his work in Morocco in 1908 and was subsequently appointed to brigade command. In the opening stages of the First World War he led his brigade in an attack on German positions and was mortally wounded.

== Early life and career ==
Diou was born on 6 September 1855 at Saint-Julien-lès-Metz in Moselle where a plaque marks his birthplace. His parents were Joseph Diou, a lecturer in rhetoric who was later principal of Mirecourt College, and Marie Francoise Feultier Diou. Following the Franco-Prussian War of 1870–1 his home town was annexed by Germany. Following the terms set out by the Treaty of Frankfurt, Diou was one of the Alsatians and Lotharingians who chose to retain their French citizenship. Diou volunteered for a five year period of service with the French Army on 22 October 1873 and entered the Ecole Spéciale Militaire de Saint-Cyr two days later. He was commissioned as a sous lieutenant on 1 October 1875 with the 69th Infantry Regiment (Diou's graduating class was named for Archduke Albrecht, Duke of Teschen who had fought against France's enemy Prussia in the Austro-Prussian War). As a subaltern he was reportedly a "shy and timid character, but an energetic worker" and was commended by the Minister of War (Jean Auguste Berthaut) on 31 January 1877 for survey work undertaken in the vicinity of Toul. Later that year he won the army's regional shooting championship at the camp at Châlons-en-Champagne.

== Colonial Service ==
Diou was promoted to lieutenant in the 110th Infantry Regiment on 17 September 1880 and served in Tunisia from 11 September 1881 until 9 April 1883. There was a break in his service in that country between May and September 1882 and he may have returned to France to recover from Typhoid fever that he contracted in Tunisia. Diou was promoted to captain in the 45th Infantry Regiment on 29 December 1885 and held responsibility for preparing enlisted candidates for the non-commissioned officer examinations at the Ecole Militaire in Saint-Maixent. He wrote a dissertation on the development of defensive positions at Farbus in 1888 and returned to the Ecole Spéciale Militaire as a lecturer in musketry on 18 October 1890.

Diou left St-Cyr on 11 October 1894 when he rejoined the 69th Infantry Regiment, assuming responsibility for their musketry and training. In early 1895 he received command of a company before, on 29 December 1895, he was promoted to chef de bataillon in the 4th Regiment of the Algerian Tirailleurs with the Army of Africa. He served with them in Tunisia from 6 February 1896 and was appointed a chevalier of the Legion of Honour on 29 December. Transferred to command the 4th Battalion of the Light Infantry of Africa on 29 December 1897, Diou received praise for his service at Gabès which was acknowledged as a difficult posting. He remained in Tunisia until November 1900 and received the Colonial Medal for his service there.

Diou served in the French possession of Tonkin, Indo-China in 1900–1 and also apparently saw action in the Boxer Rebellion, receiving the 1901 China expedition commemorative medal. He returned to Tunisia on 21 October 1901, was appointed an officer of the Tunisian Order of Glory on 14 June 1903 and was promoted to lieutenant-colonel of the 121st Infantry Regiment on 31 December. Diou was appointed a commander of the Order of Glory on 3 May 1904. He transferred to the 2nd Regiment of Algerian Tirailleurs on 21 May 1906 and served in Algeria and the wider Sahara region until 29 August 1907. Diou was posted to Morocco on 30 August 1907, transferred to the 56th Infantry Regiment on 21 January 1908 and was promoted to colonel of the 81st Infantry Regiment on 23 February 1908. He was engaged in the action at Taddert on 11 July 1907 and at the affair at Sidi Bahin on 25 July 1907. Diou saw action in the landings at Casablanca in 1908 that led to the establishment of the French protectorate of Morocco and commanded the French column operating upon the Moroccan coast thereafter. He fought eight battles in Morocco in early 1908 and was mentioned in dispatches at the army level for actions against the enemy at Oued Aceila on 8 March 1908.

The French commander in Morocco, General Albert d'Amade, praised Diou's actions there stating that he "took part in almost all the engagements of the historic campaign in Casablanca and the outlying regions" and that he was sure to set an "example of calm and constancy of duty" in his new post. He left for France on 3 May 1908 and was appointed an officer of the Legion of Honour on 12 July 1910. Diou was appointed acting commander of the 63rd Infantry Brigade at Narbonne on 22 June 1912, receiving command of the 62nd Infantry Regiment two days later and of the 86th Infantry Regiment on 24 September. Diou's command of the brigade was confirmed on 21 December when he was appointed général de brigade. Diou was also appointed military commander of the Narbonne and Perpignan military subdivisions.

== First World War ==
Diou's brigade was mobilised as part of General Louis Émile Taverna's 16th Army Corps and saw action in the Battle of Lorraine in August 1914. The 143rd Infantry Regiment, part of Diou's brigade, were holding a defensive position in the Mulhewald Woods where they fought off German probing attacks on 19 August. Diou and Colonel Berguin, commander of the regiment, were commended for their coolness and courage under shellfire in this action. Diou's brigade was ordered to attack German positions at Bénestroff the next morning at 4 am in heavy fog. Before the attack could begin a German offensive launched from Cutting, Loudrefing and Mittersheim hit the regiment, supported by heavy artillery fire. The 143rd's 2nd battalion was able to hold off the attack long enough for the 1st and 3rd battalions to gain defensive positions before withdrawing to join them. Diou led a counterattack at 6 am that fared well initially, pushing the German troops back to a wooded area where, favoured by the terrain and the poor light, they were able to mount a strong defence. Several charges were made by the French troops but they were eventually forced to withdraw under heavy defensive fire. During this attack Diou, who led from the head of his troops with gun in hand, fell wounded in action. His brigade's second in command, Commandant Jacques, was later killed in action in the same engagement and the 143rd also lost Colonel Berguin and most of their medical staff. Diou died of his wounds on 23 August 1914 at Dieuze.

Diou is buried alongside 812 French soldiers in the centre of the L'Esperence War Cemetery at Cutting, Moselle. His grave lies next to the cemetery's memorial obelisk. His name is inscribed on the French generals' war memorial at the L'Hôtel des Invalides in Paris.
