= Agatha Lin =

Chinese Catholic Saint

Saint Agatha Lin
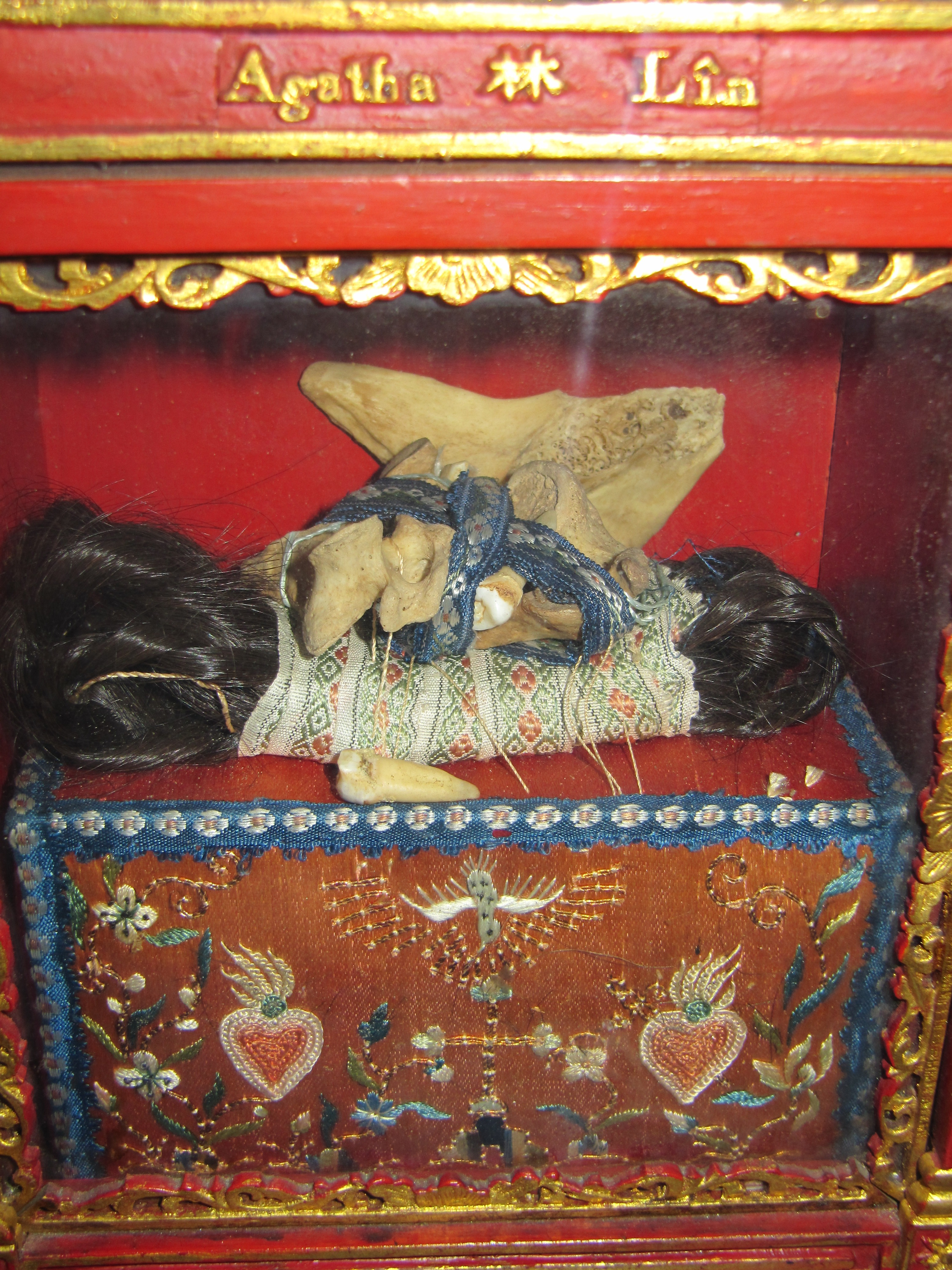
- Relics of St. Agatha Lin, House of Pauline Jaricot, Lyon.

Catechist and Martyr
- Born: 1817; Qinglong County, Guizhou, Qing Dynasty
- Died: 1858 (aged 40–41); Langdai County, Guizhou, Qing Dynasty
- Venerated in: Roman Catholic Church, Episcopal Church (United States)
- Beatified: May 2, 1909, Saint Peter's Basilica, Kingdom of Italy by Pope Pius X
- Canonized: October 1, 2000, Saint Peter's Square, Vatican City by Pope John Paul II
- Feast: February 18; February 19 Episcopal Church (United States)

Agatha Lin (林昭), born in Qinglong in the Guizhou province of southwest China in 1817, was a Chinese saint and martyr. She was a headmistress and catechist, and one of the first to evangelize the Miao people. She was beheaded for her faith on January 28, 1858. Agatha was beatified by Pope Pius X on May 2, 1909, and canonized in 2000. Her feast day is February 18.

== Early life ==
Agatha Lin, born Lin Zhao, was born in the village of Machang in the Qinglong district of Guizhou in 1817. Her father was a salt merchant, and both parents, who were "fervent Christians", had been converted to Christianity by Joseph Zhang Dapeng. Agatha was baptized when she was three days old, though her father was in prison at the time for refusing to renounce his Catholic faith. Her parents taught Agatha to read and write, and her mother trained her to become an expert in needlework. When she was young, Agatha took "a private vow of virginity". (Her patron was Agatha of Sicily, who was martyred in the 3rd century.) Her parents, however, had betrothed Agatha to a man while she was a child, according to custom, but they agreed to annul the marriage when she was 18 because she had consecrated her life to God. A priest, Matthew Liu, advised Agatha's father to send her to Guiyang, the capital of Guizhou Province, to study at the school for girls founded and run by the consecrated virgin Annie Yuan of Sichuan.

Two months later, the school was closed due to persecution, and Agatha went to Longping, near Zunyi, with the school's head teacher and studied there for two years. She returned home to discover that her father had been re-arrested, and she stayed to care for her aging mother.

== Religious work ==
Agatha made her vows when she was 25. After the death of her father, she and her mother moved to the district of Zhenning. There she converted people to Christianity. She moved to Guiyang to become the director of a house of formation for consecrated virgins under Bishop Etienne Albrand. Her father bequeathed her enough money that she was able to buy a house near Xinggi, which served as a chapel and school. Under the direction of the priest Paul Perny, she moved to Maokou, a Miao village in the Langdai district, to teach women. She was one of the first to evangelize the Miao people. After two years, her pupils were baptized.

== Death and canonization ==
In 1858 the village where Agatha was living was raided. She was arrested alongside another catechist, Jerome Lu Tingmei. Both were condemned to death, "after they had been denounced as Christians". They along with Laurence Wang Bing, a successful farmer, were beheaded on January 28, 1858. She was beatified by Pope Pius X in 1909, and was canonized in 2000. Her feast day is February 18.

Agatha Lin Zhao is honored (with Agnes Tsao Kou Ying and Lucy Yi Zhenmei) with a Lesser Feast on the liturgical calendar of the Episcopal Church in the United States of America on February 19.

== See also ==
- Christianity in Guizhou
- Martyr Saints of China
