= Joseph Zhang Dapeng =

Chinese martyr and saint

Saint Joseph Zhang Dapeng

Martyr
- Born: 1754; Duyun, Guizhou, Qing China
- Died: March 12, 1815; Duyun, Guizhou, Qing China
- Beatified: 12 February 1909 by Pope Pius X
- Canonized: 1 October 2000, Rome by Pope John Paul II
- Feast: 12 March

Joseph Zhang Dapeng (Chinese: 張大鵬, 1754 – 12 March 1815) was a Chinese martyr saint.

== Life ==
Zhang Dapeng was born in 1754 in Guizhou and was raised as a Buddhist. He was a silk-maker by trade and operated a business with a partner who was surnamed Wang. His partner's son, Wang Zheng, was sent to attend examinations in Beijing. While there, Wang Zheng encountered the Catholic Church in Beijing, converted, and was baptized. Wang Zheng then began trying to convert others to the faith, and when he returned home to Guizhou, he also tried to convert members of his family.

However, Zhang Dapeng did not want to convert. He had married a wife named Chen Shi (陳氏), but after many years, she had not provided him with a son. He had therefore had taken a concubine as a second wife to produce a child. His second wife gave birth to a son, Zhang Dewang (張德旺), who was born in 1793. Conversion to Christianity would have required him to keep only one wife. Because his first wife was seen to be the proper wife and the second wife had the status of a concubine, this would have meant that the mother of his only son had to leave him.

A Sichuanese priest named Mathias Lo (羅瑪弟) was serving as a missionary in nearby Sichuan at that time, and he sent a Sichuanese lay missionary named Lawrence Hu Shilu (胡世祿; French: Laurent Hou) to go to Guizhou to preach the faith and establish a mission.

Lawrence Hu met Zhang Dapeng and helped him to accept faith in Christ. Zhang Dapeng agreed to send his concubine away, and he paid a dowry for her to be married to a Catholic layman surnamed Du. Then he began attending religious instructions to join the Catholic Church. One of his fellow catechumens in the same class was the future Chinese martyr saint Peter Wu Guosheng.

Zhang Dapeng was baptized in the year 1800, at the age 46, by Father Mathias Lo. After baptism, he began to preach to others about the faith of the Catholic Church. Over the next fifteen years, he taught many people about Catholicism, and he even moved to live on a busy street so that he could share the faith with thers. He also served the poor, elderly people, and orphans, and he spent three years working as a headmaster and teacher at a Catholic school in Guiyang that had been established by a missionary.

Some of his relatives became angry over his attempts to share the faith, and they made false accusations against him to the government. They claimed that he was a member of the White Lotus Society, which had been conspiring against the government of the Qing dynasty.

Zhang Dapeng's wife and son eventually joined the faith and were also baptized. His son took the baptismal name of Anthony.

Because of Dapeng's preaching, Mandarins within the government wanted to imprison him, mainly because some Chinese disliked foreign religious beliefs. At the same time, a new wave of anti-Christian persecution was initiated by the Jiaqing emperor in the 1810s. Dapeng's son was arrested by the Mandarins and died in 1813.

When Zhang Dapeng heard of his son's death, he fled to Sichuan. His brother-in-law betrayed his location to the authorities for the sake of a monetary reward, and Zhang Dapeng was captured and was imprisoned in the year 1814. He was put into the same prison in which Peter Wu Guosheng and other Christians were imprisoned for their Christian faith. Prisoners were presented with a crucifix and told to trample on it as a sign of disrespect, but Zhang Dapeng refused to do so.

When Zhang Dapeng's nephew offered to pay him a large sum of money to renounce Christ, Zhang Dapeng still refused. He replied, "What use is silver to me? You can buy my body, but you can't buy my soul."

The officials judged that Zhang Dapeng was guilty of following an evil cult and working to spread it to others, which violated the law. He was therefore ordered to be executed. His relatives continued to try to convince him to give up his faith while there was still time, but he refused.

He was tied to a crucifix shaped like a capital letter T. Then his executioner tied a rope around his neck and strangled him to death. Zhang Dapeng died a martyr at the hands of the Mandarins at the age of 61 on 12 March 1815.

A great storm began after his death, which was interpreted as an omen by those present. Afterwards, Christians would visit his gravesite to collect plants for medicinal uses, and they believed these plants had special healing properties.

== Family life ==
Zhang Dapeng had two wives and a son named Dewang Dapeng. Zhang Dapeng also had two brothers named Dakui and Daxue.

== Canonization ==
Zhang Dapeng was beatified on 12 February 1909 by Pope Pius X and was canonized on 1 October 2000 by Pope John Paul II.

== Chapel ==
- Hong Kong St. Zhang Dapeng Chapel

== See also ==
- Chinese Martyrs
- Christianity in Guizhou
- Catholic Church in Sichuan
