= Wang Chongyi =

Wang Chongyi may refer to:

- Anicetus Andrew Wang Chong-yi (1919–2017, 王充一; Wáng Chōngyī), Chinese Roman Catholic bishop
- Wang Chung-yi (born 1952, 王崇儀; Wáng Chóngyí), Taiwanese politician
