= Apostolic Prefecture of Shiqian =

Jurisdiction of the Catholic Church in China

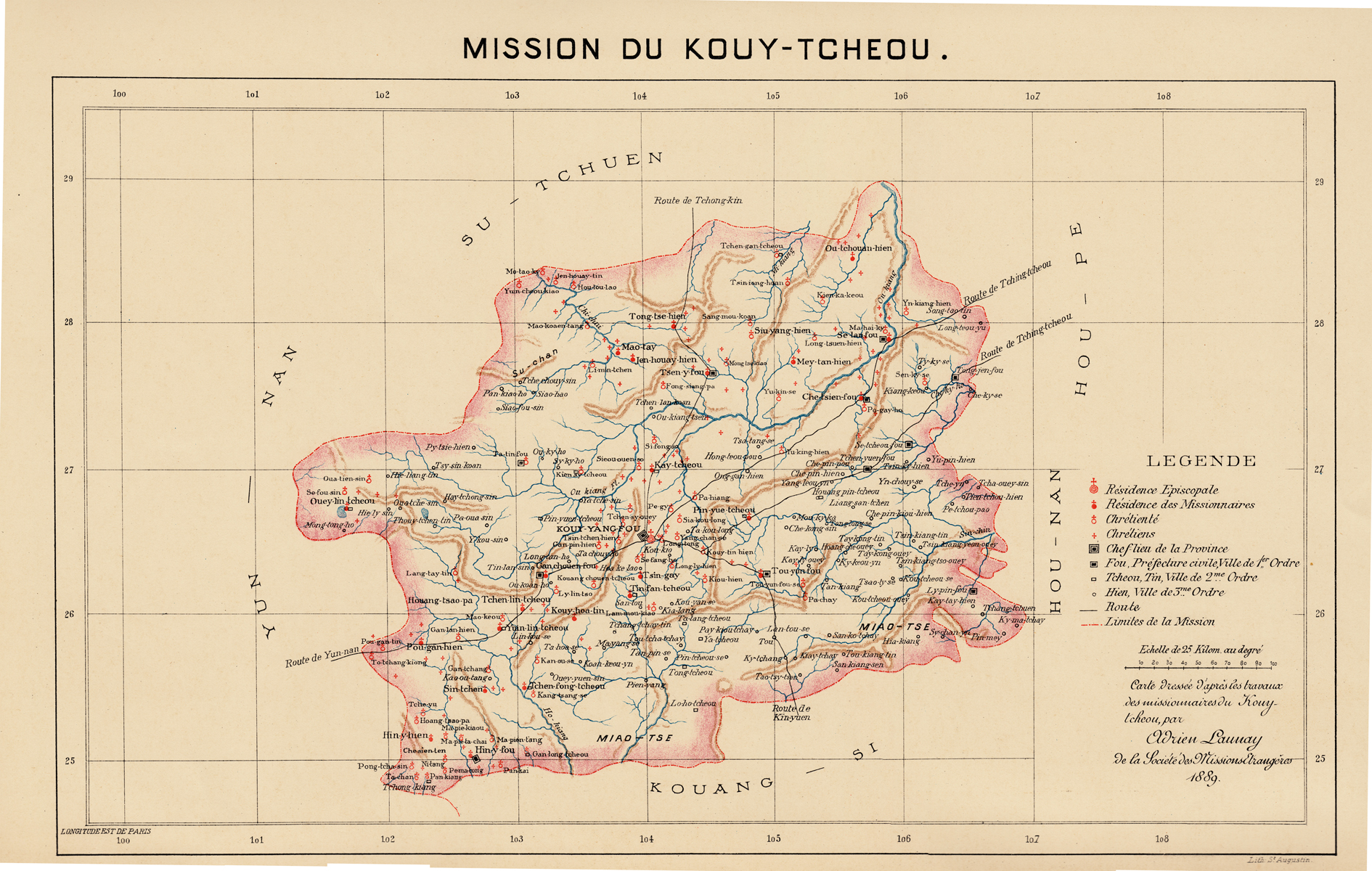
Map of the Kweichow Mission, prepared by Adrien Launay, 1889.

The Apostolic Prefecture of Shiqian is a Latin pre-diocesan missionary jurisdiction of the Catholic Church in Shiqian County, Guizhou, southwestern China. The county is under the administration of the city of Tongren (Tong-jen-fou).

It is exempt, i.e. directly subject to the Holy See and its Roman Congregation for the Evangelization of Peoples, not part of any Ecclesiastical province. No cathedral or statistics available.

It is vacant since 2011, without Apostolic administrator.

== History ==
- Established on 1932.03.23 as Mission sui juris of Shiqian 石阡 (中文) (Shihtsien) / Shihtsienen(sis) (Latin), on territory split off from the then Apostolic Vicariate of Guiyang (貴陽, now a Metropolitan Archdiocese)
- Promoted on 1937.12.02 as Apostolic Prefecture of Shiqian 石阡 (中文) (Shihtsien) / Shihtsienen(sis) (Latin).

== Ordinaries ==
(all Roman Rite)

Ecclesiastical Superior of Shiqian (Shihtsien) 石阡

- Father Luigi Baumeister (包美德), Sacred Heart Missionaries (M.S.C.) (born in Germany) (1932.11.11 – retired 1937.12.02), died 1946

Apostolic Prefects of Shiqian (Shihtsien) 石阡

- Father Matthias Buchholz (步堅牧), M.S.C. (born in Germany) (1937.12.10 – retired 1983), died 1991
- Augustine Hu Da-guo (胡大國) (1997 – death 2011.02.17), previously Metropolitan Archbishop of Guiyang 貴陽 (born in Guizhou) (1987–1997)
- vacancy.

== Sources and external links ==
- GCathholic, with Google map - data for all sections
