= St. Agnes Kouying Tsao Catholic Church =

Catholic Church in Markham, Ontario

St. Agnes Kouying Tsao Catholic Church 天主教聖曹桂英堂
- St. Agnes Kouying Tsao Catholic Church 天主教聖曹桂英堂
- 43.8704°N 79.3534°W
- Location: 2130 Rodick Road, Markham, Ontario
- Country: Canada
- Denomination: Roman Catholic

History
- Former name: Blessed Agnes Kouying Tsao Catholic Mission
- Status: Parish church
- Founded: 1992 (First Mass); 2000 (Building completed)
- Founder: Fr. Nicola Ruggiero
- Dedication: St. Agnes Kouying Tsao
- Dedicated: 1992

Architecture
- Functional status: Active
- Architect: David Sin
- Architectural type: Modern
- Groundbreaking: August 24, 2000
- Completed: April 2001
- Construction cost: $3.5 million Canadian dollars

Specifications
- Capacity: approx. 600

Administration
- Archdiocese: Toronto
- Parish: St. Agnes Kouying Tsao Parish

Clergy
- Pastor(s): Fr. Francis Chong, CDD Fr. Matthew Wang CDD, Fr. John Wang CDD

St. Agnes Kouying Tsao Catholic Church (Chinese: 天主教聖曹桂英堂), formerly known as Blessed Agnes Kouying Tsao Catholic Mission, was founded in 1992 by Rev. Fr. Nicola Ruggiero, an Italian missionary preaching in Hong Kong. St. Agnes was built in response to the growing religious demands of Chinese Christian immigrants flooding into the Markham area from places like Hong Kong and mainland China. On October 1, 2000, Pope John Paul II canonized St. Agnes Kouying Tsao and the parish was then renamed Saint Agnes Kouying Tsao Catholic Church.

== History ==
The St. Agnes Kouying Tsao Catholic Church first began in 1992, when Fr. Nicola Ruggiero accepted the mission of looking after the Chinese Catholic Community in Toronto. In June 1992 Fr. Ruggiero successfully filed an application to the Archdiocese of Toronto for establishing a Catholic mission in the area and two days later, the Decree of Establishment was granted. The mission celebrated their first Mass on December 6, 1992, at Christ the King Catholic Elementary School. In June 1993, Fr. Ruggiero filed another application to the Archdiocese of Toronto, this time for a site to build a new church. On November 3, 1993, a permit was granted to set aside a 2-acre (8,100 m^{2}) site at the current location. Fr. Ruggiero immediately started the fund-raising campaign and appointed architect Mr. David Sin to design the new church in August 1997. Unfortunately, in late 1998, Fr. Ruggiero's health failed and forced him to retire early to Italy.

In November 1998, Fr. Dominic Kong was transferred from Hong Kong as the new pastor, immediately continuing the fundraising campaign. In September 1999, the church construction plan was approved by the local authorities and the parish Church Building Committee was formed at the request of Fr. Kong. The church site was blessed by Bishop Robert Clune on July 31, 2000. Almost 400 people attended the blessing. The actual construction contract consisted of two phases since funds for the whole project could not be raised in time when tenders were called. The first phase began on August 24, 2000, including the main church, activity hall, classrooms and the pastor quarter and ended in August 2001. The second phase, which included the office, internal fixtures and decors, began in December 2001 and ended in April 2002.

Fr. Kong celebrated the church's first Mass on December 22, 2001.

== Architecture ==
The architecture of St. Agnes is unique and unusual for Chinese Catholic churches. One such feature is that the main altar windows are partially concealed until one approaches the altar. For one to see them, one must gaze upward as you approach the altar.

As more of the windows are revealed, one begins to see "The Angelic Ladder", which is symbolic of the spiritual journey to a new land (heaven). But perhaps what sets this church from the others is that not only does this have religious meaning, but also real meaning. This is because on one of the stained-glass windows, there is a depiction of an actual ladder and embracing this ladder are two branches. One of these branches has maple leaves and the other bamboo leaves, symbolizing the unity of Chinese and Canadian cultures.

== See also ==
Other Chinese Catholic churches in the Greater Toronto Area

- Chinese Martyrs Catholic Church
