= Agnes Tsao Kou Ying =

Qing dynasty Chinese layperson

Saint Agnes Tsao Kou Ying (Chinese: 曹桂英)

Catechist and Martyr
- Born: April 28, 1821; Wujiazhai, Guizhou, Qing China (present-day in Xingyi, Qianxinan Bouyei and Miao Autonomous Prefecture, Guizhou, China)
- Died: March 1, 1856 (aged 34); Yaoshan, Guangxi, Qing China (present-day near Guilin, Guangxi, China)
- Venerated in: Catholic Church; Episcopal Church (United States)
- Beatified: May 27, 1900 by Pope Leo XIII
- Canonized: October 1, 2000 by Pope John Paul II
- Major shrine: St. Agnes Kouying Tsao Catholic Church (in Markham, Ontario)
- Feast: March 1 February 19 Episcopal Church (United States)

Agnes Tsao Kou Ying
- Chinese: 曹桂英
Transcriptions
Standard Mandarin
- Hanyu Pinyin: Cáo Guìyīng
- Wade–Giles: Ts'ao^{2} Kuei^{4}-ying^{1}
Yue: Cantonese
- Jyutping: cou4 gwai3 jing1

Agnes Tsao Kou Ying (28 April 1821 – 1 March 1856; also Agnes Kouying Tsao), or Cao Guiying (Chinese: 曹桂英), was a Qing dynasty Chinese layperson who was martyred for preaching the Gospel in Guangxi. She was canonized a martyr-saint by Pope John Paul II on 1 October 2000.

== Early life ==
Tsao was born in the small village of Wujiazhai in Guizhou province on April 28, 1821. Her family was a traditional Catholic family originally from Sichuan province. She later left her hometown to work in the city of Xingyi after her parents died. There she met a Catholic woman who let her live with her. Soon, Bishop Bai came to visit Xingyi and found out that she was without family so he took her to the local parish to learn more about Christianity. The bishop found her to be clever and a quick learner.

When Tsao turned eighteen, she married a local farmer, but her brother- and sister-in-law treated her as an outsider (for she was Christian) and did not consider her a part of the family. Therefore, Tsao was left with little to eat. Things became worse for Tsao when her husband died after two years and she was driven out of the house. In order to support herself, she took odd jobs as a helper. Then a pious Catholic widow invited Tsao to stay with her. She also had a good understanding of the scriptures and the teachings of the Catholic Church. Whenever a priest visited them this widow received the Sacrament of Reconciliation and the Eucharist. With such an example before her, Tsao was able to cultivate her own spirituality.

== Missionary work ==
One day, when the priest Auguste Chapdelaine was in town, he discovered how well Tsao knew the faith and asked her to move to Guangxi Province for some missionary work, especially for teaching the Catholic faith to some 30-40 Catholic families living there (Catholics were very few in those days). In 1852, she went out to the town of Baijiazhai in Xilin County and made it her preaching headquarters, teaching the Catholic faith throughout Guangxi. She also taught cooking and household management, and in her spare time helped babysit.

== Arrest and death ==
In 1856, when she was helping out in Yaoshan, Guangxi (near present-day Guilin), the local government decided to take some measures against the Christians living in that area. Tsao was taken into custody along with many other Catholics who were soon released; only Tsao and Chapdelaine had to stay in prison. Chapdelaine later died from immense torture. The county magistrate tried to persuade Tsao to deny her faith under the promise that if she did, she would be released. However, Tsao was unmoved. Then the magistrate threatened torture, but she showed no fear. Finally, on the 22nd day of the first month (Chinese calendar date), the magistrate decided on her punishment. He had her locked in a cage so small that she could only stand up. She prayed repeatedly, "God, have mercy on me; Jesus save me!" She died three days later on March 1, 1856 (Gregorian calendar date).

== Beatification and canonization ==
Pope Leo XIII proclaimed her "Blessed" on 27 May 1900, and Pope John Paul II canonized her as a Martyr-Saint on 1 October 2000.

Agnes Tsao Kou Ying is honored (with Agatha Lin Zhao and Lucy Yi Zhenmei) with a Lesser Feast on the liturgical calendar of the Episcopal Church in the United States of America on February 19.

== Notes ==
There is a Chinese Catholic church in Markham, Ontario, named after her. As of 2015, she was one of the few canonized Chinese Catholic martyrs.

== See also ==
- Christianity in Guizhou
- Catholic Church in Sichuan
