= Chinese Martyrs Catholic Church =

Coordinates: 43.84165°N 79.26872°W

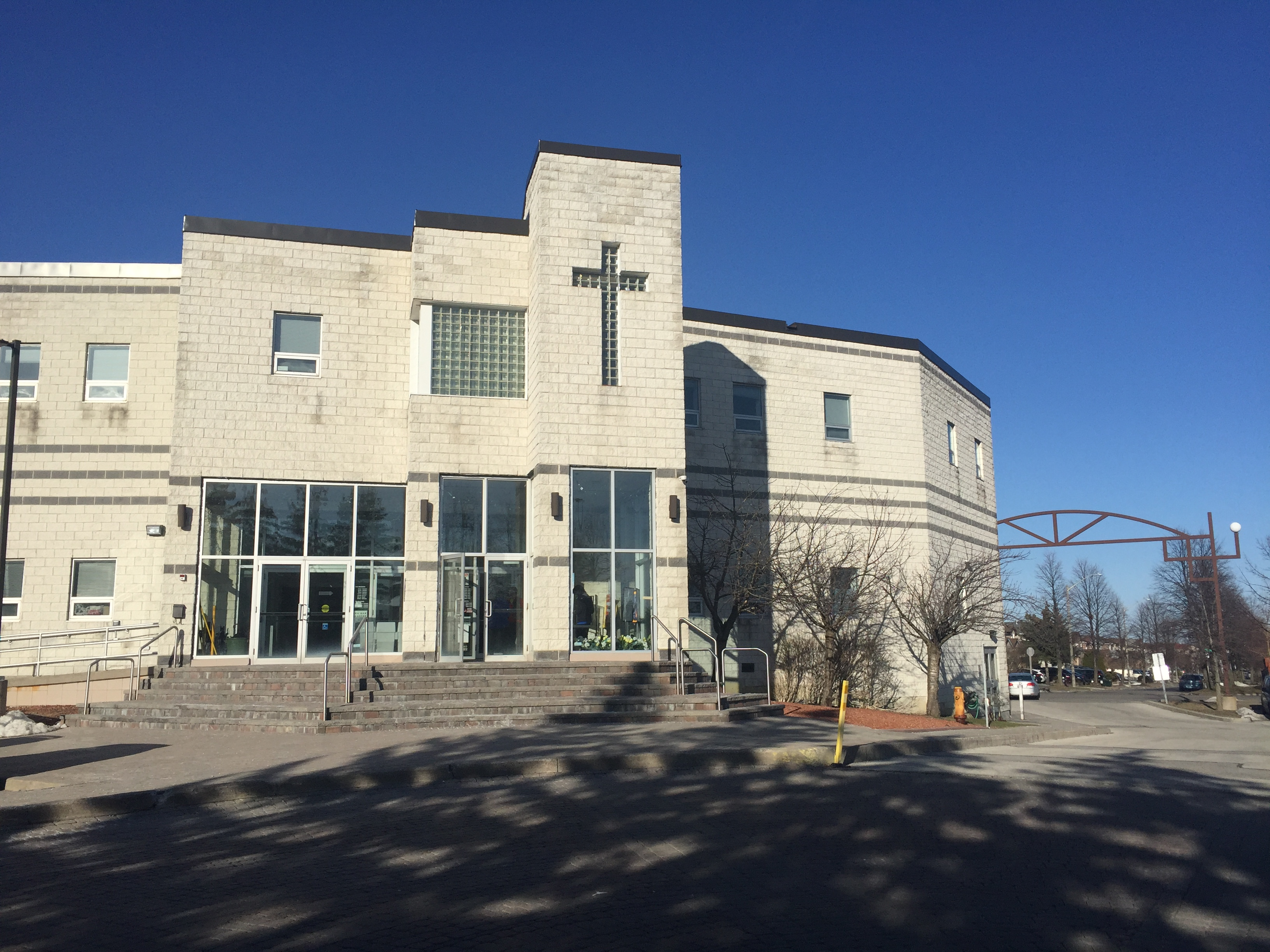
- Chinese Martyrs Catholic Church
- Location: Markham, Ontario
- Country: Canada
- Denomination: Roman Catholic
- Website: https://www.chinesemartyrs.org/ Official website of the Chinese Martyrs Catholic Church

Administration
- Province: Canada
- Diocese: Roman Catholic Diocese of Ontario
- Parish: Ontario

The Chinese Martyrs Catholic Church is a national Catholic church in the Greater Toronto Area for Chinese Catholics. Originally based in Scarborough and now based in Markham, it was the second Catholic church to cater to Chinese Catholics in the GTA. The church is named for the Chinese Martyrs, 120 Chinese and foreign missionaries and laypeople who died in China during the 19th and 20th centuries.

== See also ==
- St. Michael's Cathedral, Toronto
- St. Paul's Basilica
- St. Patrick's Church (Toronto)
- Our Lady of Lourdes Roman Catholic Church (Toronto)

Other Chinese Catholic churches in the Greater Toronto Area

- St. Agnes Kouying Tsao Catholic Church
- Our Lady of Mount Carmel Chinese Catholic Church
- Saviour of the World Chinese Catholic Church
