= Qiao'ergou Catholic Church =

Former Catholic church in Yan'an, Shaanxi

- 桥儿沟天主堂
- Qiao'ergou Catholic Church
- 36.6218°N 109.5204°E
- Location: Qiaogou Subdistrict, Baota District, Yan'an, Shaanxi
- Country: China
- Denomination: Catholic (until 1935)

Architecture
- Style: Romanesque Revival
- Completed: 1934
- Closed: 1935 (abandoned)

Administration
- Archdiocese: Yan'an (until 1935)

Qiao'ergou Catholic Church is a former Catholic church in Qiaogou Subdistrict, Baota District, Yan'an, Shaanxi. After the arrival of the Chinese Communist forces in Yan'an in 1936, it was used by the Central Party School of the Chinese Communist Party and the Lu Xun Art Institute. It was listed as a major cultural heritage site under national-level protection of China in 1961.

== History ==
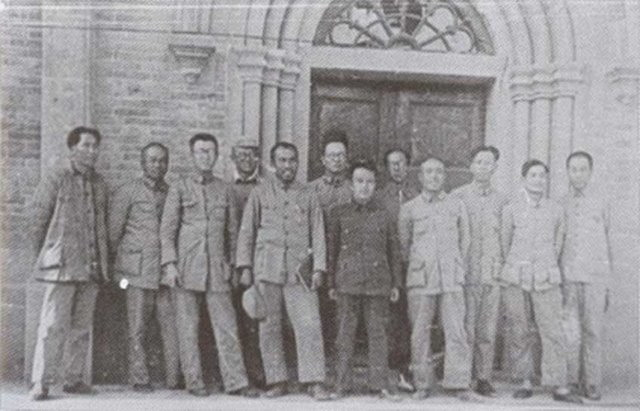
Delegates of the 6th plenary session of the 6th Central Committee of the Chinese Communist Party, including Mao Zedong (left end) and Zhou Enlai (right end), posing outside the church in 1938. The Romanesque Revival arch doorway is visible.

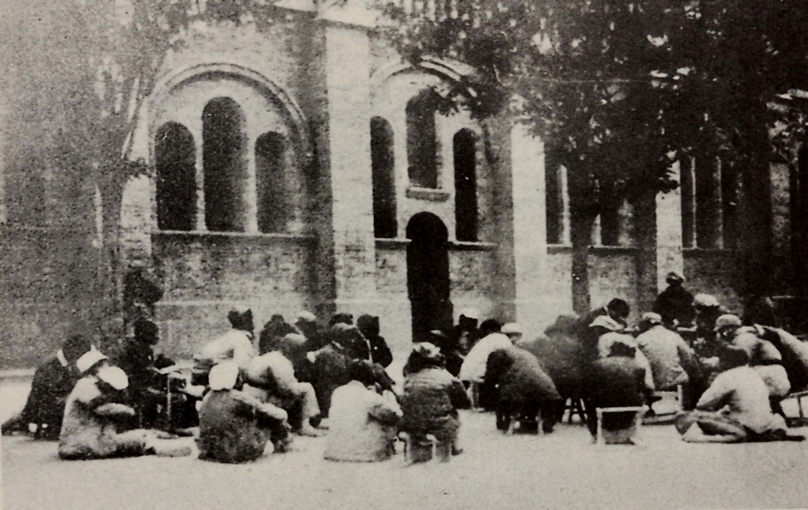
Students of Lu Xun Art Institute gather outside the church, which was used by the institute from 1939 to 1945.

In 1924, the Spanish Catholic missionary Celestino Ibáñez y Aparicio purchased land to build a church. The construction began in 1931 and was completed in 1934. Due to the arrival of the Chinese Red Army in northern Shaanxi (Shaanbei) in 1935, the Catholic Church retreated from the region and left the church and the associated buildings.

After the Long March, the Chinese Communist Party leadership arrived in Yan'an in January 1936. The Central Party School of the CCP used the church as its auditorium. In 1938, the sixth plenary session of the 6th Central Committee of the Chinese Communist Party happened at the church. From 1939 to 1945, Lu Xun Art Institute used the church building. It was a cultural center of Yan'an, then headquarter of the communist. In an essay written while visiting Yan'an, Mao Dun described the transformed church as "a symbol of new power in China".

In 1944, local Catholics celebrated Christmas at the church, and the Communist government sent a delegate to congratulate them.

After the founding of the People's Republic of China in 1949, the church has been listed as a site protected on the provincial level. In 1961, it was listed as one of the major cultural heritage sites under national-level protection.

== Architecture ==
The Romanesque Revival church is in basilica form. It is 36.28 m (119.0 ft) long and 15.858 m (52.03 ft) wide. The front façade is 11.04 m (36.2 ft) tall. The church has two bell towers that are 22.69 m (74.4 ft) tall.

The church faces south, with its altar placed at the north side of the church. The nave of the church is supported by 12 Corinthian pillars. Each pillar is 4.5 m (15 ft) tall. The nave is 7.2 m (24 ft) wide, while each of the aisles is 3.4 m (11 ft) wide. The altar and pillar capitals are decorated with traditional Chinese patterns. The choir loft is above the southern entrance.

== See also ==
- Yangliujie Catholic Church, Zunyi, another former Catholic Church used by the Chinese Communist Party in the 1930s.
- St. Francis Cathedral, Xi'an, also in Shaanxi
- Catholic Church in Shaanxi
