= Paul Liu Hanzuo =

Sichuanese Catholic saint

Saint Paul Liu Hanzuo 保祿·劉翰佐 M.E.P.

Martyr
- Born: 1778; Lezhi County, Sichuan, Qing China
- Died: 13 February 1818 (aged 39–40); Chengdu, Sichuan, Qing China
- Venerated in: Catholic Church
- Beatified: 27 May 1900, Saint Peter's Square, Vatican City by Pope Leo XIII
- Canonized: 1 October 2000, Saint Peter's Square, Vatican City by Pope John Paul II
- Feast: 13 February

Paul Liu Hanzuo was a Sichuanese Catholic priest of the Paris Foreign Missions Society. He was martyred in 1818 by the Chinese government for being a Christian. He is venerated as a martyr saint in the Catholic Church.

== Early life and priesthood ==
Liu was born in year 1778 in Lezhi County, Sichuan, Qing dynasty. He belonged to a fervent Catholic family. Because of scarcity of the financial support he couldn't get proper initial schooling but joined the seminary at the age of 24. He was allowed to study philosophy and theology in Chinese because he didn't know Latin. He was ordained a priest for the congregation of Paris Foreign Missions Society in his 30s. He was assigned missionary work in the Apostolic Vicariate of Szechwan, now known as the Diocese of Chengdu.

== Martyrdom ==
As Christians were persecuted at that time in China so he used to work as a vegetable vendor in the daytime and used to offer mass for the Christians at night. A local carpenter informed the authorities about Liu and his faith, so the authorities arrested him while he was offering mass on 15 August 1817. Authorities asked him to renounce his faith or pay a heavy bribe to get released from the jail but he didn't have that much money to pay and refused to renounce his faith. He was ordered to be executed. As per the order of the court he was strangled to death on 13 February 1818 at the Square of Execution at the East Gate of Chengdu, capital of the Sichuan province.

== Canonization ==
Liu was venerated as a martyr on 2 July 1899 by Pope Leo XIII and beatified on 27 May 1900 by Pope Leo XIII. He was canonized on 1 October 2000 by Pope John Paul II.

== See also ==
- Catholic Church in Sichuan
- Lucy Yi Zhenmei – Sichuanese martyr saint
