= Crescitelli =

Crescitelli is an Italian surname. Notable people with the surname include:

- Alberic Crescitelli (1863–1900), Italian Roman Catholic priest and missionary
- Tony Crescitelli (born 1957), Italian-American footballer
- Anthony Crescitelli (1930–1990), Brooklynite, tried out at Ebbett's Field for the Brooklyn Dodgers, 1950s
