= St. Joseph's Cathedral, Guiyang =

Catholic cathedral in China

- Guiyang North Church
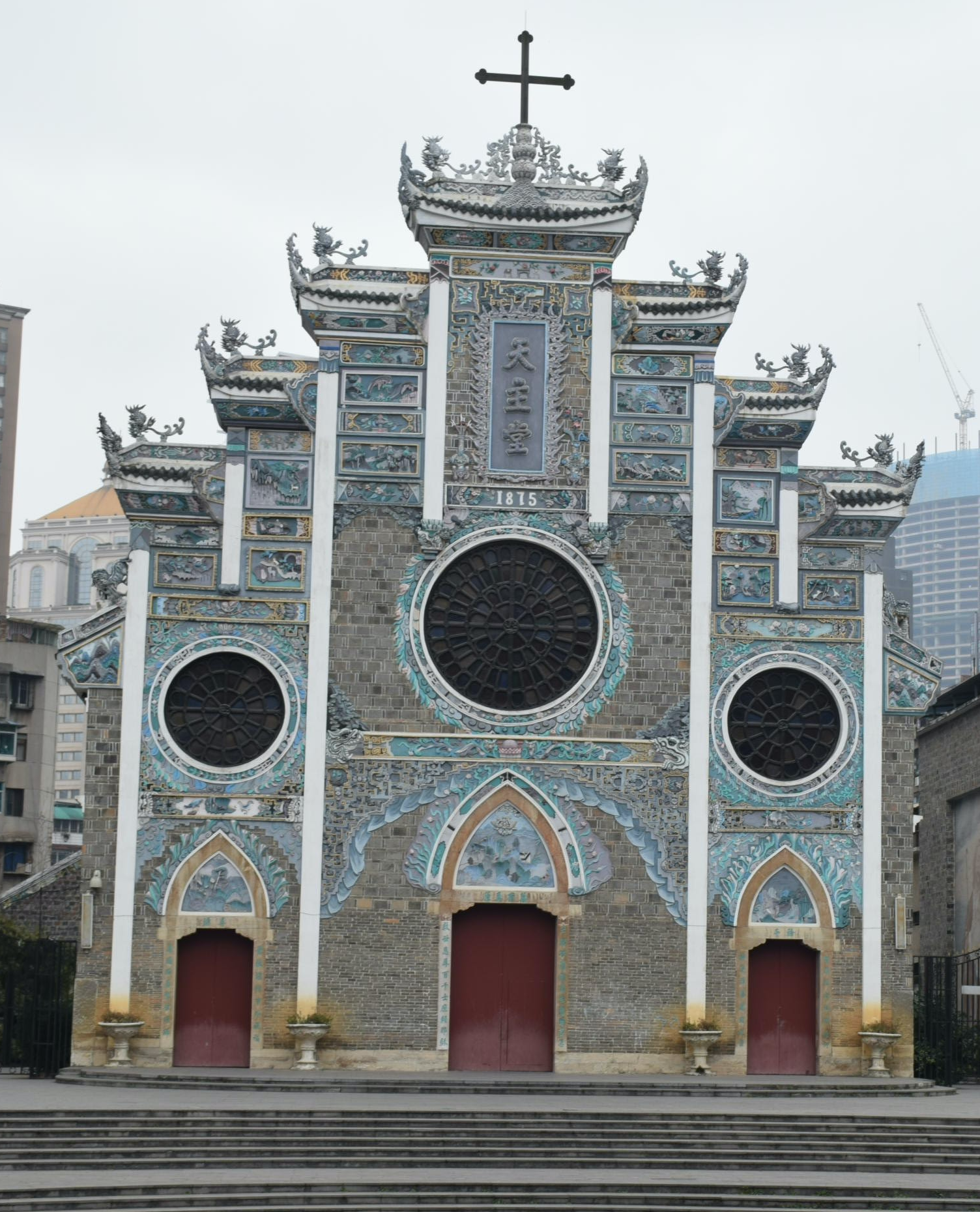
- Façade of the cathedral
- St. Joseph's Cathedral, Guiyang
- Location: 116 Shaanxi Road, Yunyan District, Guiyang, Guizhou
- Country: China
- Denomination: Catholic Church

History
- Status: Cathedral
- Founded: 1798
- Founder: Lawrence Hu Shilu
- Dedication: Saint Joseph

Architecture
- Functional status: Active
- Style: Guizhouese
- Groundbreaking: 1874
- Completed: 1876

Administration
- Archdiocese: Guiyang

Clergy
- Archbishop: Paul Xiao Zejiang

St. Joseph's Cathedral (simplified Chinese: 圣若瑟主教座堂; traditional Chinese: 聖若瑟主教座堂) also known as Guiyang North Church (贵阳北天主堂; 貴陽北天主堂) is a Catholic cathedral located in Guiyang, Guizhou, China, and it serves as the cathedral church for the Archdiocese of Guiyang.

== History ==
In 1696, the Holy See established the Apostolic Vicariate of Guizhou out of territory that formerly belonged to the Apostolic Vicariate of Fujian. Italian Jesuit missionary Carlo Giovanni Turcotti was appointed as its bishop, however, he never entered Guiyang. He sent three French missionaries to evangelize in Guiyang. In 1708, he was succeeded by French Jesuit Claude de Visdelou as bishop. However, Visdelou was not able to enter Guizhou due to prohibitions against foreign missionaries created by the Kangxi Emperor. The neighbouring Apostolic Vicariate of Sichuan sent missionaries into Guizhou to evangelize. Upon Visdelou's death in 1737, the territory of the Apostolic Vicariate of Guizhou was merged into the Apostolic Vicariate of Sichuan.

Guizhou continued to be evangelized by missionaries from Sichuan during the 18th and 19th centuries. In 1798, a small church was created by Lawrence Hu Shï-lu (胡世祿), a Sichuanese priest, for the Catholic community of about 100 people, however, this was later destroyed during the persecution under the Jiaqing Emperor in 1811.

In 1846, the Holy See established the Apostolic Vicariate of Guiyang out of the Apostolic Vicariate of Sichuan. French missionary Étienne-Raymond Albrand was appointed as its bishop. Albrand invoked the 1844 Treaty of Whampoa to demand that local authorities return the land of the former church. In 1850 a new church was built on this land and used as the seat of the bishop for the Vicariate. In 1874, the current structure of the cathedral was erected under the supervision of François-Eugène Lions, Apostolic Vicar of Guizhou. It was destroyed by a fire in 1875 and rebuilt in 1876.

In 1946, the Apostolic Vicariate was transformed into the Archdiocese of Guiyang and St. Joseph's Cathedral served as its cathedral church.

In 1966, most religious sites in China were closed as a result of the Cultural Revolution, including the cathedral. In the following decades the structure suffered damage and fell into bad condition. In 2004, the cathedral was renovated and re-opened for mass two years later.

== See also ==
- Christianity in Guizhou
- Catholic Church in Sichuan
