= Lucy Yi Zhenmei =

Chinese Catholic saint (1815–1862)

Saint Lucy Yi Zhenmei 易貞美
- An imaginary depiction of Lucy Yi

Virgin; Catechist and Martyr
- Born: December 9, 1815; Sichuan, Qing China
- Died: February 19, 1862 (aged 46); Guizhou, Qing China
- Venerated in: Catholic Church; American Episcopal Church
- Beatified: May 2, 1909, Vatican City, Rome by Pope Pius X
- Canonized: October 1, 2000, Vatican City, Rome by Pope John Paul II
- Feast: February 19

Lucy Yi Zhenmei (Note: traditional Chinese: 易貞美; simplified Chinese: 易贞美; pinyin: Yì Zhēnměi; Wade–Giles: I Chên-mei; Sichuanese romanization: I Chen-me.) (December 9, 1815 – February 19, 1862) was a Sichuanese Catholic saint from Mianyang, Sichuan Province, China. She is the lone woman of the five Guizhou Martyrs, a subset of the much larger Martyr Saints of China. She is referred to as Bienheureuse Lucie Y ('Blessed Lucy Yi') in old French sources.

== Life and work ==
Born on December 9, 1815, she was the youngest member of her family. Lucy was a very pious child, to the extent that she made a commitment to chastity at the age of 12.

As she matured, she developed a love for reading and study. At the age of 20, in the midst of her higher education she grew very ill. After her recovery, Lucy took her spiritual life even more seriously. She devoted herself to the discipline of prayer with great devotion, assuming a way of life much like that of an ascetic while continuing to assist in the support of her family. Her mother taught her how to spin, which also became part of her daily life.

After her father died, she lived with her brother and mother, using part of her leisure time to catechise children nearby. The parish priest, who asked her to teach at the school in Mianyang, noticed her devotion and reliable knowledge of her faith. After four years, her brother went to Chongqing to practice medicine, and Lucy and her mother joined him. In Chongqing, the local priest also asked her to help teach the women in their parish. When offered money for her work, she refused to take it and offered her work to God.

A few years later, her brother moved to Guiyang, during which time her mother died. Full of enthusiasm for spreading the Good News, she went on doing missionary work. However, for her own safety she decided to stay in a convent of lay virgins. Shortly after, her failing health forced her to move back home again. In 1861, Bishop Hu asked her to teach once more at the convent. In spite of opposition from relatives, she returned to work there.

== Martyrdom ==
In 1862, she went with Jean-Pierre Néel, a missionary priest of Paris Foreign Missions Society, to start a mission in Jiashanlong, but just then the administrator of Guizhou Province, Tian Xingshu, began to stir up hatred against Christians, with the support of the local magistrate. As a result, John Zhang Tianshen, Martin Wu Xuesheng, John Chen Xianheng and Néel were all imprisoned and sentenced to death without a formal trial.

On February 18, the day of their execution, they encountered Yi Zhenmei on the road. She was also jailed and put on trial that very day and sentenced to death, because she refused to renounce her faith. The following day at noon, February 19, 1862, she was beheaded. Brave believers took the bodies of all five martyrs to Liuchonnguan Seminary grounds for burial.

== Veneration ==
On May 2, 1909, Pope Pius X declared Yi and the other four martyrs blessed. Pope John Paul II canonized Lucy Yi Zhenmei and her companions, the Martyr Saints of China, on October 1, 2000. Her feast day is celebrated on February 19 according to the General Roman Calendar.

Lucy Yi Zhenmei is honored (with Agatha Lin Zhao and Agnes Tsao Kou Ying) with a Lesser Feast on the liturgical calendar of the Episcopal Church in the United States of America on February 19.

== See also ==
- Catholic Church in Mianyang
- Catholic Church in Sichuan
- Christianity in Guizhou
- Our Lady of Lourdes Church, Mianyang
- An Account of the Entry of the Catholic Religion into Sichuan
- Paul Liu Hanzuo – Sichuanese martyr saint
