= Rudolf Alfred Bosshardt =

British/Swiss missionary

Alfred Bosshardt
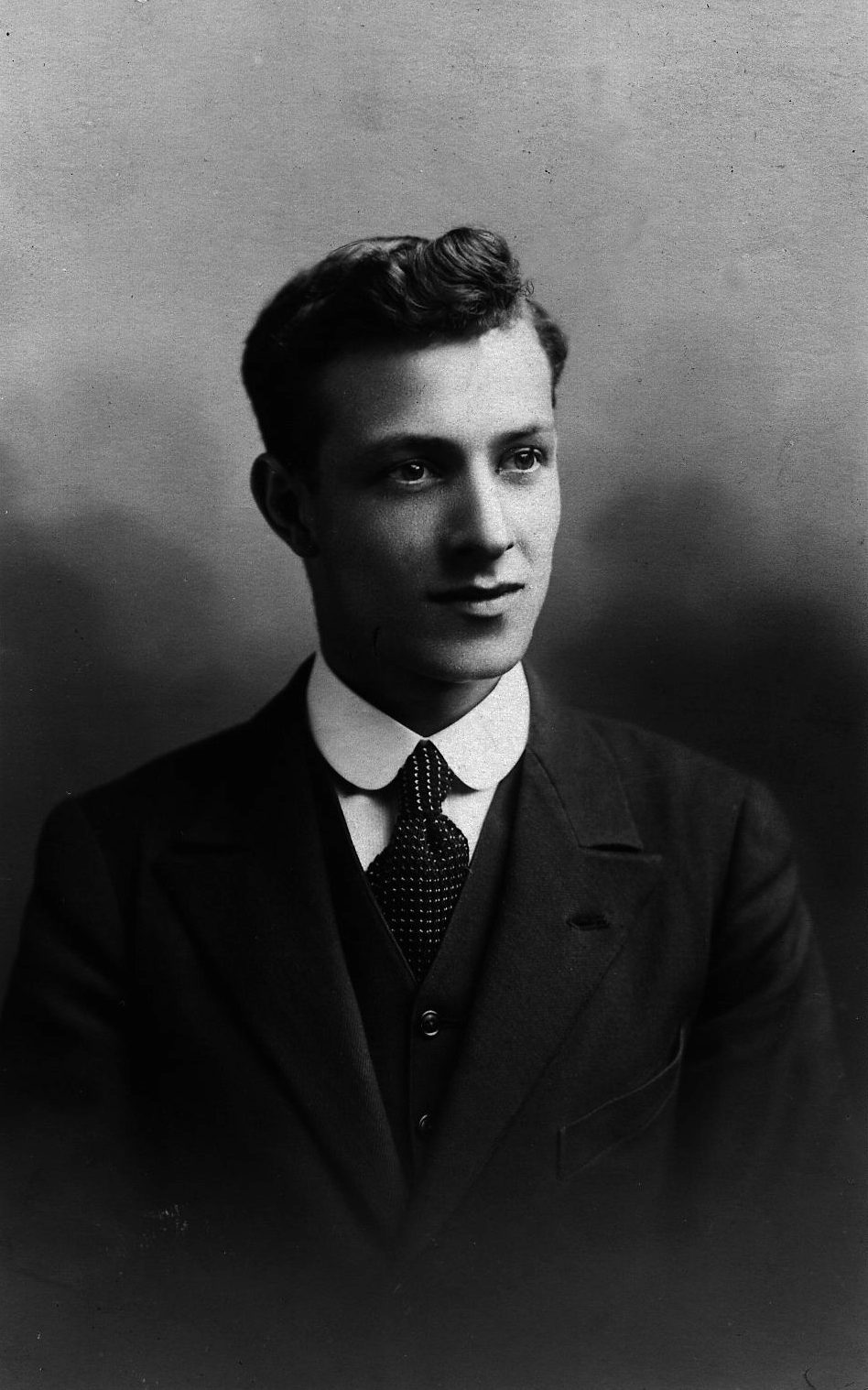
- Missionary to China
- Born: 1 January 1897; Manchester, England
- Died: 6 November 1993 (aged 96); Pembury, Kent, England
- Spouse: Rose Piaget

Rudolf Alfred Bosshardt (1 January 1897 – 6 November 1993) was a British-Swiss Protestant Christian missionary in Guizhou, China. He served with the China Inland Mission (CIM). He was one of two Europeans who were compelled to accompany the soldiers of the Red Army on the Long March.

== Life ==
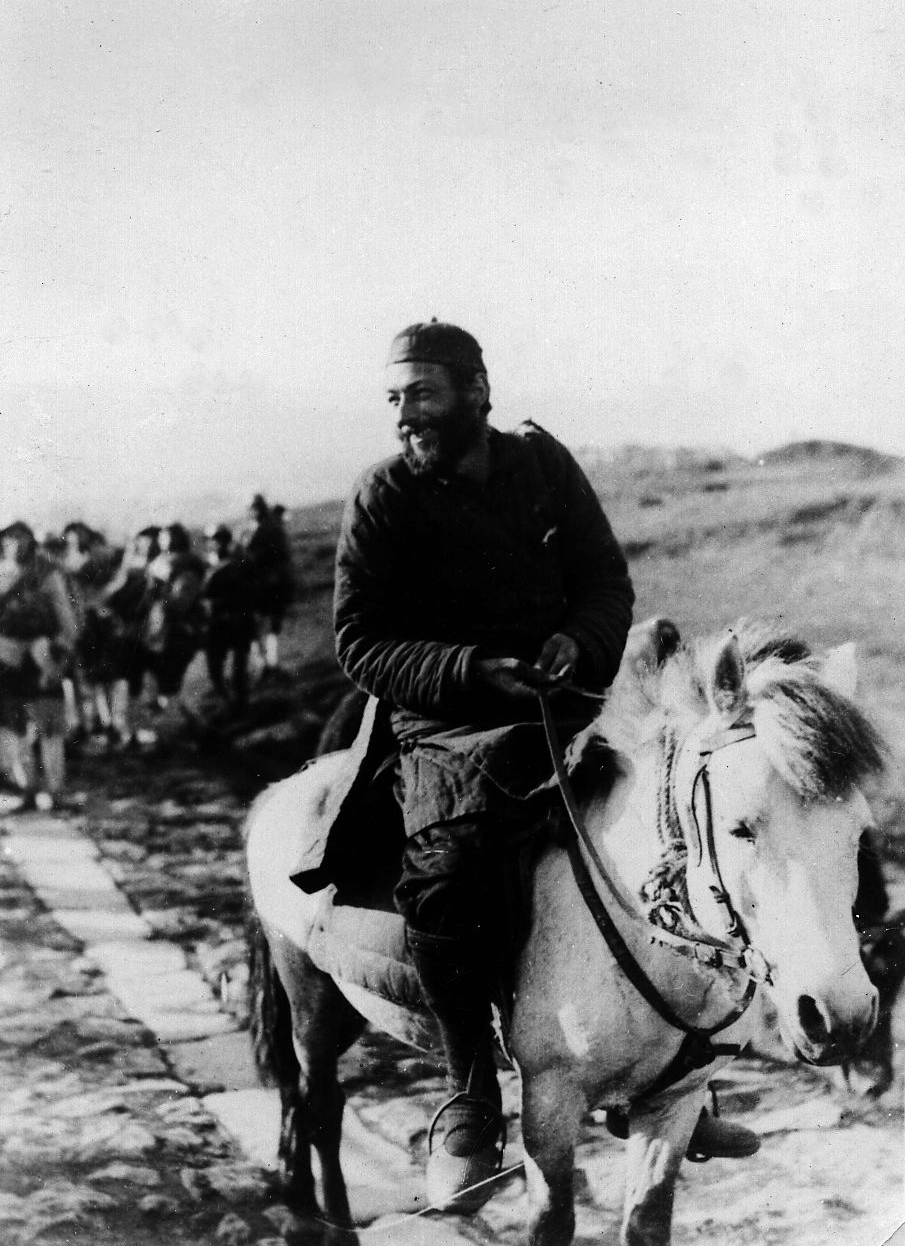
Bosshardt on horseback following his release from captivity in 1936

Bosshardt was born to Swiss parents in Manchester, England, and was accepted for training by the China Inland Mission in 1920. Within two years he departed for China and was assigned to work in Guizhou Province. He was married to Rose Piaget (1894-1965) in Guiyang in June 1931. On 1 October 1934, exactly 12 years after he had left for China, while returning from a prayer conference with Rose and several other missionaries, they were captured by soldiers of the Red Army led by General Xiao Ke. Rose was later released, but he and a fellow CIM missionary, Arnolis Hayman, from New Zealand, were forced to join the Red Army on the weary trek, which later became known as the Long March. He trudged 2500 miles during the 18 months of captivity. He was released on Easter morning 1936, after 560 days.

After being restored to health in Europe and doing many speaking engagements, he returned to China in 1940, until, like many foreign missionaries, he and Rose were expelled from China in 1951. They went on to work in Laos among the many Chinese who lived there. Following Rose's death in 1965, he returned and settled in Manchester in 1966, opening his house to Chinese students. There he continued a fruitful ministry to the Chinese and was a founder-member of the Manchester Chinese Christian Church, while remaining a faithful member of Union Hall Evangelical Church. The longest mile was his last, which he spent in a home for retired CIM missionaries in Pembury, Tunbridge Wells, Kent.

In 1973, Bosshardt published The Guiding Hand: Captivity and Answered Prayer in China, written with Gwen and Edward England. In 1989, the Chinese edition was published, with a foreword written by General Xiao Ke, where he stated that the book was the most accurate account on the Long March written by a foreigner.

He died at the age of 96 of bronchitis, in his room at Cornford House.

== Bibliography ==
- R. A. Bosshardt, The Restraining Hand: Captivity for Christ in China (1936)
- R. A. Boßhardt, Im Schatten des Allmächtigen. Erlebnisse des Missionars R. A. Boßhardt in der Gefangenschaft der Roten. Aus dem Englischen übersetzt von Dr. Ernst Witt. Bad Liebenzell: Buchhandlung der Liebenzeller Mission 1937 (156 S., einige Abb. auf Bildtafeln)
- R. A. Bosshardt, with Gwen and Edward England, The Guiding hand: Captivity and Answered Prayer in China (1973)
- Arnolis Hayman, A Foreign Missionary on the Long March: The Memoirs of Arnolis Hayman of the China Inland Mission (2010)
- Leslie T. Lyall, A Passion for the Impossible: The Continuing Story of the Mission Hudson Taylor Began (2d ed., 1976), chap. 3
- Harrison Salisbury, The Long March: The Untold Story (1985)
- Jean Watson, Bosshardt: A Biography (1995)
- The Guardian, November 8, 1993 (obit.)
- The Guardian, November 27, 2008.

== See also ==
- Christianity in Guizhou
- List of CIM missionaries in China (up to 1953)
