= Diocese of Nanlong =

Roman Catholic diocese in China

Diocese of Nanlong Dioecesis Nganlomensis 天主教安龙教区

Location
- Country: China
- Ecclesiastical province: Guiyang
- Metropolitan: Guiyang

Statistics
- Area: 45,000 km^{2} (17,000 sq mi)

Information
- Denomination: Catholic Church
- Sui iuris church: Latin Church
- Rite: Roman Rite

Current leadership
- Pope: Leo XIV
- Bishop: Sede Vacante
- Metropolitan Archbishop: Paul Xiao Zejiang

Map
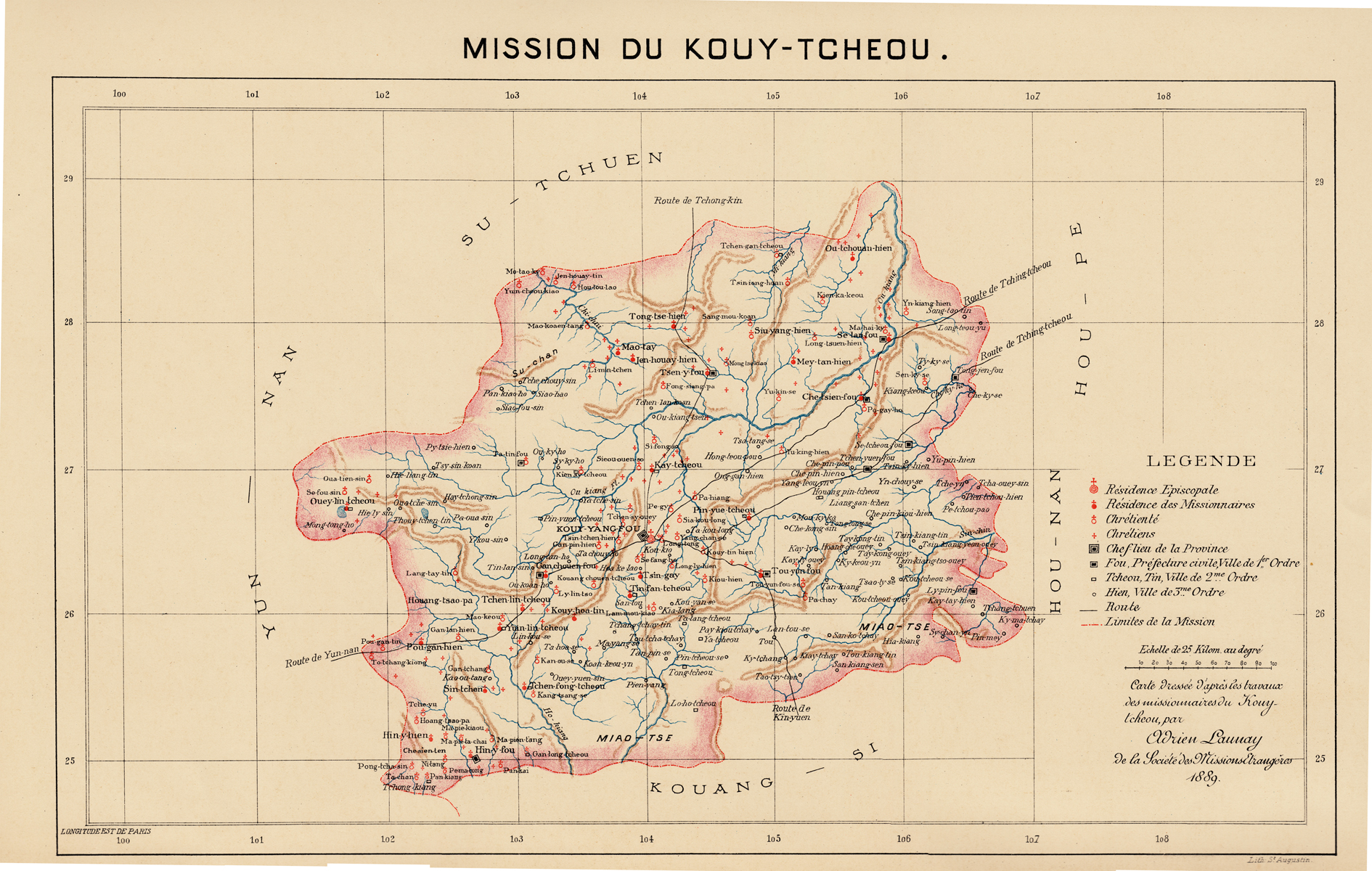
- Map of the Kweichow Mission, prepared by Adrien Launay, 1889.

The Diocese of Nanlong/Anlong (Latin: Nganlomen(sis), Chinese: 南龍, 安龍) is a diocese located in Anlong (Guizhou) in the ecclesiastical province of Guiyang in western China.

== History ==
- February 16, 1922: Established as Apostolic Prefecture of Nanlong 南龍/Anlong/Hin-y-fou 安龍/興義府 from the Apostolic Vicariate of Kweichow 貴州 and Apostolic Vicariate of Kwanghsi 廣西
- April 27, 1927: Promoted as Apostolic Vicariate of Nanlong 南龍/Anlong 安龍
- April 11, 1946: Promoted as Diocese of Nanlong 南龍/Anlong 安龍

== Leadership ==
- Bishops of Nanlong 南龍 (Roman rite)
  - Bishop Alexandre-François-Marie Carlo, M.E.P. (April 11, 1946 – January 26, 1952)
- Vicars Apostolic of Nanlong 南龍 (Roman Rite)
  - Bishop Alexandre-François-Marie Carlo, M.E.P. (April 21, 1927 – April 11, 1946)
- Prefects Apostolic of Nanlong 南龍 (Roman Rite)
  - Fr. Alexandre-François-Marie Carlo, M.E.P. (later Bishop) (November 22, 1922 – April 21, 1927)
