= Archdiocese of Guiyang =

Roman Catholic archdiocese in China

Coordinates: 26.5833°N 106.7170°E

Archdiocese of Guiyang Archidioecesis Coeiiamensis 天主教貴陽總教區 天主教贵阳总教区
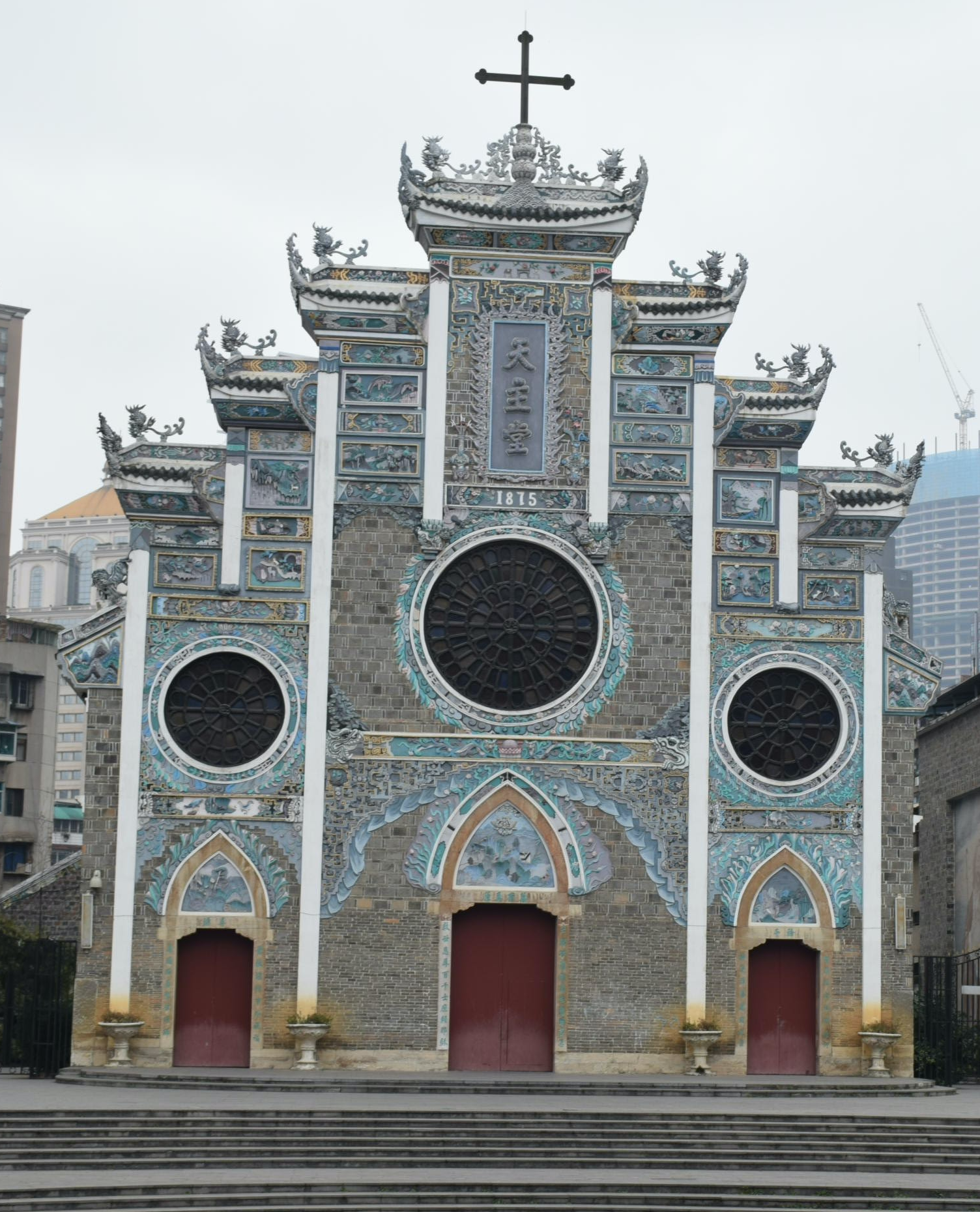
- St. Joseph's Cathedral, Guiyang

Location
- Country: China
- Ecclesiastical province: Guiyang

Statistics
- Area: 100,000 km^{2} (39,000 sq mi)
- Population: Total; Catholics: (as of 1950); 7,000,000; 24,713 (0.4%)

Information
- Denomination: Catholic Church
- Sui iuris church: Latin Church
- Rite: Roman Rite
- Cathedral: St. Joseph's Cathedral, Guiyang

Current leadership
- Pope: Leo XIV
- Metropolitan Archbishop: Paul Xiao Zejiang

Map
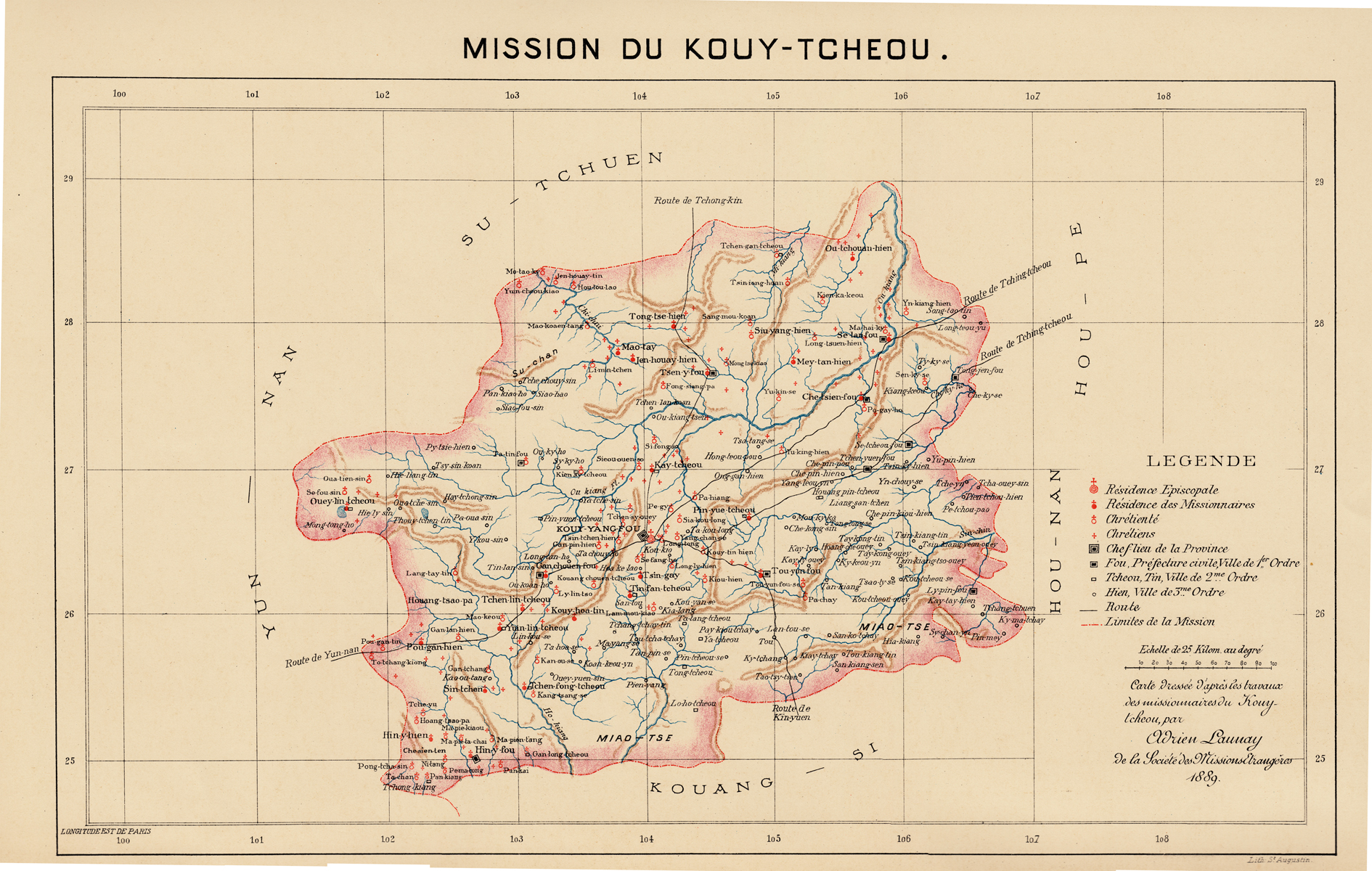
- Map of the Kweichow Mission, prepared by Adrien Launay, 1889.

The Archdiocese of Guiyang (formerly spelled Kweyang; Latin: Archidioecesis Coeiiamensis; simplified Chinese: 天主教贵阳总教区; traditional Chinese: 天主教貴陽總教區) is an archdiocese located in the city of Guiyang, provincial capital of Guizhou (formerly, Kweichow; French: Kouy-tcheou), southwestern China.

== History ==
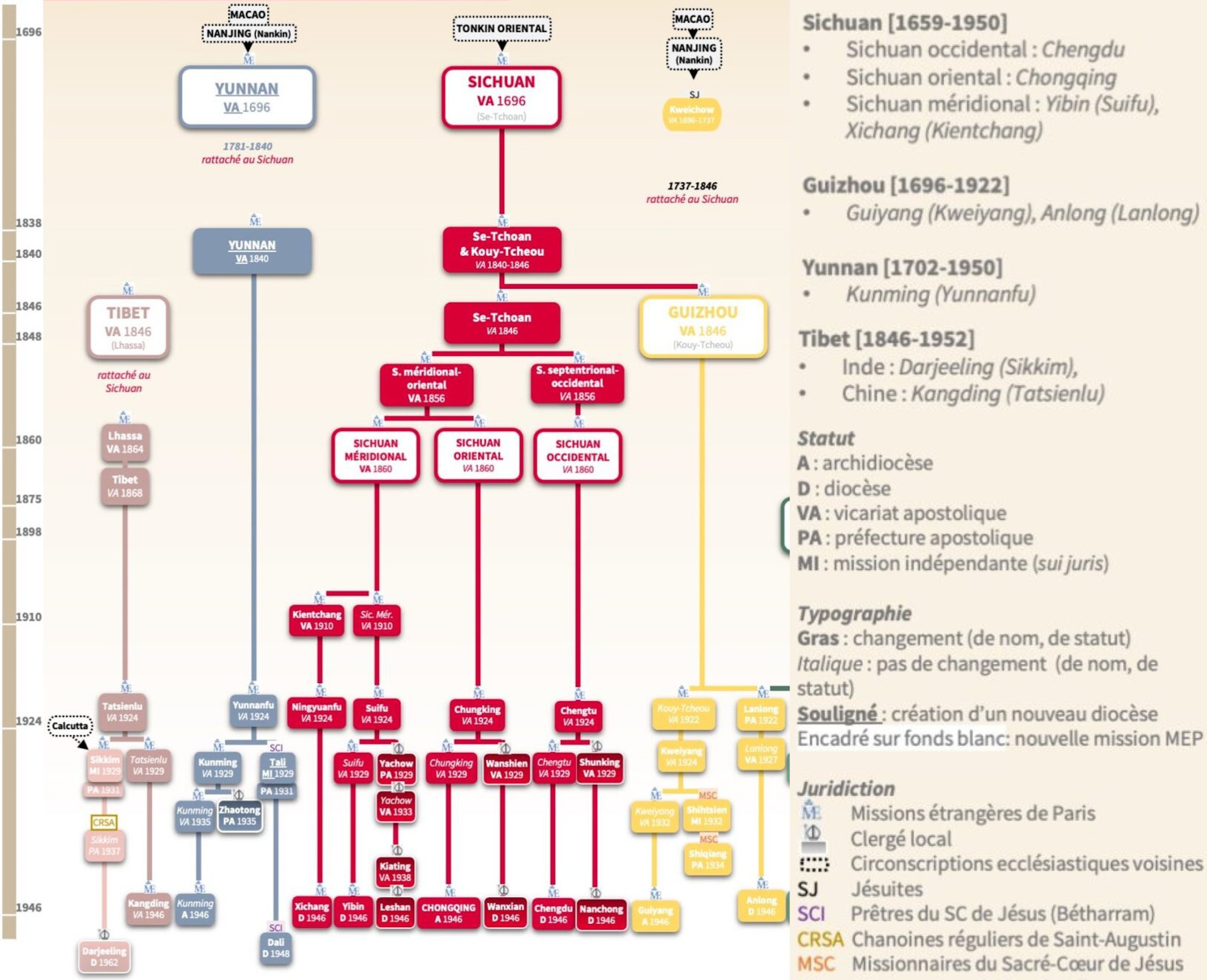
Genealogy of MEP ecclesiastical jurisdiction in Szechwan, with its three attachments: Tibet, Yunnan and Kweichow.

On April 24, 1690, at the time of the creation of the bishoprics of Beijing and Nanjing by Pope Alexander VIII, Guizhou came under the authority of the latter. During a new division on October 15, 1696, Guizhou became an apostolic vicariate in its own right. However, in 1715, the then Apostolic Vicar of Kweichow, Claude de Visdelou, saw clearly that he was absolutely unable to take charge of the province, and handed over the Mission of Guizhou to Johannes Müllener, Apostolic Vicar of Szechwan. The Vicariate of Kweichow had not been re-erected until March 27, 1846.

Guizhou was evangelized by missionaries from Sichuan (Szechwan) during the 18th and 19th centuries. At that time, the Catholic Church in Sichuan produced a number of itinerant catechists (i.e. local missionaries) thanks to a well-organized training system. Since 1774, evangelization was carried out by Jean-Martin Moye, provicar of Eastern Szechwan (future Archdiocese of Chongqing), and a Sichuanese missionary, Benoît Sen. In 1798, Laurent Hou, (Note: Laurent Hou Che-lou or Lawrence Hu Shï-lu (Chinese: 胡世祿)) also a missionary from Sichuan, built a small church in Guiyang (Kweyang; Kouy-yang-fou) for the Catholic community of about 100 people, which later became St. Joseph's Cathedral.

On December 3, 1924, the Apostolic Vicariate of Kweichow was renamed Apostolic Vicariate of Kweyang, and on April 11, 1946, it was elevated to the rank of archdiocese.

== Bishops ==
Vicars Apostolic of Kweichow

- Carlo Giovanni Turcotti, S.J. (1696 – October 15, 1706)
- Claude de Visdelou, S.J. (January 12, 1708 – November 11, 1737)
- Suppressed, remained dependent upon the Apostolic Vicariate of Szechwan (1715–1846)
- Étienne-Raymond Albrand, M.E.P. (August 13, 1846 – April 22, 1853)
- Louis-Simon Faurie, M.E.P. (1853 – June 21, 1871)
- François-Eugène Lions, M.E.P. (December 22, 1871 – April 24, 1893)
- François-Lazare Seguin, M.E.P. (October 21, 1913 – December 3, 1924)

Vicars Apostolic of Kweyang

- François-Lazare Seguin, M.E.P. (December 3, 1924 – September 11, 1942)
- Jean Larrart, M.E.P. (later Archbishop) (September 13, 1942 – April 11, 1946)

Archbishop of Kweyang

- Jean Larrart, M.E.P. (April 11, 1946 – July 14, 1966)

Archbishops of Guiyang

- Uncanonical, i.e. without papal mandate: Chen Yuancai (June 15, 1958 – July 24, 1977)
- Sede vacante (1966–1987)
- Underground bishop: Augustine Hu Daguo (1987–1997)
- Anicetus Andrew Wang Chong-yi (December 4, 1988 – September 8, 2014)
- Paul Xiao Zejiang (September 8, 2014 –)

== Suffragan dioceses ==
- Nanlong

== See also ==
- Christianity in Guizhou
- Apostolic Prefecture of Shiqian
- Archdiocese of Kunming

== Bibliography ==
- Launay, Adrien (1907). Mission du Kouy-tcheou, tome premier (in French). Paris: Société des Missions-Étrangères.

== Sources and external links ==
- "Metropolitan Archdiocese of Guiyang". gcatholic.org.
- "Archdiocese of Guiyang [Kweyang]". catholic-hierarchy.org.
