= Paul Xiao Zejiang =

Chinese Catholic priest and bishop

- Bishop of the Roman Catholic Archdiocese of Guiyang
- Church: Cathedral of St Joseph in Guiyang
- Province: Guizhou
- Diocese: Roman Catholic Archdiocese of Guiyang
- See: Guiyang
- Installed: 2014
- Predecessor: Anicetus Andrew Wang Chong-yi

Orders
- Ordination: 5 June 1994
- Consecration: 8 September 2007 by Anicetus Andrew Wang Chong-yi

Personal details
- Born: October 30, 1967 (age 58) Sinan, Guizhou, China
- Denomination: Roman Catholic
- Motto: Ad maiorem Dei gloriam
- Coat of arms

Chinese name
- Traditional Chinese: 蕭澤江
- Simplified Chinese: 萧泽江
Transcriptions
Standard Mandarin
- Hanyu Pinyin: Xiāo Zéjiāng

Paul Xiao Zejiang (Chinese: 萧泽江; born 30 October 1967) was a Chinese Catholic priest and Bishop of the Roman Catholic Archdiocese of Guiyang since 2014.

== Biography ==
Xiao was born in Guizhou on 30 October 1967. He was ordained a priest in 1994.

In October 2006, the Holy See announced the decision to appoint Paul Xiao Zejiang as archbishop of the Roman Catholic Archdiocese of Guiyang. The episcopal ordination ceremony was held on September 8, 2007. He received his episcopal ordination with the papal mandate on September 8, 2007. The Chinese government also recognized him as the Bishop of the Diocese of Guizhou, a diocese set up illegally by the Chinese government in 1999, which corresponds to the whole of Guizhou province.

On September 8, 2014, after the retirement of his predecessor, he became Archbishop Metropolitan of Guiyang.

Catholic Church titles
Previous: Anicetus Andrew Wang Chong-yi	Bishop of the Roman Catholic Archdiocese of Guiyang; 2014	Incumbent
