= Anicetus Andrew Wang Chong-yi =

- Archbishop of Guiyang
- Native name: 王充一
- Church: Catholic Church
- Archdiocese: Archdiocese of Guiyang
- In office: 4 December 1988 – 8 September 2014
- Predecessor: Augustine Hu Daguo
- Successor: Paul Xiao Zejiang

Orders
- Ordination: October 1949
- Consecration: 4 December 1988 by Joseph Zong Huaide

Personal details
- Born: 26 October 1919 Huangguoshu Town, Zhenning County, Kweichow, Republic of China
- Died: 20 April 2017 (aged 97)

Anicetus Andrew Wang Chong-yi (26 October 1919 – 20 April 2017) was a Chinese Roman Catholic bishop.

He came from a Catholic family and attended the boys' seminary of Guiyang, the capital of Ghizhou Province in southwestern China, and entered the Saint Paul seminary.

Ordained priest on October 24, 1949, Wang Chong-yi worked in pastoral care in Meitan and Zunyi. Much later he was arrested during the Cultural Revolution and sentenced to nine years of forced labor in a forced labor camp. Only in 1979 he was allowed to work again as a pastor. Wang Chong-yi served as archbishop of the Archdiocese of Guiyang, China, for the Chinese Patriotic Catholic Association from 1988 until 2014.

Wang Chong-yi was elected bishop of Guiyang in 1987 and was ordained as a bishop on 4 December 1988 in Beijing. The Holy See gave its approval of Wang Chong-yi being elected and ordained a Catholic bishop. On 8 September 2014, he submitted his resignation request, which Pope Francis accepted on 4 March 2015. He died in 2017, aged 97 and was buried in the Cathedral of Guiyang.

== Notes ==
Catholic Church titles
Previous: Augustine Hu Daguo	Bishop of the Roman Catholic Archdiocese of Guiyang; 1988–2014	Next: Paul Xiao Zejiang
