= Peter Wu Guosheng =

Chinese Catholic martyr

Saint Peter Wu Guosheng
- Born: Wu Guocheng; 1768; Longping, China
- Died: November 7, 1814 (aged 45–46); Longping, China
- Cause of death: Hanging
- Venerated in: Catholic Church
- Beatified: 27 May 1900 by Leo XIII
- Canonized: 1 October 2000 by John Paul II

Peter Wu Guosheng (traditional Chinese: 吳國盛; simplified Chinese: 吴国盛; pinyin: Wú Guóchéng; 1768 – 7 November 1814) was a Chinese Catholic martyr.

== Life ==
He was born in 1768 in the town of Longping in Zunyi county in Guizhou. Prior to his baptism, he was an innkeeper. He was known in his community for his sense of justice, his care of the poor and his enthusiastic and outspoken nature.

A Catholic layman named Xu, who had been sent to Guizhou by Fr. Luo Madi of Sichuan, stayed at Wu Guosheng's inn. On this occasion, Xu spoke to Wu Guosheng about Christianity and convinced Wu Guosheng to believe. Xu later invited a church elder from Sichuan to speak to Wu Guosheng.

Wu Guosheng became very fervent for the faith and, although he was not yet baptized, he would insist that those who visited his inn come to accept Jesus. Fr. Luo Madi later also went to visit Wu Guosheng and felt that Wu Guosheng's way of trying to force people to accept the faith was wrong. He then invited Wu Guosheng to come to Sichuan and see how other Catholics carried out evangelization. In 1795, he came to Chongqing and after having seen the model of other Catholics, Wu Guosheng deeply regretted his prior behaviour. Luo Madi then baptized him the following year with the name Christian name of Peter.

He returned to Longping and engaged in a great deal of evangelization among the local people. The Catholic community grew to several hundred people.

In 1814, a new wave of persecution against Christians occurred in China as a result of the policies of the Jiaqing Emperor. On April 3rd of that year, he was arrested and put in prison. He encouraged the other prisoners and refused the orders of the magistrate to trample on the cross. He was strangled by hanging on November 7th of that year.

== Canonization ==
He was beatified by Pope Leo XIII on 27 May 1900 and later canonized as a saint by John Paul II on 1 October 2000.
