= Cutting, Moselle =

Cutting
- Commune
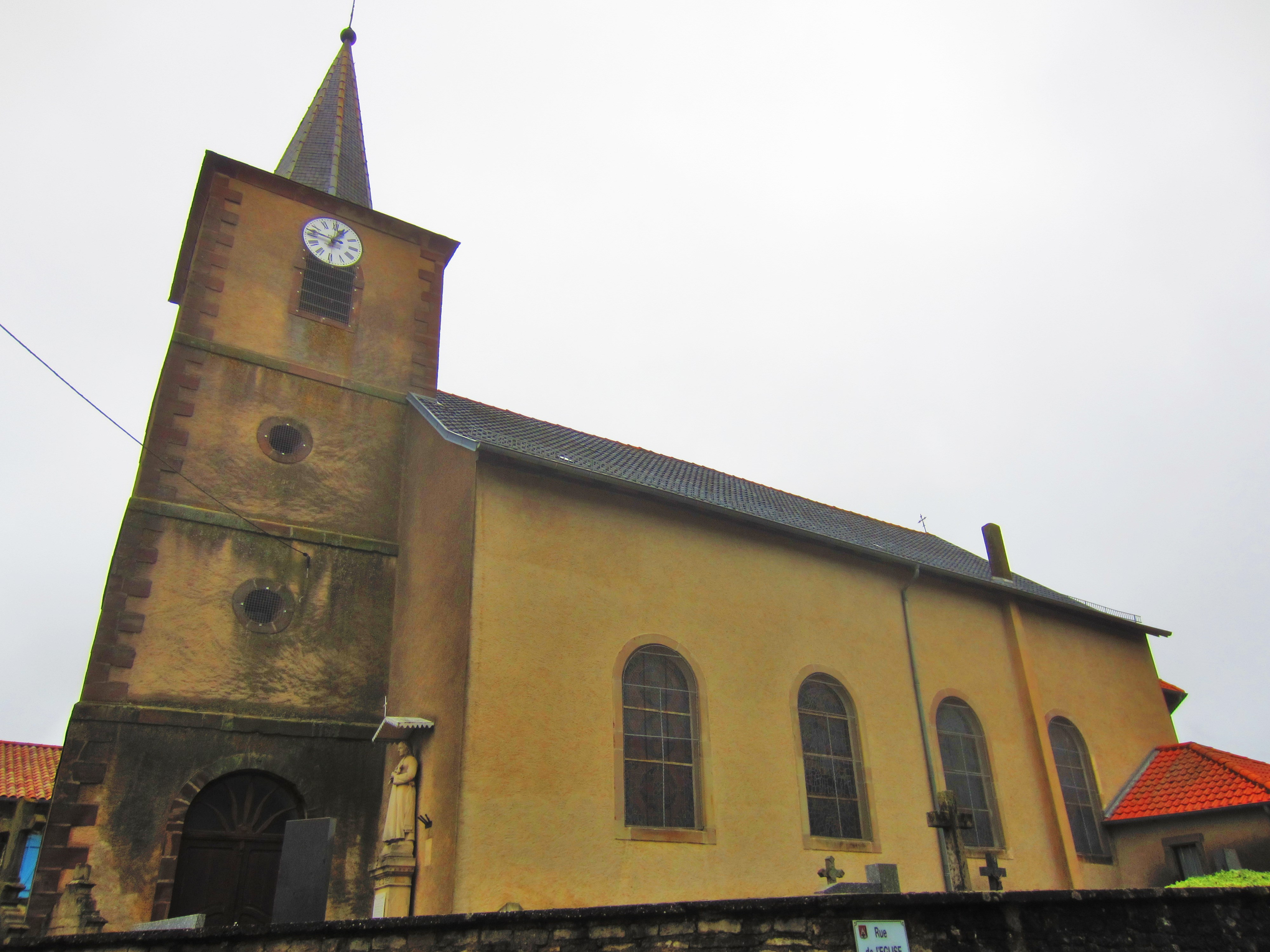
- The church in Cutting

- Coat of arms
- Location of Cutting
- Location within France Location within Grand Est
- Coordinates: 48°50′58″N 6°50′07″E
- Country: France
- Region: Grand Est
- Department: Moselle
- Arrondissement: Sarrebourg-Château-Salins
- Canton: Le Saulnois
- Intercommunality: CC du Saulnois

Government
  - Mayor (2020–2026): Germain Imhoff
- Area^{1}: 5.62 km^{2} (2.17 sq mi)
- Elevation: 253 m (830 ft)
- Highest elevation: 256 m (840 ft)
- Lowest elevation: 213 m (699 ft)
- Population (2023): 96
  - Density: 17/km^{2} (44/sq mi)
- Time zone: UTC+01:00 (CET)
  - Summer (DST): UTC+02:00 (CEST)
- INSEE/Postal code: 57161 /57260
- ^{1} French Land Register data, which excludes lakes, ponds, glaciers > 1 km^{2} (0.386 sq mi or 247 acres) and river estuaries.

Cutting (French pronunciation: [kytɛ̃]; German: Kuttingen) is a commune in the Moselle department in Grand Est in north-eastern France.

== History ==
Previous names: Kuctinga (1328), Kuttanges (1476), Kuttingen (1525), Kuchtingen (1575), Kutingen (1600), Kittingen (1665), Kutting (1801).

== See also ==
- Communes of the Moselle department
