= Christianity in Guizhou =

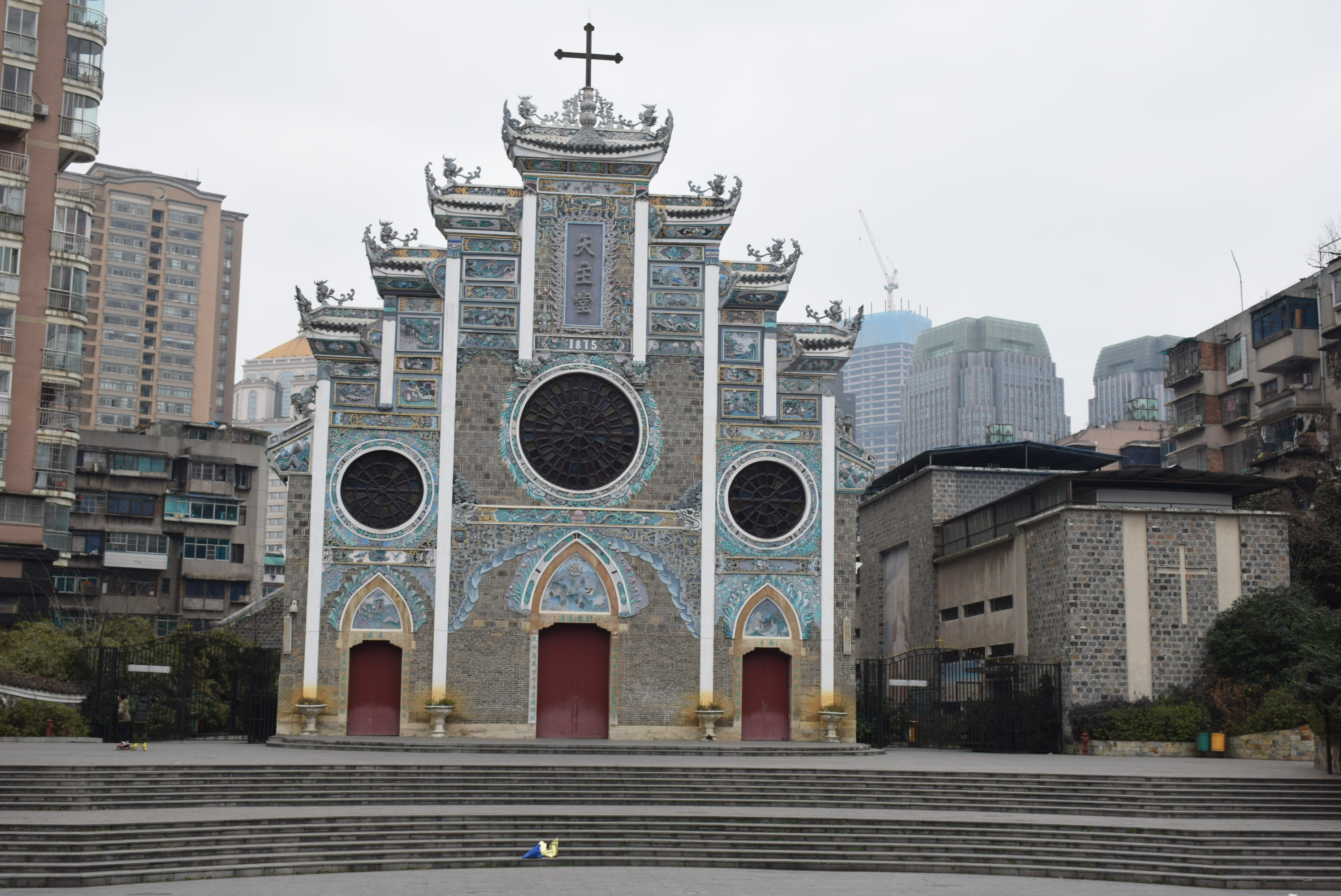
St. Joseph's Cathedral, Guiyang

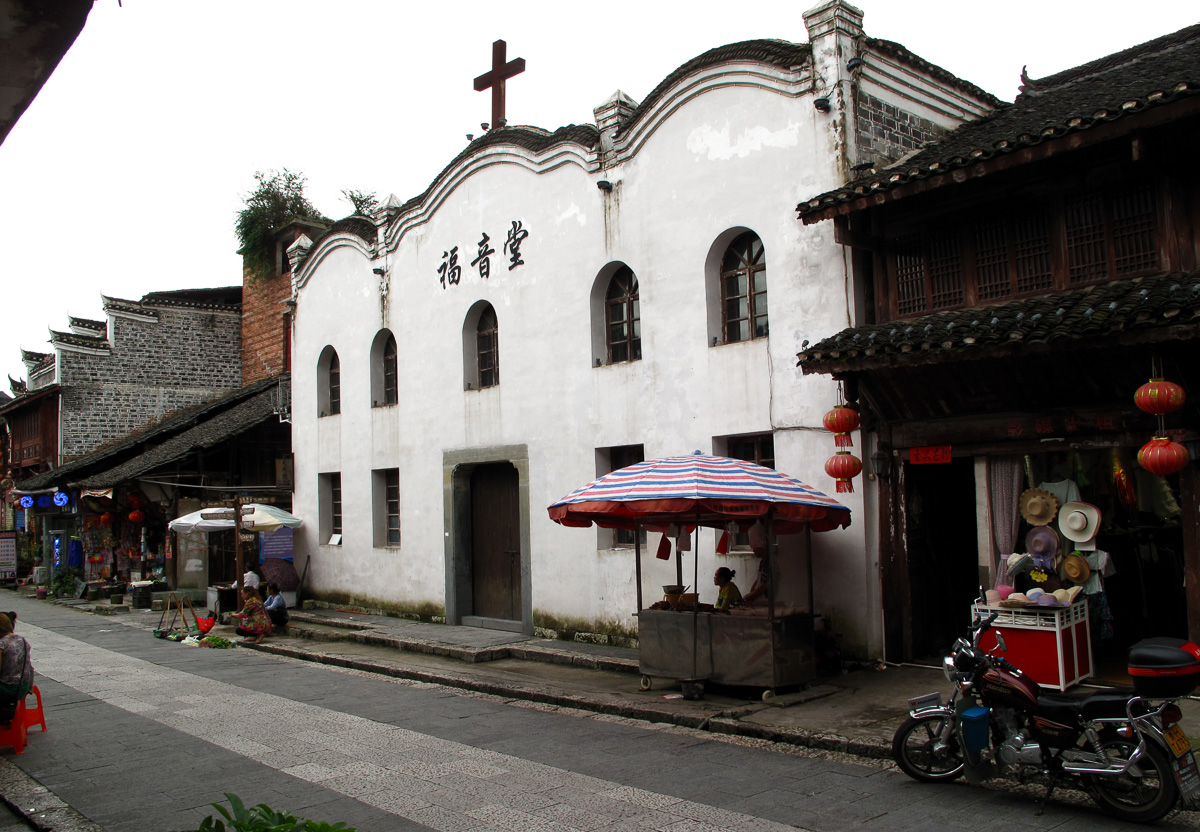
Protestant Gospel Church, Liping

Christianity is a minority religion in the Chinese province of Guizhou. Gha-Mu and A-Hmao are ethnic groups with a proportionately larger share of Christians.

== Overview ==
The Roman Catholic Archdiocese of Guiyang and the Roman Catholic Diocese of Nanlong have their seats in the province. Sam Pollard was a missionary of China Inland Mission, who was active among the A-Hmao. When the new government took power in 1949, Guizhou may have had about 40,000 Protestants. The current Protestant population is at about half a million. Persecution of Christians occurs in Guizhou.

== See also ==
- Agatha Lin – Catholic martyr saint from Guizhou
- Agnes Tsao Kou Ying – Catholic martyr saint from Guizhou
- Lucy Yi Zhenmei – Sichuanese Catholic missionary in Guizhou, martyr saint
- Rudolf Alfred Bosshardt – Protestant missionary in Guizhou
- Christianity in Guizhou's neighbouring provinces
  - Christianity in Hunan
  - Christianity in Sichuan
