= Sheikh bagh cemetery =

Christian cemetery in Jammu and Kashmir

Sheikh Bagh Cemetery
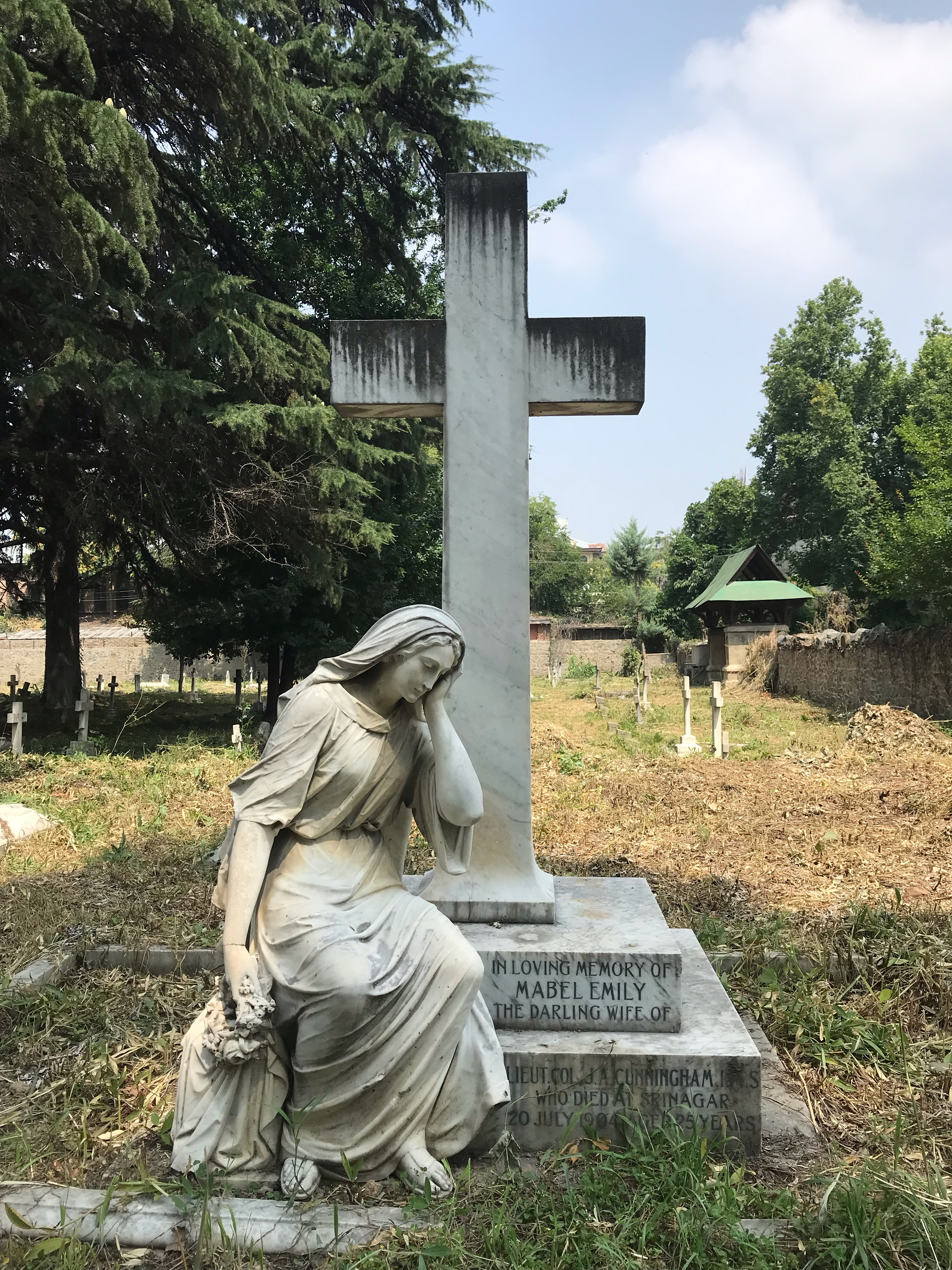
- A gravestone at Sheikh Bagh Cemetery
- Interactive map of Sheikh Bagh Cemetery

Details
- Established: 1700; 326 years ago
- Location: Srinagar, Jammu and Kashmir
- Country: India
- Coordinates: 34°04′14″N 74°48′46″E
- Type: Public
- Owned by: Catholic Church and CNI

Sheikh bagh cemetery is the one and only Christian cemetery in the Srinagar city of Jammu and Kashmir. It is a British era cemetery and hence is also claimed as heritage. The cemetery is accessed by the Roman Catholic church, CNI and other Christian denominations in Srinagar, Kashmir. Many gravestones bear the year 1700. Cemetery contains remains of many famous people like Robert Thorpe and Jim Borst. In 2014, the repair work of the graveyard funded by the British Association for Cemeteries in South Asia was organised, after a flood destroyed it.

== List of burials ==
1. Arthur Neve
2. Ernest Frederic Neve
3. Robert Thorpe
4. Jim Borst
5. Fanny Jane Butler
6. Nora Neve
