= St. Joseph's Hospital, Baramulla =

Coordinates: 34°12′13.2″N 74°21′07.8″E

- Franciscan Missionaries of Mary

Geography
- Location: NHA1, Baramulla, Jammu and Kashmir, India

Organisation
- Care system: Missionary
- Type: General
- Religious affiliation: Roman Catholic
- Affiliated university: The Catholic Health Association of India
- Patron: St. Joseph

Services
- Emergency department: Yes
- Beds: 300

History
- Founded: 1921; 105 years ago

Links
- Lists: Hospitals in India

St. Joseph's Hospital, Baramulla, is a Catholic hospital and School of Nursing situated in Baramulla, Jammu and Kashmir, India.

== History ==
St. Joseph Hospital was started on 21 September 1921 by Franciscan Missionaries of Mary. Franciscan Missionaries of Mary sisters came from Rawalpindi to start a hospital at the request of the Mill Hill Fathers. After setting up a temporary dispensary followed by a maternity hospital and dispensary in 1931, a full-fledged general hospital was established in 1937.

On 22 October 1947, Pashtun tribal raiders backed by Pakistan military apparatus invaded the then independent princely state of Jammu and Kashmir. They penetrated into Baramulla in the following days and went on a carnage. Six people were killed at the hospital—a British colonel and his wife, a nurse, a patient, the husband of a physician, and Sister Teresalina. (Note: Their tombs are situated within the hospital compound.) According to survivors, a missionary-educated Pakistani Army officer drove the raiders out of the hospital.

In 1965, auxiliary nurse midwifery and female multi purpose health worker courses were started at the hospital.

== Present ==
St. Joseph's Hospital, School and Catholic Church share the same campus. St. Joseph Hospital is the only Christian hospital in the valley of Kashmir. It is affiliated with the Catholic Health Association of India and Missionaries Health Services. It has served the valley in many ways.

== See also ==
List of Christian mission hospitals
