= Kang cancer =

- Specialty: Dermatology

Kang cancer is a form of squamous-celled carcinoma associated with sleeping on the traditional kang heated-brick bed of Tibet and Northern China. The kang bed is a hollow brick platform warmed by an internal coal, charcoal, or dung fire. Kang cancer often develops in previous burn scar tissue, indicating that smoke carcinogens may not play a role.

== See also ==
- Kangri ulcer
- Kairo cancer
- List of cutaneous conditions
