= St. Luke's Church, Srinagar =

Coordinates: 34.07786329°N 74.83056892°E

St. Luke's Church
- St. Luke's Church
- Location: Dalgate, Srinagar, Jammu and Kashmir
- Country: India
- Denomination: Church of North India

History
- Founders: Arthur Neve; Ernest Neve
- Dedicated: 12 September 1896
- Other dedication: 30 November 2025
- Events: Restoration (2020-21)

Architecture
- Functional status: Active
- Architectural type: Gothic

Administration
- Diocese: Diocese of Amritsar
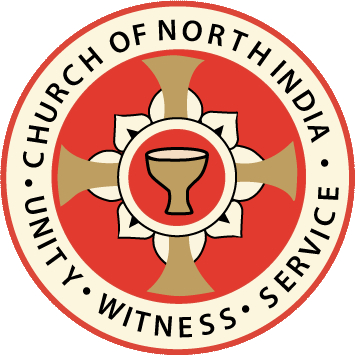

St. Luke's Church is located within the compound of the Chest Diseases Hospital at the southwest slope of Shankaracharya Hill in the Dalgate area of Srinagar in Jammu and Kashmir, India. It is the first Christian church in Kashmir. It is part of the Church of North India and is one of the remotest churches in the country.

== History ==
The Gothic-style church was built in 1896 by British engineers. The foundation stone for the church was laid on 12 September 1896 by British brothers and missionary hospital doctors, Dr Arthur Neve and Dr Ernest Neve. It was transferred to the Government of Jammu and Kashmir in the 1960s. The church remained in use until 1986 when it was abandoned due to rising militancy in the region.

In 2016, the local Christian community and priests approached the state administration to seek its renovation. However, the church had severe structural issues and required major restoration work before it could be reopened.

== Restoration ==
The Government of India had selected Srinagar as one of the cities to implement its Smart Cities Mission. As part of the mission, the Centre provided ₹90 lakh (US$94,000) for the restoration of St. Luke's Church. Renovation work began in April 2020 but faced delays due to the COVID-19 pandemic. It was completed just ahead of Christmas 2021. Due to the location of the building and the shortage of skilled masons, the restoration work was completed in stages, and the church was opened to the public after 30 years.

The main restoration process involved the ceiling of the stone and brick masonry structure which was redone with the traditional Khatamband woodwork and flooring with "Devar" stones.

== Reopening ==
Lieutenant Governor Manoj Sinha reopened the church after extensive restoration work on 23 December 2021, and the first prayer service was held at St. Luke's Church since 1986.

== Rededicated ==
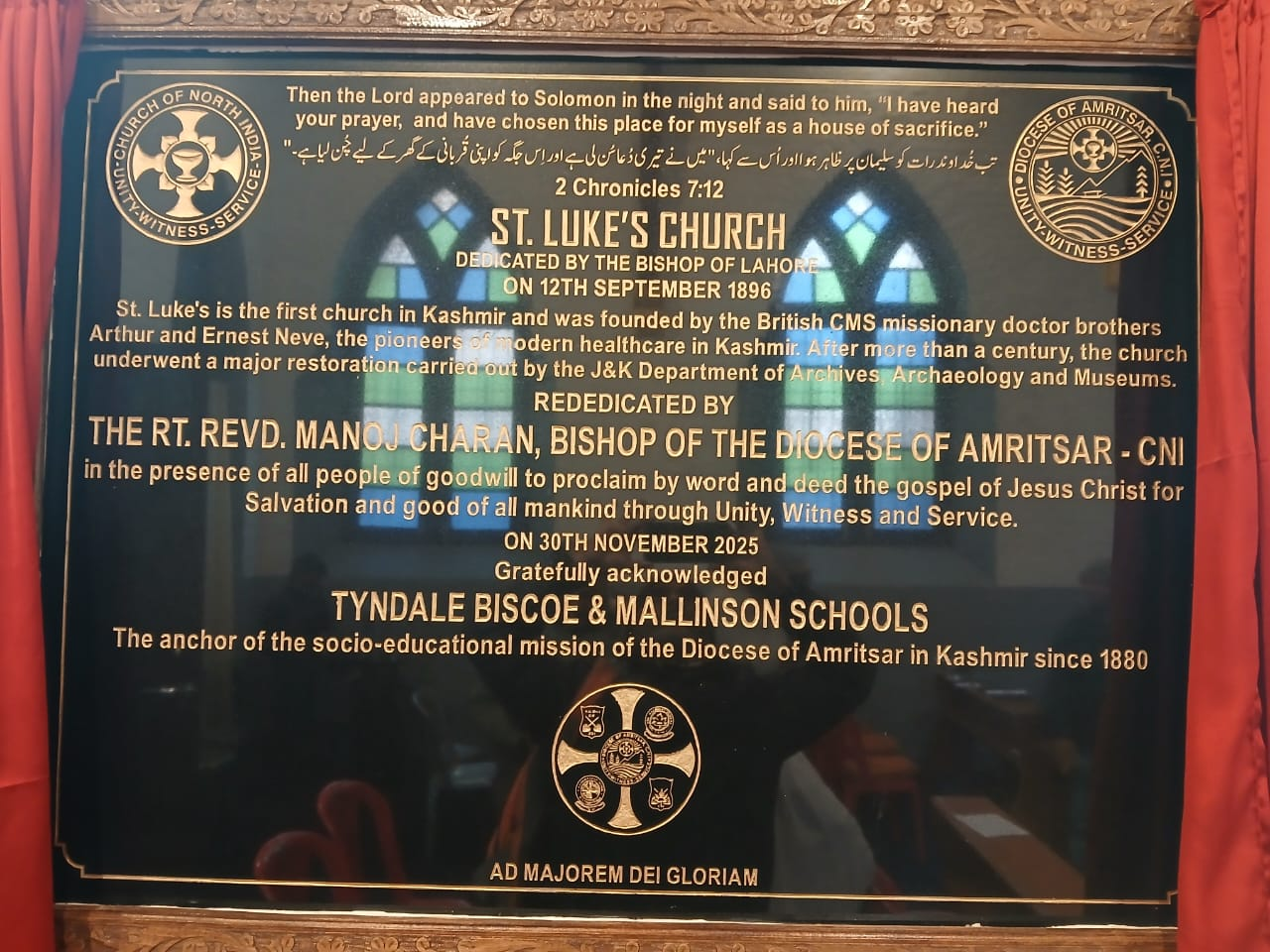
Rededication Service.

St. Luke's Church was rededicated on 30 November 2025. The rededication ceremony was conducted by the Rt. Revd. Manoj Charan, Bishop of the Diocese of Amritsarr (Church of North India).

== Bibliography ==
- Ashiq, Peerzada (2021). "The bells of St Luke's in Srinagar break 30-year silence". The Hindu.
- Stock, Eugene (1899). The History of the Church Missionary Society, Vol. 3. Google Books.
- Fayaz, Mehran; Bhat, Abrar (2021). "125-Year-Old Church in Srinagar Restored to 'Lost Glory' Ahead of Christmas". The Quint.
- "In Kashmir Valley, a 125-y-old church opens again for prayers". The Indian Express (2021).
- "Over 120 Years Old Church Reopens In Srinagar After 30 Years". NDTV / PTI (2021).
- Maqbool, Majid (2021). "Srinagar's Oldest Church, Abandoned for Decades, Gets a Facelift Ahead of Christmas". The Wire.
- Bhat, Sunil (2021). "100-year-old St Luke's Church renovated, reopened after 30 years in Srinagar". India Today.
- "Carols to ring out as historic Kashmir church reopens after decades of violence". The Times (2021).
