= Robert Thorp =

Robert Thorp may refer to:

- Robert Thorp (MP) (1900–1966), Conservative party MP in England
- Robert Taylor Thorp (1850–1938), US Congressman
- Robert Thorp (priest) (1736–1812), Archdeacon of Northumberland
- Robert Thorp (judge) (died 1291), Justice of the Common Pleas
- Robert Thorp (Indian Army officer) (1838–1868), author of Kashmir Misgovernment

== See also ==
- Robert Thorpe (disambiguation)
