= Jim Borst =

Dutch Roman Catholic missionary

The Reverend Fr. Jim Borst MHM
- Missionary Priest
- Church: Roman Catholic Church
- Archdiocese: Delhi
- Diocese: Jammu-Srinagar

Orders
- Ordination: 7 May 1957 by William Cardinal Godfrey
- Rank: Catholic Priest

Personal details
- Born: August 3, 1932 Ursem Netherlands
- Died: September 5, 2018 (aged 86) Srinagar, Jammu and Kashmir, India
- Buried: Sheikh Bagh Cemetery
- Education: University of Cambridge

Jim Borst (3 August 1932 – 5 September 2018) was a Dutch Roman Catholic missionary of Saint Joseph's Missionary Society of Mill Hill, commonly called Mill Hill Missionaries. He was well-known spiritual leader in India and abroad. He was a frequent speaker at many conventions and seminars. In 2011, he was summoned by Sharia court and served a Fatwa in 2012, following which he was given a Quit India Notice from Kashmir's Foreigners Registration Office. He was the last Mill Hill missionary serving in the Kashmir Valley.

== Early life and education ==
He was born on 3 August 1932 in Ursem, Netherlands to Mr. Leonard and Mrs. Margaret. He completed his secondary education at Hoorn, Tilburg and Burn Hall. He joined Saint Joseph's Missionary Society of Mill Hill in 1945 and from 1951 to 1953 studied philosophy in Roosendaal. He completed his studies of theology in 1957 from Mill Hill, London. He was ordained a priest for Saint Joseph's Missionary Society of Mill Hill, in London, United Kingdom on 7 May 1957 by William Cardinal Godfrey. After ordination he studied Science and Economics at Cambridge University and completed his master's degree in Arts. He started to serve his mission as a Parish Priest in Jammu and Kashmir, India, in September 1963.

== Missionary work in India ==
In 1975 Jim, decided to serve as a travelling missionary and traveled throughout India conducting charismatic renewal conventions, retreats for priests and religious, and ‘village retreat ministry’. He returned to Kashmir in year 1991 and helped in translating New Testament in Kashmiri. He also established two schools in Kashmir by the name Good Shepherd. He also founded Good Shepherd Sisters community but the congregation could not survive. He also helped in drawing current Constitutions and Directives around the time of the 1982 Chapter for the Mill Hill Society.

== Field of education ==
Borst was the principal of St. Joseph's School (Baramulla) from 1974 to 1975 and served as a parish priest of St. Joseph's Catholic Church (Baramulla). He directed Burn Hall School Srinagar for some time. He also translated the Holy Bible into the local Kashmiri language (Koshur).

Borst started two charitable schools, one in Srinagar and other in Pulwama named "Good Shepherd Mission School". He is the author of several books and articles.

== Writings ==
- A Method of Contemplative Prayer
- Coming to God in the Stillness
- From Holland with love: The life of a Mill Hill missionary founder of the Sisters of our Lady of Fatima, Francis Xavier Kroot, 1854-1900

== Death ==
In August 2018, he suffered a heart attack and was admitted to a hospital in New Delhi. He was operated on and a pacemaker was installed. Fr. Borst died on 5 September 2018 at 11:45 am in Srinagar, Kashmir. He was suffering from heart ailment and had recently received treatment. Funeral was conducted on 7 September 2018 at Holy Family Catholic Church. He was buried at Sheikh Bagh Cemetery, Srinagar, Kashmir.
