= Robert Thorpe =

Robert Thorpe may refer to:

- Sir Robert Thorpe, Master of Pembroke Hall, 1347–1362
- Robert Thorpe (Lord Chancellor) (died 1372), British judge
- Robert Thorpe (priest) (died 1591), English Roman Catholic priest and martyr
- Robert Thorpe (judge) (c. 1764–1836), Canadian judge and political figure
- Robert Thorpe (Indian Army officer) (1838–1868), soldier and chronicler on Kashmir
- Bob Thorpe (outfielder) (1926–1996), Major League Baseball right fielder
- Bob Thorpe (pitcher) (1935–1960), American professional baseball pitcher
- Robbie Thorpe (born 1970s), Aboriginal Australian activist and radio presenter

== See also ==
- Robert Thorp (disambiguation)
- Bob Thorpe (disambiguation)
