= Pro-Pakistan sentiment =

Philia for Pakistan and/or Pakistani culture and people

Pro-Pakistan sentiment is fondness and love of aspects of Pakistani culture, Pakistani history, Pakistani cuisine, Pakistani traditions or the people of Pakistan.

It can refer to having positive sentiments for the Pakistani state in the political context.

The like or interest of Pakistan is the opposite of Pakophobia, Pakistanophobia or Anti-Pakistan sentiment, which is the fear and dislike of things concerning Pakistan.

In Pakistan, pro-Pakistan sentiment is often linked with national pride, patriotism, and identity. Pakistan was created in 1947 when British India was divided, and this event was important for the Muslim community. People in Pakistan show their pro-Pakistan sentiment by celebrating national events and supporting their leaders.

== In Kashmir ==
During the 2011 ICC World Cup semi-final between Pakistan and India, a Times of India article observed that Srinagar was "shut down" for the clash, children stayed home from school, and some Kashmiri cricket fans showed their support for the Pakistani cricket team instead of the Indian team. On 13 October 1983, during a limited over cricket match between West Indies and India at Sher-i-Kashmir Stadium in Srinagar, the crowd cheered India's defeat with Pakistan Zindabad cries. The slogan, Pakistan Zindabad, has been used by some Kashmiri Muslims, who demand Kashmir's accession to Pakistan, in the Indian Kashmir. Local police also detain supporters for raising such slogans.

Kashmiri journalist Gowhar Geelani cites that much of the pro-Pakistan sentiment in Kashmir is suppressed, the roots of which lie in the Kashmir conflict. However, he adds that "many in Kashmir continue to express their love for Pakistan overtly", either through supporting the Pakistani cricket team, hoisting Pakistan's flag, setting the Pakistani national anthem as their mobile ringtone or raising pro-Pakistan slogans during public rallies. Anuradha Bhasin states that it has to do with a "deep anger against the Indian state and deep-rooted alienation with India’s treatment of Kashmir", while Showkat Hussain states that such pro-Pakistani sentiment is attributable to the "sentiment for secession". Still, other commentators opine that there is also a younger Kashmiri generation that sees their economic future tied to India while not entirely wanting to compromise their aspiration for Kashmiri 'independence', and that this generation includes those who are pro-India or do not support a Kashmiri merger with Pakistan. Khurram Parvez is of the view that many Kashmiri youth "openly showcase their love for Pakistan at the cost of paying heavily for their expression", but that at the same time, this sentiment does not necessarily translate to a desire for Kashmir's outright merger with Pakistan.

== In Bangladesh ==
In 2024, professor Nazmul Ahsan Kalimullah noted the rise in anti-Indian sentiment and pro-Pakistani sentiment in Bangladesh. He added that it could impact the relationship between the two countries, India and Bangladesh.

== See also ==
- Culture of Pakistan
- Pakistani cuisine
- Languages of Pakistan
- Pakistani nationalism
- Tourism in Pakistan
- Dil Dil Pakistan
- Pakistan Zindabad
