= St. Joseph's Catholic Church (Baramulla) =

- سینٹ جوزف کیتھولک چرچ
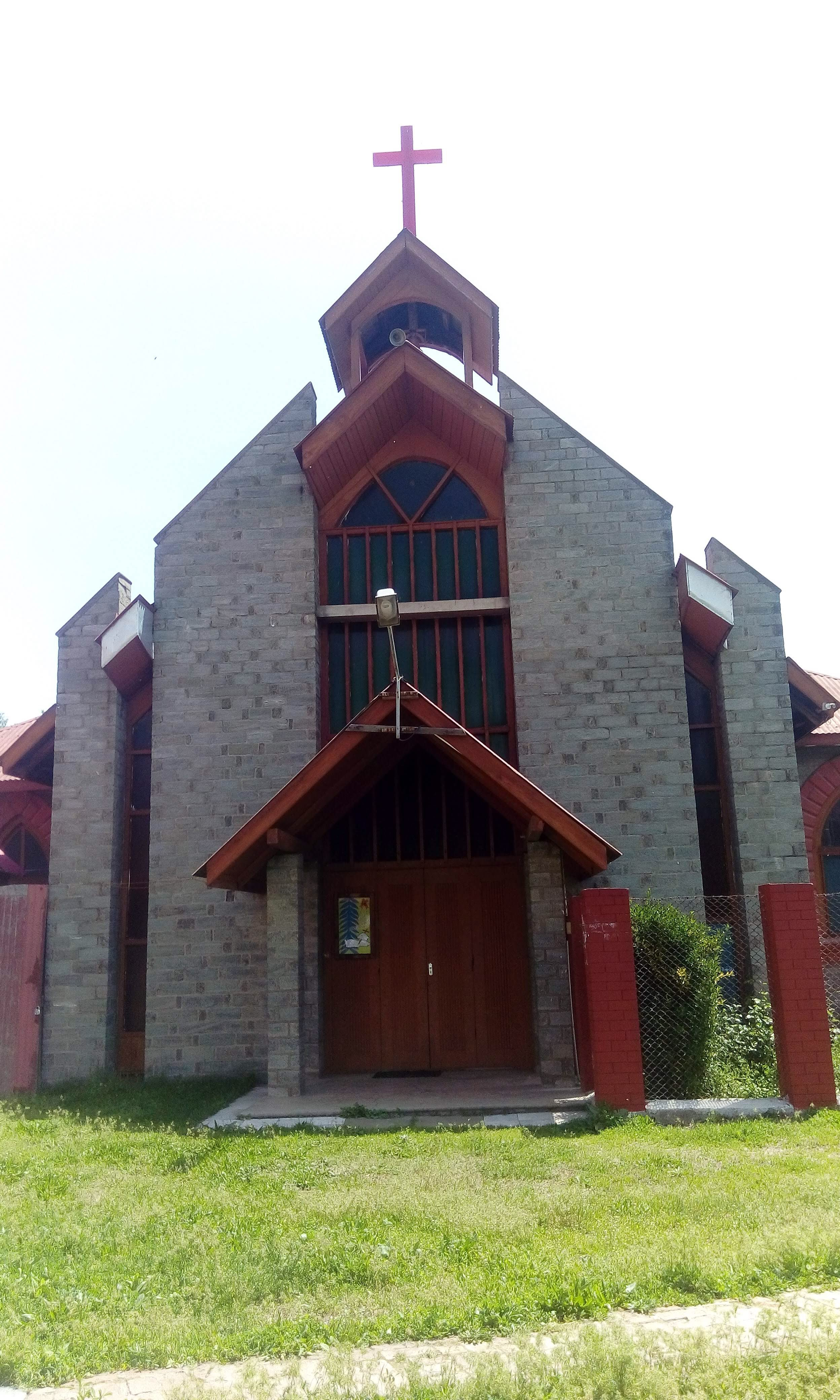
- St. Joseph Catholic Church, Baramulla 2
- St. Joseph's Catholic Church
- 34.203620°N 74.352078°E
- Location: Baramulla
- Country: India
- Denomination: Roman Catholic

History
- Status: Parish church
- Founded: 1891; 135 years ago
- Founder(s): Msgr. Ignatius Brouwer MHM; Mill Hill Missionaries
- Dedication: Saint Joseph

Architecture
- Functional status: Active
- Architectural type: Gothic Revival

Specifications
- Capacity: 500

Administration
- Archdiocese: Roman Catholic Archdiocese of Delhi
- Diocese: Roman Catholic Diocese of Jammu–Srinagar
- Parish: St. Joseph's Parish

Clergy
- Archbishop: Anil Joseph Thomas Couto
- Bishop: Ivan Pereira

St. Joseph's Catholic Church is a parish of the Roman Catholic Church in Baramulla, Jammu and Kashmir, India. It was established in 1891 by the Mill Hill Missionaries, making it the oldest Catholic church in Jammu and Kashmir, and currently belongs to the Jammu Srinagar Diocese. St. Joseph's Church, St. Joseph's Hospital and St. Joseph's School are located on the same campus as the parish church. It is the only church in the town, and there are only few Christian families in the community.

== History ==
St. Joseph's Church was started by Mill Hill Missionaries who came from the Apostolic Prefecture of Kafiristan and Kashmir, under the Diocese of Lahore. After their departure, the mission was cared for by the Capuchin Fathers, and later by the Society of Jesus. It is now part of the Diocese of Jammu Srinagar. Father Jim Borst MHM, a well-known missionary and former parish priest, died recently in Srinagar City.

The Catholic Encyclopedia of 1910 noted:

At Baramulla, in Kashmir, Father Simon, assisted by a staff of twelve lay teachers, conducts an important school for native Kashmir boys. The pupils number three hundred. The prefecture comprises about fifteen million inhabitants. Twelve million five hundred thousand of these are Mohammedans, two million are Hindus, five hundred thousand are Buddhists and about five thousand are Catholics.

In colonial India, the church was affiliated to the University of Lahore in 1919.

== Persecution of local Christians ==
In late October 1947, leading into the Kashmir Conflict of 1947, tribal invaders, mostly from colonial India's North West Frontier Province, now part of Pakistan, stormed Baramulla and attacked the church, school, and hospital, killing the Mother Superior and Assistant Mother Sister M. Teresalina Joaquina FMM.

Fr. Jim Borst MHM, who had been working in Jammu and Kashmir since 1963, including serving as the principal of St. Joseph's School, was given a Quit India Notice from Kashmir's Foreigners Registration Office in 2004.
