= Edmund Downes =

English medical missionary

Edmund Downes (1843–1912) was an English medical missionary in the 19th century who travelled to India on behalf of the Church Missionary Society. After attending Radley College, Downes was commissioned as a lieutenant in the Royal Horse Artillery. Following his deployment to India for 8 years, Downes decided to take up missionary work. Downes is best known for his contributions to the Mission Hospital in Drugjan, Rustum Garhi Hill in the state of Kashmir, where he established the surgical wing, constructed the first building of the mission hospital at the Drugjan hill, and worked to grow the hospital's size. Due to ill-health, Downes returned to England and pursued philanthropic work, notably presiding over his local branch of the YMCA.

== Early life ==
Downes was born to John Dr. Downes and Lucy Todd in Northampton, Middlesex, England on 14 April 1843. Downes grew up with 3 siblings: one elder brother named Lennard and 2 younger sisters, Bertha and Adela. His father worked as a reverend in Hannington Rectory, North Hampton. Downes was baptised in May of that year in Horton, Northamptonshire. Downes attended Radley College for 10 years and later Woolwich College.

== Personal life ==
Downes was commissioned as a lieutenant in the Royal House Artillery. After finding an in interest in medical missionaries, Downes studied medicine at St. Mary's Hospital where he received his MD in Brussels in 1876.

Downes married Mary Boughton Hill on 19 July 1875. The couple went on to have one child who they named John. Downes died at the age of 69 on 11 January 1912. Downes was buried at Oeklynge Cemetery in Eastborne, East Sussex on the southern coast of England.

== Mission ==
Downes worked in India for 8 years, then took up lay missionary work in 1873 with duties predominantly relating to advocacy for the Christian gospel within the country. In an interest to make more of an impact, Dr. Downes pursued a medical degree to qualify as a medical missionary in 1877.

The Kashmir Medical Mission was originally founded by William J. Elmslie in 1865. Elmslie was succeeded by Theodore Maxwell, and Downes continued the progression of the mission by first construction the mission's first buildings as the Mission Hospital in Drugjan. A ward was named in honour due this initial contribution. By 1881, 10800 new patients were treated, there were two 23,393 visits, and 1418 operations were performed.

In 1877, a famine hit Kashmir, and Downes and his team participated in relief work for the community in need, distributing food and digging a canal. Downes also took action to support the mentally ill of Kashmir, who were frequently overlooked with no job or home during this time. In 1881, Downes opened an asylum, built by the Kashmir government, which helped over 250 patients in its first year. Between 1877 and 1880, Downes, alongside Reverend Mr. Wade, opened an orphanage where over 150 children were taken care of.

=== Return ===
Due to ill health, Downes was forced to retire. A farewell meeting, presided by the British Political Officer on special duty in Kashmir, was held in his honour. Various addresses and testimonials were presented to him. Downes returned to England in 1877. After Downe's retirement, the Neve Family, specifically Arthur Neve, Ernest Neve, and Nora Neve, took over the mission. In 1884, Downes opened a medical practice in Eastbourne alongside Dr. Harper. In 1896, Downes was nominated as surgeon-captain of the local Church Lad's Brigade. Downes also held a commission in the Army Medical Reserve.

== Legacy ==
Downes's work in constructing the Kashmir Mission Hospital, mental asylum, and orphanage played a critical role in developing the Drugjan community. Upon his return, he became a leader in the Eastbourne community. Even after his retirement, missionaries continued to support the activities and service of the Kashmir Mission, growing the mission to support more and more patients in need.
