= Peat fire cancer =

- Specialty: Dermatology

Peat fire cancer is a cutaneous condition that may develop on the shins of women due to hydrocarbon-fueled heat exposure from coal-fired clothing warmers.

== See also ==
- Kangri ulcer
- Kairo cancer
- List of cutaneous conditions
