= Robert Thorpe (Indian Army officer) =

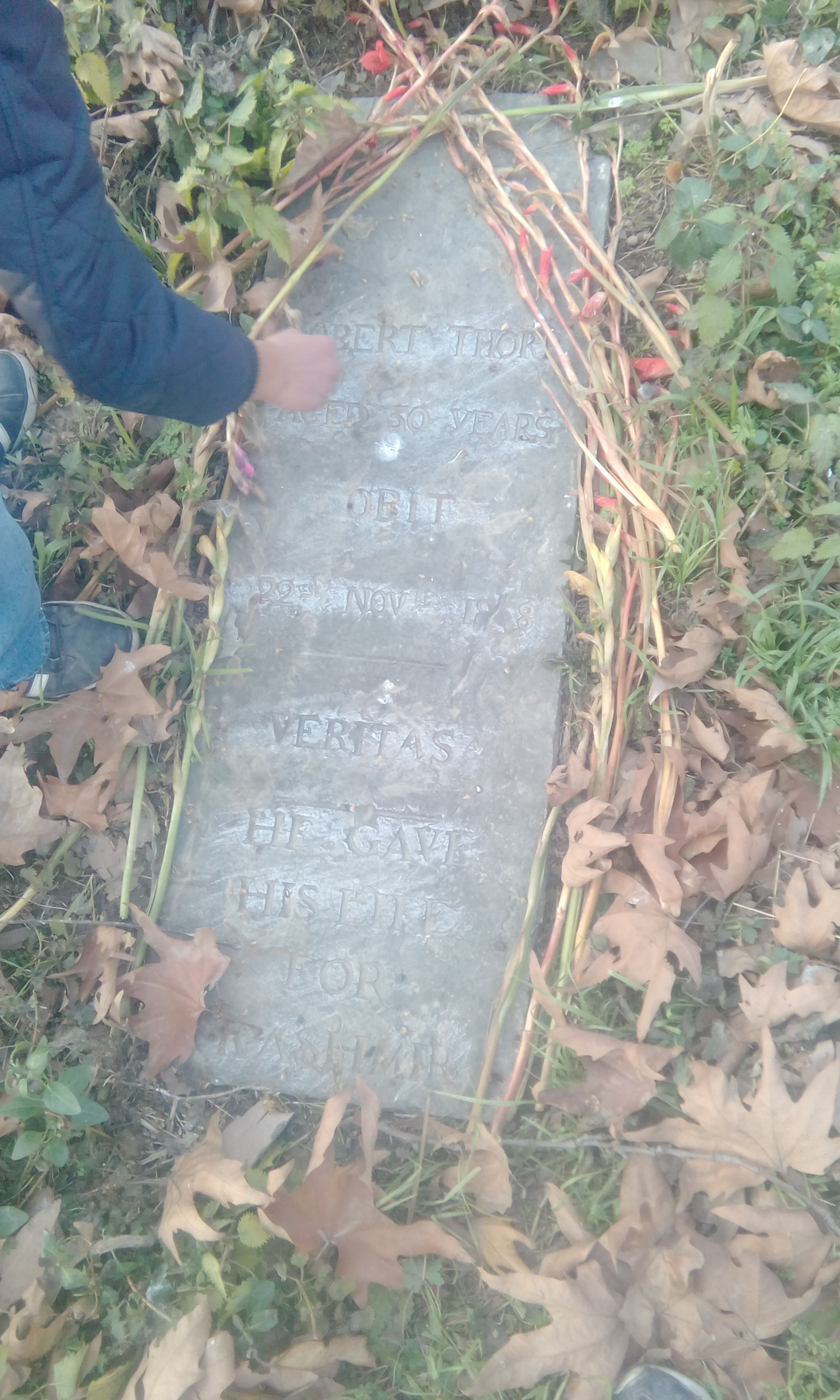
Gravestone of Lt. Robert Thorpe in Kashmir.

Lieutenant Robert Thorpe (1838–1868) was an officer of the British Indian Army. He visited Kashmir during the reign of Maharaja Ranbir Singh and wrote about the sufferings of the Kashmiri people. His writings were compiled into a book titled Cashmere Misgovernment which was later published posthumously in London in 1870. He also appealed to the British soldiers, who raised funds for Christian Missionary Society to send medical help to the Kashmir Valley. This eventually led to the founding of the British Mission Hospital in Srinagar.

Historians state that Thorpe's life is shrouded in "myth, memory and history". He is regarded in Kashmir as a martyr who died for the cause of Kashmiris.

== Family ==
According to Jane Strand, a surviving relative of Robert Thorpe, Robert Thorpe was born in 1838 to parents Thomas Thorp (died 1854), a solicitor in Alnwick in Northumberland, and Elizabeth Jane Tudor (died 1890) from Bath, Somerset. Robert had a brother William Tudor Thorp, who was a vicar and the great grandfather of Jane Strand.

== Life and career ==
According to Jane Strand's information, Robert went to school first in Durham and later in Charterhouse, London. He was commissioned in the 98th foot regiment of British Army in India (British Indian Army in modern terminology) in February 1858. He resigned from the Army in February 1867.

When Thorpe entered Kashmir around 1865, he was a Lieutenant. Scholar Sheikh Showkat Hussain believes that Thorpe was sent to Kashmir on a mission, to prepare the case for British intervention in Kashmir.

== Writings on Kashmir ==
Between 1865 and 1868, Thorpe travelled extensively in the villages, collecting information about the living conditions, economy, taxation, and the state apparatus. He wrote scathing articles on the Dogra rule in Anglo-Indian newspapers. He wrote to the British officials at Lahore (provincial capital of Punjab) and Calcutta (capital of British India). But his writings also contained a strong political message. He was advocating the British annexation of Kashmir, a prevailing view among the British officials at that time. His attack on the Dogra rulers and the Treaty of Amritsar that transferred Kashmir to the Dogras were scathing:

...by a government into whose hands British statesmen sold the people of Kashmir, by a government, therefore whose existence is a disgrace to the British name. It is at once a memorial of that foul act, when like the arch traitor of old; we battered innocent lives, which fate placed into our hands for a few pieces of silver.

His writings did not lead to annexation of Kashmir. However, the British government brought the state of Jammu and Kashmir into a subsidiary alliance, placing a British Resident in Kashmir.

Other than the political messages, scholars find Thorpe's writings valuable for the detailed information they provide on the state of the early Dogra administration. They describe the patterns of land tenure and revenue administration, the tax administration of the shawl industry, transport of supplies for troops and the system of begar (forced labour for the state). They bring to fore the "poverty, oppression and degradation" that characterised the early Dogra administration.

The writings were compiled into a book Cashemre Misgovernment published by Longmans, Green and Company in London in the year 1870. The book has been republished many times, two modern editions including those edited by S. N. Gadru and Fida Hassnain.

== Death ==
Thorpe died in Srinagar on 22 November 1868 under mysterious circumstances. The cause of death was determined by the British doctor Henry Cayley as a rupture of the heart. Poisoning was alleged and continues to be suspected even though the doctor ruled it out.

Cecil Tyndale-Biscoe, who went as a Christian missionary to Kashmir in 1890, informs us that prior to his death, Thorpe was ordered out of the state by the Maharaja. When he refused to leave, he was tied to his bed and carried to the pass. Thorpe is said to have escaped and returned to Srinagar. His death occurred the following day.

Fida Hassnain, on the other hand, states that the Maharaja's men attacked Thorpe when he went to the Shankaracharya Hill near the Dal Lake (also called the Takhat-i-Sulaiman), and he died on the spot. The source of this information is not specified.

Thorpe was buried at a Christian cemetery at Shaikh Bagh. The carving on the grave states, "He gave his life for Kashmir".

== Legacy ==
Robert Thorpe's appeals for help mobilised other British officers such as Sir Robert Montgomery, who was the Lieutenant-Governor of the Punjab, Sir Herbert Edwards, Colonel Martin and Colonel Urmston, who got together and raised funds for sending a medical missionary to Kashmir with the help of the Christian Missionary Society. Doctor William Jackson Elmslie went as a missionary doctor in 1864. His work is said to have been obstructed by the Maharaja's administration, but he continued until his death in 1872. Afterwards, the Society sent Doctor Theodore Maxwell who was able to get land from the administration for building a basic Mission Hospital at Rustum Gari, close to the Takhat-i-Sulaiman. Dr. Arthur Neve, who succeeded him, built the present hospital.

In 1967, Fida Hassnain wrote an article on Robert Thorpe in a local newspaper calling him "the first martyr" of Kashmir. Major Afzal arranged the first anniversary memorial at the grave of Robert Thorpe, and since then it is remembered every year.

== Bibliography ==
- Gadru, S. N., ed. (1973), Kashmir Papers: British Intervention in Kashmir (PDF), Freethought Literature Company
  - Teng, Mohan Kishen (1973), "Introduction", Ibid, p. xiii–
  - Brinckman, Arthur (1973) [first published 1868], "Wrongs of Cashmere", Ibid, pp. 1–46
  - Thorp, Robert (1973) [first published 1870], "Kashmir Misgovernment", Ibid, pp. 47–96
  - Digby, William (1973) [first published 1890], "Condemned Unheard", Ibid, pp. 97–304
- Hassnain, F. M., ed. (1980), Kashmir Misgovernment by Robert Thorpe, Gulshan Publishers
- Hussain, Sheikh Showkat (2017), Kashmir Profiles, Dar Al Kotob Al Ilmiyah, ISBN 978-2-7451-2195-0
- Kumar, Amit; Dar, Fayaz A. (26 September 2015), "Marginality and Historiography: The Case of Kashmir's History", Economic and Political Weekly, 50 (39): 37–44
- Peer, Basharat (2011), Curfewed Night, Random House Publishers India Pvt. Limited, ISBN 978-81-8400-223-2}
- Saraf, Muhammad Yusuf (2015) [first published 1977 by Ferozsons], Kashmiris Fight for Freedom, Volume 1, Mirpur: National Institute Kashmir Studies
- Tyndale-Biscoe, Cecil Earle (1925), Kashmir in Sunlight and Shade, Mittal Publications, GGKEY:BT1J7APQRW3
- Zutshi, Chitralekha (2004), Languages of Belonging: Islam, Regional Identity, and the Making of Kashmir, C. Hurst & Co. Publishers, ISBN 978-1-85065-700-2
