= Erythema ab igne =

Skin rash resulting from excess exposure to heat

- Other names: Fire stains, laptop thigh, granny's tartan, Koruda erythema, toasted skin syndrome
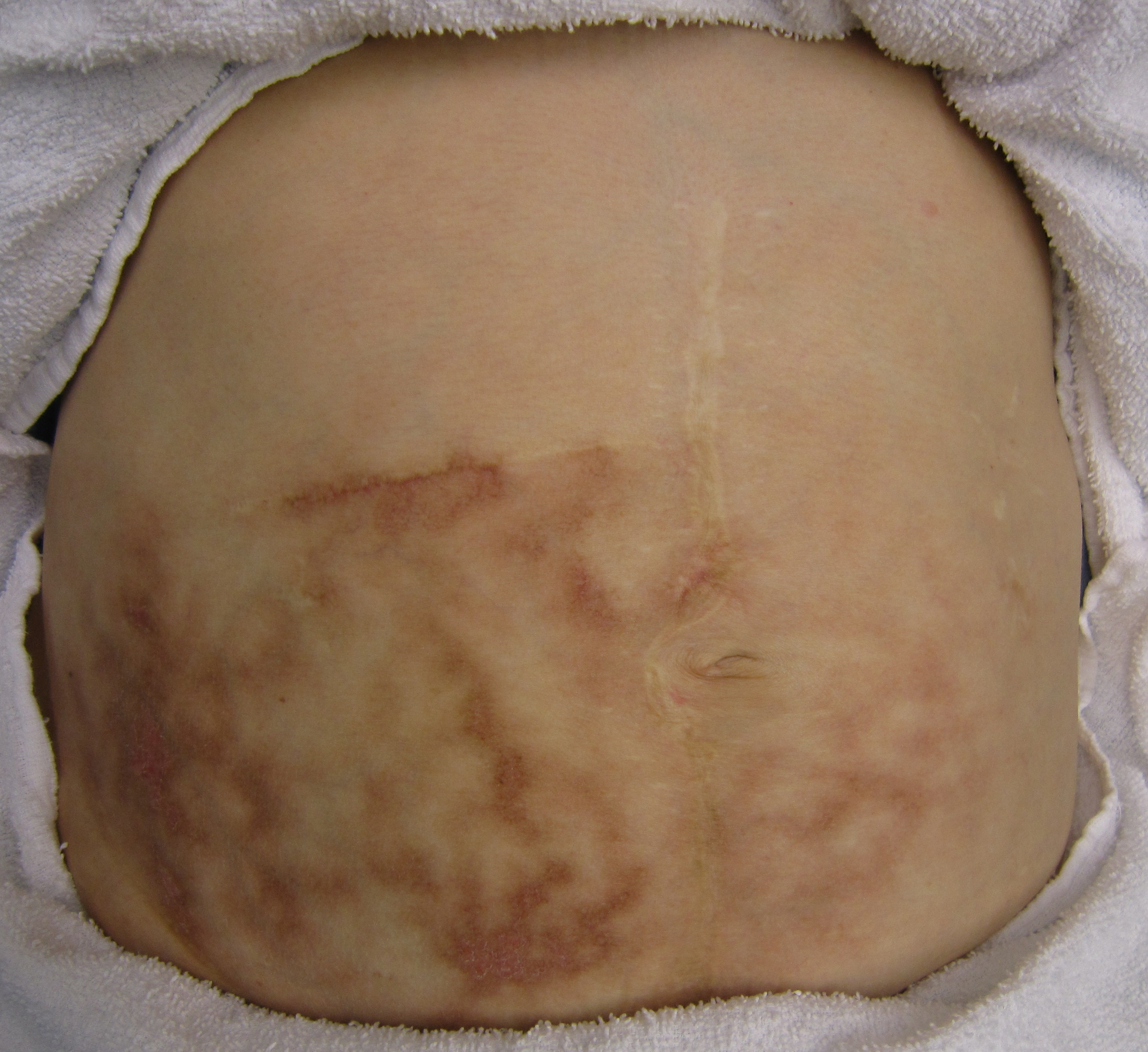
- Erythema ab igne in a person with chronic abdominal pain who found some relief from the application of heat
- Specialty: Dermatology

Erythema ab igne (Latin for 'redness from fire'), or EAI, also known as hot water bottle rash or toasted skin syndrome, is a skin condition caused by long-term exposure to heat (infrared radiation). Prolonged thermal radiation exposure of the skin can lead to the development of reticulated erythema, hyperpigmentation, scaling, and telangiectasias in the affected area. Some people may complain of mild itchiness and a burning sensation, but often, unless a change in pigmentation is seen, it can go unnoticed.

== Causes ==
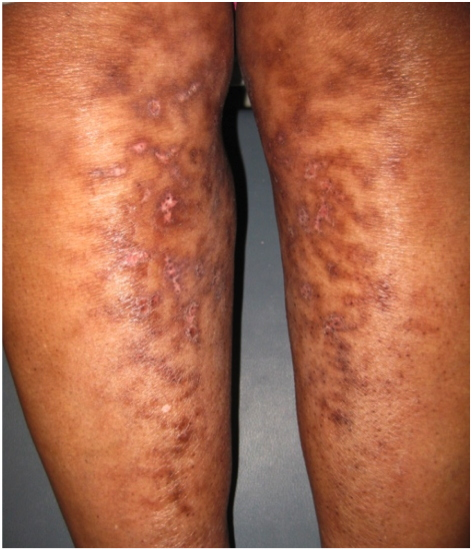
Reticulated, interlacing, hyperpigmented patches with a few, scattered, erythematous macules at junctions on the medial aspects of the lower legs

Different types of heat sources can cause this condition, such as:

- Repeated application of hot water bottles, heating blankets, or heat pads to treat chronic pain—e.g., chronic back pain.
- Repeated exposure to heated car seats, space heaters, or fireplaces. Repeated or prolonged exposure to a heater is a common cause of this condition in elderly individuals.
- Occupational hazards of silversmiths and jewelers (face exposed to heat), bakers, and chefs (arms, face)
- Resting a laptop computer on the thigh (laptop computer-induced erythema ab igne). In a 2012 review, Riahi and Cohen describe the characteristics of laptop computer-induced erythema ab igne. Temperatures between 43 and 47 °C can cause this skin condition; modern laptops can generate temperatures in this range. Indeed, laptops with powerful processors can reach temperatures of 50 °C when in operation and be associated with burns. Positioning the laptop on the thighs can allow for direct exposure to the heating elements of the laptop, which include the central processing unit (CPU) and the graphics processing unit (GPU). At least 15 cases have been reported by 2012 with the condition usually affecting the left anterior thigh. In these reports, 9 of the 15 patients were women (60%) with an average age of 25 years at diagnosis.
- In Kashmir, due to the use of a kanger, which also causes kangri cancer.
- It is a classic finding in chronic pancreatitis and may also be seen in people with hypothyroidism or lymphedema

== Pathogenesis ==
The pathogenesis of erythema ab igne remains unknown. It has been proposed that thermal radiation exposure can induce damage to superficial blood vessels that subsequently leads to epidermal vascular dilation. The dilation of vessels presents morphologically as the initially observed erythema. Red blood cell extravasation and deposition of hemosiderin that follows clinically appear as hyperpigmentation, which can occur in a reticular distribution. It has also been proposed that the distribution of affected blood vessels—predominantly in the superficial subcutaneous plexus (found in the papillary dermis)—results in the net-like pattern of erythema ab igne skin lesions.

== Treatment ==
Discontinuing contact with the heat source is the initial treatment of erythema ab igne. If the area is only mildly affected, with slight redness, the condition may resolve after a few months. If the condition is severe and the skin pigmented and atrophic, then it is unlikely to resolve. In this case, there is a possibility that a squamous cell carcinoma, or a neuroendocrine carcinoma, such as a Merkel cell carcinoma, may form. If there is a persistent sore that does not heal or a growing lump within the rash, a skin biopsy should be performed to rule out the possibility of skin cancer. If the erythema ab igne lesions demonstrate pre-cancerous changes, the use of 5-fluorouracil cream has been recommended. Abnormally pigmented skin may persist for years. Treatment with topical tretinoin or laser treatment may improve the appearance.

== Epidemiology ==
Erythema ab igne was once commonly seen in the elderly who stood or sat closely to open fires or electric heaters; however, erythema ab igne has been reported in both young and elderly individuals. Women have a higher incidence of erythema ab igne than men. Although wide use of central heating has reduced the overall incidence of erythema ab igne, it is still sometimes found in people exposed to heat from other sources, such as heating pads, space heaters, hot water bottles, and electronic devices.

== See also ==
- Livedo reticularis
- Miliaria
- Vasculitis
