= Ernest Neve =

British surgeon

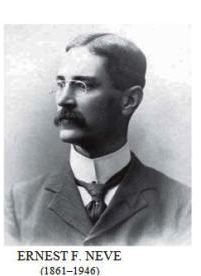
- Born: 3 February 1861; Brighton, Sussex, England
- Died: 6 February 1946 (aged 85); Srinagar, Kashmir, India
- Education: University of Edinburgh
- Occupations: Medical Missionary and Surgeon

Ernest Frederic Neve (1861-1946) was a British surgeon, Christian medical missionary, and author who provided medical care to the people of Kashmir and pioneered work on Kangri cancer. He established the Kashmir Mission Hospital and the Kashmir State Leper Hospital with his brother Arthur Neve and made significant contributions to the healthcare facilities in Kashmir throughout the over 50 years that he spent there.

== Background ==
=== Early life ===
Ernest Frederic Neve was born on 3 February 1861 in Brighton, Sussex, England to David Neve, a silk mercer, and Mary Jane Neve (born Wibmer). He was the fourth son and youngest child of seven. He had an older brother, Arthur Neve (1858-1919), who was two years older and worked with him in Kashmir. The Neve brothers also inspired Nora Neve, their niece, to join them in Kashmir in 1898. In 1915, Ernest Neve married Jean Sophia Browne and did not have children.

=== Education ===
He attended the Brighton Grammar School, now known as the Brighton, Hove & Sussex Sixth Form College. After spending two years in Germany, he entered the University of Edinburgh in 1879. He began medical training in 1882 and was heavily influenced by his brother Arthur Neve who had already dedicated himself to missionary work in Kashmir. Ernest Neve spent the next three years preparing for a missionary career by taking the post of resident house officer at the Livingstone Memorial Training Institution under the Edinburgh Medical Missionary Society where students are specially trained for medical missionary work abroad. Following in his brother's footsteps, he lived among the poorest districts in Edinburgh and attended to the sick there, allowing him to gain unique experience.

During this time, Ernest Neve also served as the demonstrator in anatomy at the Medical School, senior assistant in the pathological department, and senior ophthalmic assistant at the Royal Infirmary of Edinburgh. In 1886, he obtained his M.D. and was awarded the gold medal and the Goodsir prize.

== Medical missionary work ==
In 1886, Ernest Neve joined his brother in Srinagar, Kashmir working at the Church Missionary Society's Hospital as a part of the Kashmir Medical Mission. He continued the work of his predecessors Dr. William Jackson Elmsie, Dr. Theodore Maxwell, and Dr. Edmond Downes.

=== The Kashmir Mission Hospital ===
The Neve brothers converted the dispensary at Soloman Hill from a line of mud huts into a modernized hospital. Ernest Neve served as a surgeon at the hospital and became consulting surgeon in 1923. The Kashmir Mission Hospital opened in 1888 with 80 beds and grew to 135 beds in 1893. By then, the hospital had treated 20,606 patients, including 853 inpatients and performed 2,589 operations. Many other British physicians, surgeons and nurses joined, especially during the peak periods. The staff that joined included Dr. Cecil Vosper, Dr. M. R. Roche and three English nurses, Nora Neve, Lucy McCormick and H. Smith. In addition, the new maharaja, Pratap Singh, was very impressed with the Mission Hospital work and gave annual donations and visited the hospital often. In the ten years between 1918 and 1928, 166,000 new out-patients were treated and more than 46,699 surgical operations were performed.

=== The Kashmir State Leper Hospital ===
In 1891, Ernest and Arthur Neve established the Kashmir State Leper Hospital which was dedicated to treating leprosy patients, and Ernest was the hospital's honorary superintendent for many years. This hospital was funded by the Maharaja and was built on a piece of land granted by the British Commander-in-Chief of the Kashmir Army. The hospital was surrounded on three sides by the blue waters of the Dal Lake and stretches of lotus blossoms. In the first year, there were twenty patients and thirty beds. Soon in 1894, a new building was erected to hold eight more beds. The hospital continued to expand and by 1917, the average daily number of patients was 110.

The patients with leprosy arrived at the hospital to isolate voluntarily, and did not face compulsory segregation. They were given a liberal diet and a very small weekly allowance of pocket-money. In 1920, there were 208 patients in the hospital, and in the following years, a separate hospital ward for children was built. This Children's Home housed healthy children of leprosy patients in an effort to separate them from their parents before they contracted the disease.

Ernest Neve published many articles and papers on leprosy in the British Medical Journal. He visited several districts where leprosy was endemic and analyzed leprosy cases in Kashmir, which helped him identify possible sources of contagion. He determined that the most important measures to prevent leprosy included proper sanitary precautions such as disinfecting dirty clothes by heat before washing, maintaining open ventilation and exposure to sunlight in buildings, and properly disposing of dangerous refuse.

In 2013, there were just over 100 patients in the hospital which the government operated as a Leper Colony. A mosque had been added to the grounds. In 2018, the patient population had declined to 35 all of whom were elderly as the disease was eradicated from the state.

=== Tuberculosis treatment and prevention ===
Ernest Neve also dedicated much of his time to the treatment and prevention of tuberculosis. This infectious disease was becoming increasingly prevalent in Kashmir with a high mortality rate. Deaths in childbirth and deaths from tuberculosis were very high and sometimes topped the list of fatalities in Srinagar. Recognizing that tuberculosis and leprosy are preventable through proper sanitary measures, he made recommendations in 1912 to the Home minister of the State Council. These recommendations were supported by the British Superintending Surgeon of the Kashmir State Medical Service, but nothing effective was done.

In an article published in the Indian Medical Gazette, Neve shared his success with the surgical treatment of glandular tuberculosis. He estimated that 75 percent of their 3,000 cases treated through surgery were cured while only 0.5 percent died from the operation, thus recommending other surgeons to treat glandular tuberculosis through surgery.

=== Cholera epidemics ===
In twenty years there were five serious cholera epidemics with at least forty thousand deaths. The fatal years were 1888, 1892, 1900, 1907 and 1910. The Neve brothers traced the epidemic sources and are remembered for visiting all the cholera impacted districts in 1888. The introduction of a supply of pure water and better sanitary measures helped save hundreds of lives in Srinagar. Despite this, cholera still spread rapidly, especially in crowded and unsanitary environments.

In the spring of 1907, there was an epidemic of cholera with appalling mortality. Entire families were wiped out and the village official who reported the cases had died. Neve observed that superstition was a major contributor to the spread. The Mohammedan priests proclaimed that to avert the pestilence, the tank in the courtyard of the sacred edifice should be filled with water brought by the worshippers. Hundreds of people came with a pot of water and emptied it into the tank. Some of the water was then consumed as a prevention against cholera. Unfortunately, the water was infected, and a disastrous outbreak of cholera followed.

=== Vaccine introduction ===
In 1894, Ernest and Arthur Neve introduced cholera and smallpox vaccines to Kashmir. The vaccine greatly benefited the infant population since almost all children contracted smallpox and fifty percent died in infancy. In addition, smallpox frequently caused incurable blindness. Those who were vaccinated, however, lived safely even in the midst of infection. For instance, there were no cases of smallpox among the children of native Christians in the Medical Mission who were all vaccinated.

=== Kangri-burn cancer treatment ===
Following Dr. William Elmslie's observation that Kangri-burn cancer was caused by constant irritation from the fire-baskets that people carried under their clothes, Ernest Neve pioneered surgical treatments for the cancer. Ernest tested the temperature to which the skin was exposed and found that it ranged between 150 °F to 200 °F. This led him to conclude that the heat was the primary factor in the causation of the cancer. From 1880 to 1930, more than 2,650 operations for epithelioma were performed in the Kashmir Mission Hospital and approximately 80 percent of the operations were for Kangri-burn cancer. In 1923, Ernest Neve reported the results of his success with the surgical treatment of Kangri-burn cancer in the British Medical Journal. He also published many articles and papers about the causes of and treatments for Kangri-burn cancer, including detailed descriptions of the operation. Some of his notable articles on this topic include "One Cause of Cancer as Illustrated by Epithelioma in Kashmir" and "Kangri-Burn Cancer" which were published in the British Medical Journal, as well as "Squamous-Celled Epithelioma due to Kangri Burn" and "The Causation of Cancer with Special Reference to Endocrine Influence" which were published in The Indian Medical Gazette.

== Publications ==
In addition to articles about Kangri-burn cancer, Ernest Neve also published many articles about cataract extraction, Caesarean sections, and bone operations.

He wrote several books, including Beyond the Pir Panjal: Life Among the Mountains and Valleys of Kashmir (1912); Beyond the Pir Panjal: life and missionary enterprise in Kashmir (1914); A Crusader in Kashmir (1928), the story of Arthur Neve's life and work; English-Kashmiri: A Vocabulary of the Kashmiri Language (1973); and Things Seen in Kashmir (1931).

== Other activities and awards ==
During World War 1 from 1914 to 1918, Ernest Neve served in the army as the captain of the Indian Defense Force Medical Corps. He was awarded the Kaisar-I-Hind Gold Medal, first class, in 1918 for his public service.

He received the Gunning-Lister Prize in Surgery of Edinburgh University in 1888, and was elected a Fellow of the Royal College of Surgeons of England, as a member of twenty years' standing, in 1931. He was a member of the British Medical Association for 50 years and served as the president of the Kashmir Medical Association. He was also elected vice-president of the Church Missionary Society.

=== Mountaineering ===
Ernest was a leading mountaineer and founding member of the Himalayan Club. He made the first ascents of Mount Kolahoi (17,839 feet) in 1912 and Mount Tatticooti (15,560 feet) in 1901. Along with his brother, Ernest also climbed various other Kashmiri peaks such as Sunset Peak', Rajdain, and Sachkach.

== Death and legacy ==
Ernest Neve retired from medical work in 1934 but continued to live at Sonawar Bagh, Srinagar, where he died on 6 February 1946, aged 85.

He fully immersed himself in his work and devoted his life to medical service in Kashmir. His love for the country is shown through his extensive writings about Kashmir's culture, language, and beauty. He made lasting impacts on Kashmir's healthcare system by building hospitals and introducing modern medicine to Kashmir. He also made significant contributions to the medical community and published new findings on a wide variety of surgical topics.
