= Muhammad Ashraf Bukhari =

Indian senior administrator

- Born: 20 March 1956 (age 70); Rangwar Baramulla
- Citizenship: India
- Education: St. Joseph's School (Baramulla)
- Occupation: Civil Servant
- Employer: Government of Jammu and Kashmir
- Awards: Award for Outstanding Performance

Muhammad Ashraf Bukhari (Kashmiri: مُحمد اشرف بُخاری), also known as Syed Muhammad Ashraf Bukhari (born 20 March 1956) is a former Indian Administrative Service officer of the Jammu and Kashmir cadre who was last posted as the chairman of the prestigious Board of professional entrance examinationJ&K Ashraf Bukhari has also served as Commissioner/Secretary, Agriculture Production Department Jammu and Kashmir. and is the longest served Commissioner/Secretary to the government GAD for as long as two years.

== Early life and education ==
Ashraf Bukhari was born on 20 March 1956 in Rangwar area of Baramulla Town, of the Jammu and Kashmir state. He is an alumnus of the St. Joseph's School (Baramulla). He is a post graduate and also holds a M.Phil. degree in economics. He is the son of noted Islamic Scholar of North Kashmir, Maulana Syed Muhammad Yahya Shah Bukhari.

== Career ==
Muhammad Ashraf Bukhari is a former senior bureaucrat of Jammu and Kashmir state, who has served at various positions in the state bureaucracy including the prestigious position of Commissioner/Secretary General Administration Department. Director General, Institute of Management, Public Administration & Rural Development, J&K. Secretary Jammu and Kashmir public service commission. Mohammad Ashraf Bukhari has also served as the Director, Rural development department and Secretary, Animal and Sheep Husbandry department, Jammu and Kashmir and various other departments like Home and forest. He was awarded as the most outstanding performer award by Ghulam Nabi Azad Government in the year 2007.
