= Bob Thorpe =

Bob Thorpe can refer to:

- Bob Thorpe (outfielder) (1926–1996), American baseball player
- Bob Thorpe (pitcher) (1935–1960), American baseball player
- Bob Thorpe (politician), American politician and representative in the Arizona House of Representatives

== See also ==
- Robert Thorpe (disambiguation)
