= William Jackson Elmslie =

Scottish Presbyterian doctor (1832–1872)

William Jackson Elmslie (29 June 1832 – 18 November 1872) was a Scottish Presbyterian doctor working primarily in Kashmir and the Punjab region in India from 1865 to 1872. Sponsored by the Church Missionary Society, Elmslie established Kashmir's first dispensary in Srinagar and later founded a small temporary hospital.

== Early life ==
=== Personal life ===
Elmslie was born in Aberdeen, Scotland on 29 June 1832 to James and Barbara Elmslie. At the age of nine, Elmslie began learning boot closing, his father's trade, which he continued throughout his university years.

Between trips to India, on 23 February 1872, Elmslie married Margaret Duncan, the daughter of a Scottish reverend. Following his sudden death a few months after their marriage, Margaret Duncan Elmslie worked in various orphanages in Amritsar, India until 1878.

Elmslie learned Kashmiri, Persian, and Sanskrit.

=== Education ===
In 1848, Elmslie joined the Grammar School of Aberdeen. Five years later, in 1853, he entered King's College, Aberdeen, where he pursued, but never received, a degree in arts due to two failed final exams.

Sponsored by the Edinburgh Medical Missionary Society, Elmslie received medical training from the University of Edinburgh from 1862 to 1864 His MD thesis was entitled "The regular dislocations of the hip joint."

In 1858, Elmslie also joined Free Church Divinity College, where he decided to become a medical missionary.

== Missionary work ==
=== Church Missionary Society ===
In 1864, Elmslie was recruited by the Church Missionary Society (CMS) through the Edinburgh Medical Missionary Society, which had sponsored his medical training at the University of Edinburgh. Although Elmslie's Presbyterian beliefs did not align with CMS's mainly evangelical Anglican Clapham Sect-leaning beliefs, his connections in CMS persuaded the organization to make an exception for Elmslie. Elmslie received a 5-year position at CMS and was assigned to work in Srinagar, Kashmir. His communication with William Thomson helped develop and fund the Kashmir Medical Mission through a feature in the Medical Missionary Journal.

=== Work in Kashmir ===
Due to Kashmir's ruler Maharaja Ranbir Singh’s visa restrictions prohibiting foreigners from staying in Kashmir in the winter, Elmslie's work in Kashmir was limited to just the summers of 1865, 1866, 1867, 1868, 1869, and 1872.

Elmslie first arrived in Srinagar on 4 May 1865. Five days later, he opened Kashmir's first dispensary, later named Amira Kadal Mission Dispensary. By the end of the month, 53 patients had visited the dispensary. By August, the dispensary received approximately 90 patients a day. With this growth, Elmslie began a small hospital as well.

In the summer of 1866, upon finding his old location occupied, Elmslie moved his dispensary to the European Quarters in Munshi Bagh, where it remained in later years. In addition his usual medical work, Elmslie taught medical classes to locals and ophthalmic surgery to the local doctor.

In the summer of 1867, Elmslie encountered significant opposition from the local government and patient visitations decreased drastically. A major cholera outbreak also occurred this summer, starting in June and lasting until August.

The following summer, government obstruction gave way and the number of patients increased greatly. In July and August, about 2,000 total patients visited the dispensary. The next year, in 1869, this number further increased to 3,902 patients.

In the summer of 1872, Elmslie returned to Srinagar alongside his newlywed wife. From 6 May to 25 October, over 3,000 patients visited the dispensary.

Throughout his time in Kashmir, Elmslie treated a variety of medical conditions such as abdominal aortic aneurysms, nasal polyps, tuberculosis, and breast cancer. He was also a skilled surgeon, successfully removing cysts, tumors, and bladder stones and performing a wrist joint resection.

=== Work in Amritsar ===
Between summers in Kashmir, Elmslie traveled to Amritsar, India in the Punjab region to continue his missionary work.

With the assistance of a native doctor and 4 assistants, Elmslie began a dispensary in Amritsar. He found the local government less amenable to his work than he hoped, yet patient visits increased every year. Similar to his work in Kashmir, Elmslie taught medicine, anatomy, and chemistry classes to local students in Amritsar.

=== Missionaries impacted ===
Although Elmslie was unable to establish a permanent year-round dispensary in Kashmir due to visa restrictions, his work eased the path for his successors, including Drs. Theodore Maxwell, Edmund Downes, Arthur Neve, and Ernest Neve. Elmslie's familiarity with the local Kashmiri people and government, and vice versa, allowed future medical missionaries to more easily establish permanent dispensaries and hospitals.

== Death ==
In his later years, Elmslie suffered from poor health, including liver disease. While leaving Srinagar for Amritsar due to Maharaja Ranbir Singh's orders, an already ill Elmslie became trapped in snow. He did not recover from this incident and died on 18 November 1872 in Gujrat, Pakistan.

== Evangelical work ==
Elmslie was a deeply religious man, regularly preaching evangelical Christianity to his Muslim-majority patients. Elmslie was a firm believer in the Biblical verse “Heal the sick that are therein, and say unto them, the kingdom of God is come nigh unto you.” Before every consultation, he gave a sermon, which was then repeated aloud in Kashmiri by a local catechist.

Upon arriving a new village, Elmslie would make connections with local leaders and begin his evangelical work by speaking of the “Injil” and “Isa Masih,” the Gospel and Jesus in Kashmiri, respectively. Elmslie eventually became known to the locals as “Padre Doctor Sahib.”

== Legacy ==
Elmslie established the first dispensary in Kashmir. His dispensary was only temporary, but it laid the groundwork for future missionaries, particularly Drs. Theodore Maxwell, Arthur Neve, and Ernest Neve.

In his paper “Scheme for Training Native Medical Missionary Evangelists,” which he presented at a CMS conference in Amrtisar in 1866, Elmslie argued for need to train Christian Indians in both medical and evangelical work. He also promoted the role of female medical missionaries, particularly newly converted Christian Indian women, in spreading Christianity through medical work.

Elmslie also proposed a mechanism for Kangri cancer in his paper “Etiology of epithelioma among Kashmiris.”

In 1872, Elmslie published the first ever Kashmiri-English dictionary, A Vocabulary of the Kashmiri Language.
