= Kangri ulcer =

- Specialty: Dermatology

Kangri ulcers are a cutaneous condition prevalent among the poorer classes of Kashmir, and a consequence of wearing warm embers. It is unique to this area and may progress to Kangri cancer.

== See also ==
- Marjolin's ulcer
- Peat fire cancer
