= María Teresalina Sánchez =

Spanish Franciscan religious sister

María Teresalina Sánchez FMM
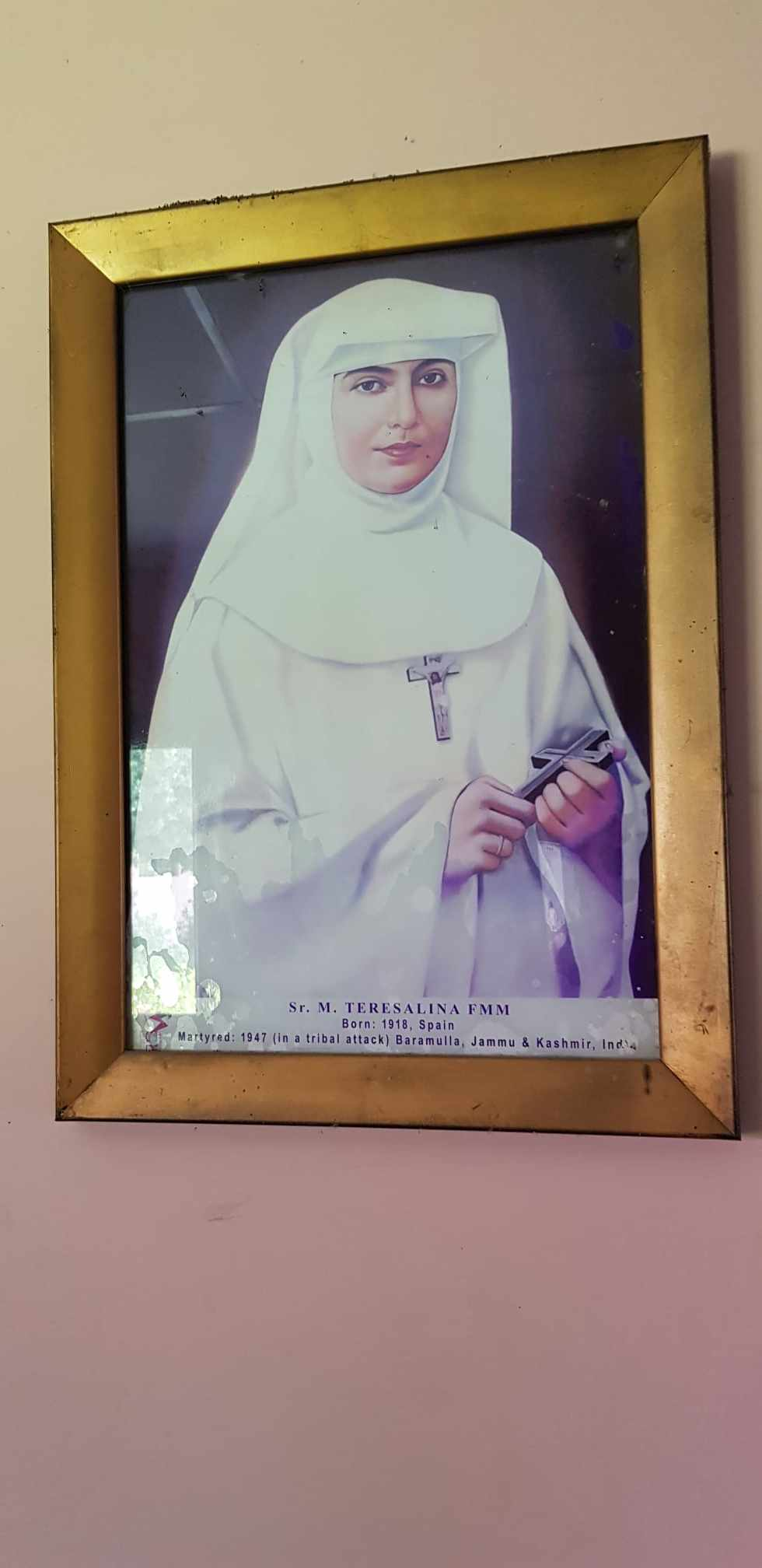
- María Teresalina Sánchez
- Born: Joaquina de Z. Sánchez; 13 June 1918; Sondika, Biscay, Spain
- Died: 27 October 1947 (aged 29); Baramulla, Kashmir, India
- Resting place: St. Joseph's Catholic Church, Kashmir, India

María Teresalina Sánchez, FMM, born as Joaquina de Zubiri Sánchez, (13 June 1918 – 27 October 1947) was a Spanish religious sister of the Franciscan Missionaries of Mary who served in Kashmir. She was murdered on the grounds of St. Joseph's Catholic Church in Baramulla by invading tribesmen during the Indo-Pakistani War of 1947. She is considered the first martyr in Jammu and Kashmir.

== Early life ==
Sánchez was born on 13 June 1918, in the village of Sondika, Biscay, called Bidegain, into a family of seventeen children. While still an infant, her parents entrusted her upbringing to a community of the Daughters of the Cross in Bilbao. At eleven years of age she became a boarder in the teaching college in Orduña run by the Sisters of the Company of Mary, Our Lady, where she volunteered until the end of her studies at the Missionary Center of Bilbao. In 1936, at the age of 18, she thought of becoming a Carmelite nun, but doing so was impossible due to the Spanish Civil War then raging in Spain. She then began to work as a nurse in the municipal hospital of Bilbao, but in May 1937 she went into exile with her family as a result of the fight, settling in Cambo-les-Bains in southern France.

While there, Sánchez came to know the Franciscan Missionaries of Mary, a religious congregation founded in India. After having read the biography of a member of the congregation, Maria Assunta Pallotta, who had died in China at age 27 while nursing the sick during an outbreak of typhus, she decided to enter the congregation. Due to the illness and death of her father and other circumstances, however, she did not enter until 1940, after the family returned to Spain, where she was admitted as a candidate at the convent in Pamplona. At her admission to the novitiate of the congregation, she was given the religious name Maria Teresalina.

== Missionary life ==
Through years of religious formation and work on her nursing skills, she was preparing herself for mission work. For this she prayed that she might be like a sponge from which one could squeeze "even the last drop". After her perpetual vows, she was sent to the overseas missions with 44 other Spanish Franciscan Missionaries of Mary.

The group left for Kashmir on 16 April 1947 and arrived at the mission of Baramulla about 9 August 1947. Their base of operations was a convent attached to a hospital. Sánchez began her health ministry serving the poor of the community. She provided healthcare to the local people and visited the homebound in the community. During this time she began to study English, Urdu, and Kashmiri. She thrived in this situation, and was quickly appointed as the Assistant Superior.

== Martyrdom ==
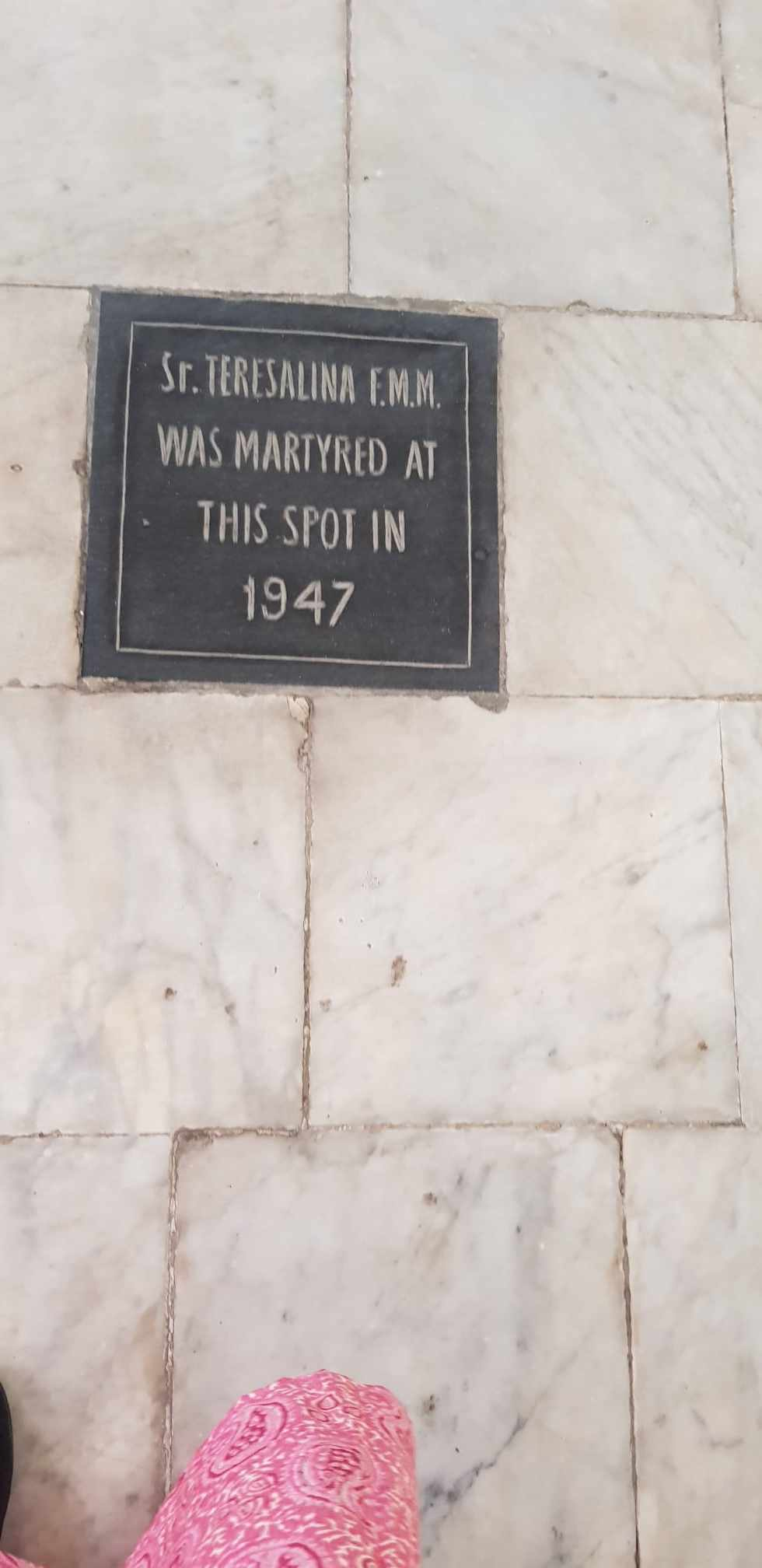
The spot in the convent where Maria Teresalina Sánchez was martyred

Shortly after their arrival, the sisters found themselves in the middle of the Kashmir conflict: both India and Pakistan wanted possession of Kashmir because of its strategic position. Although a neutrality pact was in effect, Pakistan invaded the region anyway. The mission compound became a sanctuary for hordes of refugees fleeing the violence. Tribesmen from Northern Frontier, (what is today known as Khyber Pakhtunkhwa) took advantage of the situation and attacked, wrecking everything on their passage. While heading to Srinigar, they attacked Baramulla, which was on the route to that city, where they looted the church and convent, stealing everything that appeared to be valuable. They went to the hospital and began to destroy everything inside, whereupon they met the Mother Superior. The mercenaries pulled off her eyeglasses, ring, and veil. Sánchez interceded, speaking up for her superior. At that moment the mercenaries shouted: "Kill them!" She put herself in front of the superior to defend her and received three bullet wounds. The shots hit her in the lung, abdomen, and leg. The mercenaries then dragged her to a room in the hospital that had already been sacked.

While the mercenaries prepared to kill the others, Sehrab Hayat Khan, the head of Afridi tribesman contingent, arrived and issued a counter-order, to which the mercenaries revolted. They aimed their rifles towards him saying to lay off or he will be killed. Sehrab khan had been educated in a Catholic college led by the Presentation Sisters in Peshawar and then Bishop Cotton School, Shimla (he explained that he was "not likely to forget their kindness"). In the meanwhile the Afridi contingent arrives and seeing their head of contingent at gunpoint they immediately surrounded the mercenaries, to which they surrendered. Khan saw what he considered a great mistake, he asked pardon of the sisters. Khan along with his tribseman and other sisters went to save the others.

As there was no possibility of attending to the wounded, the community of sisters surrounded Sánchez, who was quickly losing blood. Her wounds were very serious and it was not possible to save her. she endured a long agony of ten hours, losing blood "until the last drop" as her motto had stated, in acute pain that could not be alleviated due to a lack of sedatives. She only asked for help occasionally when the pain moved nearer, from her leg to her stomach. Her last words were: "It is already ended… I offer my life for the conversion of Kashmir". Two days later she received Christian burial in a grave dug in the convent garden, with no coffin.

== Legacy ==
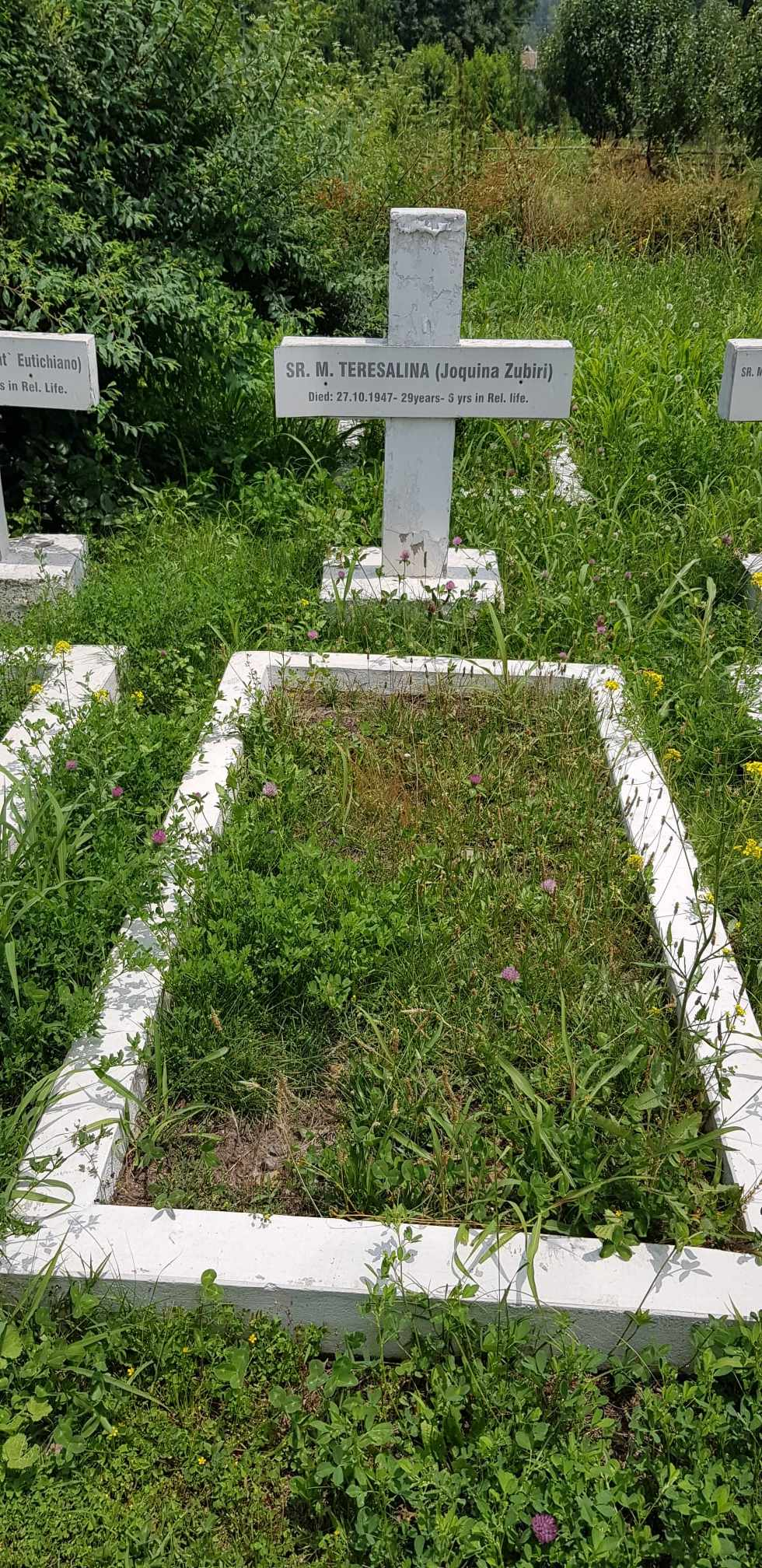
Maria Teresalina Sánchez's grave in the convent cemetery

Besides Sánchez, five other people were killed by the tribesmen, both staff and patients, including a British officer and his wife, who was in labor at the time. The sacking of the Catholic mission was extensively reported in the Western press. News articles suggested that rape had taken place. The government of India publicised the attack along with its war with Pakistan. Soon after this, the Pakistani tribes were evicted from Baramulla and Prime Minister Jawaharlal Nehru himself visited the town.

Her remains are now buried in the convent cemetery of the mission. There have been repeated requests by the sisters at Baramulla that Mother Teresalina should be considered for canonisation.

== See also ==
- Sack of Baramulla
- 1947 Jammu massacres
- Indo-Pakistani war of 1947-1948
- St. Joseph's Catholic Church
