= Theodore Maxwell =

19th century English doctor and missionary

Theodore Maxwell, MD (1847-1914) was an English doctor medical missionary, founder of the Kashmir Mission Hospital, and published author. Maxwell left England for Kashmir shortly after receiving his MB from King's College, Cambridge, and serving as a physician in Addenbrooke's Hospital. His arrival in Srinagar, Kashmir, succeeded four years of missionary work by Dr. William Jackson Elmslie. Maxwell founded a new hospital in Srinagar and laid the foundations for the work of his successors, including the establishment of the Kashmir Mission Hospital. After leaving missionary work, Maxwell wrote numerous papers for The Lancet and compiled important medical knowledge to write Terminologia Medica Polyglotta: A Concise International Dictionary of Medical Terms.

== Background ==
=== Early life ===
Theodore Maxwell was born in 1847 and baptised on 6 May 1847 at St. John the Baptist Church in Yorkshire, England. His parents were Reverend Edward Maxwell and Mary Hogg Maxwell. His mother, Mary Hogg Maxwell, was sister to General John Nicholson, which provided Theodore with an important connection later in his life.

=== Education ===
Maxwell attended Felstead Grammar School as a boy and later attended a private school in Enfield. He then pursued an extensive professional education in the science field. He received a Bachelor of Science degree from University College in London in 1868. Maxwell went on to attend King's College, Cambridge, where he received his Bachelor of Arts degree in 1870, his Bachelor of Medicine degree in 1872, and his Doctor of Medicine degree in 1876. In 1882 he became a Doctor of Public Health, and in 1873 he became a Fellow of the Royal College of Surgeons in Edinburgh and a Fellow of the Chemical Society.

=== Family ===
Theodore Maxwell married Elizabeth Eyre Ashley, the daughter of his former school teacher, on 9 September 1873. After their arrival in India, his wife became pregnant. Their son, Arnold A. Maxwell, was born in Lahore on 5 November 1874.

== Medical missionary work ==
=== Journey ===
Maxwell worked in Addenbrooke's Hospital as a house-physician until he became interested in medical missionary work. The death of Dr. William Jackson Elmslie in late 1872 left the Kashmir Mission desperate for a new missionary to take his place. When the Church Mission Society asked Maxwell to step up, he eagerly did so. After marrying his wife in late 1873, they left for Kashmir in early 1874.

=== Service ===
Maxwell's arrival in Kashmir reestablished the mission after an almost two-year absence. He opened a dispensary in May 1874 but it was clear that more was needed. Maxwell rented a nearby native hut, where he saw hundreds of native patients each day. He soon felt the need for a new hospital in the Kashmir Medical Mission. He began this task with very little resistance from Kashmir natives. His deceased uncle, General John Nicholson, was instrumental in establishing the role of Maharajah, the British-installed ruler of the Princely State of Jammu and Kashmir, during the First Anglo-Sikh War in 1846. This connection gave Maxwell a favorable relationship with the current Mahajarah, Ranbir Singh.

On 22 April 1875 Maxwell and his wife arrived back in Srinagar after treating patients in Murvee for a few weeks. Upon his arrival, Singh granted the land and resources for a new hospital, which he opened on 4 May 1875. The hospital was maintained and furnished largely due to Thomas Baring, 1st Earl of Northbrook, who supported many of Maxwell's efforts to improve the state of the mission in Kashmir.

Maxwell played a large role in the incorporation of native doctors, who were once viewed as "worse than useless", into the medical work in the hospital and the country. His work alongside natives built a strong relationship between the Kashmir Medical Mission and the people of Kashmir.

Towards the end of Maxwell's work in Kashmir, the Maharajah sanctioned the building of a Mission House, which further strengthened the medical mission's presence and relations in Kashmir.

=== Return ===
In August 1875, after almost two years of medical mission work, Maxwell began to feel as though he had given the experience "a fair trial" and that he did not have the physical strength for the work anymore. He decided to leave the Kashmir Medical Mission in February 1876, giving General Lake and the Church Mission Society adequate time to find a replacement missionary.

However, in early September 1875, Maxwell began to suffer from "faintings" and after consultation with another doctor in the area, decided that he was unwell and must return to Europe as soon as possible. His wife also began to feel weak from their work, and they planned to leave Kashmir through Bombay on 1 November. Maxwell was replaced in the mission by Dr. Edmund Downes who served as a religious missionary prior to qualifying as a physician.

The Maxwells left India on 25 October 1875 by means of a ship at Bombay. After Maxwell returned to England due to his illness, he practiced medicine in Hanwell. In 1878, Maxwell and his wife moved to Woolwich, where he continued his practice in medicine until his retirement.

== Legacy and death ==
In addition to founding the Kashmir Mission Hospital, Maxwell wrote numerous papers about his medical findings from his time in Kashmir for The Lancet. In The Lancet, he also wrote about his experience with and ideas for improvements upon university teaching in London, along with his own medical observations from his practice. Maxwell wrote 15 articles for The Lancet from 1878 to 1911. Most notably, Maxwell authored Terminologia Medica Polyglotta: A Concise International Dictionary of Medical Terms, which is still regarded as an important cultural and knowledge source.

Theodore Maxwell was an enthusiastic and accomplished exponent of letterpress printing as a hobby. He established the Amateur Printers' Association in 1895 and introduced a quarterly journal, Amateur Printing which appeared in 72 editions between June 1895 and January 1913. Maxwell was the driving force behind Amateur Printing, acting as editor of the magazine and secretary of the Association. Despite his appeal for help with the journal in 1912, none was forthcoming and publication ceased after the January 1913 edition, as he said it would. St Bride Library in Fleet Street holds a complete set of Amateur Printing. Many editions contain exemplary work by Dr Maxwell.

Maxwell continued to face heart problems and retired from his medical practice in 1908.

Theodore Maxwell died in his home in Woolwich, England, on 13 February 1914, at the age of 67.

== Publications ==
- Maxwell, Theodore (December 1878). "Albuminuric Retinitis During Pregnancy". The Lancet. 112 (2886): 900–901. doi:10.1016/s0140-6736(02)44228-6.
- Maxwell, Theodore; Pearce Gould, A. (February 1879). "Epithelioma in Kashmir". The Lancet. 113 (2892): 152–154. doi:10.1016/s0140-6736(02)44310-3.
- Grey Glover, James; Maxwell, Theodore; Carter, William; Ker, HughR.; Kidd, GeorgeH. (October 1886). "Dr. Glover's Candidature and the Birmingham Committee". The Lancet. 128 (3293): 701–702. doi:10.1016/S0140-6736(01)78356-0.
- Maxwell, Theodore (April 1887). "Note on Extemporised Inhalers". The Lancet. 129 (3321): 821–822. doi:10.1016/s0140-6736(02)12923-0.
- Maxwell, Theodore (April 1888). "Resorcin in Chronic Painful Ulceration of the Tongue". The Lancet. 131 (3373): 798–799. doi:10.1016/S0140-6736(02)15974-5.
- Maxwell, Theodore (September 1889). "Hints to Students Beginning". The Lancet. 134 (3446): 567. doi:10.1016/S0140-6736(02)29313-7.
- Maxwell, Theodore (September 1889). "Hints to Students Beginning". The Lancet. 134 (3448): 667. doi:10.1016/S0140-6736(02)29601-4.
- Maxwell, T (May 1890). "The Inhalation of Bromide of Ammonium Fumes". The Lancet. 135 (3480): 1012. doi:10.1016/S0140-6736(01)75135-5.
- Maxwell, Theodore (May 1890). "Additional Note on the Fumes of Bromide of Ammonium". The Lancet. 135 (3481): 1068. doi:10.1016/s0140-6736(02)18593-x.
- Maxwell, Theodore (September 1890). "Intubation of the Larynx". The Lancet. 136 (3500): 693. doi:10.1016/S0140-6736(02)17407-1.
- Maxwell, T (May 1891). "The Preliminary Knowledge of Medical Students". The Lancet. 137 (3535): 1228. doi:10.1016/S0140-6736(02)18833-7.
- Maxwell, Theodore (January 1893). "The Proposed Teaching University for London". The Lancet. 141 (3622): 220–221. doi:10.1016/S0140-6736(00)80336-0. S2CID 27970929.
- Maxwell, Theodore (December 1894). "Simplified Book-Keeping with Ordinary Books". The Lancet. 144 (3721): 1506. doi:10.1016/s0140-6736(02)03486-4.
- Maxwell, Theodore (February 1895). "Inversion of Uterus; Death". The Lancet. 145 (3729): 404. doi:10.1016/S0140-6736(02)05412-0.
- Meredith Richards, H.; Maxwell, Theodore; Hurrell Style, A.; Skyrme, C.R.; Gadd, Wippell; Humphreys, F.R. (June 1911). "The National Insurance Bill". The Lancet. 177 (4579): 1532–1533. doi:10.1016/S0140-6736(01)62785-5.
- Maxwell, Theodore (1890). Terminologia Medica Polyglotta: A Concise International Dictionary of Medical Terms. J. & A. Churchill. OCLC 654469925.
