= Kairo cancer =

- Specialty: Dermatology, oncology

Kairo cancer is a cutaneous condition that may develop due to hydrocarbon-fueled heat exposure from coal-fired clothing warmers.

== See also ==
- Kangri ulcer
- List of cutaneous conditions
