= Nora Neve =

British nurse and medical missionary

- Born: 1867
- Died: 1952 (aged 84–85)
- Other names: Mary Nora Neve, Mary Neve
- Education: The Olives (nursing)
- Occupations: Nurse and Medical Missionary
- Organization: Church Missionary Society
- Title: Superintendent of Nursing at Kashmir Mission Hospital
- Successor: Miss L Wemyss
- Relatives: Arthur Neve, Ernest Neve

Nora Neve (1867-1952) was a British nurse and medical missionary with the Church Missionary Society who pioneered missionary nursing. Her work was instrumental in the development of the Kashmir Mission Hospital in Srinagar. She was the hospital's first Superintendent of Nursing and led education and cleanliness initiatives. Neve also recorded and published records of Kashmiri hospital practices in the American Journal of Nursing, contributing to the tool kits of other missionaries and preserving a part of Kashmir's cultural history.

== Background ==
=== Early life and influences ===
Nora Neve was born in England in 1873. Her family members were devout Christians and members of the Church of England. Two of her uncles, Arthur Neve and Ernest Neve, were medical missionaries in Kashmir by the time she was 11 years old. At the young age of 18, Nora traveled to Kashmir to visit her uncles and see the mission hospital where they worked. She decided to join them and the Church Missionary Society (CMS) and a year later, was officially announced as part of the society's ranks in the Church Missionary Gleaner July 1898 edition.

=== Education ===
Neve was sent by CMS to The Olives, a training home where they sent women missionary candidates. There, she received her nursing and additional Christian religious education. At the time of her attendance, The Olives was only a 4 year old private training school in the post-Nightingale era, when nursing schools were established in England that focused on providing future nurses practical education, promoting sanitation and cleanliness practices, and on fostering nursing theory and professionalism.

== Missionary work ==
Neve left for Kashmir by sea in September or October 1898. She was supported financially by the church of St. Mary Abbots of Kensington.

=== Kashmir Mission Hospital ===
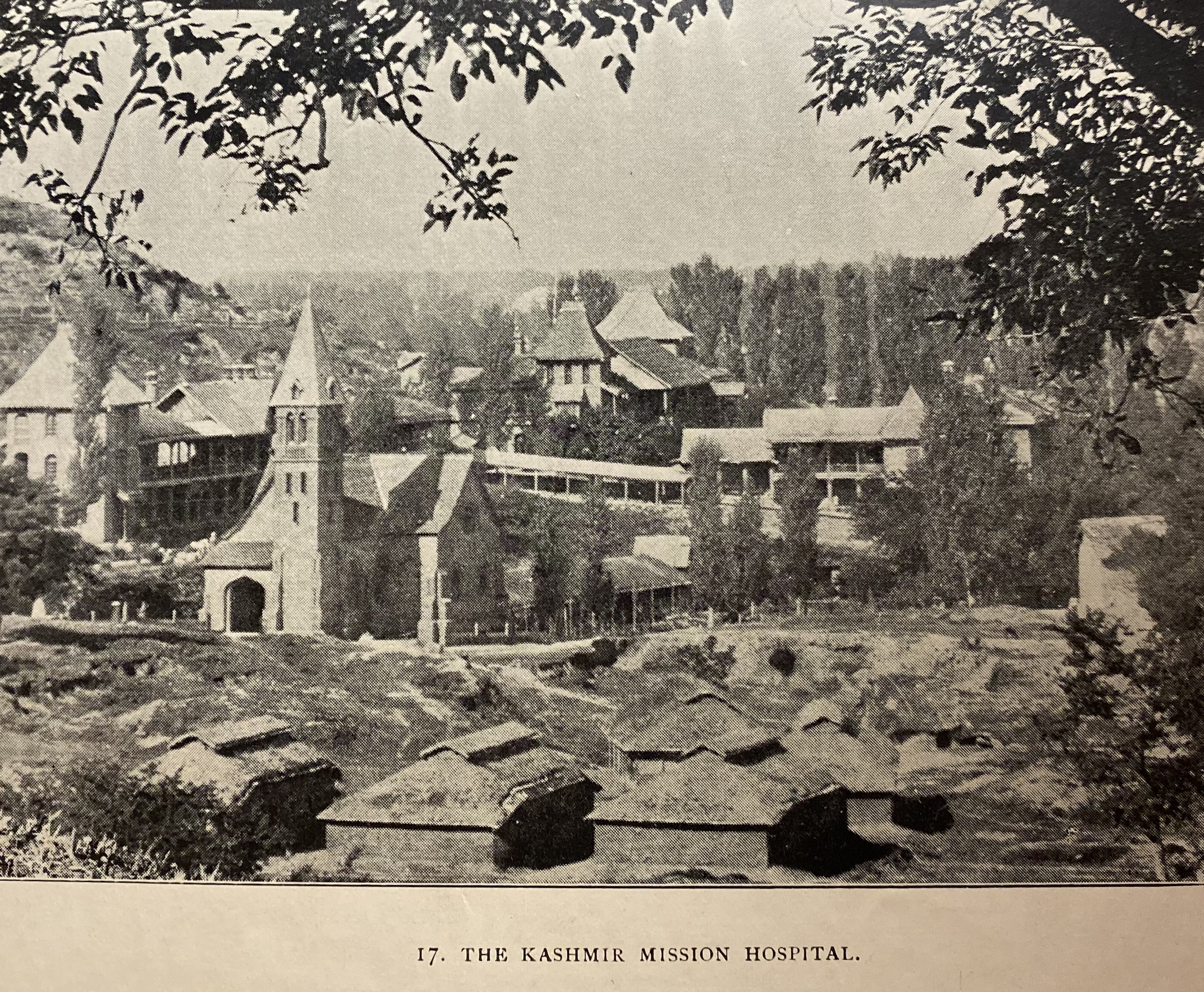
The Kashmir Mission Hospital

Neve joined Ernest and Arthur Neve at the Kashmir Mission Hospital at Srinagar. The hospital was considered a modern, state of the art institution. It was known as far away as Balistan, more than 100 miles from Srinagar, from discharged patients who traveled and told others. Eventually, during Neve's time, it would grow to consist of 4 male doctors, 2 English nurses, and 120 hospital beds. In a year, they reported 22,735 new outpatients, 1,764 in patients, 5,038 surgical operations, with 15-18 operations on a busy day. The hospital also played a religious role and considered physical healing to be a vehicle to share the gospel, which they actively taught to patients. Neve shared this sentiment, expressing hope in an article she wrote for the American Journal of Nursing that increasing numbers of patients would be converted to Christianity.

==== Leadership at the mission hospital ====
Neve was the Superintendent of Nursing at the Kashmir Missions Hospital. She was an indispensable part of the team developing the hospital; Ernest Neve said that without her, it would have broken down. He also credited her with the efficiency of the hospital, the strict cleanliness, and the disciplined decor, which she maintained through inspections on her daily rounds. Through these practices, she brought the Kashmir Mission Hospital to modern European standards based on the germ theory which had been developed only decades before.

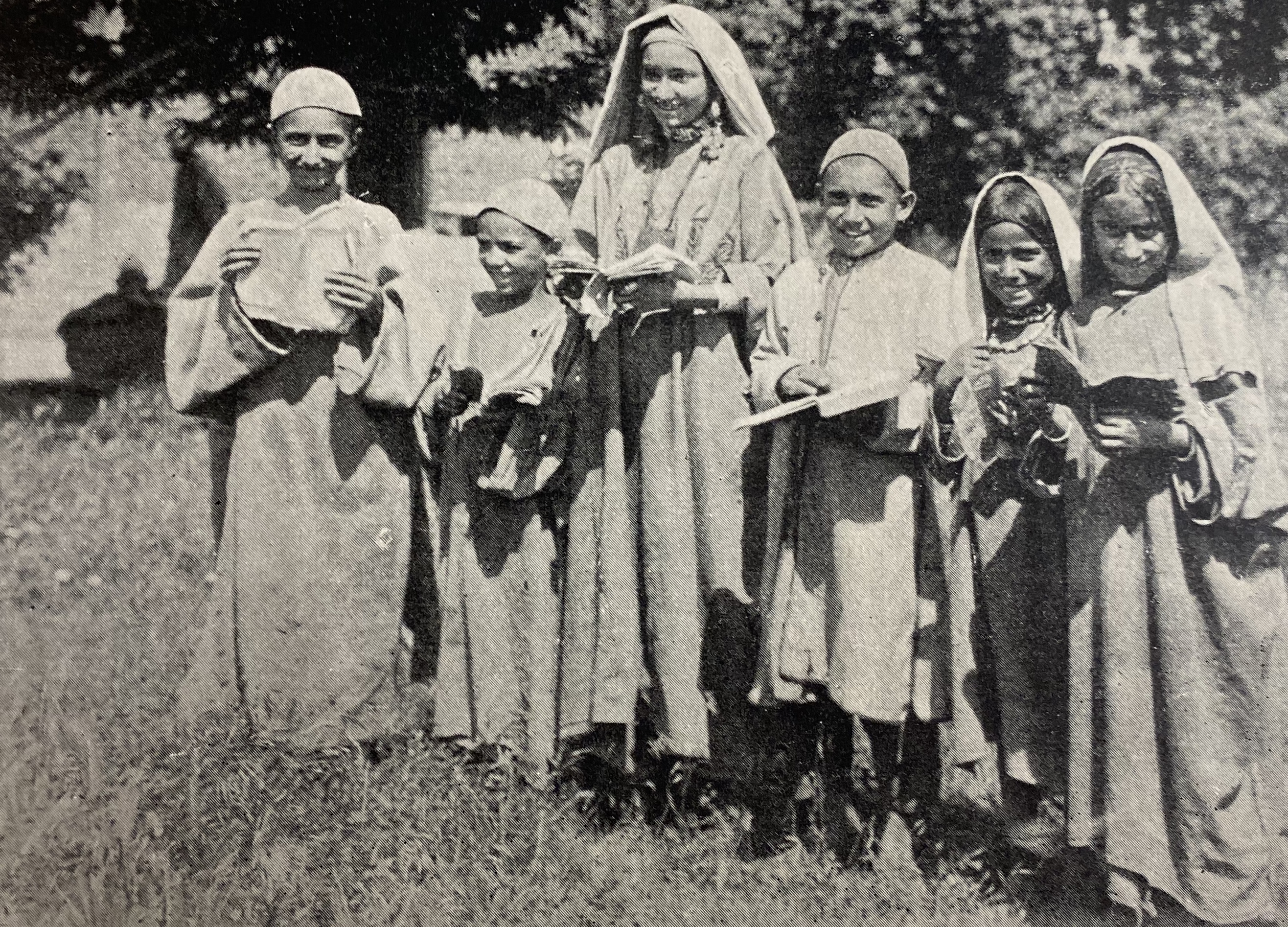
Patients/students at the North India Leper Hospital

She was described as a kind and patient nurse and was known for teaching her patients as well as caring for their physical ailments, although she reported finding more success teaching young patients than older. She was especially in charge of the women's wards in the Sir Petrabh Signh Pavilion, as nursing care was done by those of the same gender as the patient. She also camped at sites beyond the hospital that were in great need to provide aid temporarily.

Neve led other nurses and staff at the hospital. Other nurses at the mission hospital who worked under her supervision include two English nurses, Lucy McCormick and H Smith, with visiting nurses helping during the busy summer months. She spent much of her time supervising eastern assistants, who were recorded to need more assistance because they lack "sense of duty".

Few government hospitals in Kashmir had a nurse on staff at this time, and Neve's necessary and innovative work served as an example for other hospitals in the region. In addition to the Mission Hospital, Neve worked the North India Leper Hospital, a government hospital.

== Legacy ==
Throughout her time in Kashmir, Neve actively corresponded with the American Journal of Nursing, describing her work in detail and offering advice to other missionaries. This included tips as small as how to deal with pesky flies and articles as long as to describe the complex workings of both the Kashmir Mission Hospital and the nearby Leper's Hospital. Through these, she created a guidebook for other nurse missionaries to follow, whether in South Asia or elsewhere, and written record of Kashmir's culture.

=== Additional published work ===
==== Nursing in Mission Stations ====
Neve's article "Nursing in Mission Stations" was published in the American Journal of Nursing in 1908. In it, she describes her work at the hospital in Srinagar, as described above in the Kashmir Mission Hospital section. She describes the way that it is looked down on for men to care for women outside of their families, explaining why the hospital and its staff were segregated by gender.

==== A Leper Hospital in North India ====
"A Leper Hospital in North India" was published in the American Journal of Nursing a year later, in 1909. It describes another hospital where she worked, which specialized in care of people with leprosy. Although the hospital was managed by CMS, it was run by the state. She reports 173 admissions in 1908 and the average length of stay to be 1,104 days because leprosy is a chronic disease and those infected had to live in years of quarantine to protect others. Some of the patients were treated and no longer had leprosy symptoms, but stayed for care for their other ailments. Work at the hospital was done by orderlies, superintendents, and patients. She notes that just like at the Kashmir Mission Hospital, patients were only cared for by those who shared their gender, as this was a pervasive cultural standard that informed medical practices in Kashmir.

=== Death ===
Neve died in 1952 at the age of 73. She is remembered today for her pioneering nursing work in Kashmir, the written documentation of Kashmir culture and missionary service, and commitment to bringing education and Christianity to the people of Kashmir.
