= Sheikh Showkat Hussain =

Kashmiri writer and scholar

- شیخ شوکت حُسین
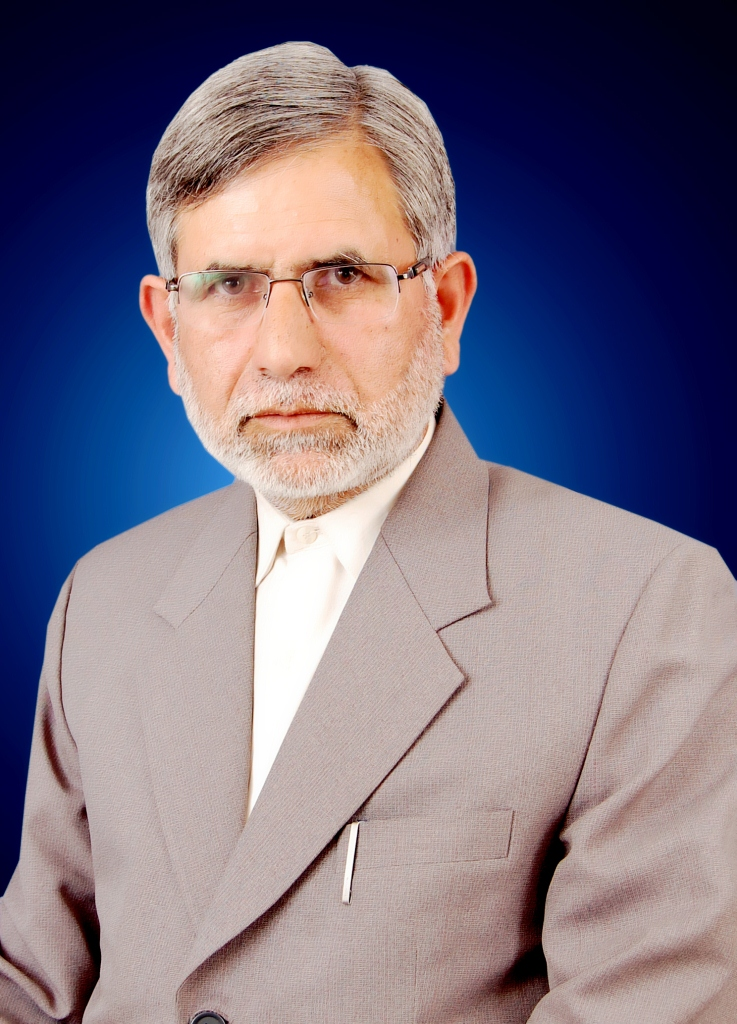
- Official portrait in 2014
- Born: 5 February 1954 (age 72); Srinagar, Jammu and Kashmir
- Education: Aligarh Muslim University
- Occupations: Teacher, researcher, author
- Notable work: Kashmir Profiles (2017), Kashmir Saga (2016)

Sheikh Showkat Hussain; born on 5 February 1954 is a Kashmiri political analyst and a prominent scholar of human rights and international law, he has authored several books on the Kashmir conflict.

== Biography ==
=== Early life and education ===
Sheikh Showkat completed his bachelor of law degree in 1978 from Aligarh Muslim University, India. He proceeded for higher studies and completed his master's in law. He was awarded PhD for his thesis "The Status of Non-Muslims in Islamic state" in 1990. The thesis was published in form of a book, titled, "Minorities, Islam and Nation state" in Malaysia. Right from his student days he has been actively observing and participating in political movements. Even when he was a graduate student he participated in an election campaign against Sheikh Muhammad Abdullah in Ganderbal constituency once the later compromised his stand on self-determination of Kashmir for coming to power.

After his graduation, he proceeded to Aligarh where he remained a proactive student. When he joined Aligarh Muslim University, it was in a severe crisis because the Government of India had allegedly deprived the university of its Islamic character and was in the process of erasing its cultural ethos through an enactment in 1972. He fought against this campaign and was suspended from the university for opposing the cultural proselytisation of his alma mater. His activism transcended beyond the university in the form of his activities for the restoration of the minority character of Aligarh Muslim University, the preservation of Muslim personal law and the restoration of Babri Masjid to Muslims. In this context, he again remained at the forefront of the campaign against the election of former Indian Prime Minister Rajiv Gandhi in his constituency Ameti while the latter was challenged by Raj Mohan Gandhi, the grandson of Mahatma Gandhi.

=== Academic career ===
Right from his student days along with being an activist he has also been a researcher on student activism. On this subject he conducted a survey of various students groups within India. Sheikh Showkat has specialised expertise in Human Rights, minority rights and Humanitarian Law, he developed a comparative perspective on Islam and modern notions of human rights. His work in this regard was published in India (Islam and Human Rights) and Malaysia (Islam and Human rights). The work on human rights received appreciation far and wide, Muslim World League journal, Mecca also published its portions in its journal. He worked actively in dissemination of humanitarian law in collaboration with International Committee of Red Cross; the purpose was to sensitise non-state actors about limits on means and methods of warfare, to deliver upon the purpose he coordinated 27 seminars across conflict ridden Kashmir. He was seminal in starting a post-graduate diploma in human rights at the University of Kashmir, the course was later suspended.

=== Teaching career ===
He was appointed as research associate, Institute of Objective Studies New Delhi (1987–1990) and later moved to Malaysia as assistant professor, International Islamic University Malaysia (1990–1995). While he was in Malaysia, Kashmir was experiencing extreme phase of insurgency against the Indian rule. He had a feeling that though there was a lot of activity against subjugation the resistance of Kashmir has not been articulated in a systematic way. This led him to leave Malaysia and come back to Kashmir where he tried to provide content to resistance through his writings in local dailies. In 2000 he joined Department of Law, University of Kashmir. His academic pursuits didn't impede his contribution to Kashmir resistance in the form of his writings and oration. It was this activism on his part that landed him among those who were charged with sedition. Sheikh Showkat was charged for sedition in Delhi along with several other prominent figure such as the Kashmiri leader Syed Ali Shah Geelani, writer activist Arundhati Roy, Prof. S.A.R Geelani, Sujato Bhadra, Varavara Rao and Shuddhabrata Sengupta, for making a speech at a convention titled "Azadi: The Only Way”. This action of the Indian state was condemned worldwide.

=== Current engagement ===
Having served as the Head & Dean at the School of Legal Studies, Central University of Kashmir, Dr Sheikh also served as the Principal at the Kashmir Law College, University of Kashmir and taught international law and human rights.

== Bibliography ==
Books authored by Dr. Sheikh Showkat Hussain
S.No.	Name	Edition	Date Published	Literary Form	Language	Description	Publisher	ISBN
1.	Islam and Human Rights	1st	1991	Non-fiction	English	97 pages	Budaya Ilmu	NA
2.	Facets of Resurgent Kashmir	1st	2008	Non-fiction	English	212 pages	Kashmir Institute (Srinagar)	NA
3.	Kashmir Profiles	1st	2016	Non-fiction	English	159 pages	Kashmir Institute (Srinagar)	9789352545629
4.	Kashmir Saga	1st	2017	Non-fiction	English	143 pages	Kashmir Institute (Srinagar)	9789352545599
