= Arthur Neve =

Anglican doctor in Kashmir (1859–1919)

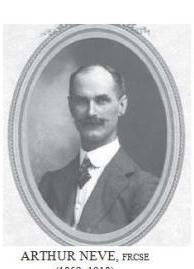
- Dr. Arthur Neve, a medical missionary who served the people of Kashmir for 37 years
- Born: 24 December 1859; Brighton, England
- Died: 5 September 1919; Kashmir
- Occupations: Doctor and Medical Missionary
- Known for: Build and ran the Kashmir Medical Missionary
- Relatives: Dr. Ernest Neve, Brother; Nora Neve, niece

Arthur Neve, MD (1859–1919) was a doctor and Christian medical missionary who felt the call to serve abroad early on in life. As a well distinguished medic, Neve willingly left home at a young age when he was called to Kashmir to continue the medical missions of Dr. Theodore Maxwell and Dr. William Elmsie. He moved to Asia and never looked back, soon becoming the head of the Kashmir Medical Mission where he would go on to serve the sick in Kashmir for the next thirty four years by building the Kashmir Mission Hospital with his brother, Ernest. Influenced by his strong roots in his religion, Neve served the people of Kashmir while also spreading his Christian message to a predominantly Muslim and Brahmin area.

He also served in World War I as a Major at the military hospitals in Brighton and France. He was praised for his extraordinary work serving for his home and the injured of the war.

Neve is also remembered as an avid mountaineer for his excursions in the rural outskirts of Kashmir, as traveling and geographical research became one of his favorite hobbies while living abroad. After finishing his time serving in the war, he returned to Kashmir in 1919 where he died shortly after.

== Background ==
=== Early life and family ===
Arthur Neve was born on 24 December 1859 in Brighton, England. His parents were strongly devoted to the Church of England, and were interested in the medical missionary work that the Church was doing abroad at the time. His parents worked to incorporate religion into their daily lives, and growing up in a religious environment with parents who were interested in medical missionary work heavily influenced his yearn to serve abroad and his evangelical work throughout the rest of his career and his life.

Neve had one younger brother named Ernest, who was two years younger than him. Because they were so close in age, they grew up doing everything together and attended the same schools. They ultimately had the same passions, and eventually Ernest Neve grew up to follow in his brother's footsteps and joined Arthur's medical mission work in Kashmir. There, he became an honorary surgeon at the Kashmir Mission Hospital where he lived with his brother and remained until his death. The Neve brothers also inspired their niece, Nora Neve, to join them as a nurse in missionary service.

=== Education ===
Neve began his schooling at the Brighton Grammar School, where he attended with his brother, Ernest. He then went on to attend The University of Edinburgh in 1876. Having felt the call to serve early in his life, he entered his studies at the University level knowing he wanted to become a medical missionary, and completed his initial medical training there.

After graduating from the University of Edinburgh he proceeded to work as a house physician in the Royal Infirmary of Edinburgh. After gaining experience at the Infirmary, he was appointed the Resident Medical Officer to the Livingstone Memorial Dispensary and Training Society under the Edinburgh Medical Missionary Society where he continued to train and gain experience. This society had organized and participated in a fair amount of work with medical missions in the past, thus, it is here that Neve began preparing and training for his medical work abroad.

In 1881, Neve became a resident physician at 39 Cowgate, which was one of many dispensaries and hostels for senior medical students that were dispersed throughout the poor districts of Edinburgh. With his district, Neve had his first exposure to working with people in need. He lived amongst the poor in the area where he was stationed for two years, and his daily tasks included medical, surgical, and maternity cases. He also worked to keep his religion alive and in practice throughout his time at 39 Cowgate, and did so by leading and planning events such as outdoor meetings and Sunday masses. Gaining this experience at 39 Cowgate became the impetus that prepared and trained Neve for his life's work serving in the poor rural areas of Kashmir.

== Medical Missionary Work In Kashmir ==
=== The Journey ===
Knowing from an early age that he wanted to serve abroad in an area where he could live and serve among other Christians, Neve began reading books on Africa while at Livingstone in the hopes of working there after he finished his medical training. He even went as far as to inquire about working and offer to lend his services in Uganda during this time. Yet one day he received a call one day from Dr. Downes, a doctor in Kashmir who was in an urgent need for a doctor to come to Kashmir who could succeed him.

Suddenly, Neve found himself accepting Downes request and decided to leave his life in the United Kingdom and move to Kashmir. Despite changing his initial plans of working and living amongst other Christians, Neve saw this choice as an opportunity not only to fulfill his passion of helping those in need but also to spread his message of Christianity to two groups living in Kashmir who strongly opposed his religion, Muslims and Brahmans.

Soon after accepting Downes offer, Neve joined the Church Missionary Society and found himself heading to Kashmir. Upon his arrival to Asia, he spent his first few weeks traveling around India to places like Bombay, Ajmer, Jeypore, and Delhi. Starting his travels, he set his aim at meeting many different doctors and priests in order to build friendships and alliances with them. During these first few weeks he also sought to discover the cooperation between and presence of Anglican Baptists and Presbyterians in the area, as well as gaining insight into the different medical missions already in place around the different cities he was visiting. One of his biggest take aways from this initial tour of India was his first glimpses of the types of sicknesses and diseases he would face in this part of the world, and he discovered there was a large presence of choleraic malaria at the time.

After his tour of India, Neve arrived in Kashmir in 1882 where he began his work that picked up where his predecessors, Dr. William Jackson Elmsie, Dr. Theodore Maxwell and Dr. Edmund Downes left off. Within the next two years, he was joined by Ernest, who completed his medical training and was now a doctor. In 1898, he was joined by his niece Nora Neve, who had completed her nursing training with the Church Missionary Society.

=== Medical missionary work ===
==== Kashmir Mission Hospital ====
Upon his arrival to the rural town of Srinagar where he was sent to work in Kashmir, he discovered that there was already a mission hospital there that had been established by Elmsie and Maxwell and upheld by Dr. Downes since their deaths. Although he was impressed by the efficiency of what was already in place, he believed the current conditions of the hospital—leaking barns and mud huts, patients laying on the floor, and an undertrained staff—were unsuitable for effective treatment and large scale surgery. Thus, Neve immediately knew that the first step to helping the people of Srinagar was going to be to build a new hospital that could accommodate both the procedures and patients as well as improve the training for the nurses in Srinagar. Yet due to lack of funds, lack of assistance, and initial lack of government support or complete government approval, this plan faced initial setbacks.

Over the course of eight years, Neve worked with his brother to gather funds from local donors, save up money from medical service fees, and gain the approval of the Kashmiri government in order to build and open the Kashmir Mission Hospital. Although this was an extensive process, once built, the hospital became (according to Ernest), "one of the most important public institutions in Kashmir". The project began in 1888 and was fully completed and running in 1896. Replacing the mud roofs, mud walls, and mud floors, the new hospital featured Italian-style buildings complete with red roofs and picturesque verandas. There were also wings that resembled most developed hospitals, like an outpatient wing that included: waiting rooms, consulting rooms, dispensaries, laboratories, and x-ray and operating rooms. Not only were these rooms developed and sufficient, they were also all equipped with the proper medical tools and a now well-trained Kashmiri staff. The upkeep of the hospital remained in the hands of British visitors to the hospital, service fees from patients, and once the success of the hospital became apparent, the Kashmiri gentry.

The people of Kashmir immediately flocked to the new hospital, as most people who lived in Srinagar had never been offered this type of sophisticated care. The most common diseases that Neve treated were cholera, tuberculosis, and eye diseases. By 1893, even before being fully completed, the hospital featured 135 beds and had treated upwards of 20,606 patients. As the years went on, the success of the hospital began to rise. Within the first ten years of its opening, annually, Neve and his staff were treating 30,000 patients, feeding 1,200 patients gratuitously, and operating on 3,000-4,000 patients per year. As the popularity of the hospital began to grow throughout Kashmir, people came from all over the area to get treated by Neve and his staff. The scope of the popularity of the hospital became apparent when the patient demographic was considered, as Ernest reported that if one was to walk through the wings of the hospital at any given time, there could be over a hundred different villages or towns represented.

During the cold winters in Kashmir, Neve worked to keep his Christianity alive and placed importance on his evangelical work. He did this by having Christian pastors visit with patients in the hospital wards to offer prayers or words of comfort. He made it a point to offer this service to each and every patient, with no discrimination to any patient's religious affiliation.

=== Travels and other activities in Kashmir ===
==== Mountaineering ====
During times when he was able to take time off from the hospital, Neve found great enjoyment in discovering the outlying parts of Kashmir for either travel, medical work for people who could not reach his hospital, or evangelical work. His first tour in 1882 to the outskirts of Kashmir sparked this passion, as it allowed him to see other tribes, villages, people, and terrains. This first tour also led him to believe that there was more medical need and work to be done throughout these different parts of Kashmir, and this mentality contributed to what drove him to begin the long process of building the hospital.

While on these excursions, Neve travelled to places like the Hindus Valley, the Saltoro Valley, and Tagur. He became a reputable mountaineer, and some of his notable climbs include a climb to Nun Kun at 23,000 feet, as well as The Nubra Valley in the Himalayas.

In his down time, Neve also enjoyed many different types of music and water color sketching.

== Recognition, accomplishments, and time in the war ==
=== Medical recognitions ===
Upon answering the call to serve abroad, Neve spent thirty four years in Kashmir as the head of the Kashmir Medical Mission and was the head of his self-built Kashmir Mission Hospital for thirty-seven years. He served this position right up until his death, after which his brother took it over for him. Due to the respect he gained from his medical accomplishments in the communities in Kashmir and throughout India, he was granted the position of President of the Medical Missionary Association of India from 1908-1910, and in 1909 he served as the Vice President of the Indian Medical Congress. He was awarded the Kaiser-I-Hind Gold Medal by the British Government in India in 1901. Neve was also known for his description of the unique Kangri cancer, a skin cancer found only in Kashmir.

=== Other achievements ===
Neve was an avid author and wrote often about Kashmir. He wrote books such as Kashmir, Ladakh and Tibet (1899), Picturesque Kashmir (1900), Thirty Years in Kashmir(1913), The Tourist’s Guide to Kashmir, Ladakh and Skardo (1923), which were all works that chronicled his expeditions that he took while on holidays from the hospital. His passion for mountaineering and geography led him to receive the Back Award in 1911 from the Royal Geographical Society due to his study of glaciology and his original geographical research of the Himalayas.

=== Medical Work in World War I ===
In 1914, Neve was due for a furlough, thus, he returned to Brighton and decided to offer his services and serve for the British war effort in World War I. He quickly became a Major, R.A.M.C at the Kitchener Hospital in Brighton and continued this ranking later at the Dartford Military hospital. At these hospitals, his skills helped serve not only all the injured in the war, but also the Indian troops serving for the British, as his knowledge of India and his ability to communicate with them served as a major asset. With many years experience under his belt, Neve was praised for the work he did at this war hospital, and was sent to France in 1918 to serve in their war hospital. There, Neve's work was equipped with an insufficient staff and long, strenuous days. After a year in France, Neve was able to return to his home in Kashmir where a cholera outbreak was just beginning to spread.

== Death and legacy ==
Exhausted after serving for the British for four years and returning to Kashmir to immediately start treating a cholera epidemic, Dr. Arthur Neve was struck with a fever in the early fall of 1919 that resulted from an influenza he had acquired while living in France the previous year. Unable to recover, he died on 5 September 1919.

Neve's loss was felt far and wide throughout Kashmir by many different people across many different religions. His funeral, according to Ernest, was a showing of the "...immense concourse of those of many races and religions, rich and poor, high and low, who followed—all these were signs, we may well believe, of something deeper and of more lasting importance, a true recognition of the beauty of a life spent in witness and service."

In his death, the Hindu and Muslim community acknowledged his loss, as a member of the Hindu society claimed, "...he had a special and sincere love of the country and its inhabitants, [and he] served all...without difference of race or sex.". Sir Aurel Stein, a distinguished authority on central Asia, spoke of Neve as a "...beacon of hope in this land which has suffered so much...". His legacy and life's work was summed up in a statement by the former Resident British Political Agent in Kashmir who said, "...no man living has done so much for Kashmir as he has done, and the memory of his saintly and unselfish life, and of his high skill of a surgeon will remain for many years to come, not only in Srinagar, but in nearly every village in Kashmir."

In honor of his death, many people donated to the Kashmir Medical Hospital where Ernest continued Neve's legacy until his own death in 1946.
