= St. Joseph's Higher Secondary School, Baramulla =

Missionary school in Baramulla, J&K, India

St. Joseph's Higher Secondary School

Location
- Opp. Head Post Office; Baramulla, Kashmir, J&K, 193101; India; 34.203512°N 74.350305°E

Information
- School type: Missionary Private
- Motto: Manners maketh man
- Religious affiliation: Catholic Christian
- Patron saint: Saint Joseph
- Established: 1903; 123 years ago
- Founder: Fr. C. B. Simons MHM
- Status: Active
- School board: J & K Board of School Education
- Administrator: Roman Catholic Diocese of Jammu–Srinagar
- Principal: Fr. Suresh Britto
- Faculty: Local
- Gender: Co-Educational
- Enrollment: 4000+
- Classes: Class Nursery – 12th
- Language: English
- Hours in school day: 6^{Hr}
- Classrooms: 160+
- Campus: Urban
- Houses: Peace, Grace, Joy and Wisdom
- Colours: Blue, Green, Red, Yellow (All classes), Orange, Violet (Primary only)
- Sports: Football, Cricket, Volleyball, Basketball, kho-kho, Badminton, Athletics, hockey
- Nickname: Josephites
- Website: http://sjskashmir.com/index.php

St. Joseph's Higher Secondary School Baramulla (commonly referred to as the St. Josephs School Baramulla or SJS) is a private school located in Baramulla, Jammu and Kashmir, India. The school has been upgraded to the status of a higher secondary school and has also started online education, the first in the Kashmir valley. St. Josephs School is located in the city of Baramulla. It has around 4,000 students and over 125 staff members.

The school was founded by the Mill Hill Fathers or Mill Hill Missionaries from London in 1903, owned by the Catholic Diocese of Jammu-Srinagar and is administered by its Education Society (Reg. No. 1601-S of 1989) under the provisions of article 30(1) of the Constitution; for everyone without any distinction of religion, caste, creed or colour.

== History ==
The foundation of St. Josephs School Baramulla was laid by Father C. Simon, in late 18th century and eventually in 1903 he established the school. St. Joseph's School is one of the oldest missionary schools in Kashmir valley. The school was founded and run by Saint Joseph's Missionary Society of Mill Hill as a Boarding school initially. It was run by Society of Jesus after Mill Hill Missionaries left the mission.

== Alumni ==
- Maqbool Bhat- Kashmiri Revolutionary Leader, Journalist, author, philosopher, humanist and founder of National Liberation Front (NLF)and then declared leader of Jammu Kashmir Liberation Front (JKLF).
- Mohammad Najibullah – Afghan President
- Syed Altaf Bukhari - Indian Politician
- Muhammad Ashraf Bukhari – Bureaucrat
- Muhammad Yusuf Saraf- Chief Justice of the Azad Kashmir High Court

== See also ==
- List of Schools in India
- List of Christian Schools in India
