= Kangri cancer =

Cancer

- Other names: Kangri carcinoma
- Specialty: Dermatology, oncology
- Symptoms: Papular or noduloulcerative skin growth, pain, bleeding
- Complications: Loco-regional metastasis
- Usual onset: Usually after prolonged heat exposure
- Types: Squamous-cell carcinoma
- Causes: Chronic thermal exposure from use of a kangri
- Risk factors: Prolonged use of a kangri, erythema ab igne
- Diagnostic method: Clinical examination, biopsy and histopathology
- Prevention: Avoidance of prolonged kangri-associated heat exposure
- Treatment: Surgical excision; radiation therapy in selected cases
- Frequency: Rare

Kangri cancer is a type of squamous-cell carcinoma of the skin. It is found only in Kashmir in the northwest of the Indian subcontinent. It occurs on the lower abdomen and inner thighs and is due to the use of a kanger, a ceramic pot covered with wicker-work, carried as a source of warmth during cold weather. One of the earliest records of the condition was made in 1881 by surgeons at the Kashmir Mission Hospital and its cause was recognized in the early 20th century by Arthur Neve.

Despite current knowledge of the cause of this condition, cases are still being reported.

Other conditions associated with prolonged use of kangri in this fashion include erythema ab igne, a reticulate hypermelanosis with erythema.

== Signs and symptoms ==
Most cases (80%) of squamous cell carcinoma attributed to ultraviolet radiation present in areas of the skin that are usually more exposed to sunlight (e.g., head, face, neck). Although a particular form of squamous cell carcinoma, Kangri cancer is more often associated with the abdomen, thigh, and leg regions due to the usage and positioning of kangri pots, which come in close contact with these anatomical features.

Over time, the use of kangri pots to keep warm results in erythema ab igne, a precancerous keratotic growth that "take the shape of superficial, serpiginous, reticular blackish brown colored lesions." Eventually, the cells at the lesion site become more irregular in shape and form; the lesions ulcerate and may become itchy and bloody. The resulting irregular growth is the presentation of kangri cancer.

== Risk factors ==
Use of the kangri pot is the principal cause of kangri cancer. The pot holds hot wood and charcoal and is put in direct contact with the skin of the abdomen and the thigh areas as a way to keep warm during winter in northern India. Elements that are believed to contribute to the development of kangri cancer are heat, burning wood particles, smoke, soot, and tar of burnt chinar leaves.

In one study, researchers found that kangri cancer patients had a history of using a kangri for 5–6 hours a day, 3–4 months a year.

== Genetics ==
Beyond the behavioral risk factor of prolonged usage of kangri pots, researchers have begun to look at genetic mutations that may make some people more predisposed to develop kangri cancer.

- In one study, people with kangri cancer were found to be approximately twice as likely as a control group to have a mutation in the TP53 gene (codon 72 polymorphism). Patients with higher grade tumors exhibited more proline amino acid mutations at this site.
- Another study confirmed the association of kangri Cancer and TP53, finding substitutions and insertions in 40% of the kangri cancer patients studied. The researchers observed a significant correlation with mutation status and age as well as with the presence of affected lymph nodes in patients. TP53 may, in the future, serve as "potential molecular marker and prognostic tool" for kangri cancer. Furthermore, PTEN mutations were found in two of thirty patients studied; though due to the small sample size, no useful conclusions could be postulated.
- Two polymorphisms of the HSP70 gene were discovered to be correlated with poor prognosis in cases of kangri cancer; the “Hsp70-2 A/G or G/G and Hsp70homC/C genotypes” could potentially be utilized to measure risk of kangri cancer development as well as to predict prognosis.

== Treatment ==
=== Surgery ===
In the treatment of kangri cancer, surgery is, most often, the first-line course of action to remove the primary tumor.

=== Radiotherapy ===
External beam radiotherapy has been used in one person to prevent the relapse and growth of tumor metastases to the head and neck regions. The prophylactic applications of radiation have been noted as "encouraging" in this one case, reducing some tumors and eliminating others.

Another study with a couple of the same authors found that radiotherapy after surgery helped with the reduction and cure of head and neck tumors in additional cases. The researchers suggest that external beam radiotherapy should be part of the treatment course for patients who have or at risk of developing tumors in the head and neck areas.

== Prognosis ==
A research article from 1923 noted that the average life expectancy of those with kangri cancer was about fifteen months, though there have been records of people dying within one year and living for more than twenty years with kangri cancer. Updated life expectancy is not found in more recent scientific publications.

However, in 2013, it was noted that the progression from erythema ab igne to squamous cell carcinoma was between one and two decades.

It has been reported that about one-third to one-half of patients with kangri cancer show metastasis to local lymph nodes.

== Epidemiology ==
The first case of kangri cancer was reportedly recognized in 1819.

The incidence of kangri cancer is higher for those over age 50.

There is no definitive predominance of kangri cancer in either males or females. Some studies may point to higher prevalence in males while others observed higher prevalence in females.

In scientific literature, kangri cancer has only been attributed to the Kashmir region due to the traditional use of kangri pots. Kangri cancer is limited to this population, and thus, relatively little is known still, and there is much to be studied about the condition.

In 2017, a local Kashmir media outlet, The Kashmir Reader, reported that researchers and health care providers are optimistic about the reduced incidence of kangri cancer, citing the rise of thermal clothing and electric heating sources that are now used in place of kangri pots to keep warm.

== See also ==
- List of cutaneous conditions
