= List of popes who died violently =

A collection of popes have had violent deaths through the centuries. The circumstances have ranged from martyrdom (Pope Stephen I) to war (Lucius II), to an alleged beating by a jealous husband (Pope John XII). A number of other popes have died under circumstances that some believe to be murder, but for which definitive evidence has not been found.

== Martyr popes ==
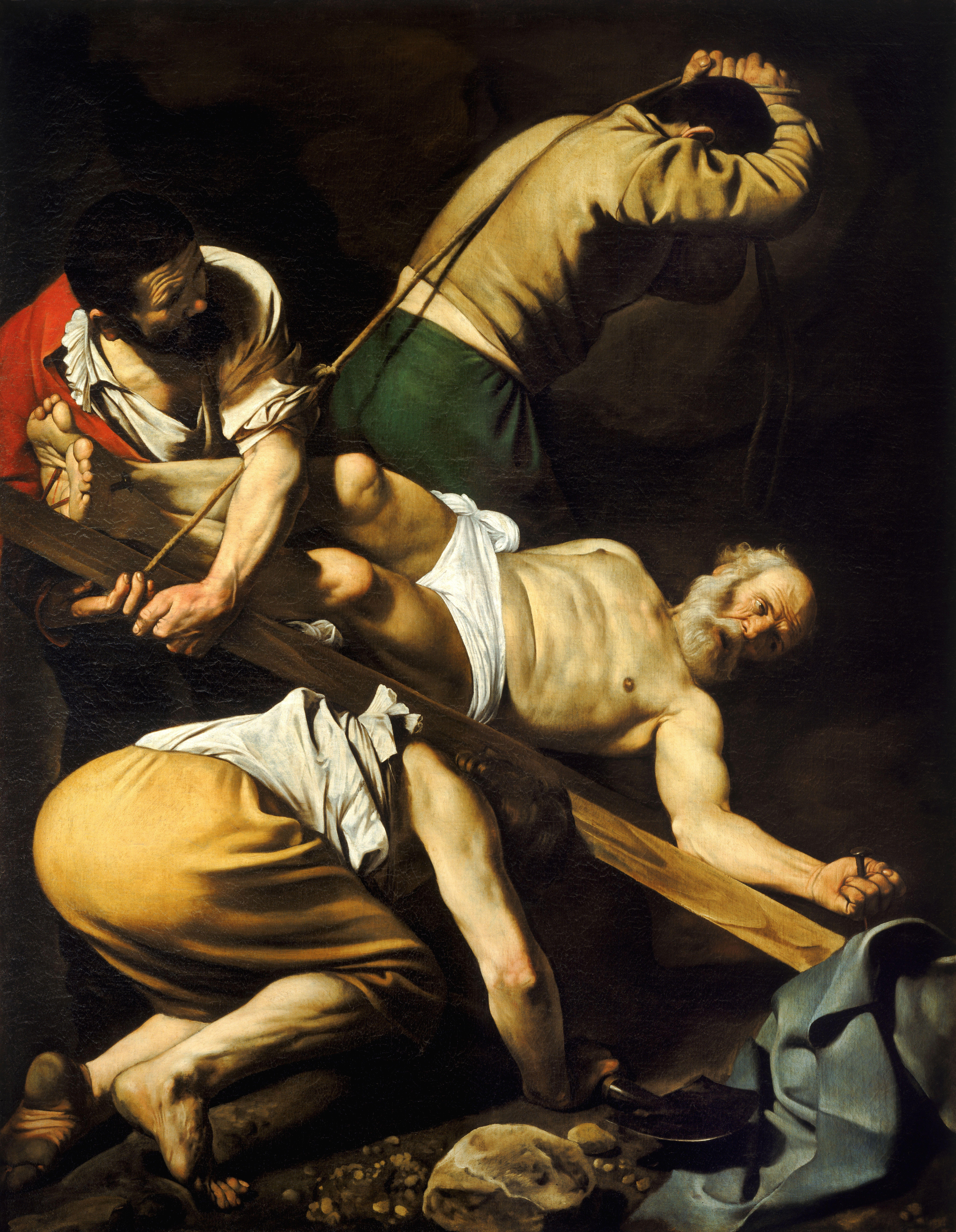
In tradition, the first pope, Saint Peter, was crucified upside-down.

- Saint Peter (c. 67), traditionally martyred by upside-down crucifixion
- Pope Linus (Saint) (c. 67 – c. 76)
- Pope Anacletus or Cletus (Saint) (c. 79 – c. 92)
- Pope Clement I (Saint) (c. 92 – c. 99), thrown into sea with anchor around his neck
- Pope Evaristus (Saint) (c. 99 – c. 108),
- Pope Sixtus I (Saint) (c. 119 – c. 128)
- Pope Telesphorus (Saint) (c. 128 – c. 138)
- Pope Anicetus (Saint) (155–166), traditionally martyred
- Pope Soter (Saint) (166–175), died a martyr
- Pope Eleuterus (Saint) (175–189), died a martyr
- Pope Victor I (Saint) 189–199, died a martyr
- Pope Calixtus I (Saint) (217–222), died a martyr
- Pope Urban I (Saint) 222–230, died a martyr
- Pope Pontian (Saint) 230–235, condemned to mines in Sardinia and died on island of Tavolara
- Pope Anterus (Saint), elected 21 November 235, martyred at hands of Emperor Maximus
- Pope Fabian (Saint), elected 10 January 236 and died a martyr during persecution and decapitated by Decius
- Pope Cornelius (Saint), elected March 251 and died a martyr June 253
- Pope Lucius I (Saint), elected 25 June 253 and martyred 5 March 254
- Pope Stephen I (Saint), elected 12 May 254 and martyred 2 August 257
- Pope Sixtus II (Saint), elected 30 August 257 and martyred 6 August 258
- Pope Dionysius (Saint), elected 22 July 259 after year of persecutions and died 26 December 268, martyred
- Pope Felix I (Saint), elected 5 January 269 and died 30 December 274, martyred
- Pope Eutychian (Saint), elected 4 January 275 and martyred 7 December 283
- Pope Caius (Saint), elected 17 December 283 and martyred 22 April 296 but not at hands of his uncle Diocletian
- Pope Marcellinus (Saint), elected 30 June 296 and martyred 25 October 304 during persecution of Diocletian
- Pope Marcellus I (Saint), elected 27 May 308 after 4-year vacancy and martyred 16 January 309
- Pope Eusebius (Saint), elected 18 April 309 and martyred in Sicily 17 August 309.
- Pope John I (Saint), elected 13 August 523, during the Ostrogothic occupation of the Italian peninsula. Was sent as an envoy by Ostrogoth king Theodoric the Great to Constantinople. Upon return, Theodoric accused John I of conspiracy with the Byzantine empire. Imprisoned and starved to death on 18 May 526.
- Pope Martin I (Saint) Elected in 649. Died in exile 16 September 655.

== Murdered popes ==
- Pope Pius I (Saint) (c. 142 – c. 154), martyred by the sword according to old sources. Claim of martyrdom removed from the 1969 General Roman Calendar after recent revisions.
- John VIII (872–882), poisoned and then clubbed to death
- Stephen VI (896–897), strangled
- Leo V (903), allegedly strangled
- John X (914–928), allegedly smothered with a pillow
- John XII (955–964), allegedly murdered by the jealous husband of the woman with whom he was in bed
- Benedict VI (973–974), strangled
- John XIV (983–984), died either by starvation, ill-treatment, or direct murder
- Clement II (1046–1047), allegedly poisoned
- Celestine V (1294–1296), allegedly murdered while in post-abdication captivity. Allegations blame his successor, Pope Boniface VIII.
- Boniface VIII (1294–1303) was in conflict with Philip IV of France and was temporarily abducted by his forces. He died one month later, allegedly as a result of ill-treatment during his abduction.

== See also ==
- History of the papacy
- Pope John Paul I conspiracy theories
- Attempted assassination of Pope John Paul II

=== Lists of popes ===
- List of popes
- List of canonised popes
- Pope#Lengths_of_papal_reign
- List of popes from the Borgia family
- List of popes from the Conti family
- List of popes from the Medici family
- List of popes sorted alphabetically
