= Catacomb of Callixtus =

Ancient Roman site

Coordinates: 41°51′32″N 12°30′39″E

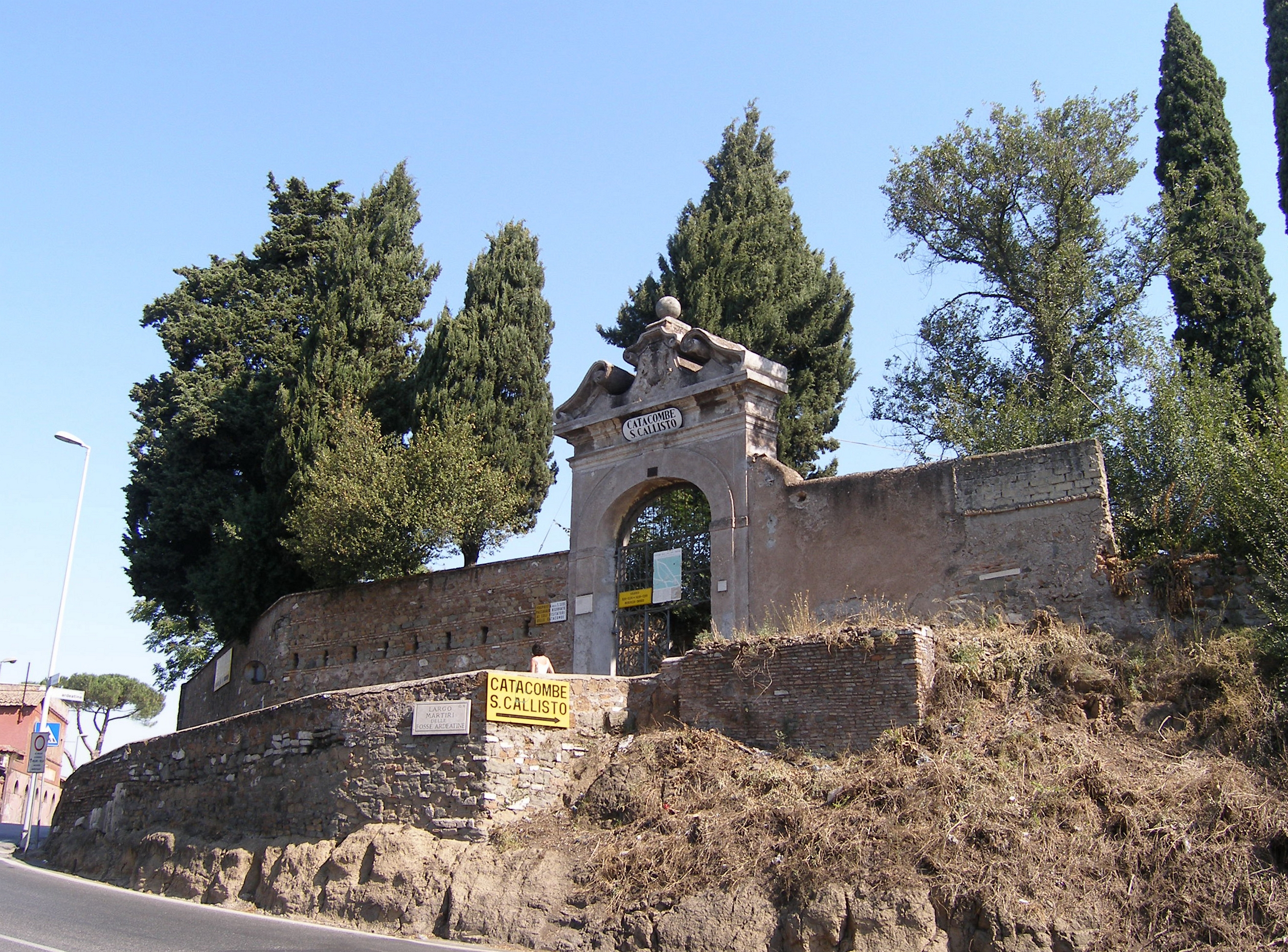
Entrance to the areal of the Catacomb of Callixtus.

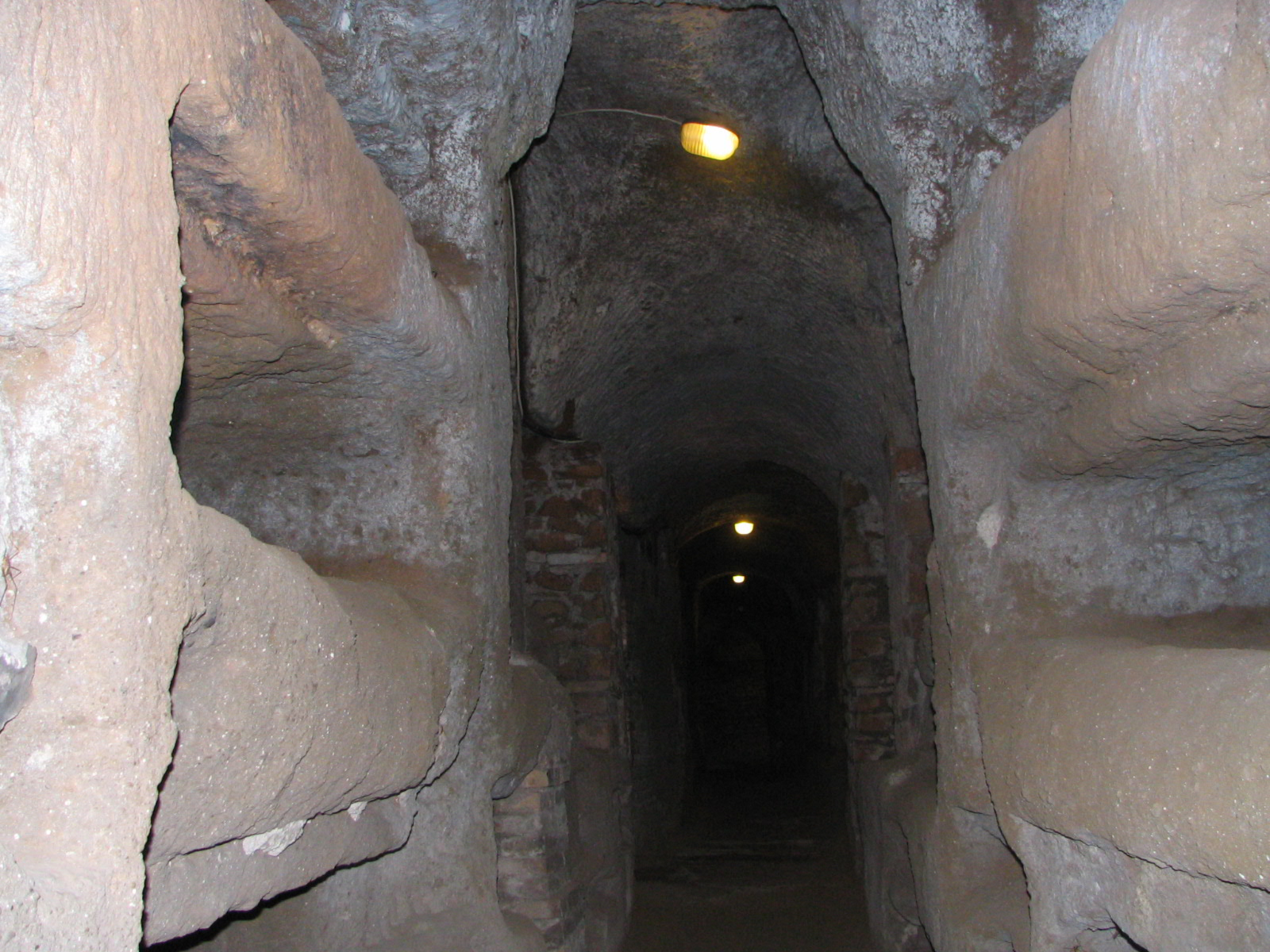
Grave niches in the Catacomb of Callixtus

The Catacomb(s) of Callixtus (also known as the Cemetery of Callixtus) is one of the Catacombs of Rome on the Appian Way, notable for containing the Crypt of the Popes (Italian: Cappella dei Papi), which once contained the tombs of several popes from the 2nd to 4th centuries.

== History ==
The Catacomb is believed to have been created by future Pope Callixtus I, then a deacon of Rome, under the direction of Pope Zephyrinus, enlarging pre-existing early Christian hypogea. Callixtus himself was entombed in the Catacomb of Calepodius on the Aurelian Way. The crypt fell into disuse and decay as the relics it contained were translated from the catacombs to the various churches of Rome; the final wave of translations from the crypt occurred under Pope Sergius II in the 9th century, primarily to San Silvestro in Capite, which unlike the Catacomb was within the Aurelian Walls. The Catacomb and Crypt were rediscovered in 1854 by the pioneering Italian archaeologist Giovanni Battista de Rossi.

== Description ==
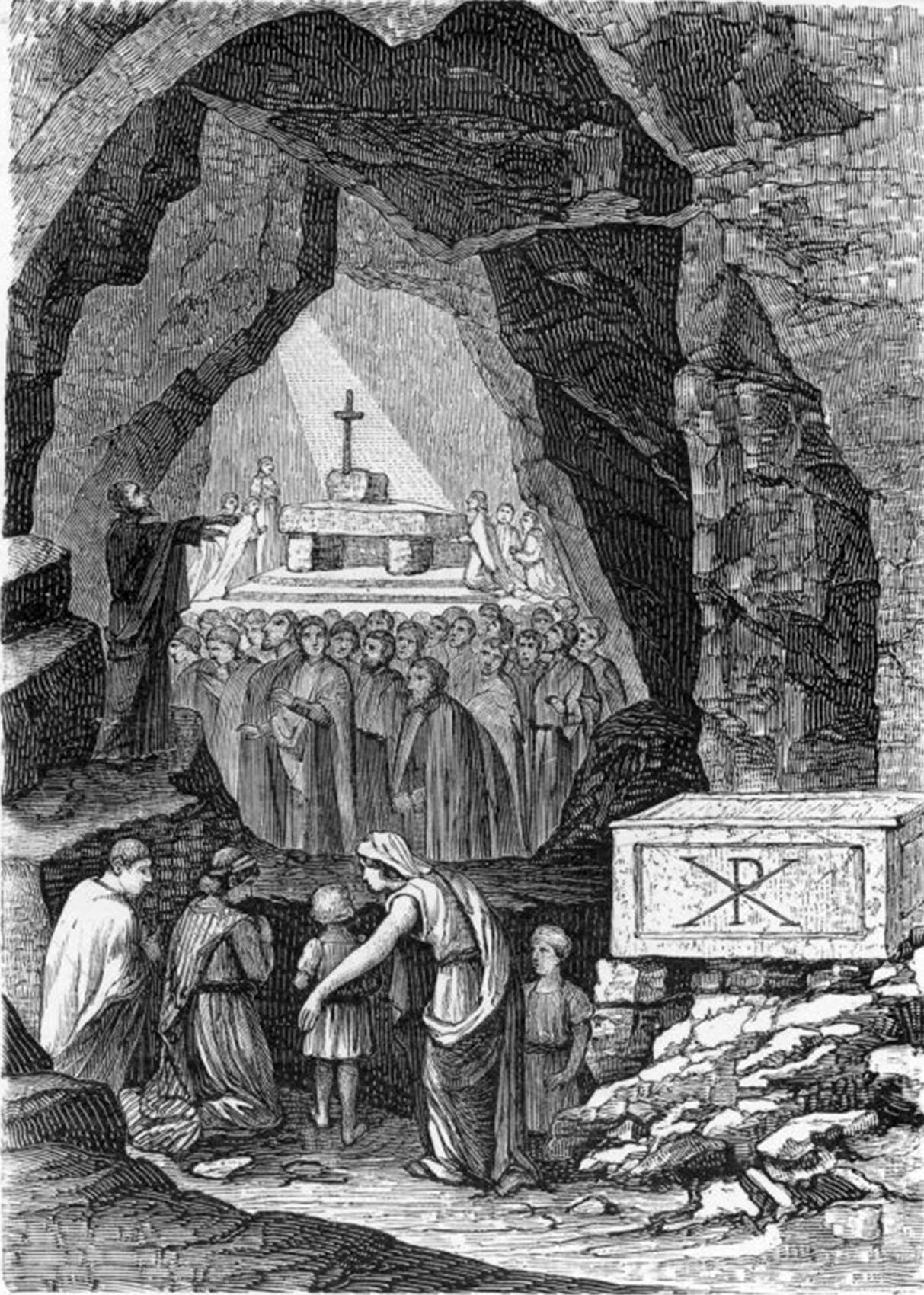
Christians celebrating Liturgy in the catacombs.

The catacomb forms part of an ancient funerary complex, the Complesso Callistiano, that occupies thirty hectares. The boundaries of this are taken as being the Via Appia Antica, the Via Ardeatina and the Vicolo delle Sette Chiese. The area of the catacomb proper is about fifteen hectares, and it goes down for five levels. A rough estimate puts the length of passageways at about twenty kilometres, and the occupancy at about half a million bodies.

This catacomb's most ancient parts are the crypt of Lucina, the region of the Popes and the region of Saint Cecilia, where some of the most sacred memories of the place are preserved (including the crypt of the Popes, the crypt of Saint Cecilia, and the crypt of the Sacraments); the other regions are named the region of Saint Gaius and the region of Saint Eusebius (end of the 3rd century), West region (built in the first half of the 4th century) and the Liberian region (second half of the 4th century), all showing grandiose underground architecture. A modern staircase, on the site of an ancient one, was built by Pope Damasus I, giving access to the region of the Popes, in which is to be found the Crypt of the Popes, where nine pontiffs and, perhaps, eight representatives of the ecclesiastical hierarchy had been buried – along its walls are the original Greek inscriptions for the pontiffs Pontian, Anterus, Fabian, Lucius I and Eutychian. In the far wall Pope Sixtus II was also buried, after he was killed during the persecution of Valerian; in front of his tomb Pope Damasus had carved an inscription in poetic metre in characters thought up by the calligrapher Furius Dionysius Filocalus.

In the adjoining crypt is the grave of Saint Cecilia, whose relics were removed by Pope Paschal I in 821: the early 9th-century frescoes on the walls represent Saint Cecilia praying, the bust of the Redeemer and Pope Urban I. A short distance away, an arcade dating to the end of the 2nd century gives access to the cubicula of the sacraments, with their frescoes from the first half of the 3rd century hinting at baptism, the Eucharist and the resurrection of the flesh; in the region of Saint Militiades next door, a child's sarcophagus has a front sculpted with biblical episodes. In the region of Saints Gaius and Eusebius are some crypts set apart, opposite each other, with the tombs of Pope Gaius (with an inscription) and Pope Eusebius, who died in Sicily where he had been exiled by Maxentius and whose body was translated to Rome during the pontificate of Militiades; on a marble copy of the end of the 4th century (of which fragments may be seen on the opposite wall) may be read of an inscription by Damasus which highlights Eusebius' role in the resolution of schism in the early church, particularly as it related to the acceptance of apostates.

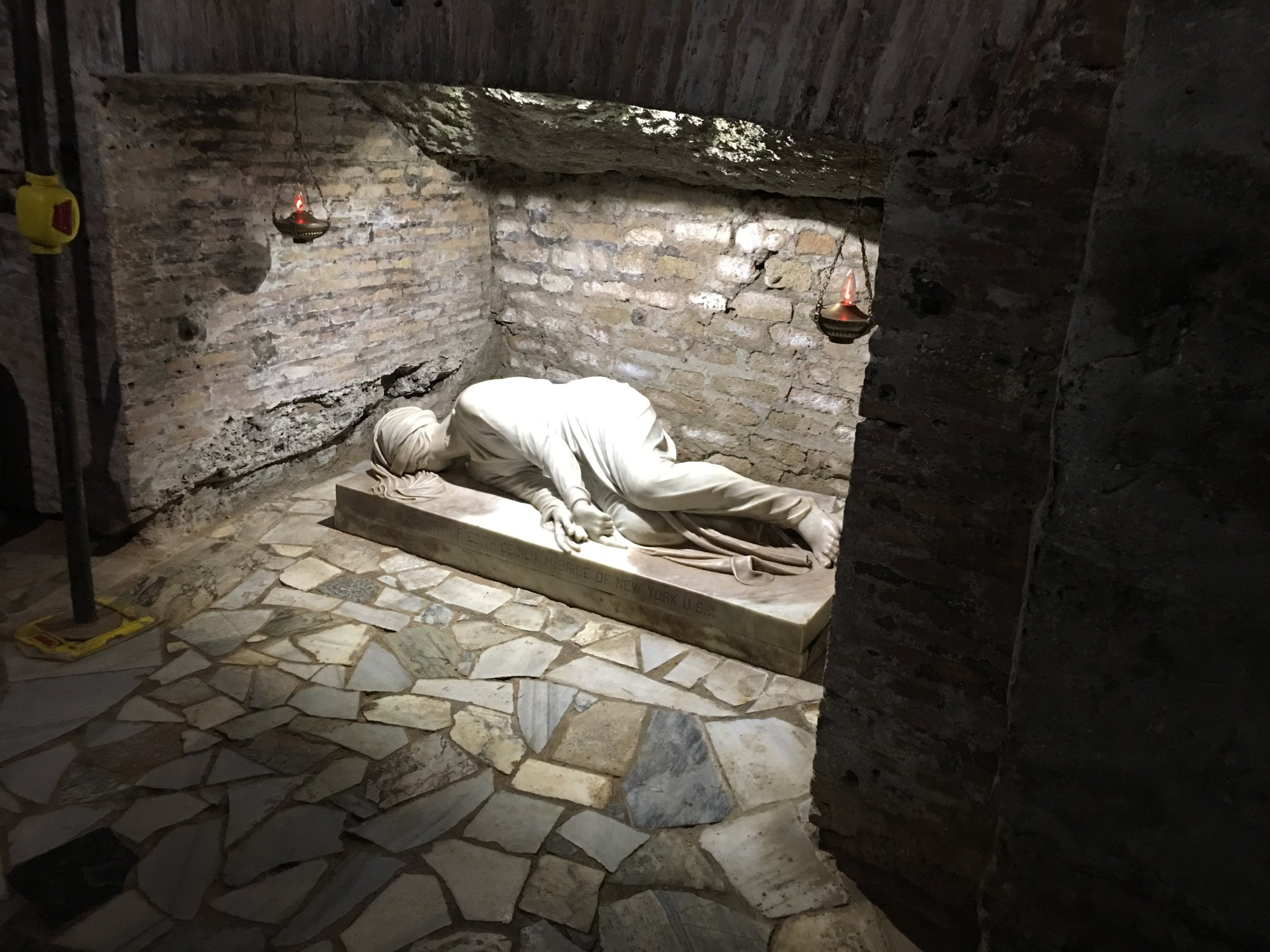
Grave of St. Cecilia, March, 2018.

Along "passage O" north of the Crypt of the Popes are, in succession, the crypt of the martyrs Calogerus and Parthenius and the double cubiculum of Severus, which contains a rhythmic inscription (dated to no later than 304) in which a bishop of Rome (at that time Marcellinus) is first called pope and first openly professes belief in the final resurrection. In a region further from there, the so-called "Crypt of Lucina", is the burial of Pope Cornelius, whose tomb still has its original inscription giving him the title of martyr and, on its sides, splendid paintings with figures in 7th and 8th century Byzantine style representing popes Sixtus II and Cornelius and the African bishops Cyprian and Ottatus. In a nearby cubiculum are some of the most ancient burials, after AD 175, with Roman frescoes of (on the ceiling) the Good Shepherd and orantes and (on the far wall) two fish with a basket of loaves behind it, a symbol of the Eucharist.

== Papal tombs ==
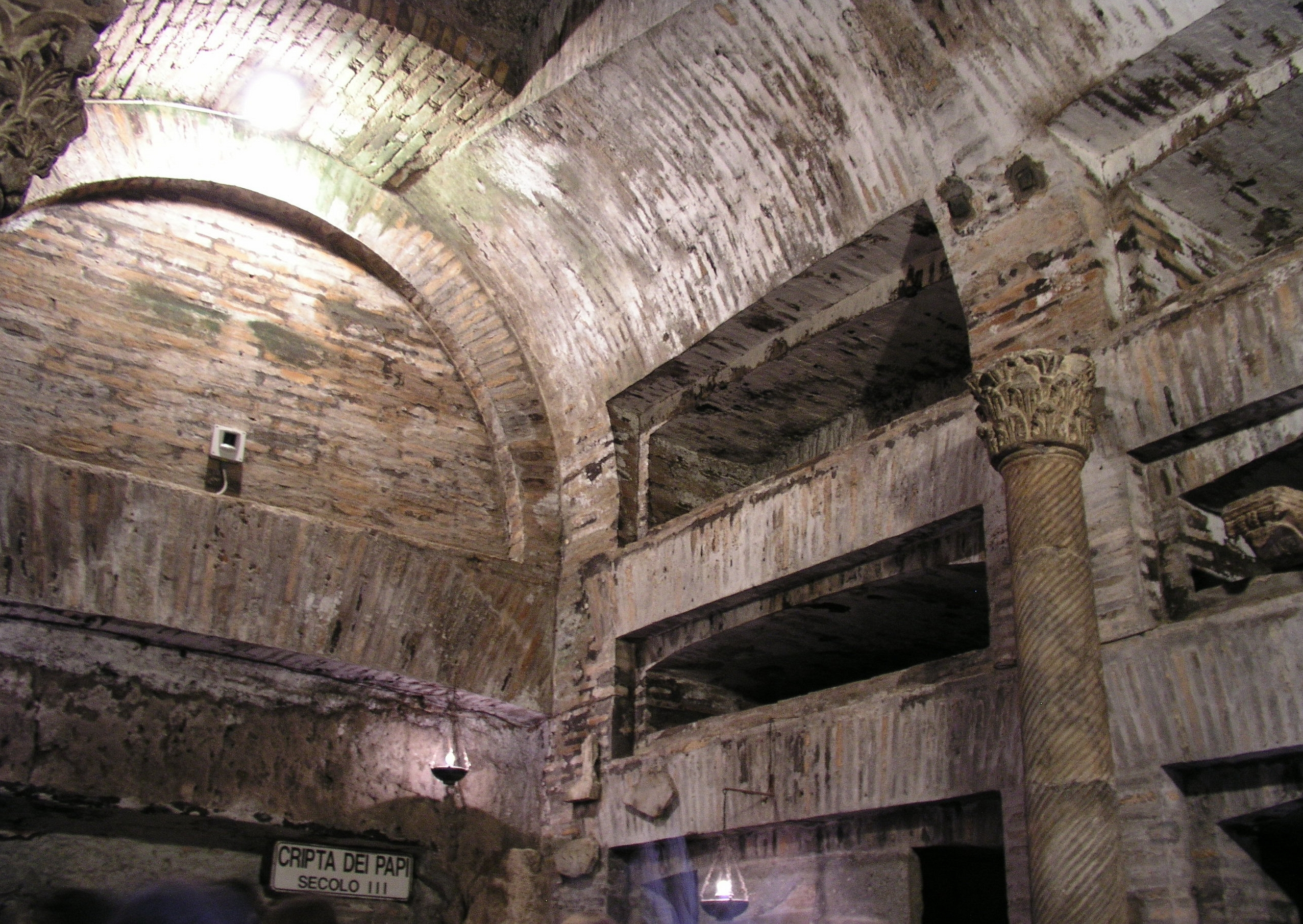
The Crypt of the Popes

At its peak, the 15-hectare (37-acre) site would have held the remains of 16 popes and 50 martyrs. Nine of those popes were buried in the Crypt of the Popes itself, to which Pope Damasus I built a staircase in the 4th century. Among the discovered Greek language inscriptions are those associated with: Pope Pontian, Pope Anterus, Pope Fabian, Pope Lucius I, and Pope Eutychian. A more lengthy inscription to Pope Sixtus II by Furius Dionisius Filocalus has also been discovered.

Outside the Crypt of the Popes, the region of Saints Gaius and Eusebius is so named for the facing tombs of Pope Gaius ("Caius") and Pope Eusebius (translated from Sicily). In another region, there is a tomb attributed to Pope Cornelius, bearing the inscription "CORNELIVS MARTYR", also attributed to Filocalus.

A plaque placed by Pope Sixtus III (c. 440) lists the following popes: Sixtus II, Dionysius, Cornelius, Felix, Pontianus, Fabianus, Gaius, Eusebius, Melchiades, Stephen, Urban I, Lucius, and Anterus, a list not including any 2nd century tombs. The Crypt of the Popes quickly filled in the 4th century, causing other popes to be buried in related catacombs, such as the Catacomb of Priscilla, the Catacomb of Balbina (only Pope Mark), the Catacomb of Calepodius (only Pope Callixtus I and Pope Julius I), the Catacomb of Pontian (only Pope Anastasius I and Pope Innocent I, father and son), and the Catacomb of Felicitas (only Pope Boniface I).

=== 2nd century ===
Pontificate	Portrait	Common English name	Pre-Callixtus translations	Location within Callixtus	Post-Callixtus translations	Notes
155–166		Anicetus; Saint Anicetus	Vatican Hill (some sources say he was originally buried in the Catacomb of Callixtus)	Unknown	Altemps Palace (Piazza Navona)	Sarcophagus which may have once contained remains is extant in the Altemps Palace
c. 166–174/175		Soter; Saint Soter	None	Unknown	San Silvestro in Capite; San Sisto Vecchio; Toledo, Spain; San Martino ai Monti	Possibly never buried in Catacomb of Callixtus and confused with a martyr buried in 304
199–217		Zephyrinus; Saint Zephyrin	Private cemetery ("in cymiterio suo")	Not in the Crypt of the Popes	San Silvestro in Capite	First pope buried in the Catacomb, which he ordered Callixtus to organize

=== 3rd century ===
Pontificate	Portrait	Common English name	Pre-Callixtus translations	Location within Callixtus	Post-Callixtus translations	Notes
222/223–230		Urban I Saint Urban	None	Unknown (see notes)	None known	Not to be confused with a non-Roman bishop Urban buried in the catacomb of Praetextatus; slab in Crypt of the Popes bears the Greek words: OYPBANOC E[ΠΙCΚΟΠΟC] ("Urban, Bishop"), but identification is not certain
21 July 230 – 28 September 235		Pontian; Saint Pontian	Sardinia	Crypt of the Popes	None known	Translated from Sardinia (the "Isle of Death") by Pope Fabian in 237, buried in the papal crypt on November 12; two extant engravings: ΠONTIANOC EΠI[CΚΟΠΟC] M[ΑΡΤΥ]Ρ ("Pontianus Bi[shop] M[arty]r"); and ΕΝθΕΩΝ [ΑΓΙΩΝ ΕΠΙCΚΟΠΩΝ] ΠΟΝΤΙΑΝΕ ΖΗϹΗϹ ("Mayest thou live, Pontianus, in God with all")
21 November 235 – 3 January 236		Anterus; Saint Anterus	None	Crypt of the Popes	San Silvestro in Capite	Possibly the first pope in the Crypt of the Popes; inscription reads ΑΝΘΕΡΩϹ EΠI[CΚΟΠΟC] ("Anterus, Bishop") and is broken such that it could have once mentioned him as a martyr
10 January 236 – 20 January 250		Fabian; Saint Fabian	None	Crypt of the Popes	San Martino ai Monti; Old St. Peter's Basilica; San Sebastiano fuori le mura	Greek inscription from the Catacomb of Callixtus is extant; translated to San Martino by Sergius II (Liber Pontificalis) or combined with Sixtus II in Old St. Peter's (Petrus Mallius); sarcophagus inscribed with ΦΑΒΙΑΝΟϹ ΕΠΙ[CΚΟΠΟC] Μ[ΑΡΤΥ]Ρ ("Phabianos Bi[shop] M[arty]r") in San Sebastiano fuori le mura
25 June 253 – 5 March 254		Lucius I Saint Lucius	None	Crypt of the Popes	Santa Cecilia in Trastevere; San Silvestro in Capite; Santa Prassede	Extant inscription reads "Lucius, Bishop" (Greek: ΛΟΥΚΙϹ) sarcophagus that once held remains is extant in Santa Cecilia in Trastevere
30/31 August 257 – 6 August 258		Sixtus II; Saint Sixtus II	None	Crypt of the Popes	Old St. Peter's Basilica; San Sisto Vecchio	Translated from the Catacomb of Callixtus to Old Saint Peter's by Paschal I; translated from Old Saint Peter's to San Sisto Vecchio by Leo IV; lengthy epitaph discovered in the Catacomb of Callixtus
22 July 259 – 26 December 268		Dionysius; Saint Dionysius	None	Crypt of the Popes	San Silvestre in Capite	Alleged relics of Popes Sylvester I, Stephen I, and Dionysius were exhumed and enshrined beneath the high altar of San Silvestro in Capite in 1601; no archaeological evidence in the Catacomb of Callixtus
5 January 269 – 30 December 274		Felix I Saint Felix	None	Crypt of the Popes	None known	According to legend buried in the "Cemetery of the Two Felixes", which has never been located
4 January 275 – 7 December 283		Eutychian; Saint Eutychian	None	Crypt of the Popes	Abbey of Luni (Sarzana); Sarzana Cathedral	Last pope buried in the Crypt of the Popes; inscription reads: EYTYXIANOC EΠΙC[KOΠOC] ("Eutychian, Bishop")
17 December 283 – 22 April 296		Caius; Saint Caius	None	Crypt of St. Eusebius	San Silvestro in Capite; Church built over his original house Sant'Andrea della Valle (Barberini chapel)	Inscription reads: Γ[AIO]Y EΠI[ϹΚΟΠΟΥ] / ΚΑ[TA]Θ[ECIC] / [ΠΡΟ I] ΚΑΛ MAIΩ[N] ("The deposition of Caius, Bishop, the 22nd day of April")

=== 4th century ===
Pontificate	Portrait	Common English name	Pre-Callixtus translations	Location within Callixtus	Post-Callixtus translations	Notes
c. 309 – c. 310		Eusebius; Saint Eusebius	Sicily	Crypt of St. Eusebius	None known	Inscription and lengthy epitaph extant
2 July 311 – 11 January 314		Miltiades; Melchiades; Saint Miltiades	None	Unknown	San Silvestre in Capite	Only pope entombed in the Catacomb of Callixtus during the "long peace"; buried in a large sarcophagus with a roof-shaped cover
1 October 366 – 11 December 384		Damasus I Saint Damasus	None	Unknown	Old St. Peter's Basilica; San Lorenzo in Damaso	Buried with his mother, Laurentia, and sister, Irene; sarcophagus inscription extant; head allegedly in a reliquary donated by Clement VIII to St. Peter's

== Paintings ==
The tomb contains early paintings with Christian themes. In the early 20th century, researchers began to photograph and make colored photographs of the paintings. Joseph Wilpert (1857-1944) directed photographs to be taken by "Pompeo Sansaini, accompanied by his son Renato." These were printed on salted paper and hand colored with watercolors by Carlo Tabanelli, who sat in front of the artworks in the catacombs to accurately reproduce the colors. Approximately 600 of these photographed, hand colored paintings exist today.

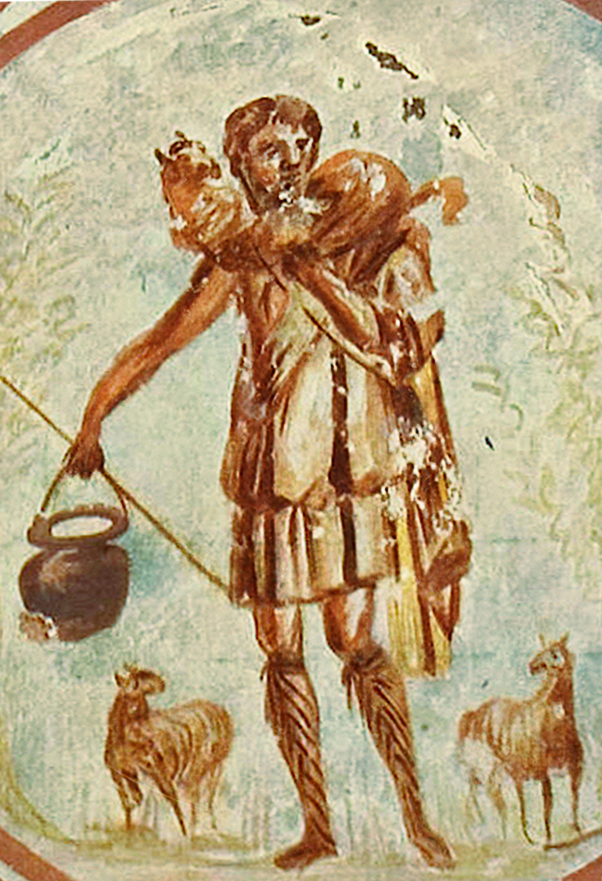
Circa 250-300 A.D. The Good Shepherd, Callixitus Catacomb, Crypt of Lucina. The pail (of milk?) carried by the Shepherd has been seen as symbolizing the Eucharist.

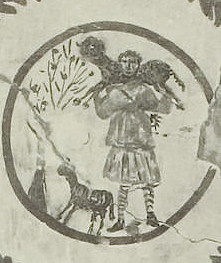
Late 2nd century A.D. Jesus as the Good Shepard, Crypt of Lucina.

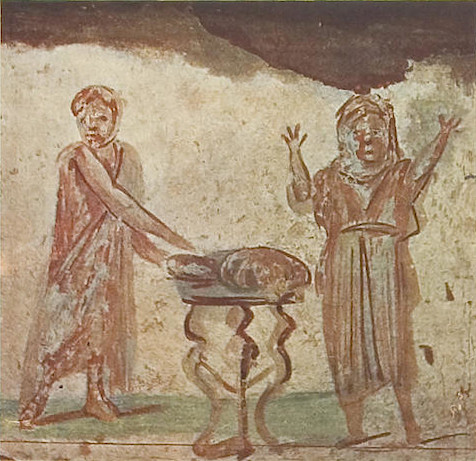
Wilpert's photo of a 3rd century fresco in one of the Sacrament Chapels, Catacomb of Callistus. Christ, clad in the philosopher's pallium, consecrates fish and bread (symbol of the Eucharist); an orans stands beside the tripod.

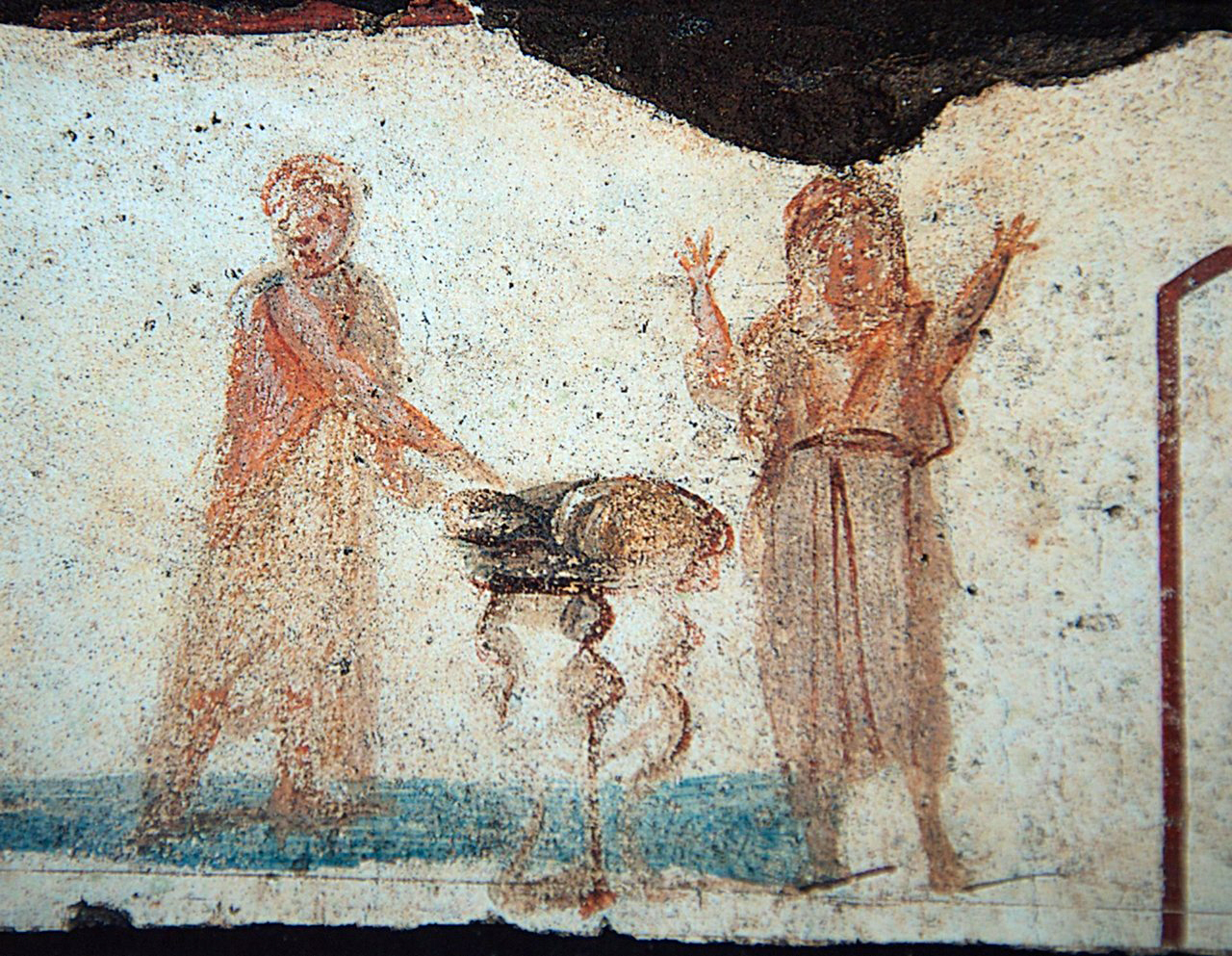
Modern color photograph for comparison.

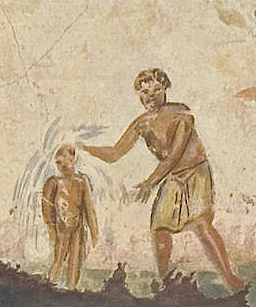
Baptism

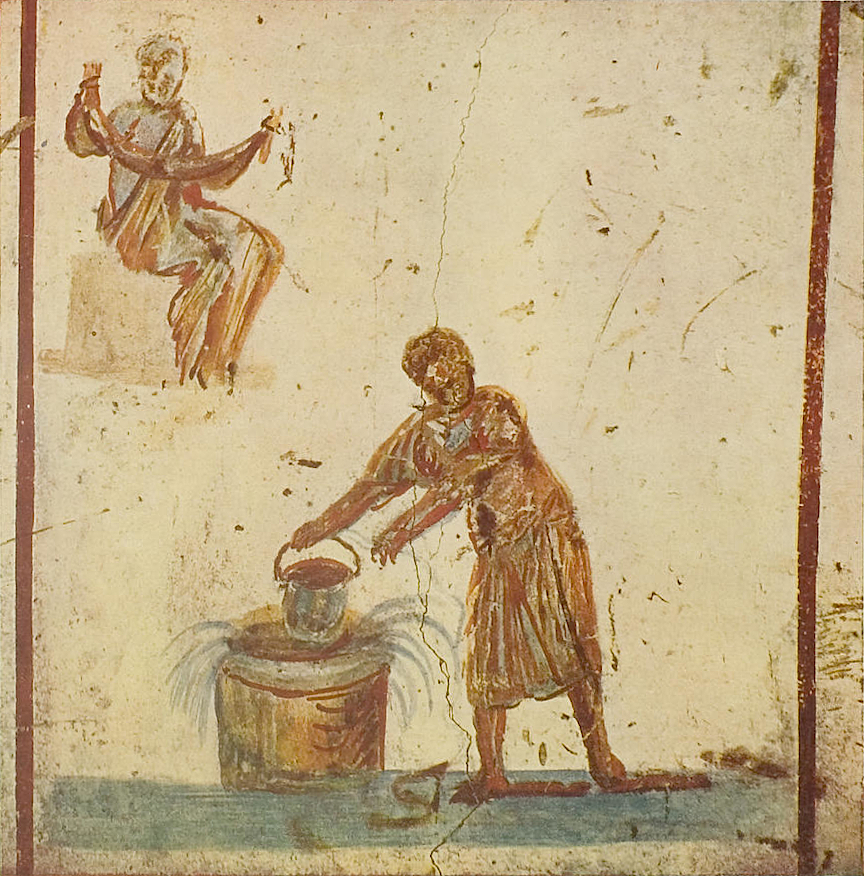
Christ and the Samaritan woman drawing water

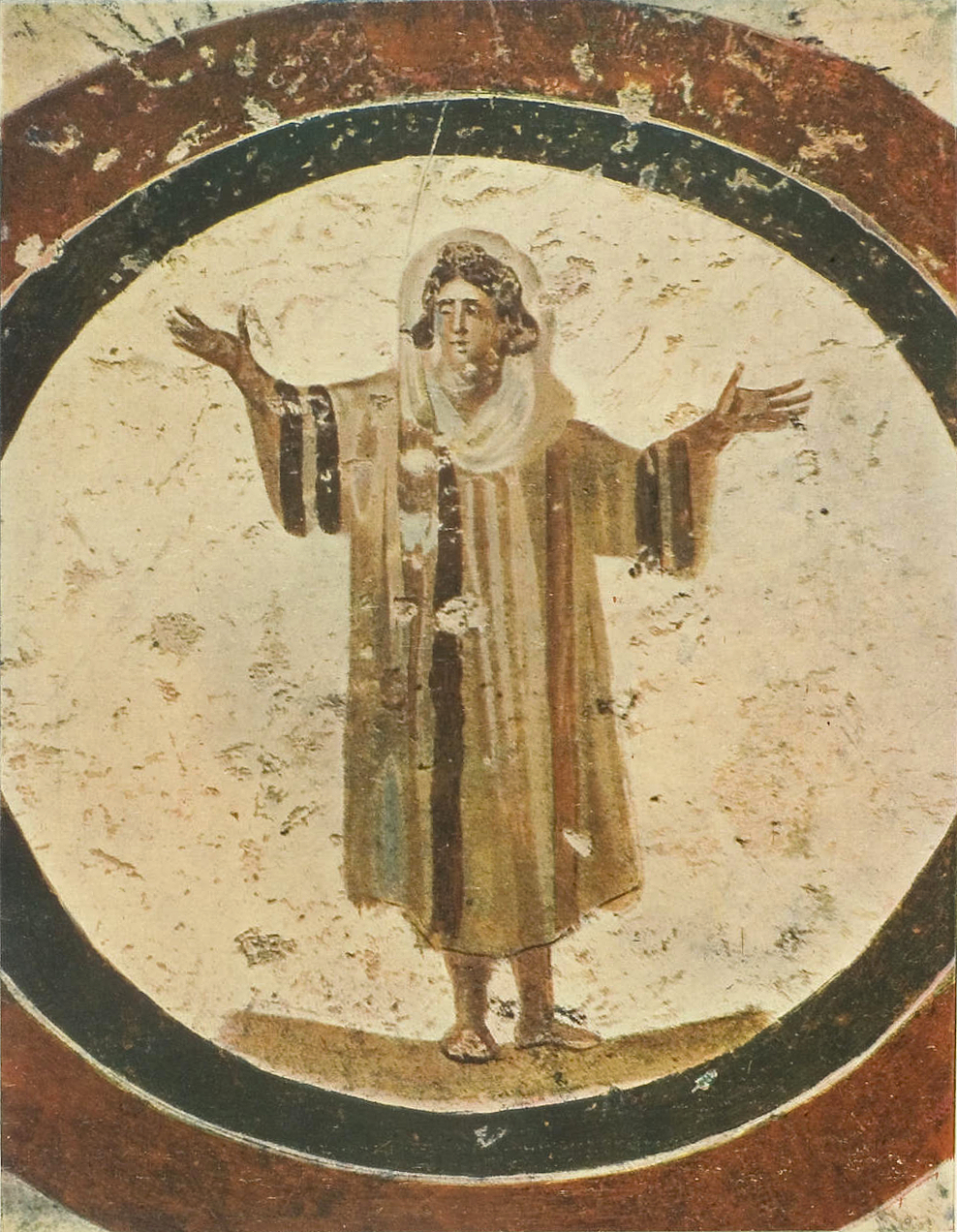
Man praying in orans position

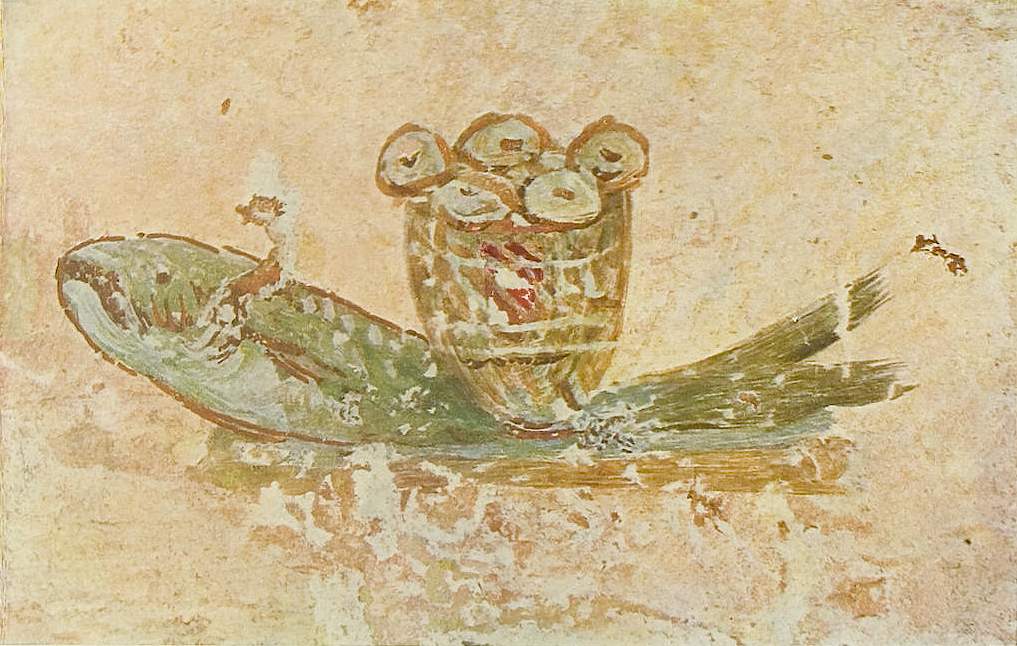
Loaves of bread and fish (symbols of the Eucharist)

== In popular culture ==
In the novel Ben-Hur: A Tale of the Christ by Lew Wallace, Judah Ben-Hur, along with his wife Esther and Malluch, decide to donate their fortunes to the Christian community in Rome. The donations are eventually used to help build the catacombs.

In the novel The Marble Faun by Nathaniel Hawthorne, chapters 3 and 4 describe a visit to the catacomb. As it was published in 1860, this is an early literary description of the recently discovered site.

== See also ==
- List of ancient monuments in Rome
