= List of canonised popes =

Popes officially recognized as saints

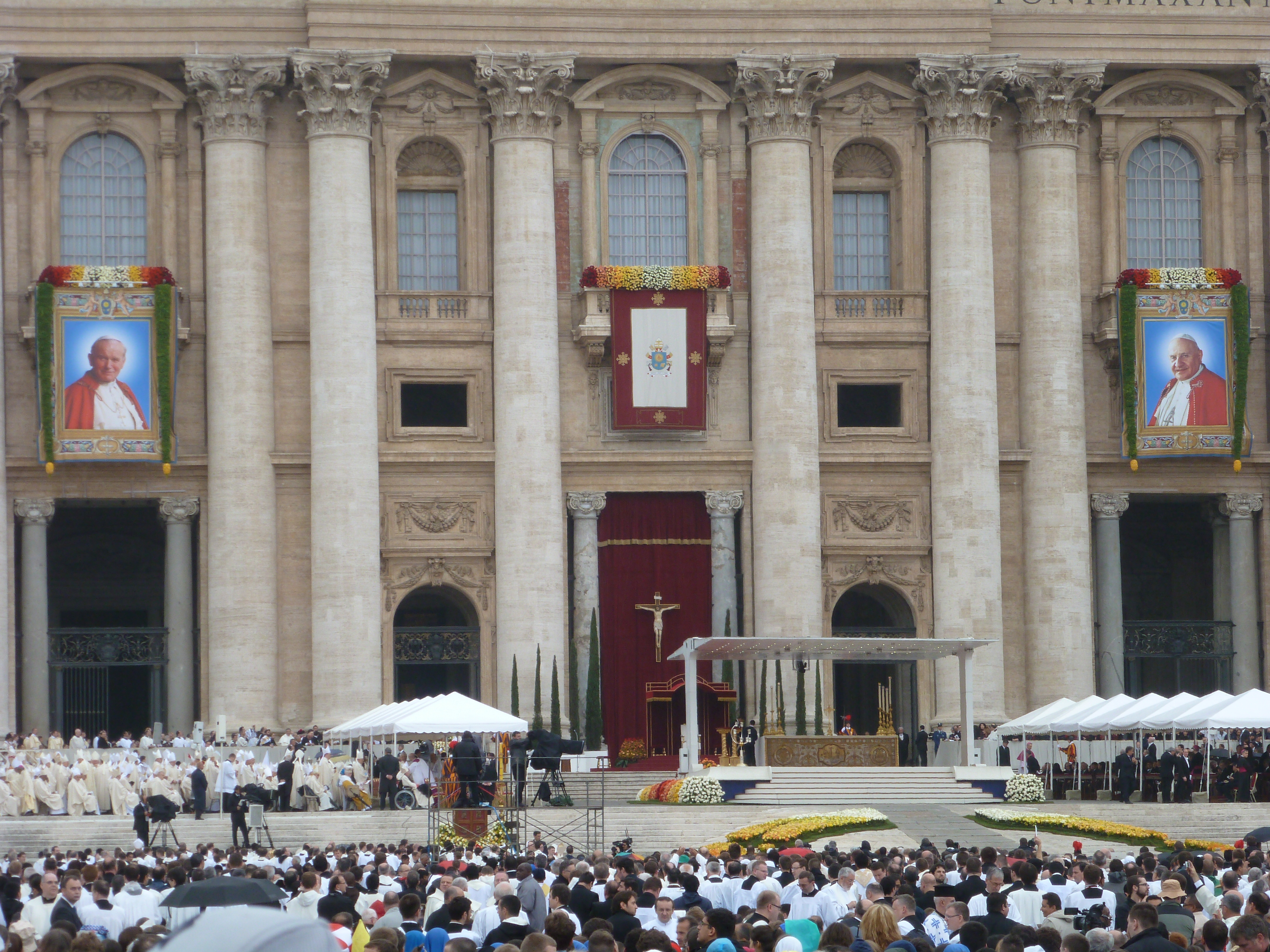
In 2014, Popes John XXIII and John Paul II were canonised. This was the first time in the Catholic Church that two popes were canonised at once.

A total of 81 out of 266 deceased popes have been recognised universally as canonised saints, including all of the first 35 popes (31 of whom were martyrs) and 52 of the first 54. If Pope Liberius is numbered amongst the saints as in Eastern Christianity, all of the first 49 popes become recognised as saints, of whom 31 are martyr-saints, and 53 of the first 54 pontiffs would be acknowledged as saints. In addition, 13 other popes are in the process of becoming canonised saints: as of December 2018, two are recognised as being Servants of God, one is recognised as being Venerable, and 10 have been declared Blessed or Beati, making a total of 95 (96 if Pope Adeodatus II is recognised a saint) of the 266 Roman pontiffs being recognised and venerated for their heroic virtues and inestimable contributions to the Church.

The most recently reigning Pope to have been canonised was Pope John Paul II, whose cause for canonisation was opened in May 2005. John Paul II was beatified on 1 May 2011, by Pope Benedict XVI and later canonised, along with Pope John XXIII, by Pope Francis on 27 April 2014. Pope Francis also canonised Pope Paul VI on 14 October 2018.

== Saints ==
| Name | Papacy began | Notes |
|---|---|---|
| Pope Adeodatus I | 615 | |
| Pope Adrian III | 884 | Canonised in 1891 by Pope Leo XIII |
| Pope Agapetus I | 535 | |
| Pope Agatho | 678 | |
| Pope Alexander I | 107 | |
| Pope Anacletus | 79 | |
| Pope Anastasius I | 399 | |
| Pope Anicetus | 157 | |
| Pope Anterus | 235 | |
| Pope Benedict II | 684 | |
| Pope Boniface I | 418 | |
| Pope Boniface IV | 608 | |
| Pope Caius | 283 | |
| Pope Callixtus I | 218 | |
| Pope Celestine I | 422 | |
| Pope Celestine V | 1294 | Canonised in 1313 by Pope Clement V |
| Pope Clement I | 88 | |
| Pope Cornelius | 251 | |
| Pope Damasus I | 366 | |
| Pope Dionysius | 259 | |
| Pope Eleuterus | 174 | |
| Pope Eugene I | 654 | |
| Pope Eusebius | 310 | |
| Pope Eutychian | 275 | |
| Pope Evaristus | 99 | |
| Pope Fabian | 236 | |
| Pope Felix I | 269 | |
| Pope Felix III | 483 | |
| Pope Felix IV | 526 | |
| Pope Gelasius I | 492 | |
| Pope Gregory I (the Great) | 590 | |
| Pope Gregory II | 715 | |
| Pope Gregory III | 731 | |
| Pope Gregory VII | 1073 | Canonised in 1728 by Pope Benedict XIII |
| Pope Hilarius | 461 | |
| Pope Hormisdas | 514 | |
| Pope Hyginus | 136 | |
| Pope Innocent I | 401 | |
| Pope John I | 523 | |
| Pope John XXIII | 1958 | Canonised in 2014 by Pope Francis |
| Pope John Paul II | 1978 | Canonised in 2014 by Pope Francis |
| Pope Julius I | 337 | |
| Pope Leo I (the Great) | 440 | |
| Pope Leo II | 682 | |
| Pope Leo III | 795 | |
| Pope Leo IV | 847 | |
| Pope Leo IX | 1049 | Canonised in 1082 by Pope Gregory VII |
| Pope Linus | 67 | |
| Pope Lucius I | 253 | |
| Pope Marcellinus | 296 | |
| Pope Marcellus I | 308 | |
| Pope Mark | 336 | |
| Pope Martin I | 649 | |
| Pope Miltiades | 311 | |
| Pope Nicholas I (the Great) | 858 | |
| Pope Paschal I | 817 | |
| Pope Paul I | 757 | |
| Pope Paul VI | 1963 | Canonised in 2018 by Pope Francis |
| Pope Peter (Apostle) | 30/33 | |
| Pope Pius I | 140 | |
| Pope Pius V | 1566 | Canonised in 1712 by Pope Clement XI |
| Pope Pius X | 1903 | Canonised in 1954 by Pope Pius XII |
| Pope Pontian | 230 | |
| Pope Sergius I | 687 | |
| Pope Silverius | 536 | |
| Pope Simplicius | 468 | |
| Pope Siricius | 384 | |
| Pope Sixtus I | 115 | |
| Pope Sixtus II | 257 | |
| Pope Sixtus III | 432 | |
| Pope Soter | 167 | |
| Pope Stephen I | 254 | |
| Pope Sylvester I | 314 | |
| Pope Symmachus | 498 | |
| Pope Telesphorus | 126 | |
| Pope Urban I | 222 | |
| Pope Victor I | 189 | |
| Pope Vitalian | 657 | |
| Pope Zachary | 741 | |
| Pope Zephyrinus | 199 | |
| Pope Zosimus | 417 | |

== Blesseds ==
10 Pontiffs have been beatified as to date. Pope John Paul I has had the most recent reign, as well as beatification.

| Name | Papacy began | Notes |
|---|---|---|
| Pope Benedict XI | 1303 | Beatified in 1736 by Pope Clement XII |
| Pope Eugene III | 1145 | Beatified in 1872 by Pope Pius IX |
| Pope Gregory X | 1271 | Beatified in 1713 by Pope Clement XI |
| Pope Innocent V | 1276 | Beatified in 1898 by Pope Leo XIII |
| Pope Innocent XI | 1676 | Beatified in 1956 by Pope Pius XII |
| Pope John Paul I | 1978 | Beatified in 2022 by Pope Francis |
| Pope Pius IX | 1846 | Beatified in 2000 by Pope John Paul II |
| Pope Urban II | 1088 | Beatified in 1881 by Pope Leo XIII |
| Pope Urban V | 1362 | Beatified in 1870 by Pope Pius IX |
| Pope Victor III | 1086 | Beatified in 1887 by Pope Leo XIII |

== Venerables ==
| Name | Papacy began | Notes |
|---|---|---|
| Pope Pius XII | 1939 | Declared Venerable in 2009 by Pope Benedict XVI |

== Servants of God ==
| Name | Papacy began | Notes |
|---|---|---|
| Pope Benedict XIII | 1724 | Declared a Servant of God in 2017 by Pope Francis |
| Pope Pius VII | 1800 | Declared a Servant of God in 2007 by Pope Benedict XVI |

== See also ==
=== Lists ===
- List of popes
- List of popes by length of reign
- List of popes who died violently
- List of popes sorted alphabetically
- List of Sovereigns of the Vatican City State

=== Related topics ===
- Annuario Pontificio
- History of the papacy
- Index of Vatican City-related articles
- Legends surrounding the papacy
- Liber Pontificalis
- Prophecy of the Popes
