= Sarzana Cathedral =

Cathedral in Sarzana, Liguria, Italy

Coordinates: 44°06′44″N 9°57′45″E

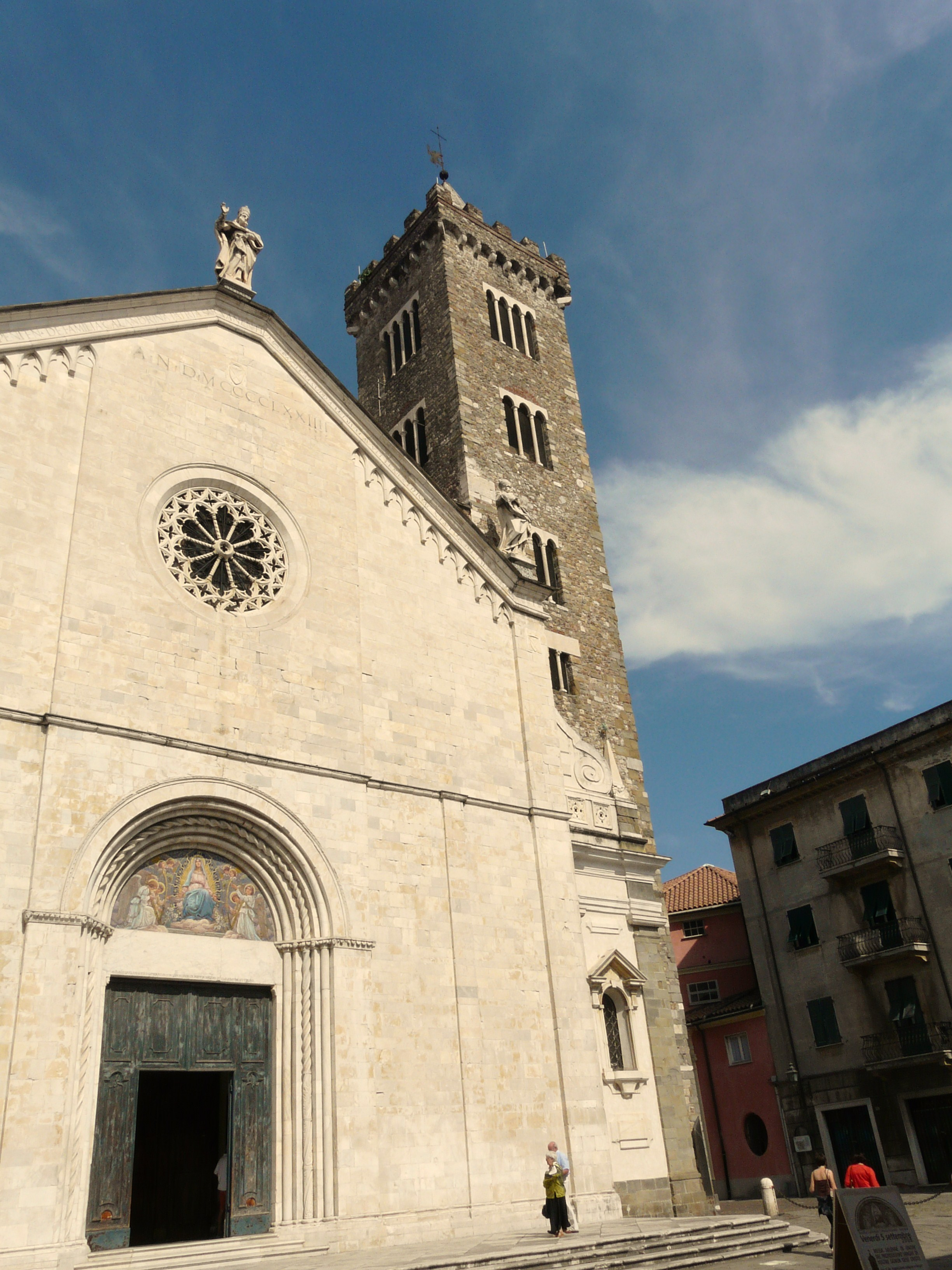
West front and campanile

Sarzana Cathedral (Italian: Concattedrale di Santa Maria Assunta di Sarzana) in Sarzana, Liguria, Italy, is a co-cathedral of the Diocese of La Spezia-Sarzana-Brugnato. It is dedicated to the Assumption of the Virgin Mary. The building is a mixture of the Romanesque and Gothic styles, reflecting the length of the period of its construction, from the early 13th to the late 15th century.

The cathedral is noted as the home of a relic of St Andrew and of the Blood of Christ. There is also an important Romanesque Cross of Maestro Guglielmo of 1138.

== History ==
The cathedral was built on the site of the former pieve of San Basilio and was under construction from 1204 to 1474, when the upper part of the west front was completed by Leonardo Riccomanni of Pietrasanta. In 1735 three statues of popes were added to the top of the façade: Saint Eutychianus in the centre between Pope Sergius IV and Pope Nicholas V.

The cathedral was built as the seat of the Bishop of Luni when it was finally transferred here in 1202 after several previous moves; the bishopric was renamed after Sarzana in 1465. The Diocese of Sarzana was incorporated into the present Diocese of La Spezia-Sarzana-Brugnato (then known as the Diocese of Luni o La Spezia, Sarzana e Brugnato) in 1929.

== Description ==
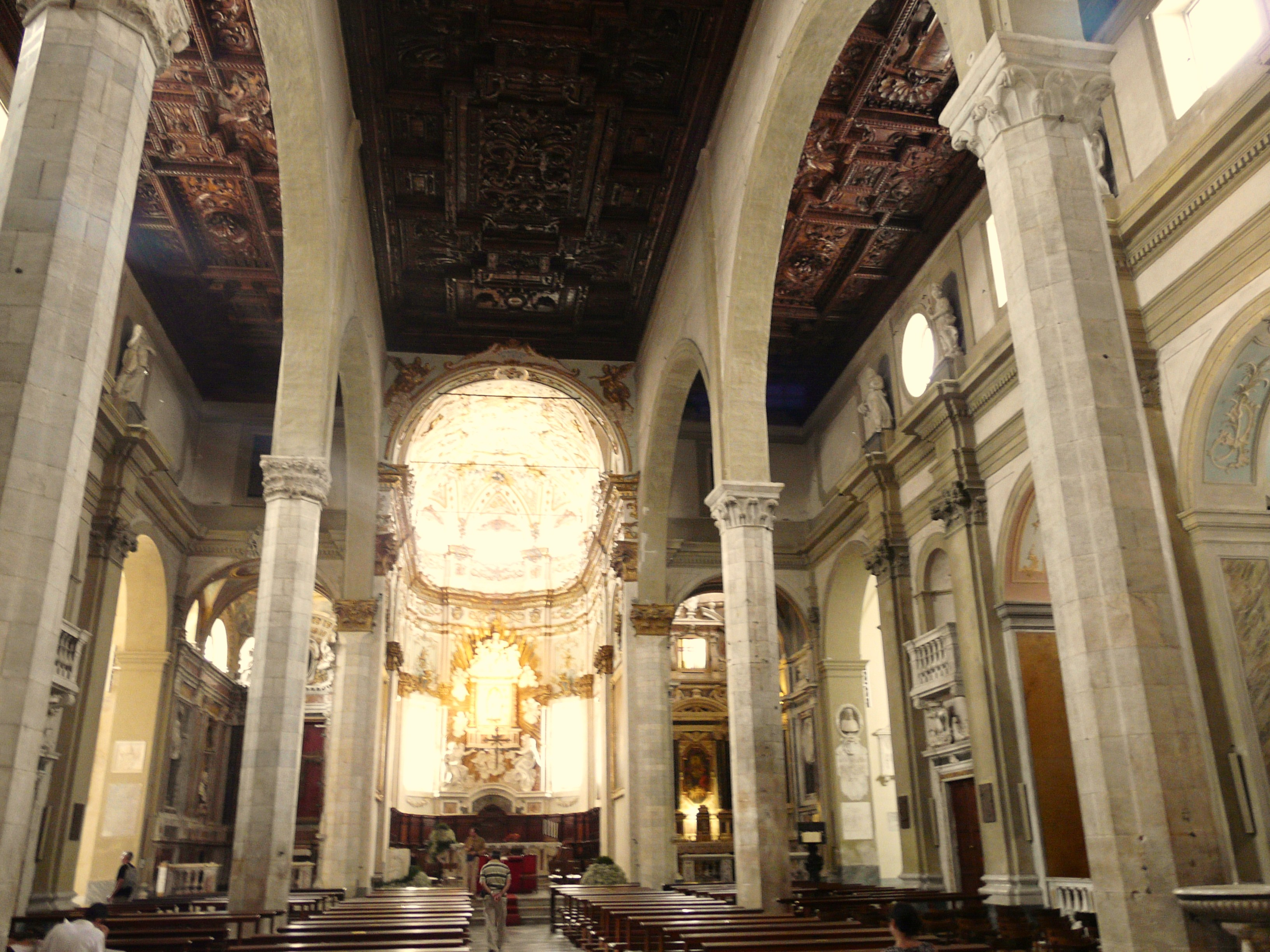
Nave looking east, showing the high arches of the arcades

The church is in a Romanesque-Gothic style. It has a west front of white marble, featuring a portal with a small Gothic rose window above it, between two side blocks of the 17th century. To the south is the battlemented campanile, the sole remnant of the ancient Pieve di San Basilio. The ground plan is in the form of a Latin cross. The nave is divided into three aisles by two arcades of widely spaced polygonal columns supporting high arches. The central nave terminates in the choir and the apse, and the side aisles each terminate in a chapel; all three are roofed by cupolas. To either side of the nave is a row of four side chapels, added in the late 17th century. Each wing of the short transept also contains a chapel. The wooden panelled ceiling was carved by Pietro Giambelli between 1662 and 1670.

== Relics ==
The cathedral contains a famous relic of St Andrew and of the Blood of Christ, which is preserved in the Chapel of the Most Precious Blood (Italian: Cappella del preziosissimo sangue) to the south of the choir and high altar.

== Works of art ==
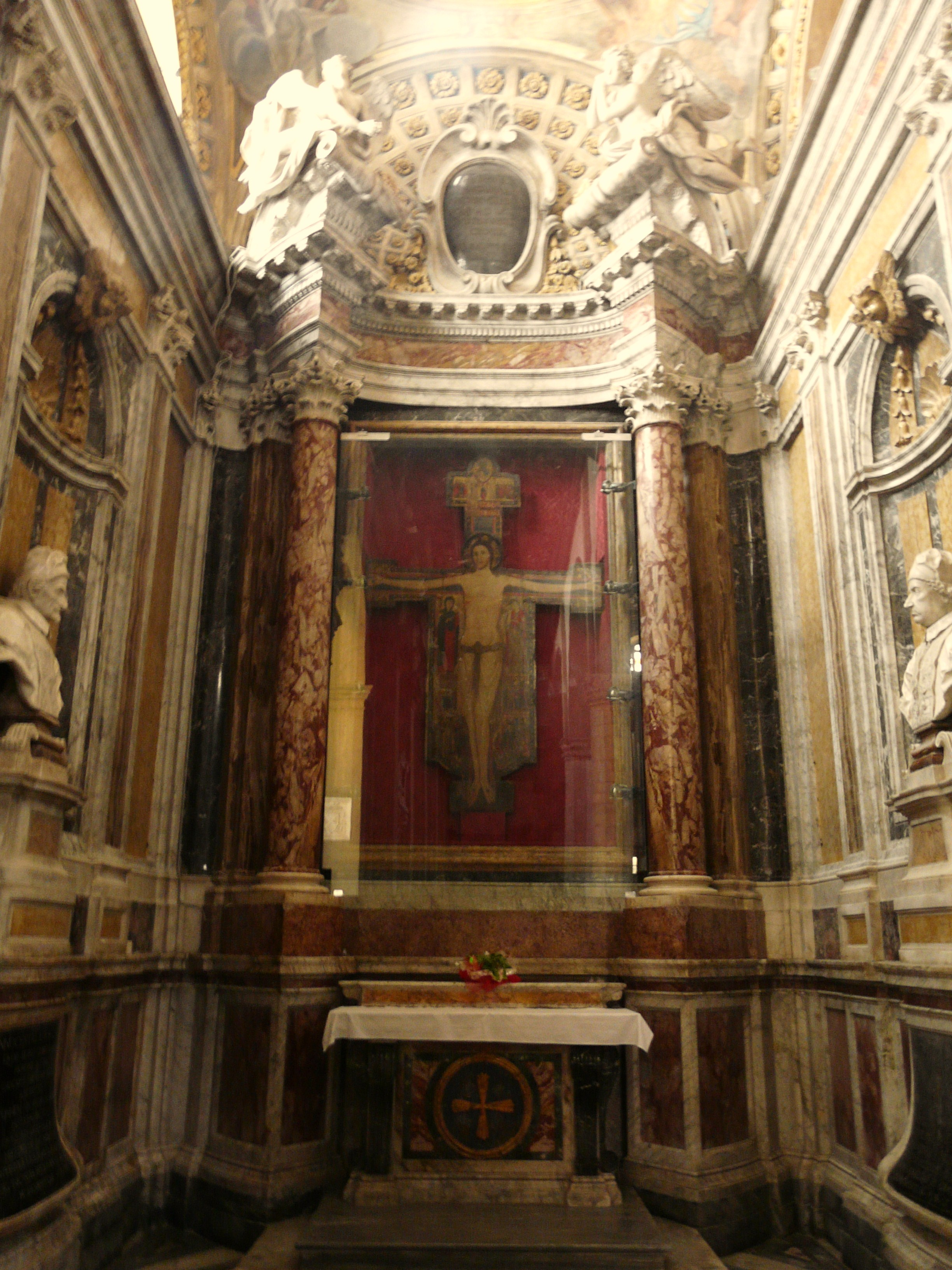
The Cross of Maestro Guglielmo

=== Cross of Maestro Guglielmo ===
Sarzana Cathedral is known as the location of the oldest dated Tuscan crucifix, the Cross of Maestro Guglielmo, dated 1138, a central work of Romanesque painting, despite some re-touching of the face and body in the 14th century. The crucifix is a prime example of the iconography of the Christus triumphans type that preceded the establishment of the iconography of the Christus patiens, which represents a more human and suffering Jesus. The crucifix is now set up in the baroque Chapel of the Cross to the north of the choir and high altar.

=== Other works of art ===
The cathedral contains a painting by Francesco Solimena, Renaissance sculptures including altarpieces of the Purification and the Coronation, by Leonardo and Francesco Riccomanni, a terracotta of the school of Luca Della Robbia and two marble busts, of Pope Clement XI and Pope Innocent XI, by Giovanni Baratta.

The apse contains a Glory of the Virgin, a Baroque scenography reminiscent of Bernini, beneath an elaborate cupola. The 17th-century sculptures in the Chapel of Saint Augustine are by the Carrarese Giovanni Antonio Cybei.

Domenico Fiasella has a number of works in the church, including:

- Glory of the Most Precious Blood in the Chapel of the Relics
- Massacre of the Innocents (1653)
- Martyrdom of St Andrew
- Visitation of Mary to Elizabeth
- Saints Lazarus, Nicholas and George
- Saints Apollonia, Lucia and Cecilia.

== Other ==
The cathedral was declared a basilica minor on 28 November 1947.

== Gallery ==
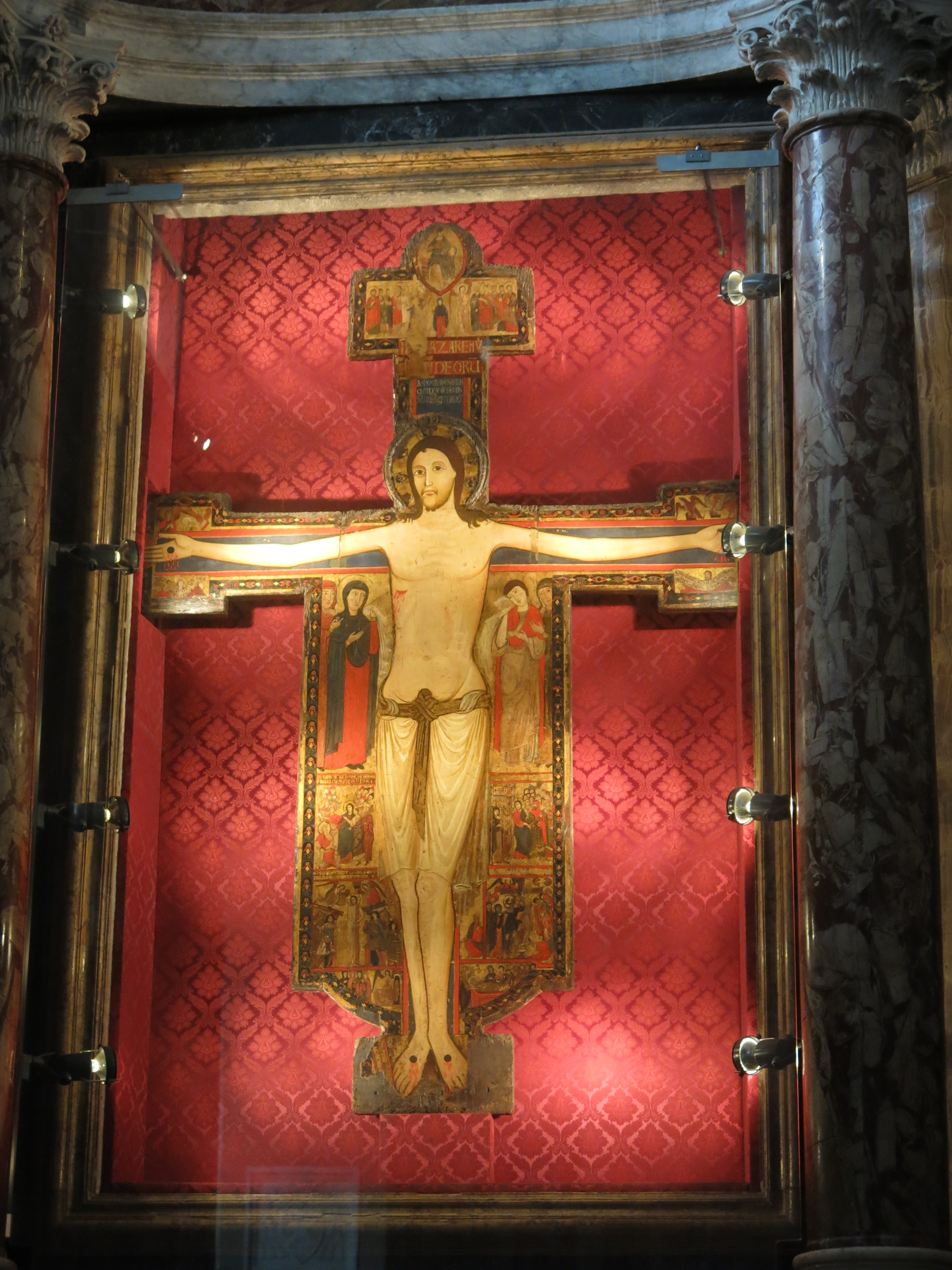
The painted crucifix dated 1138

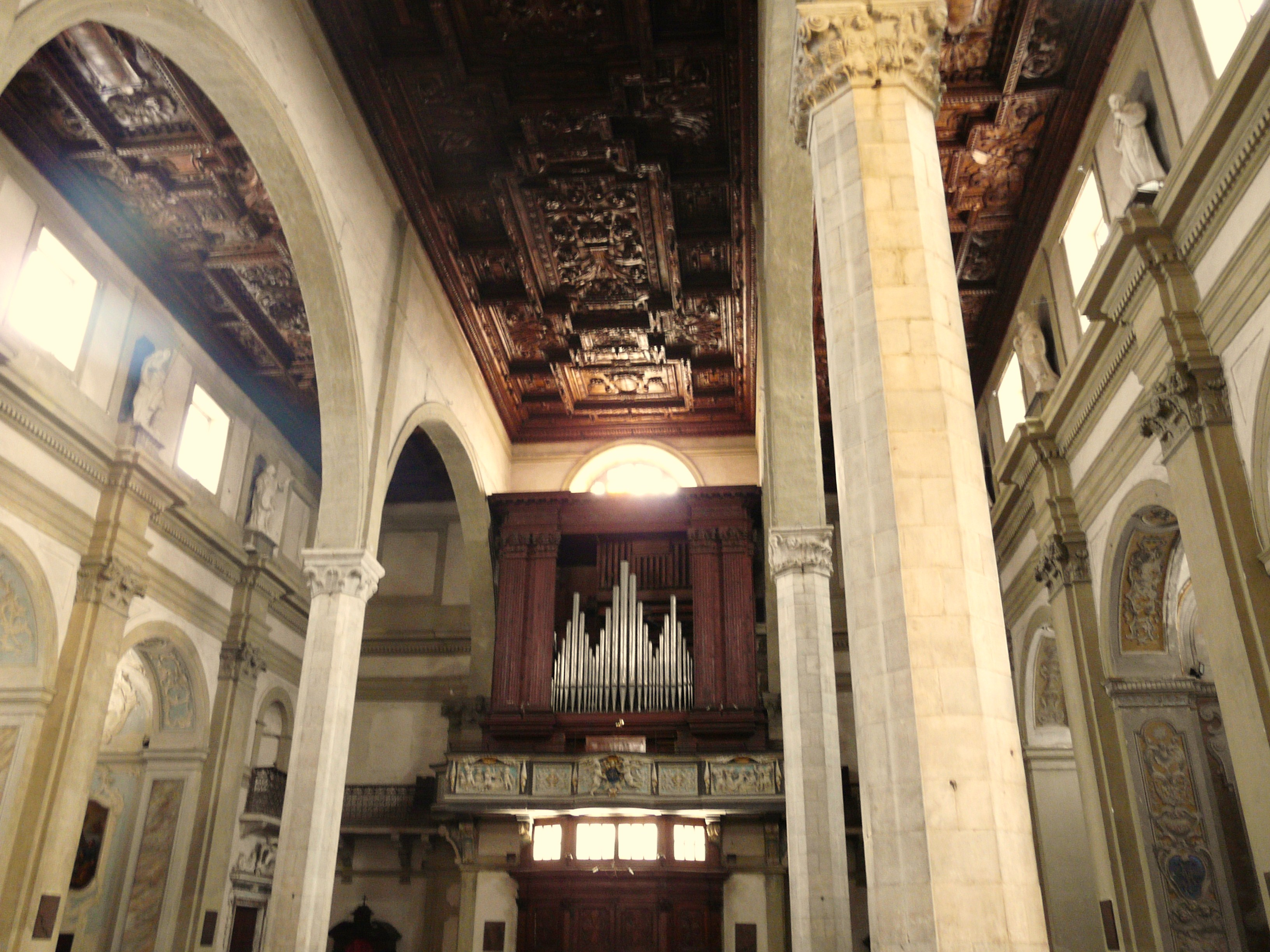
Nave looking west, showing the organ

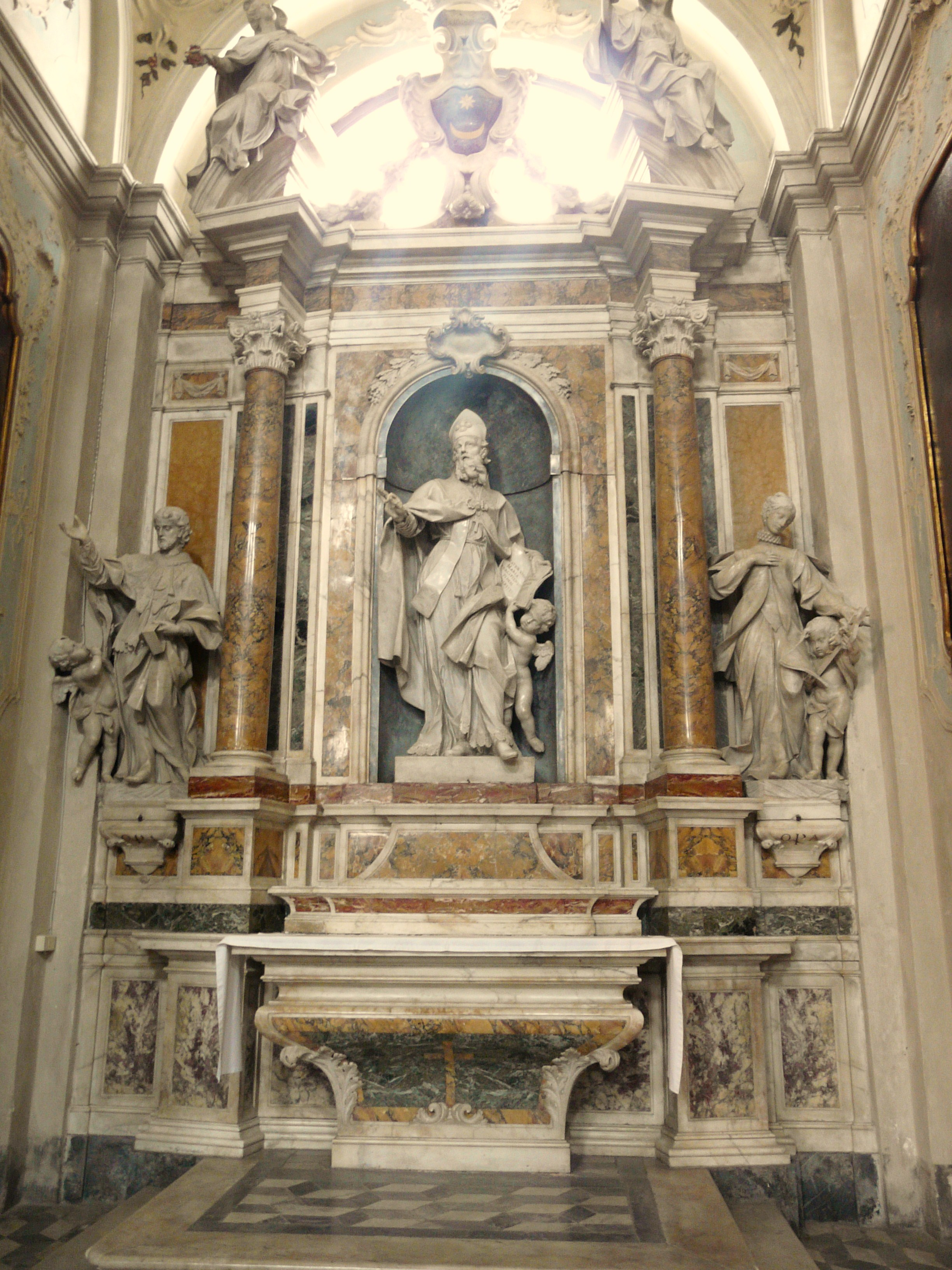
Altar, by Cybei, in the Chapel of Saint Augustine, showing Saint Augustine between Saint John Nepomuk and Saint Catherine of Genoa

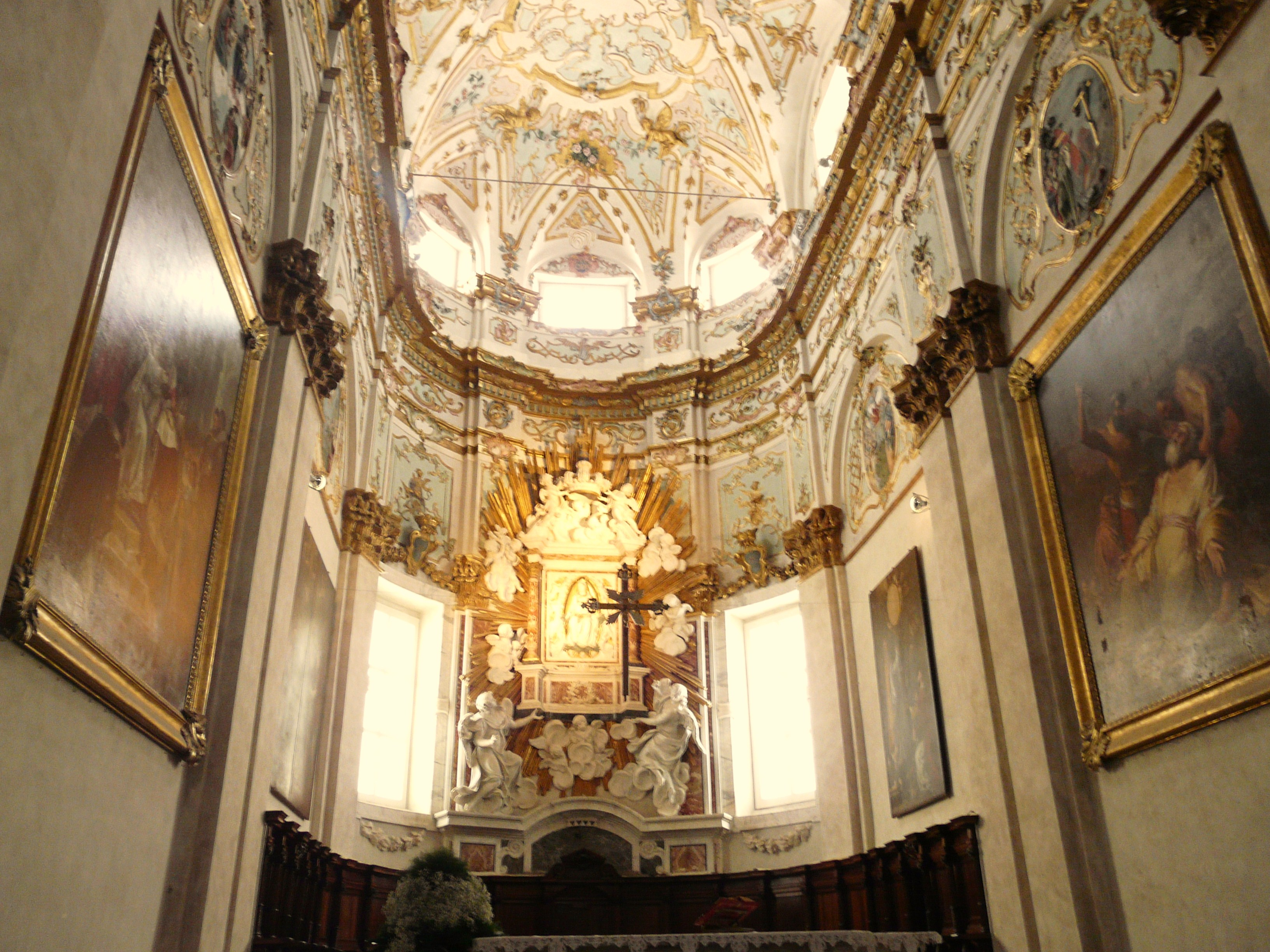
High altar

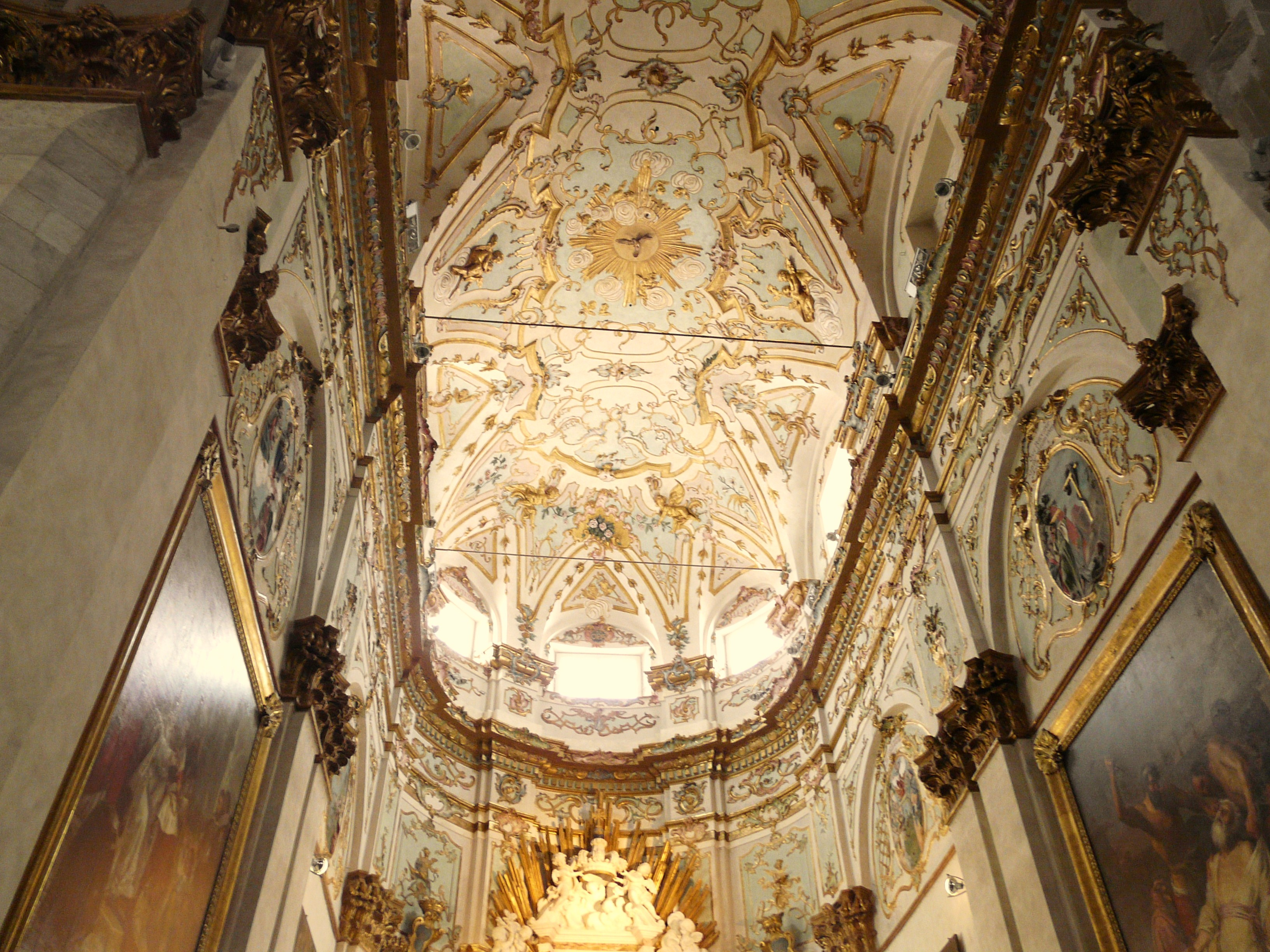
Ceiling and cupola over the choir and high altar

== Sources ==
- Sarzana Cathedral official website (in Italian)
