= Pope Eutychian =

Head of the Catholic Church from 275 to 283

Pope Saint Eutychian
- Bishop of Rome
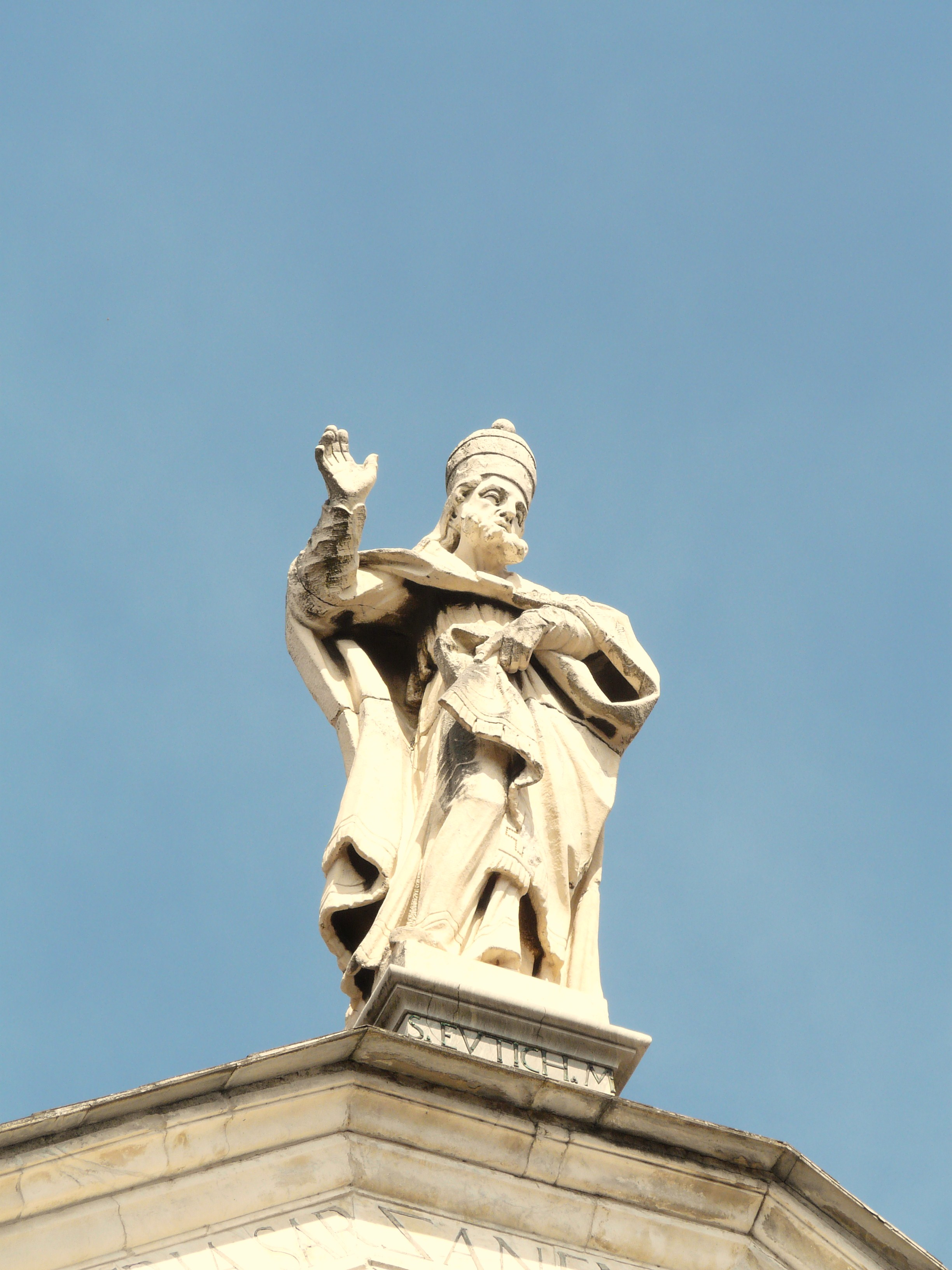
- Statue of Eutychian, Sarzana Cathedral, Liguria.
- Church: Great Church
- Papacy began: 4 January 275
- Papacy ended: 7 December 283
- Predecessor: Felix I
- Successor: Caius

Personal details
- Born: Luna ,Tuscany, Italy, Roman Empire
- Died: 7 December 283 Rome, Italy, Roman Empire
- Buried: Catacomb of Callixtus, Rome

Sainthood
- Feast day: 8 December

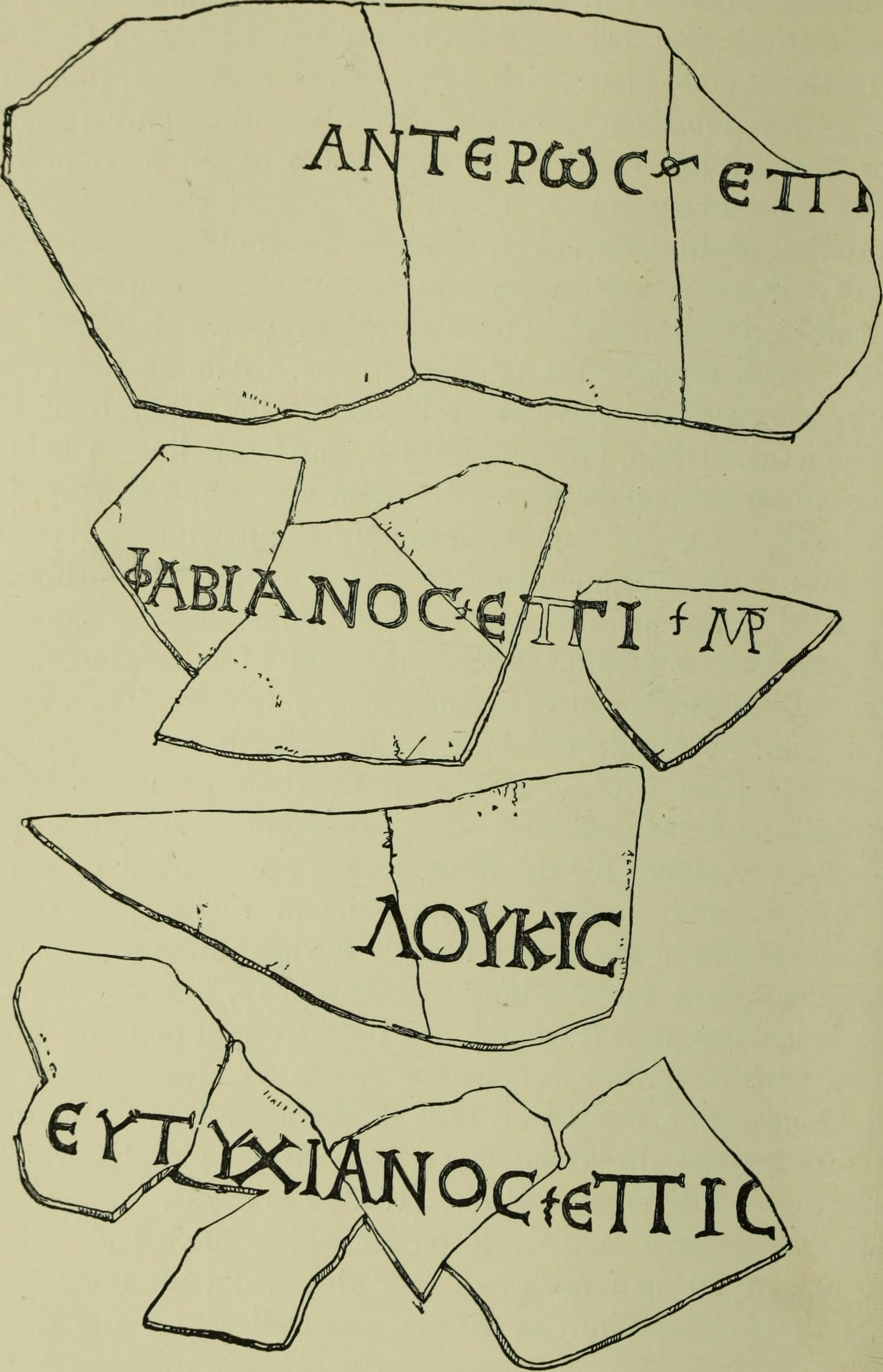
Epitaph of Eutychian; the bottom line reads "Eutychianos Epis[kopos]," 'Bishop Eutychian.'

Pope Eutychian, also called Eutychianus (Greek: Ευτυχιανός, romanized: Eutychianos), was the bishop of Rome from 4 January 275 to his death on 7 December 283.

Eutychian's original epitaph was discovered in the catacomb of Callixtus (see Kraus, Roma sotterranea, p. 154 et seq.), but almost nothing more is known of him. Even the date of his reign is uncertain. Liber Pontificalis gives a reign of 8 years and 11 months, from 275 to 283. Eusebius, on the other hand says his reign was only 10 months.

Eutychian is said to have allowed the blessing of grapes and beans on the altar and to have buried 324 martyrs with his own hands. Some historians doubt these traditions, but others assert that persecutions continued until the Edict of Serdica was proclaimed in 311 by Emperor Galerius, making Christianity a legal and acceptable religion. The blessing of produce of the fields is believed by some to belong to a later period, but this cannot be verified.

Eutychian's feast day is 8 December.

== See also ==
- List of Catholic saints
- List of popes

Titles of the Great Christian Church
Preceded by Felix I	Bishop of Rome; 275–283	Succeeded by Caius
