= Pope Lucius I =

Head of the Catholic Church from 253 to 254

Pope Saint Lucius I
- Bishop of Rome
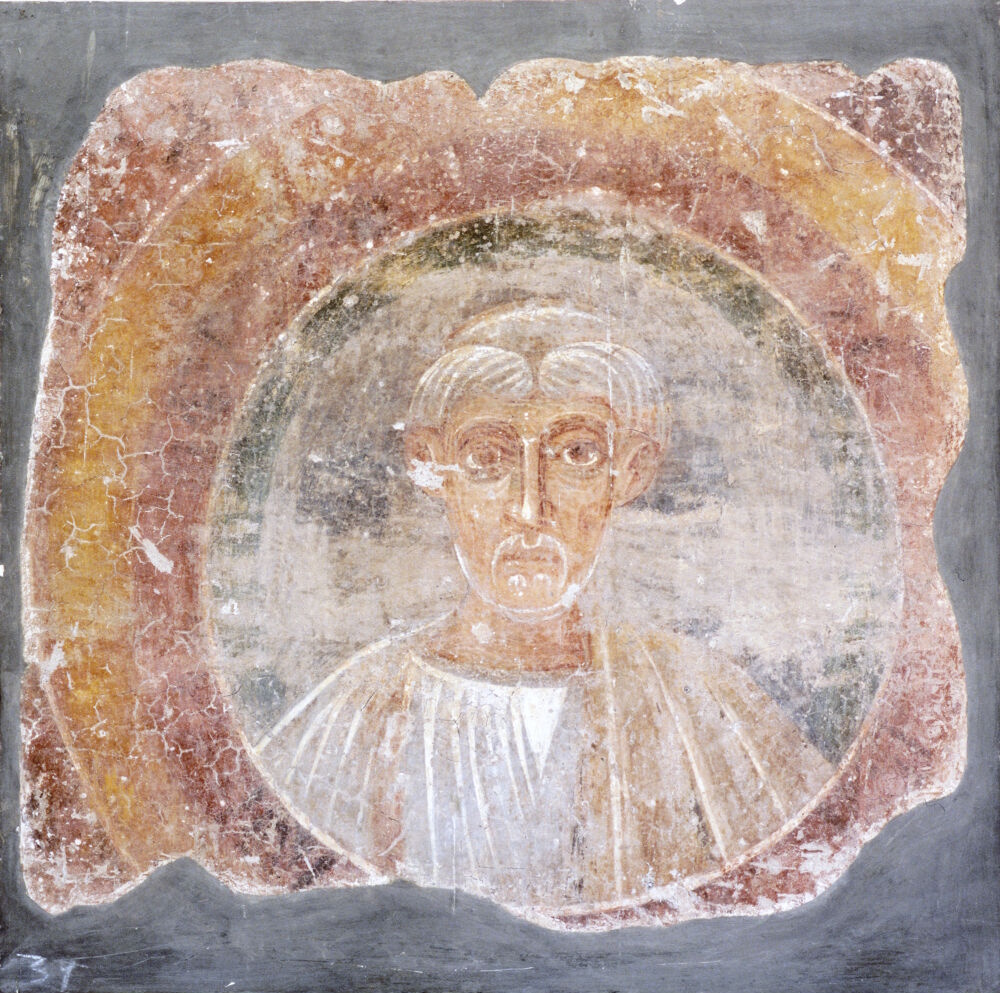
- Fresco originally located in the Basilica of Saint Paul Outside the Walls, c. 450
- Church: Catholic Church
- Papacy began: 25 June 253
- Papacy ended: 5 March 254
- Predecessor: Cornelius
- Successor: Stephen I

Personal details
- Born: Rome, Italy, Roman Empire
- Died: 5 March 254 Rome, Italy, Roman Empire
- Parents: Porphyrianus

Sainthood
- Feast day: 5 March
- Venerated in: Catholicism; Eastern Orthodoxy

Pope Lucius I (died 5 March 254) was the bishop of Rome from 25 June 253 to his death on 5 March 254. He was banished soon after his consecration, but gained permission to return. He was mistakenly classified as a martyr in the persecution by Emperor Valerian, which did not begin until after Lucius' death.

== Life ==
Lucius was born in Rome. Nothing is known about his family except his father's name, Porphyrianus. He was elected probably on 25 June 253. His election took place during the persecution which caused the banishment of his predecessor, Cornelius, and he also was banished soon after his consecration, but succeeded in gaining permission to return.

Lucius is praised in several letters of Cyprian (see Epist. lxviii. 5) for condemning the Novationists for their refusal to readmit to communion Christians who repented for having lapsed under persecution.

== Veneration ==
Lucius I's feast day is 5 March, on which date he is commemorated in the Roman Martyrology in the following terms: "In the cemetery of Callistus on the Via Appia, Rome, burial of Saint Lucius, Pope, successor of Saint Cornelius. For his faith in Christ he suffered exile and acted as an outstanding confessor of the faith, with moderation and prudence, in the difficult times that were his."

His feast did not appear in the Tridentine calendar of Pope Pius V. In 1602, it was inserted under the date of 4 March, into the General Roman Calendar. With the insertion in 1621 on the same date of the feast of Saint Casimir, the celebration of Pope Lucius was reduced to a commemoration within Saint Casimir's Mass. In the 1969 revision Pope Lucius's feast was omitted from the General Roman Calendar, partly because of the baselessness of the title of "martyr" with which he had previously been honoured, and was moved in the Roman Martyrology to the day of his death.

In spite of what is mistakenly stated in the Liber Pontificalis, he did not in fact suffer martyrdom. The persecution of Valerian in which he was said to have been martyred is known to have started later than March 254, when Pope Lucius died.

== Tomb ==
Lucius I's tombstone is still extant in the catacomb of Callixtus. His relics were later brought to the church of Santa Cecilia in Trastevere, along with the relics of Cecilia and others. His head is preserved in a reliquary in St. Ansgar's Cathedral in Copenhagen, Denmark. This relic was brought to Roskilde around the year 1100, after Lucius had been declared patron saint of the Danish region Zealand. According to tradition, there had been demons at large at the Isefjord at Roskilde city, and as they declared that they feared nothing but Lucius' skull, this had to be brought to Denmark, whereupon peace took reign of the fjord again. After the Reformation, the skull was taken to the exhibition rooms of king Frederik III in Copenhagen, where it was on exhibit along with the petrified embryo a woman had carried inside her for 28 years, as well as other monstrosities the king had collected. The skull remained in Roskilde Cathedral until 1908, when it was moved to Saint Ansgar's Cathedral while the property of Copenhagen's National museum.

Pope Lucius' head is among the few relics to have survived the Reformation in Denmark. However the Norwegian researcher Øystein Morten started wondering if Lucius' skull might have been mixed up with the skull of the Norwegian king Sigurd the Crusader (1090–1130). This skull had also been kept in the Danish National Museum collection in the 1800s until it was donated to Oslo University in 1867. Danish experts from the National Museum then studied the skull, using carbon dating which concluded that the skull belonged to a man who lived between AD 340 and 431, nearly 100 years after the death of Lucius in 254. So the skull in question never belonged to Lucius, who died around AD 254. The results also rule out that it may have belonged to the King Sigurd.

== See also ==
- List of Catholic saints
- List of popes

== Notes ==
Titles of the Great Christian Church
Preceded by Cornelius	Bishop of Rome; 253–254	Succeeded by Stephen I
