= Pope Anicetus =

Head of the Catholic Church from c. 157 to 168

Pope Saint Anicetus
- Bishop of Rome
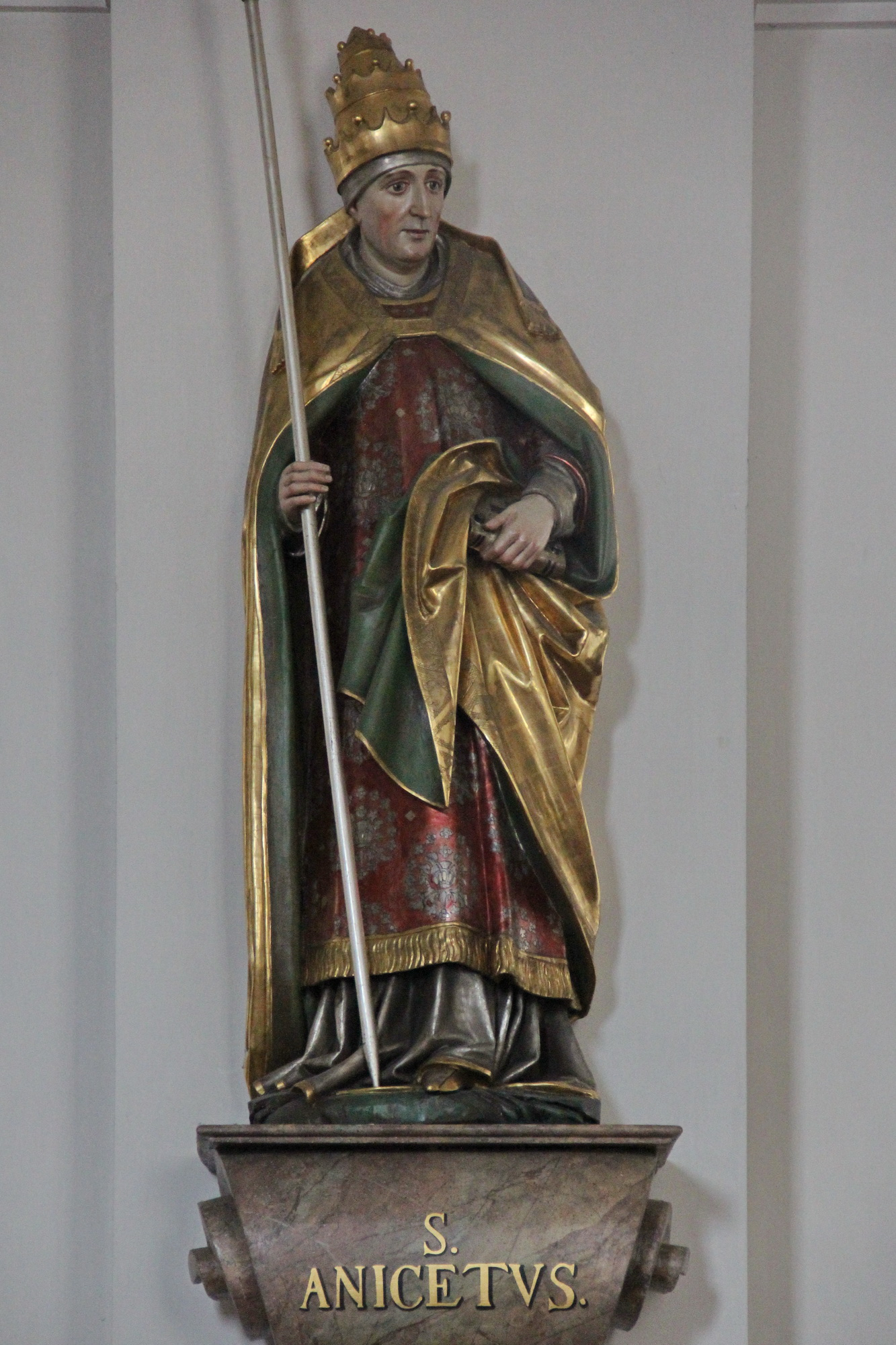
- Statue of Pope St. Anicetus from St. Laurentius, Holzkirchen in Wolnzach, Bavaria, Germany
- Church: Early Church
- Papacy began: c. 157
- Papacy ended: c. 20 April 168
- Predecessor: Pius I
- Successor: Soter

Personal details
- Born: late 1st century Emesa, Syria, Roman Empire
- Died: April 168 Rome, Italy, Roman Empire

Sainthood
- Feast day: 20 April (West); 17 April (East)
- Attributes: Papal tiara, palm branch

Pope Anicetus (Greek: Ανίκητος) was the bishop of Rome from c. 157 to his death in April 168. According to the Annuario Pontificio, the start of his papacy may have been 153. Anicetus actively opposed Gnosticism and Marcionism. He welcomed Polycarp of Smyrna to Rome to discuss the Easter controversy.

== Biography ==
According to the Liber Pontificalis, Anicetus was a Syrian from the city of Emesa (modern-day Homs).

According to Irenaeus, it was during the 11th pontificate--which was his--that the aged Polycarp of Smyrna, a disciple of John the Evangelist, visited Rome to discuss the celebration of Easter with Anicetus. Polycarp and his Church of Smyrna celebrated the crucifixion on the fourteenth day of Nisan, which coincides with Pesach (or Passover) regardless of which day of the week upon this date fell, while the Roman Church celebrated Easter on Sunday—the weekday of Jesus's resurrection. The two did not agree on a common date, but Anicetus conceded to Polycarp and the Church of Smyrna the ability to retain the date to which they were accustomed. The controversy was to grow heated in the following centuries.

The Christian historian Hegesippus also visited Rome during Anicetus's pontificate. This visit is often cited as a sign of the early importance of the Roman See.

Anicetus actively opposed the Gnostics and Marcionism. The Liber Pontificalis records that Anicetus decreed that priests are not allowed to have long hair (perhaps because the Gnostics wore long hair).

According to church tradition, Anicetus suffered martyrdom during the reign of Emperor Lucius Verus, but there are no historical grounds for this account. 16, 17 and 20 April are all cited as the date of his death, but 20 April is currently celebrated as his feast day. Before 1970, the date chosen was 17 April. The Liber Pontificalis states he was buried in the cemetery of Callistus.

== See also ==
- List of popes
- Quartodeciman

Titles of the Great Christian Church
Preceded by Pius I	Bishop of Rome; 154–167	Succeeded by Soter
