= Pope Caius =

Head of the Catholic Church from 283 to 296

Pope Saint Caius
- Bishop of Rome
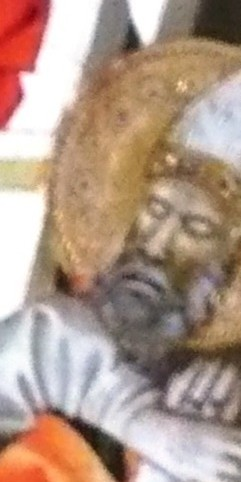
- Portrait at the Church of San Gaggio, Florence
- Church: Catholic Church
- Papacy began: 17 December 283
- Papacy ended: 22 April 296
- Predecessor: Eutychian
- Successor: Marcellinus

Personal details
- Born: Salona, Dalmatia, Roman Empire
- Died: 22 April 296 Rome, Italy, Roman Empire

Sainthood
- Feast day: 22 April

Pope Caius (died 22 April 296), also called Gaius, was the bishop of Rome from 17 December 283 to his death in 296. Little information on Caius is available except that given by the Liber Pontificalis, which relies on a legendary account of the martyrdom of Susanna of Rome for its information. According to legend, Caius baptized the men and women who had been converted by Tiburtius (who is venerated with Susanna) and Castulus. His legend states that Caius took refuge in the catacombs of Rome and died a martyr.

== Pontificate ==
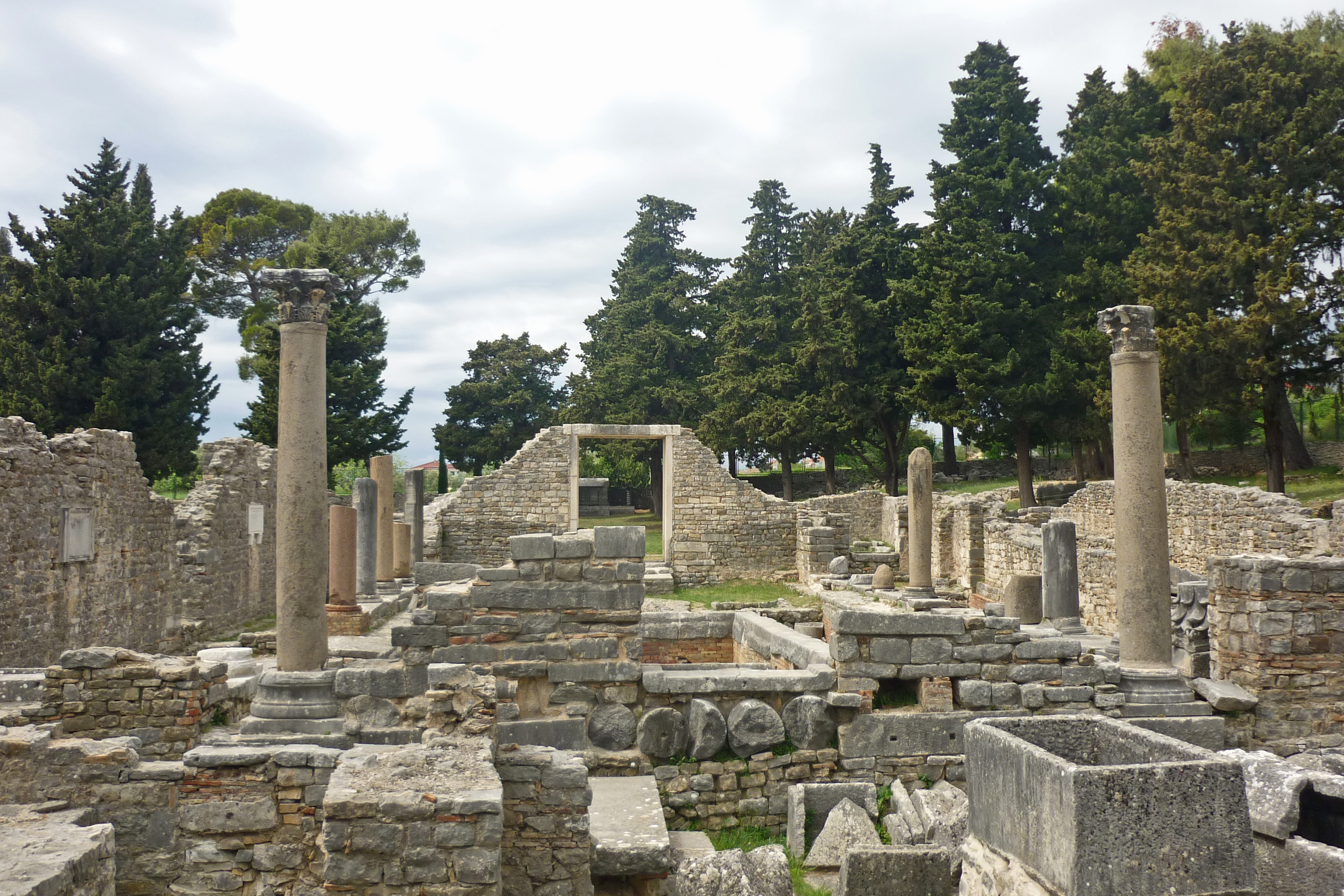
Remains of the basilica of Salona.

Christian tradition makes Caius a native of the Dalmatian city of Salona, the son of a man also named Caius or Gaius, and a member of a noble family related to the Emperor Diocletian. About 280, an early Christian house of worship was established on the site of Santa Susanna, which, like many of the earliest Christian meeting places, was in a house (domus ecclesiae). The domus belonged, according to the sixth-century acta, to brothers named Caius and Gabinus, prominent Christians. Caius may be this pope, or Caius the Presbyter. Gabinus is the name given to the father of Susanna. Thus, sources state that Caius was the uncle of Susanna.

As pope, Caius decreed that before someone could assume the position of bishop, he must first be porter, lector, exorcist, acolyte, subdeacon, deacon, and priest. He also divided the districts of Rome among the deacons. During his pontificate, anti-Christian measures increased, although new churches were built and cemeteries were expanded.

=== Martyrdom ===
Pope Caius would go into hiding due to increased persecution of the church, alongside Saints Polycarp, Sebastian, Tranquillinus, Tiburtius, Nicostratus and Zoe, in the house of Castulus, a Christian officer employed at the Imperial Palace. Over the course of the next few years, the entire group would be discovered one by one by Roman authorities and martyred. Caius would be found praying with Tiburtius shortly after the conversion and baptism of Tiburtius' children and the pair was brought to the local Praefectus, a man named Fabian, who ordered the construction of a great bonfire, and ordered the two to either throw frankincense into it to appease the Roman gods, or to cast themselves into it. Although Pope Caius' ultimate fate is unclear, often being associated with beheading, according to legend Tiburtius walked into the fire invoking the name of Christ and remained unhurt, so he was taken out of Rome by the Via Labicana and beheaded. However, Caius' martyrdom is disputed, as the Diocletianic Persecution of Christians began in 303 AD, after Caius’ alleged death, and Diocletian was not immediately hostile to Christianity upon becoming emperor.

== Legacy ==
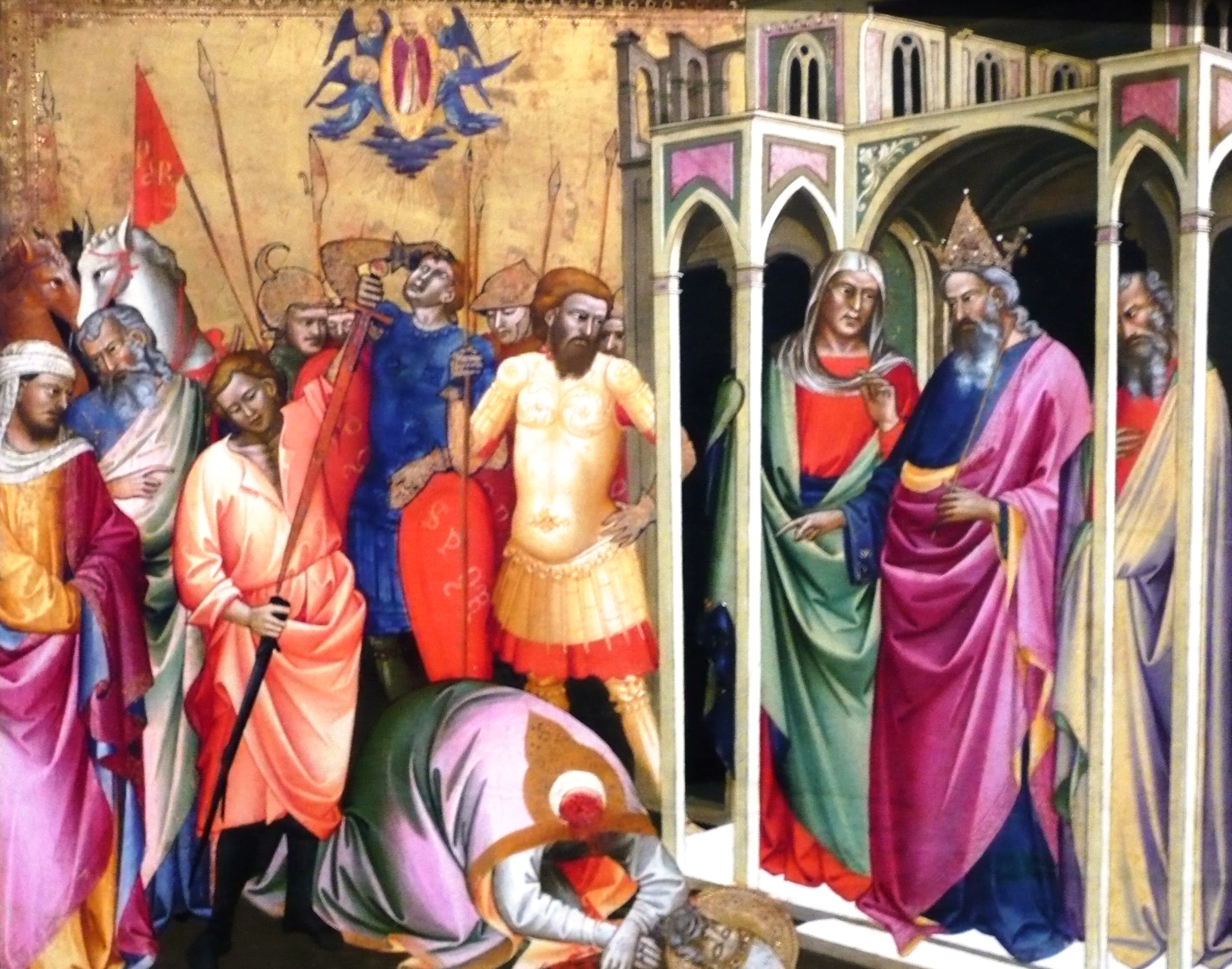
Depiction of the martyrdom of Pope Caius by Lorenzo Monaco. It was originally part of the altarpiece of the church of San Gaggio in Florence.

Caius is mentioned in the fourth-century Depositio Episcoporum (therefore not as a martyr): X kl maii Caii in Callisti.

Caius' tomb, with the original epitaph, was discovered in the catacomb of Callixtus and in it the ring with which he used to seal his letters (see Arringhi, Roma subterr., 1. iv. c. xlviii. p. 426). In 1631, his residence in Rome was turned into a church. However, it was demolished in 1880 to make room for the Ministry of War, on the Via XX Settembre, and his relics were transferred to the chapel of the Barberini family.

Saint Caius's feast day is celebrated on 22 April, as is that of Pope Soter. They are celebrated jointly in the Tridentine calendar and in the successive versions of the General Roman Calendar until that of 1969, since when they are omitted. Both are mentioned under 22 April in the Roman Martyrology, the official list of recognized saints. The entry for Saint Caius is as follows: "At Rome, in the cemetery of Callistus on the Via Appia, the burial of Saint Caius, Pope, who, fleeing from the persecution of Diocletian, died as a confessor of the faith."

Saint Caius is portrayed in art wearing the papal tiara with Saint Nereus. He is venerated in Dalmatia and Venice. In Florence, the church of San Gaggio on the via Senese was dedicated to him; the term Gaggio is a corruption of the name Cajo. In 2003, plans were put into effect to turn it into residential council housing.

== See also ==
- List of Catholic saints
- List of popes
- Pope Saint Caius, patron saint archive

Titles of the Great Christian Church
| Preceded by Eutychian | Bishop of Rome; Pope; 283–296 | Succeeded by Marcellinus |
