= Pope Sixtus II =

Head of the Catholic Church from 257 to 258

Pope Saint Sixtus II
- Pope of Rome
- Church: Catholic Church
- Papacy began: 31 August 257
- Papacy ended: 6 August 258
- Predecessor: Stephen I
- Successor: Dionysius

Personal details
- Born: Greece, Roman Empire
- Died: 6 August 258 Rome, Italy, Roman Empire

Sainthood
- Feast day: 6/7 August, 10 August (Eastern Orthodox Church)
- Venerated in: Catholic Church, Eastern Orthodox Church, Oriental Orthodoxy

Pope Sixtus II (Greek: Πάπας Σίξτος Β΄; died 6 August 258), also written as Pope Xystus II, was Pope from 31 August 257 until his death on 6 August 258. He was killed along with seven deacons, including Lawrence of Rome, during the persecution of Christians by the Emperor Valerian.

== Life ==
According to the Liber Pontificalis, he was a Greek, born in Greece, and was formerly a philosopher. However, this is uncertain, and is disputed by modern Western historians arguing that the authors of Liber Pontificalis confused him with the contemporary author Xystus, who was a Greek student of Pythagoreanism.

Sixtus II restored the relations with the African and Eastern churches, which had been broken off by his predecessor over the question of heretical baptism raised by the heresy Novatianism.

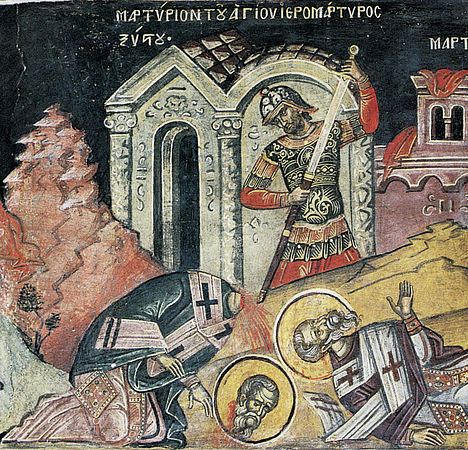
The Martyrdom of Sixtus II at 'Dionysiou Monastery' (1547)

In the persecutions under the Emperor Valerian in 258, numerous bishops, priests, and deacons were put to death. Pope Sixtus II was one of the first victims of this persecution, being beheaded on 6 August. He was martyred along with six deacons: Januarius, Vincentius, Magnus, Stephanus, Felicissimus and Agapitus. Lawrence of Rome, his best-known deacon, suffered martyrdom on 10 August, four days after his bishop.

Sixtus is thought by some to be the author of the pseudo-Cyprianic writing Ad Novatianum, though this view has not found general acceptance. Another composition written at Rome, between 253 and 258, is generally agreed to be his.

== Legacy ==
Sixtus II is referred to by name in the Roman Canon of the Mass. The Tridentine calendar commemorated Sixtus, Felicissimus, and Agapitus on the feast of the Transfiguration of the Lord, 6 August. They remained in that position in the General Roman Calendar until 1969, when, with the abolition of commemorations, the memorial of Sixtus "and his companions" was moved to 7 August, the day immediately after that of their death.

The following inscription honoring Sixtus was placed on his tomb in the catacomb of Callixtus by Pope Damasus I:

At the time when the sword pierced the bowels of the Mother, I, buried here, taught as Pastor the Word of God; when suddenly the soldiers rushed in and dragged me from the chair. The faithful offered their necks to the sword, but as soon as the Pastor saw the ones who wished to rob him of the palm (of martyrdom) he was the first to offer himself and his own head, not tolerating that the (pagan) frenzy should harm the others. Christ, who gives recompense, made manifest the Pastor's merit, preserving unharmed the flock.

== See also ==
- List of Catholic saints
- List of popes
- Sistine Madonna

== Literature ==
- Erich Kettenhofen (1995). "Sixtus II". In Bautz, Traugott (ed.). Biographisch-Bibliographisches Kirchenlexikon (BBKL) (in German). Vol. 10. Herzberg: Bautz. cols. 578–582. ISBN 3-88309-062-X.

Titles of the Great Christian Church
Preceded by Stephen I	Bishop of Rome; 257–258	Succeeded by Dionysius
