= Pope Felix I =

Head of the Catholic Church from 269 to 274

Pope Saint Felix I
- Bishop of Rome
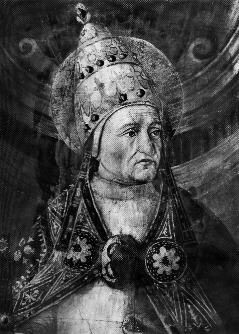
- Felix I as depicted on a fresco in the Sistine Chapel
- Church: Early Church
- Papacy began: 5 January 269
- Papacy ended: 30 December 274
- Predecessor: Dionysius
- Successor: Eutychian

Personal details
- Born: Rome, Italy, Roman Empire
- Died: 30 December 274 Rome, Italy, Roman Empire

Sainthood
- Feast day: 30 December; 30 May (1960 Calendar); 6 Hathor (Coptic Christianity)
- Venerated in: Catholic Church, Eastern Orthodox Church, Oriental Orthodoxy

Pope Felix I (died 30 December 274) was the bishop of Rome from 5 January 269 to his death on 30 December 274. Born in Rome, he succeeded Pope Dionysius and is noted for his theological contributions, particularly a significant dogmatic letter addressing the unity of Christ’s person. During his papacy, Felix I confronted the heresy of Paul of Samosata, who denied the divinity of Christ. The intervention of Emperor Aurelian, prompted by Felix, led to Paul’s deposition from the bishopric of Antioch, reinforcing orthodox Christological doctrine.

Felix is traditionally credited with instituting the practice of celebrating Mass over the tombs of martyrs, though this attribution remains a subject of historical debate. Upon his death, Felix was interred in the Catacomb of Callixtus on the Appian Way. While later accounts mistakenly honored him as a martyr, contemporary scholarship suggests he died of natural causes.

== Life and works ==
A Roman by birth, Felix was chosen to be pope on 5 January 269, in succession to Dionysius, who had died on 26 December 268.

Felix was the author of an important dogmatic letter on the unity of Christ's Person. He received Emperor Aurelian's aid in settling a theological dispute between the anti-Trinitarian Paul of Samosata, who had been deprived of the bishopric of Antioch by a council of bishops for heresy, and the orthodox new bishop Domnus. Paul refused to give way, and in 272 Aurelian was asked to decide between the rivals. He ordered the church building to be given to the bishop who was "recognized by the bishops of Italy and of the city of Rome" (Felix). See Eusebius, Hist. Ecc. vii. 30.

The text of that letter was later interpolated by a follower of Apollinaris in the interests of his sect.

The notice about Felix in the Liber Pontificalis ascribes to him a decree that Masses should be celebrated on the tombs of martyrs ("Hic constituit supra memorias martyrum missas celebrare"). The author of this entry was evidently alluding to the custom of celebrating Mass privately at the altars near or over the tombs of the martyrs in the crypts of the catacombs (missa ad corpus), while the solemn celebration always took place in the basilicas built over the catacombs. This practice, still in force at the end of the fourth century, dates apparently from the period when the great cemeterial basilicas were built in Rome, and owes its origin to the solemn commemoration services of martyrs, held at their tombs on the anniversary of their burial, as early as the third century. Felix probably issued no such decree, but the compiler of the Liber Pontificalis attributed it to him because he made no departure from the custom in force in his time.

== Death and veneration ==
The acts of the Council of Ephesus give Pope Felix as a martyr; but this detail, which occurs again in the biography of the pope in the Liber Pontificalis, is unsupported by any authentic earlier evidence and is manifestly due to a confusion of names. It is obviously a confusion with a Roman martyr of the same name buried on the Via Aurelia, and over whose grave a church was built. The Liber Pontificalis states that Felix erected a basilica on the Via Aurelia, and also that he was buried there. The latter detail is evidently an error, for the fourth-century Roman calendar of feasts says that Pope Felix was interred in the Catacomb of Callixtus on the Via Appia. In the Roman "Feriale" or calendar of feasts, the name of Felix occurs in the list of Roman bishops (Depositio episcoporum), and not in that of the martyrs.

As above, Felix was interred in the catacomb of Callixtus on 30 December, "III Kal. Jan." (third day to the calends of January) in the Roman dating system. Saint Felix I is mentioned as Pope and Martyr, with a simple feast, on 30 May. This date, given in the Liber Pontificalis as that of his death (III Kal. Jun.), is probably an error which could easily occur through a transcriber writing "Jun." for "Jan." This error persisted in the General Roman Calendar until 1969 (see General Roman Calendar of 1960), by which time the mention of Saint Felix I was reduced to a commemoration in the weekday Mass by decision of Pope Pius XII (see General Roman Calendar of Pope Pius XII). Thereafter, the feast of Saint Felix I, no longer mentioned in the General Roman Calendar, is celebrated on his true day of death, 30 December, and without the qualification of "martyr".

According to more recent studies, the oldest liturgical books indicate that the saint honoured on 30 May was a little-known martyr buried on the Via Aurelia, who was mistakenly identified with Pope Felix I, an error similar to the identification in the liturgical books of the martyr saint celebrated on 30 July with the antipope Felix II, corrected in the mid-1950s.

== See also ==
- List of Catholic saints
- List of popes

Titles of the Great Christian Church
Preceded by Dionysius	Bishop of Rome; 269–274	Succeeded by Eutychian
