= Pope Dionysius =

Head of the Catholic Church from 259 to 268

Pope Saint Dionysius
- Bishop of Rome
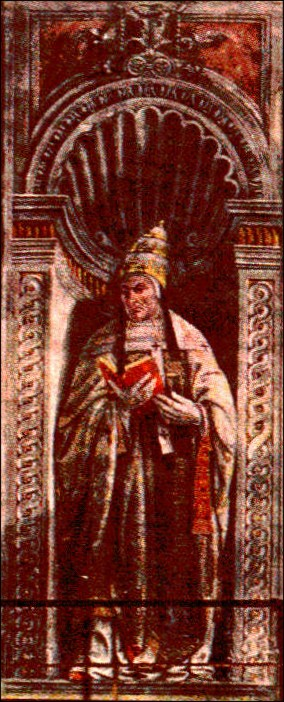
- Portrait of Dionysius, by the 15th c. artist Sandro Botticelli, in the Sistine Chapel. Dionysius is depicted in anachronistic papal vestments, along with a book, common attributes in art of this pope.
- Church: Catholic Church
- Papacy began: 22 July 259 AD
- Papacy ended: 26 December 268
- Predecessor: Sixtus II
- Successor: Felix I

Personal details
- Born: Terranova da Sibari, early 3rd century
- Died: 26 December 268 Rome, Roman Empire

Sainthood
- Feast day: 26 December
- Venerated in: Catholic Church
- Attributes: Papal vestments; Book; Crozier

Pope Dionysius (Greek: Διονύσιος) was the Bishop of Rome from 22 July 259 to 26 December 268. His pontificate oversaw the transition from Valerian's persecutions to the toleration issued by Gallienus in 260. During this period, he reorganized the Roman church, assigning presbyters to individual parishes.

Dionysius participated in early conciliar disputes with wide ecclesial effect. The Synods of Antioch (264–268), which condemned Paul of Samosata, addressed their synodal letter jointly to Dionysius and Maximus of Alexandria, marking the earliest known conciliar decree of its kind. In the same decade, he convened a Roman synod in response to Egyptian Christians of the Libyan Pentapolis who challenged Dionysius of Alexandria's erroneous anti-Sabellian formulations.

His only extant work is the post-synodal letter issued by Rome. In it, he defends the divine monarchia by rejecting both the Western problem of Sabellianism and the Alexandrian tendency toward hierarchical subordination, while explicitly affirming that the Son of God was not a created "work" (poiēma). Fragments preserved in Athanasius's De Decretis (c. 350–355) attest to Dionysius' formidable pre-Nicene affirmation of the Son's eternal generation. Scholars regard his synodal theology as highly advanced, firmly establishing early Trinitarianism and "as if nipping Arius' errors in the bud."

== Pontificate ==
Dionysius was born in Terranova da Sibari in the early 3rd century. He was elected pope in 259, after the martyrdom of Sixtus II in 258. The Holy See had been vacant for nearly a year because it was difficult to elect a new pope during the violent persecution which Christians faced. When the oppression had begun to subside, Dionysius was raised to the office of Bishop of Rome. Emperor Valerian I, who had led the tyranny, was captured and killed by the King of Persia in 260. The new emperor, Gallienus, issued an edict of toleration, restoring the churches, cemeteries and other properties it had held, ushering in the nearly 40-year "Little Peace of the Church". To the new pope fell the task of reshaping the Catholic Church, which had fallen into great disorder.

Teaching regarding the relation of God to the Logos had arisen from Bishop Dionysius in Alexandria. The pope in Rome called for explanations; a satisfactory response duly arrived back, notwithstanding expostulation about the propriety of all this from some of the Alexandrian Christians.

To rebuild, and to ransom those held captive, Pope Dionysius sent large sums of money to the churches of Cappadocia, devastated by marauding Goths. Following Emperor Gallienus' edict of toleration, he brought order to the church and helped secure a peace that lasted until 303, some 35 years after his death on 26 December 268.

According to St. Athanasius, Pope St. Dionysius retroactively condemned Arianism far before the First Ecumenical Council of Nicaea on behalf of the entire Church saying, "For Dionysius, Bishop of Rome, having written also against those who said that the Son of God was a creature and a created thing, it is manifest that not now for the first time but from of old the heresy of the Arian adversaries of Christ has been anathematised by all."

In art, Dionysius is portrayed in papal vestments, along with a book.

== See also ==
- List of popes
- List of Catholic saints

== Notes ==
Titles of the Great Christian Church
Preceded by Sixtus II	Bishop of Rome; 259–268	Succeeded by Felix I
