= Pope Soter =

Head of the Catholic Church from c. 167 to c. 174

Pope Saint Soter
- Bishop of Rome
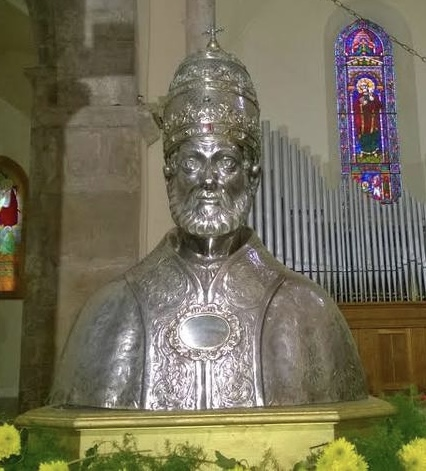
- Modern bust of Pope Soter, from Fondi, with anachronistic papal tiara
- Church: Catholic Church
- Papacy began: c. 167
- Papacy ended: 174
- Predecessor: Anicetus
- Successor: Eleutherius

Personal details
- Born: Fundi, Italy, Roman Empire
- Died: c. 174 Rome, Italy, Roman Empire

Sainthood
- Feast day: 22 April
- Venerated in: Catholic Church, Oriental Orthodoxy

Pope Soter (Greek: Σωτήρ, Latin: Soterius) was the bishop of Rome from c. 167 to his death in c. 174. According to the Annuario Pontificio, the dates may have ranged from 162–168 to 170–177. He was born in Fundi, in the Lazio region of Italy. Soter is known for declaring that marriage was valid only as a sacrament blessed by a priest and also for formally inaugurating Easter as an annual festival in Rome. His name, from Greek Σωτήριος from σωτήρ "saviour", would be his baptismal name, as his lifetime predates the tradition of adopting papal names.

== Early life ==
Pope Soter was born in Fondi, Lazio (then in Campania), into a Greek family. This ancestry seems to have made Soter particularly interested in the problems of relations with the Greek Church, even sending a collection of funds to the Church of Corinth, in order for them to be distributed to the poor.

== Roman Martyrology ==
Saint Soter's feast day is celebrated on 22 April, as is that of Saint Caius. The Roman Martyrology, the official list of recognized saints, references Soter: "At Rome, Saint Soter, Pope, whom Dionysius of Corinth praises for his outstanding charity towards needy exiled Christians who came to him, and towards those who had been condemned to the mines."

It has often been supposed that all the earliest Popes suffered martyrdom, but the Roman Martyrology does not give Pope Soter the title of martyr. The book detailing the 1969 revision of the General Roman Calendar states: "There are no grounds for including Saint Soter and Saint Caius among the martyrs."

== Reaction to the Montanist movement ==
The Montanist movement, which originated in Asia Minor, made its way to Rome and Gaul in the second half of the 2nd century, during the reign of Eleuterus. Its nature did not diverge so much from the orthodoxy of the time for it to initially be labeled heresy. During the violent persecution at Lyon, in 177, local confessors wrote from their prison concerning the new movement to the Asiatic and Phrygian communities as well as to Pope Eleuterus. The bearer of their letter to the pope was the presbyter Irenaeus, soon to become Bishop of Lyon. It appears from statements of Eusebius concerning these letters that the Christians of Lyon, though opposed to the Montanist movement, advocated patience and pleaded for the preservation of ecclesiastical unity.

When the Roman church took its definite stand against Montanism is not precisely known. Tertullian records that a Roman bishop sent some conciliatory letters to the Montanists, but based on the complaints of Praxeas "concerning the prophets themselves and their churches, and by insistence on the decisions of the bishop's predecessors" forced the pontiff to recall these letters. The Praedestinatorum Haeresis (once attributed to Augustine of Hippo, but now considered to be the work of an unknown author) states that "Holy Soter, Pope of the City, wrote against them a book, as did the master, Apollonius of Ephesus. Against these wrote the priest Tertullian of Carthage, who "in all ways wrote well, wrote first and wrote incomparably, in this alone did reprehensibly, that he defended Montanus". At Rome, the Gnostics and Marcionites continued to preach against the Catholic Church.

== See also ==
- List of Catholic saints
- List of popes

Titles of the Great Christian Church
Preceded by Anicetus	Bishop of Rome; 167–175	Succeeded by Eleutherius
