= Saint Peter's tomb =

Memorial site in Vatican City

Coordinates: 41.9022°N 12.4533°E

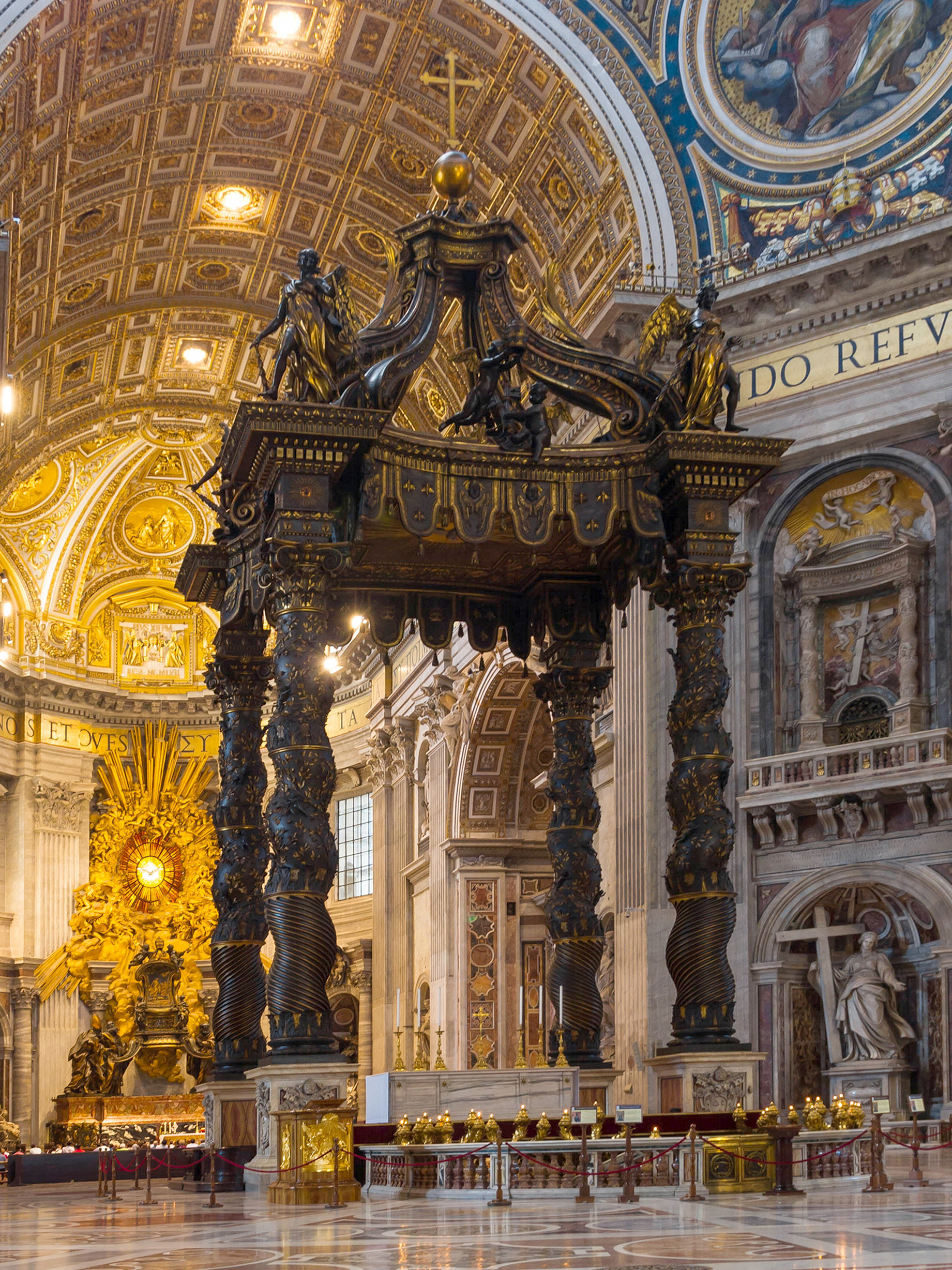
St. Peter's Baldachin, by Bernini, in the modern St. Peter's Basilica. Saint Peter's tomb lies directly below this structure.

Saint Peter's tomb is a site under St. Peter's Basilica that includes several graves and a structure said by Vatican authorities to have been built to memorialize the location of Saint Peter's grave. The site of St. Peter's tomb is alleged to be near the west end of the Vatican Necropolis, a complex of mausoleums that date between about AD 130 and AD 500.

The Necropolis complex was partially torn down and filled with earth to provide a foundation for the building of the first St. Peter's Basilica during the reign of Constantine I in about AD 330. As the result of two campaigns of archaeological excavation, many bones have been found at the site of the 2nd-century shrine, but Pope Pius XII stated in December 1950 that none could be confirmed to be Saint Peter's with absolute certainty.

On 26 June 1968, following the discovery of bones that had been transferred from a second tomb under the monument, Pope Paul VI stated that the relics of Saint Peter had been identified in a manner considered to be convincing. Circumstantial evidence was provided to support the claim.

The grave lies at the foot of the aedicula beneath the floor. The remains of four individuals and several farm animals were found in this grave. In 1953, after the initial archeological efforts had been completed, another set of bones was found that were said to have been removed without the archeologists' knowledge from a niche (loculus) in the north side of a graffiti wall that abuts the red wall on the right of the aedicula. Subsequent testing indicated that these were the bones of a 60-to-70-year-old man. Margherita Guarducci argued that these were the remains of Saint Peter and that they had been moved into a niche in the graffiti wall from the grave under the aedicula "at the time of Constantine, after the peace of the church" (313). Antonio Ferrua, the archaeologist who headed the excavation that uncovered what the Catholic Church says is Saint Peter's Tomb, said he was not convinced the bones found were those of Saint Peter. The clear modern consensus is that, while the specific bone fragments may not be able to be conclusively verified as Peter's, the site was certainly his original burial place, with ancient Christians venerating the tomb for centuries long before the construction of the original Constantinian Basilica.

== Death of Peter at Vatican Hill ==
The earliest reference to Saint Peter's death is in a letter of Clement, bishop of Rome, to the Corinthians (1 Clement, a.k.a. Letter to the Corinthians, written c. AD 96). The historian Eusebius, a contemporary of Constantine, wrote that Peter "came to Rome, and was crucified with his head downwards," attributing this information to the much earlier theologian Origen, who died c. AD 253. St. Peter's martyrdom is traditionally depicted in religious iconography as crucifixion with his head pointed downward.

Eusebius, in his book Church History, explains that the burial sites of Saints Peter and Paul were still known in his time. Eusebius supports this account with information from Caius, an early 3rd century Christian writer who lived during the time of Pope Zephyrinus. In a debate with Proclus, a leader of the Phrygian heresy, Caius claims he can show the burial places of Peter and Paul at the Vatican and the Ostian Way.

It is, therefore, recorded that Paul was beheaded in Rome itself, and that Peter likewise was crucified under Nero. This account of Peter and Paul is substantiated by the fact that their names are preserved in the cemeteries of that place even to the present day.

It is confirmed likewise by Caius, a member of the Church, who arose under Zephyrinus, bishop of Rome. He, in a published disputation with Proclus, the leader of the Phrygian heresy, speaks as follows concerning the places where the sacred corpses of the aforesaid apostles are laid: "But I can show the trophies of the apostles. For if you will go to the Vatican or to the Ostian way, you will find the trophies of those who laid the foundations of this church."

— Eusebius, Church History, Book II, Chapter 25

Peter's place and manner of death are also mentioned by Tertullian (c. 160-220) in Scorpiace, where the death is said to take place during the Christian persecutions by Nero. Tacitus (56–117) describes the persecution of Christians in his Annals, though he does not specifically mention Peter. "They were torn by dogs and perished, or were nailed to crosses, or were doomed to the flames and burnt." Furthermore, Tertullian says these events took place in the imperial gardens near the Circus of Nero. The Great Fire of Rome destroyed the Circus Maximus and most of the rest of the city in the year AD 64.

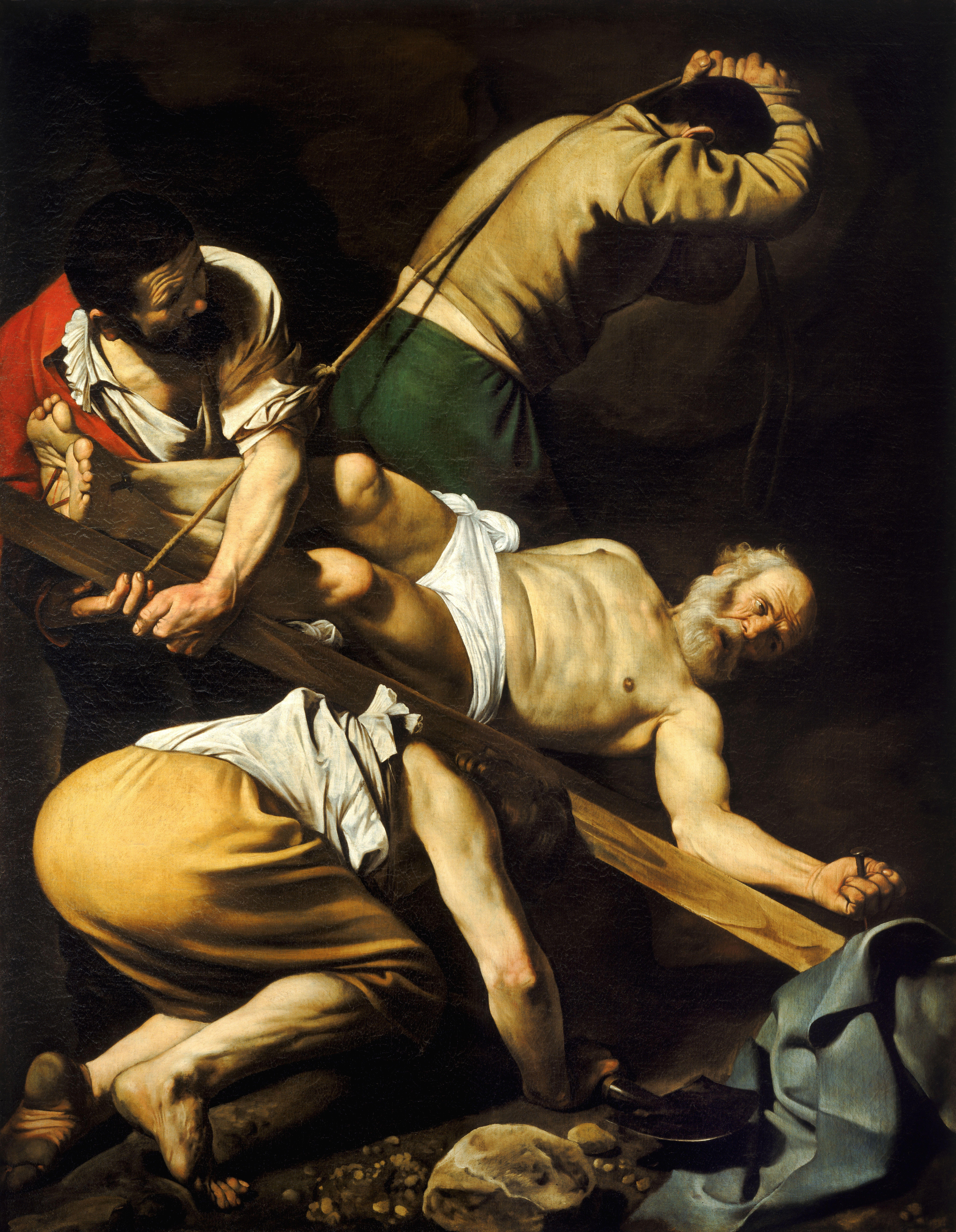
Crucifixion of St. Peter by Caravaggio, 1600–01

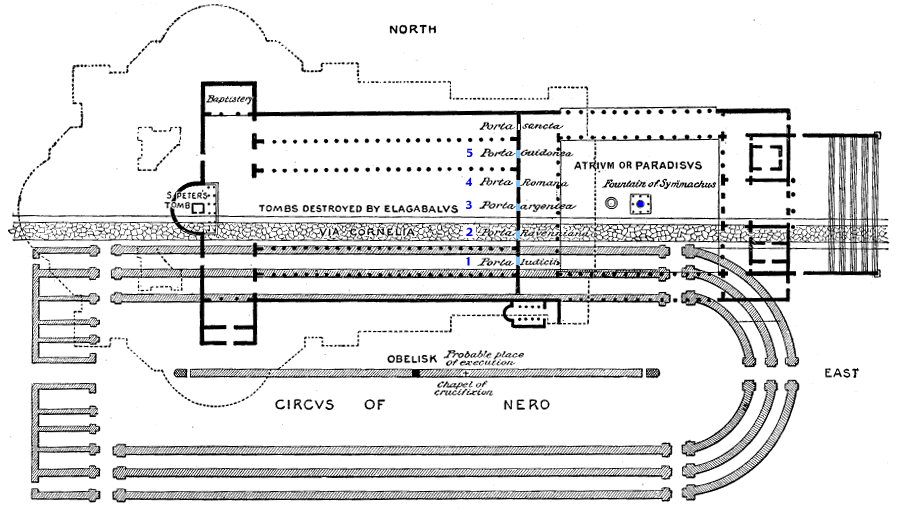
An early interpretation of the relative locations of the circus of Nero, and the medieval and current Basilicas of St. Peter.

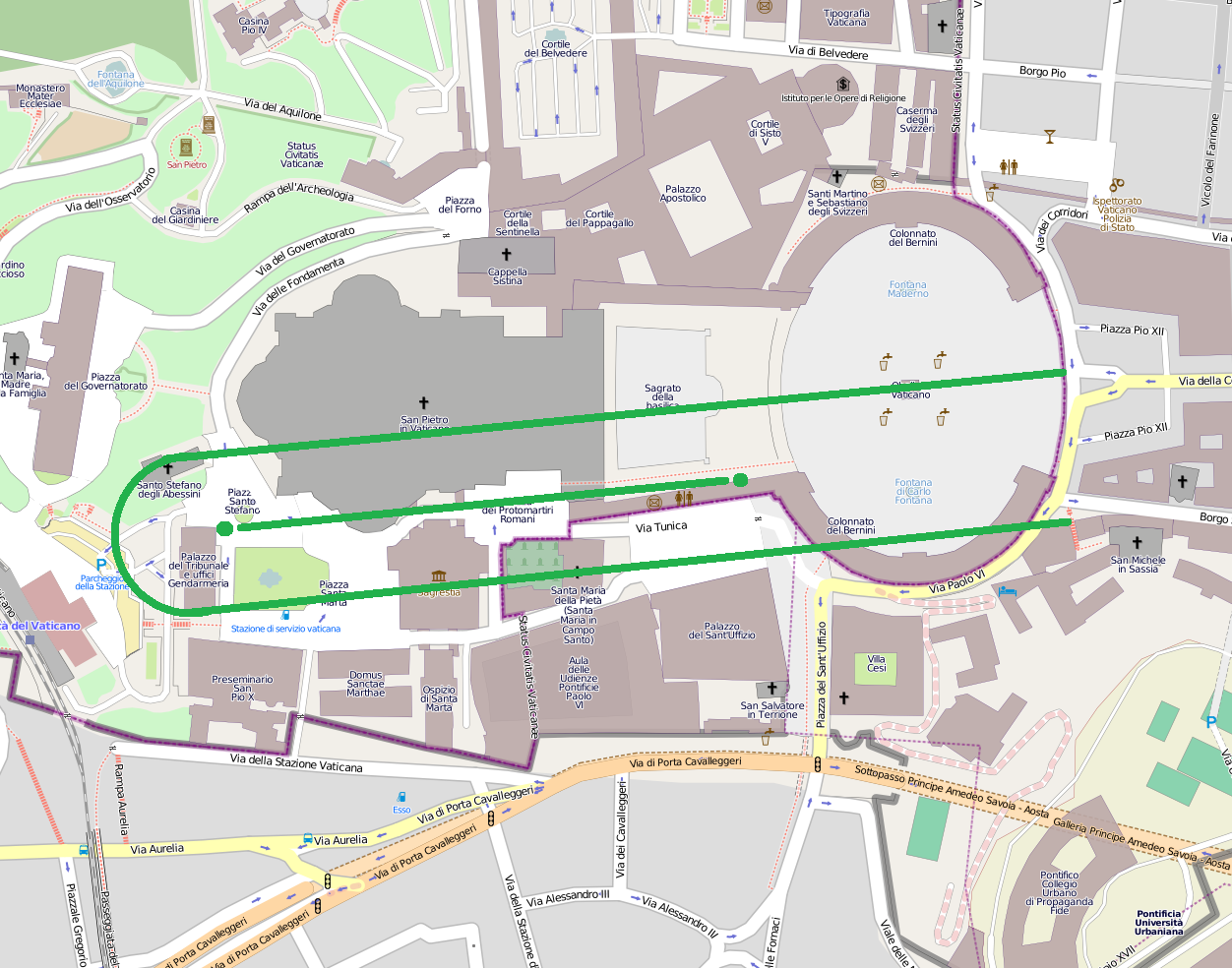
One possible modern interpretation

== Tracing the original tombs ==
Dionysius of Corinth mentions the burial place of Peter as Rome when he wrote to the Church of Rome in the time of the Pope Soter (died 174), thanking the Romans for their financial help. "You have thus by such an admonition bound together the planting of Peter and of Paul at Rome and Corinth. For both of them planted and likewise taught us in our Corinth. And they taught together in like manner in Italy, and suffered martyrdom at the same time."

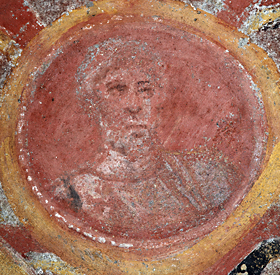
Fourth century glass mosaic of Saint Peter, located at the Catacombs of Saint Thecla.

Catholic tradition holds that the bereaved Christians followed their usual custom in burying him as near as possible to the scene of his suffering. According to Catholic lore, he was laid in ground that belonged to Christian proprietors, by the side of a well-known road leading out of the city, the Via Cornelia (site of a known pagan and Christian cemetery) on the hill called Vaticanus. The actual tomb was an underground vault, approached from the road by a descending staircase, and the body reposed in a sarcophagus of stone in the center of this vault.

The Book of Popes mentions that Pope Anacletus built a "sepulchral monument" over the underground tomb of Saint Peter shortly after his death. This was a small chamber or oratory over the tomb, where three or four persons could kneel and pray over the grave. The pagan Roman Emperor, Julian the Apostate, mentions in 363 A.D. in his work Three Books Against the Galileans that the tomb of Saint Peter was a place of worship, albeit secretly.

There is evidence of the existence of the tomb (trophoea, i.e., trophies, as signs or memorials of victory) at the beginning of the 3rd century, in the words of the priest Caius refuting the Montanist traditions of a certain Proclus: "But I can show the trophies of the Apostles. For if you will go to the Vatican, or to the Ostian way, you will find the trophies of those who laid the foundations of this church." These tombs were the objects of pilgrimage during the ages of persecution, and it will be found recorded in certain Acts of the Martyrs that they were seized while praying at the tombs of the Apostles.

During the reign of the Roman Emperor Valerian (September 253 – June 260), Christian persecution was particularly severe. The remains of the dead, and particularly the Christian dead, had lost their usual protections under Roman law. Some have conjectured that the remains of Peter and Paul may have been removed temporarily from their original tombs in order to preserve them from desecration by the Romans. They may have been removed secretly by night and hidden in the Catacombs of St Sebastian in 258 AD, being returned to their original tombs in 260 when Valerian's reign ended. However, no evidence exists to verify these claims.

== Constantine's basilica ==
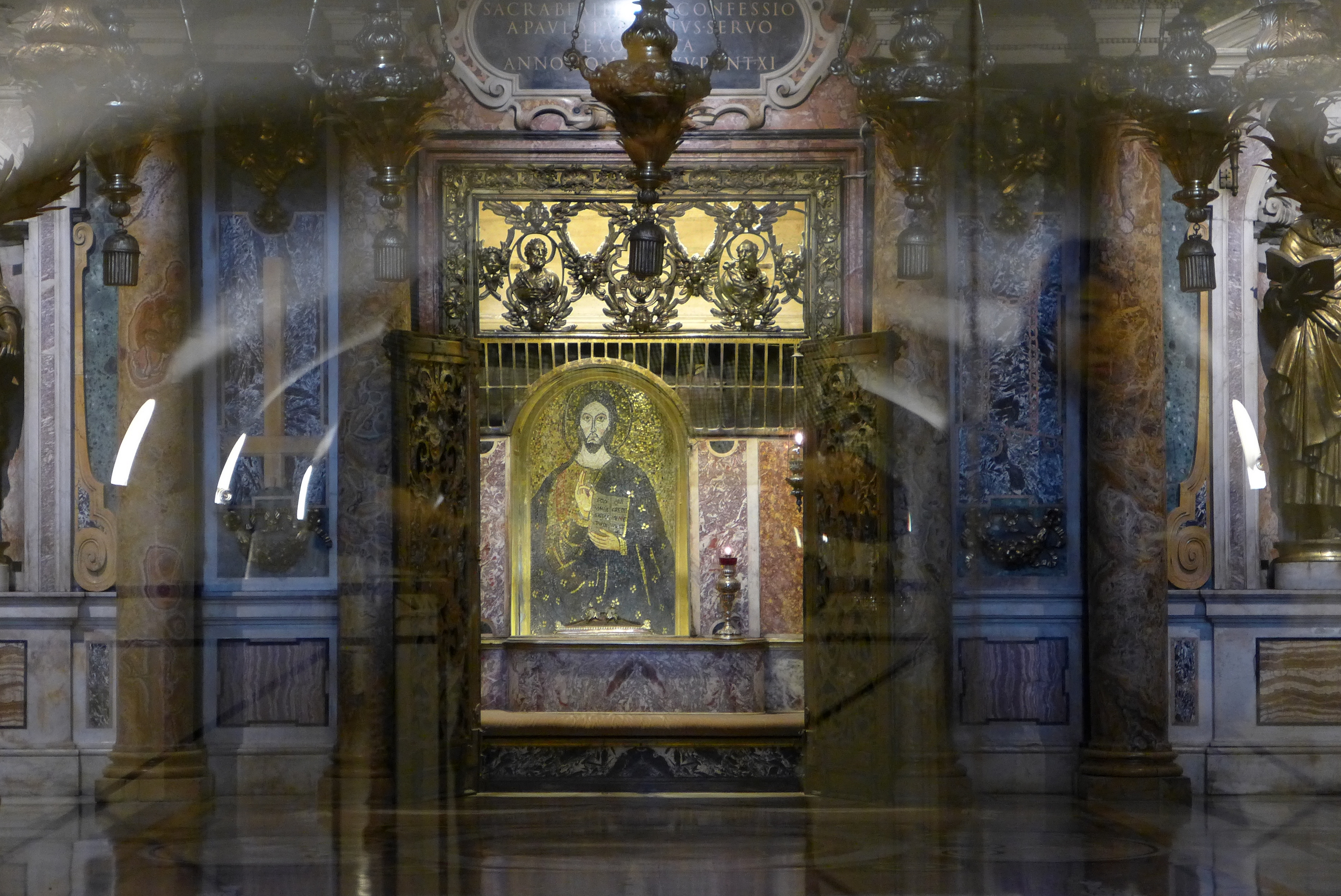
The floor above Saint Peter's tomb (Note: A portion of the aedicula that was part of Peter's tomb rose above level of this floor and was made into the Niche of the Pallium which can be seen in the center of the image.)

When the Church was once more at peace under Constantine the Great, Christians were able at last to build edifices suitable for the celebration of Mass. The resting places of the relics of the Apostles were naturally among the first to be selected as the sites of great basilicas. The emperor supplied funds for these buildings.

Between 320 and 327, Constantine built a five-aisled basilica atop the early Christian necropolis that was purported to be Peter's resting place. Much of the Vatican Hill was leveled to provide a firm foundation for the first St. Peter's Basilica. The altar of the Basilica was planned to be located directly over the tomb. The matter was complicated by the upper chamber or memoria above the vault. This upper chamber had become endeared to the Romans during the ages of persecution, and they were unwilling that it should be destroyed. The memoria was turned into the Chapel of the Confession. Above that was the main floor of the Basilica, with the raised altar directly over the Chapel of the Confession.

The Book of Popes details certain adornments that Constantine apparently added to Saint Peter's tomb at this time. The sarcophagus itself is said to have been enclosed on all sides with bronze, measuring five feet (1.5 m) in each dimension. On top of that was laid a gold cross weighing 150 pounds (68 kg) and featuring an inscription, which translates from Latin as "Constantine Augustus and Helena Augusta This House Shining with Like Royal Splendor a Court Surrounds." However, any treasures that may have been present at the tomb are presumed to have been taken by the Saracens during their Sack of the church in 846.

The skull of Saint Peter is claimed to reside in the Archbasilica of Saint John Lateran since at least the ninth century, alongside the skull of Saint Paul.

== Modern excavation ==
Schematic illustration (not to scale) of the archaeological features beneath St. Peter's Basilica associated with the traditionally identified tomb of the Apostle Peter, showing a 1st-century burial site and later shrine structures. While the remains are those of an elderly male from the period, their attribution to the Apostle Peter is based on later Christian tradition and remains unverified by archaeological evidence. (See picture file for refs).

A tomb had been discovered at the beginning of the 16th century, when the foundations were being laid for the four twisted columns of Gian Lorenzo Bernini's "Confessio". Construction of Constantine's Old St. Peter's Basilica and of foundations for Bernini's Baldacchino destroyed most of the vaulting of these semi-subterranean burial chambers. Among them was the so-called "Tomb of the Julii" with mosaics that appeared to be Christian.

The burial chambers were uncovered again in 1939 as workmen dug a tomb for Pope Pius XI. Over the next ten years, Ludwig Kaas oversaw an archaeological excavation of the pagan mausoleum complex under the foundations of St. Peter's Basilica (the Vatican Necropolis), dating to the 2nd and 3rd centuries. No mausoleum had ever been built directly beneath the present high altar of St Peter's, which did however contain shallow burials, one dated by an impressed tile to the reign of Vespasian; subsequently they had been attended with care, as later burials clustered round but did not encroach upon the space. There was a small niched monument built into a wall ca. 160. The discoveries made the pages of Life magazine.

=== Saint Peter's relics allegedly discovered in 1942 ===
In 1942, the Administrator of St. Peter's, Ludwig Kaas, found remains in a second tomb in the monument. Being concerned that these presumed relics of a saint would not be accorded the respect they deserved, and having little understanding of correct archeological procedures, he secretly ordered these remains stored elsewhere for safe keeping.

After Kaas's death, Margherita Guarducci discovered these relics by chance. She informed Pope Paul VI of her belief that these remains were those of Saint Peter. The anthropological tests on the relics fragmented was done by Professor Venerando Correnti of Palermo University in 1962, the results suggested that the bone fragments belong to a man who was a 60–70 years old and of robust physique. The examinations suggested that the feet of the person were viciously cut as Romans did to crucified corpses because it was easier than removing nails. Carbon analysis has dated the bones to the first century.

On 26 June 1968 Pope Paul VI announced that the relics of Saint Peter had been discovered, with "convincing," yet still circumstantial evidence supporting this claim. This includes nearby graffiti of Saint Peter's name, claiming that he was buried there. Experts also point out that it is clear that the ancient Christians who buried their dead at the site chose to do so based on their belief that Peter was buried there also. On 24 November 2013 a portion of these relics were displayed publicly for the first time, after Pope Francis celebrated the closing 'Year of Faith' Mass.

== Donation of nine bone fragments in 2019 ==
On 2 July 2019 it was announced that Pope Francis had transferred nine bone fragments to Orthodox Ecumenical Patriarch Bartholomew of Constantinople. Bartholomew, the highest ranking hierarch of the Eastern Orthodox Christian Church, described the gesture as "brave and bold." Pope Francis has said his decision was born "out of prayer" and intended as a sign of the ongoing work towards communion between the Orthodox and Catholic Churches. The majority of Saint Peter's remains still reside in Rome, preserved under the high altar of St Peter's Basilica.

== Jerusalem ossuaries ==
In 1953, two Franciscan friars discovered hundreds of 1st century ossuaries stored in a cave on the Mount of Olives near Jerusalem. The archaeologists claimed to have discovered the earliest physical evidence of a Christian community in Jerusalem, and that some of the ossuaries were inscribed with names congruent with many commonly found in the Bible; the name inscribed on one ossuary, for instance, was interpreted as reading 'Shimon Bar Yonah' (שמעון בר יונה, "Simon, the Son of Jonah"). However, several scholars, both Protestant and Catholic, disputed that the tomb belonged to Peter, one of the reasons being that there was no inscription referring to him as 'Cefa' (ܟܹ݁ܐܦ݂ܵܐ) or "Peter". Dr. Stephen Pfann of the University of the Holy Land says the inscription actually reads as 'Shimon Barzillai', the Barzillai being a famous family in Jerusalem. The 43 inscriptions discovered in the Dominus Flevit cemetery between May 1953 and June 1955 were published with photographs by P. B. Bagatti and J. T. Milik in 1958.

== Nearby papal tombs ==
A seventeenth-century map of the papal tombs thought to have been placed near Peter's

Very little is known about the burial of Peter's immediate successors, prior to the period when popes are known with relative certainty to have been buried in the various Catacombs of Rome. Burial near Peter, on Vatican Hill, is attributed to: Pope Linus, Pope Anacletus, Pope Evaristus, Pope Telesphorus, Pope Hyginus, Pope Pius I, Pope Anicetus (later transferred to the Catacomb of Callixtus), Pope Victor I. Epigraphic evidence exists only for Linus, with the discovery of a burial slab marked "Linus" in 1615; however, the slab is broken such that it could have once read "Aquilinus" or "Anullinus".

With three exceptions, each pope before Anicetus, the first pope known to have been entombed in the Catacombs, is traditionally regarded as having been buried near Peter. A notable exception is Pope Clement I, who was traditionally regarded as having been martyred in the Black Sea near Crimea. Similarly, the original tombs of Pope Alexander I and Pope Sixtus I are unknown, although there are several churches positing mutually contradictory claims of translation.

== In popular culture ==
Two books were written about the tomb and bones of St. Peter: The Bones of St Peter by John Evangelist Walsh and The Fisherman's Tomb by John O'Neill.

In April 2017, CNN's Finding Jesus: Faith, Fact, Forgery show featured the story of St. Peter's bones and tomb in its 5th episode from season 2.

The tomb makes an appearance in the 2009 film Angels & Demons in which a container hidden within the tomb holding antimatter is set to explode, destroying Vatican City and symbolically Catholicism itself.

== See also ==
- Maqam Shamoun Al Safa, Lebanon
- Church of Domine Quo Vadis
- Papal tombs
- Index of Vatican City-related articles
- Papal tombs in Old St. Peter's Basilica
- San Pietro in Vincoli
