= Date of the birth of Jesus =

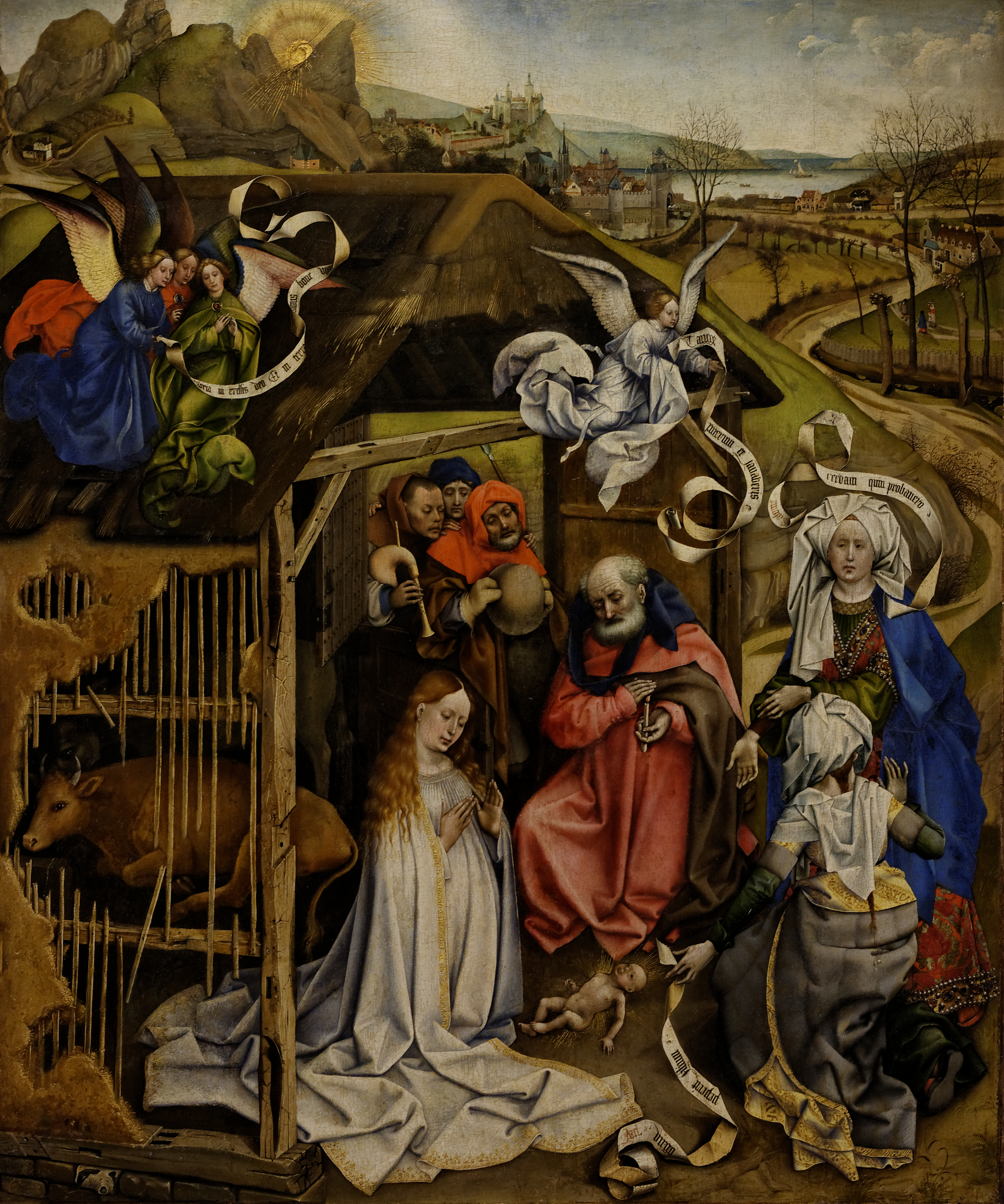
Nativity by Robert Campin (c. 1420), depicting the birth of Jesus during Spring

The date of the birth of Jesus is not stated in the gospels or in any historical sources and the evidence is insufficient to allow for consistent dating. However, most biblical scholars and ancient historians believe that his birth date is around 6 to 4 BC. Two main approaches have been used to estimate the year of the birth of Jesus: one based on the accounts in the Gospels of his birth with reference to King Herod's reign, and the other by subtracting his stated age of "about 30 years" when he began preaching.

Aside from the historiographical approach of anchoring the possible year to certain independently well-documented events mentioned in Matthew and Luke, other techniques used by believers to identify the year of the birth of Jesus have included working backward from the estimation of the start of the ministry of Jesus and assuming that the accounts of astrological portents in the gospels can be associated with certain astronomical alignments or other phenomena.

The day or season has been estimated by various methods, including the description of shepherds watching over their sheep. In the third century, the precise date of Jesus's birth was a subject of great interest, with early Christian writers suggesting various dates in March, April and May.

== Year of birth ==
=== Nativity accounts ===
The nativity accounts in the New Testament gospels of Matthew and Luke do not mention a date or time of year for the birth of Jesus. (Note: Rahner 1975, p. 731 states that the gospels do not, in general, provide enough details of dates to satisfy the demands of modern historians. Most mainline scholars do not see the Luke and Matthew nativity stories as historically factual; Marcus Borg in Borg & Wright 2009, p. 179 states, "I (and most mainline scholars) do not see these stories as historically factual." Funk & Jesus Seminar 1998, p. 499 state, "There is very little in the two infancy narratives that reflects historical reminiscence." For this reason, they do not consider them a reliable method for determining Jesus' date of birth. See also Sanders 1993, pp. 85–88) Karl Rahner states that the authors of the gospels generally focused on theological elements rather than historical chronologies.

Both Luke and Matthew associate Jesus' birth with the time of Herod the Great. Matthew 2:1 states that "Jesus was born in Bethlehem of Judaea in the days of Herod the king". He also implies that Jesus could have been as much as two years old at the time of the visit of the Magi, because Herod ordered the murder of all boys up to the age of two years (Massacre of the Innocents), "in accordance with the time he had learned from the Magi" Matthew 2:16. In addition, if the phrase "about 30" in Luke 3:23 is interpreted to mean 32 years old, this could fit a date of birth just within the reign of Herod, who died in 4 BC according to most scholars.

Luke 1:5 mentions the reign of Herod shortly before the birth of Jesus. This Herod died in 4 BC. Luke 2:1-2 also places the birth during a census decreed by Caesar Augustus, when Quirinius was governing Judah. Some interpreters of Luke determine that this was the Census of Quirinius, which the Jewish historian Josephus described as taking place c. AD 6 in his book Antiquities of the Jews (written c. AD 93), by indicating that Cyrenius/Quirinius began to be the governor of Syria in AD 6 and a census took place during his tenure sometime between AD 6–7. (Note: Josephus 1854, Book 18, Chapters 1–2 indicates that the census under Cyrenius (another form of the name "Quirinius") occurred in the 37th year after Octavian's (i.e., Gaius Julius Caesar Augustus') victory over Marcus Antonius at the Battle of Actium, which secular historical records date to 2 September 31 BC. Therefore 31 BC + 37 years which is AD 6–7. Most scholars therefore believe Luke made an error when referring to the census.(Archer 1982, p. 366)) (Note: Brown 1978, p. 17 notes that "most critical scholars acknowledge a confusion and misdating on Luke's part". See for example, Dunn 2003, p. 344 Similarly, Gruen 1996, p. 157, Vermes 2006, p. 96, Davies & Sanders 1984, Brown 1977, p. 554, Harvey 2004, p. 221, Meier 1991, p. 213, Millar 1990, pp. 355–381, and A. N. Sherwin-White, pp. 166, 167.) Since Herod died a decade before this census, most scholars generally accept a date of birth between 6 and 4 BC. On the other hand, a census was not a unique event in the Roman Empire. For example, Tertullian argued that a number of censuses were performed throughout the Roman world under Sentius Saturninus at the same time. Some biblical scholars and commentators believe the two accounts can be harmonized, arguing that the text in Luke can be read as "registration before (πρώτη) Quirinius was governor of Syria", i.e., that Luke was actually referring to a completely different census, though this understanding of the Greek word has been rejected by scholars. (Note: In the words of Vermes 2006, pp. 28–30 these arguments have been rejected by the mainstream as "exegetical acrobatics", springing from the assumption that the Bible is inerrant,(Novak 2001, pp. 296–297) and most scholars have concluded that Luke's account is an error.(Brown 1978, p. 17))

=== Backdating from the beginning of the ministry of Jesus ===
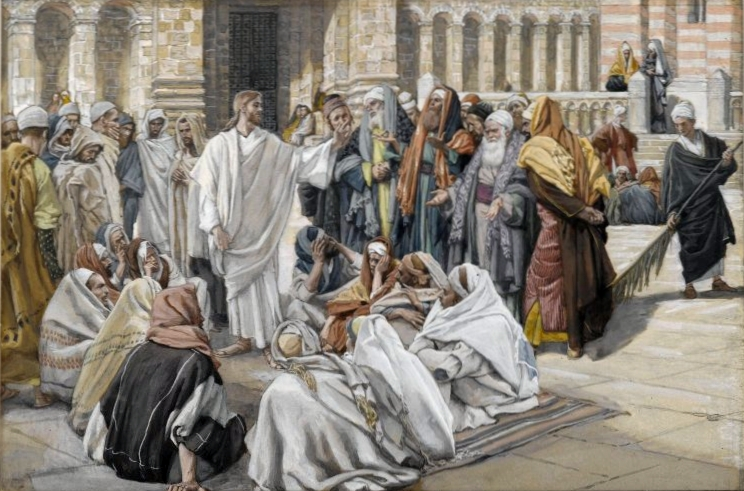
Dispute of Jesus and the Pharisees, by James Tissot, c. 1890

Another approach to estimating the year of birth is based on an attempt to work backwards from the point when Jesus began preaching, using the statement in Luke 3:23 that he was "about 30 years of age" at that time. Jesus began to preach after being baptized by John the Baptist, and based on Luke's gospel John only began baptizing people in "the fifteenth year of the reign of Tiberius Caesar" (Luke 3:1–2), which scholars estimate would place the year at about AD 28–29. By working backwards from this, it would appear that Jesus was probably born no later than 1 BC. Another theory is that Herod's death was as late as after the January eclipse of 1 BC or even AD 1 after the eclipse that occurred in 1 December BC.

Luke's date is independently confirmed by John's reference in John 2:20 to the Temple being in its 46th year of construction when Jesus began his ministry during Passover, which corresponds to around AD 27–29 according to scholarly estimates.

=== Dates based on the Star of Bethlehem ===
Most scholars regard the Star of Bethlehem account to be a pious fiction, of literary and theological value, rather than historical. Nonetheless, attempts have been made to interpret it as an astronomical event, which might then help date Jesus' birth through the use of ancient astronomical records, or modern astronomical calculations. The first such attempt was made by Johannes Kepler who interpreted the account to describe a great conjunction. Other astronomical events have been considered, including a close planetary conjunction between Venus and Jupiter in 2 BC or a comet in 5 BC.

=== Date of Herod's death ===
Most scholars concerning the date of Herod's death follow Emil Schürer's calculations published in 1896, which revised a traditional death date of 1 BC to 4 BC. Two of Herod's sons, Archelaus and Philip the Tetrarch, dated their rule from 4 BC, though Archelaus apparently held royal authority during Herod's lifetime. Philip's reign would last for 37 years, until his death in the traditionally accepted 20th year of Tiberius (AD 34), which implies his accession as 4 BC.

In 1998, David Beyer published that the oldest Latin manuscripts of Josephus' Antiquities have the death of Philip in the 22nd year of Tiberius (and not the 20th year, as shown in later editions of the Antiquities). In the British Library, there is not a single manuscript prior to AD 1544 that has the traditionally accepted 20th year of Tiberius for the death of Philip. This evidence removes the main obstacle for a later date of 1 BC for the death of Herod. Beyer's arguments have been questioned by Raymond Jachowski, who argued that Beyer only used ill-attested Latin translations instead of the original Greek manuscripts, some of which date to the 14th and 11th centuries. Nevertheless, other scholars support the traditional date of 1 BC for Herod's death, and argue that his heirs backdated their reigns to 4 or 3 BC to assert an overlapping with Herod's rule and bolster their own legitimacy, something that had already been done by a few rulers before them.

=== According to Dionysius Exiguus: the Anno Domini system ===
The Anno Domini dating system was devised in 525 by Dionysius Exiguus to enumerate the years in his Easter table. His system was to replace the Diocletian era that had been used in older Easter tables, as he did not wish to continue the memory of a tyrant who persecuted Christians. The last year of the old table, Diocletian Anno Martyrium 247, was immediately followed by the first year of his table, Anno Domini 532. When Dionysius devised his table, Julian calendar years were identified by naming the consuls who held office that year—Dionysius himself stated that the "present year" was "the consulship of Probus Junior", which was 525 years "since the incarnation of our Lord Jesus Christ". Thus, Dionysius implied that Jesus' incarnation occurred 525 years earlier, without stating the specific year during which his birth or conception occurred. "However, nowhere in his exposition of his table does Dionysius relate his epoch to any other dating system, whether consulate, Olympiad, year of the world, or regnal year of Augustus; much less does he explain or justify the underlying date."

Bonnie J. Blackburn and Leofranc Holford-Strevens briefly present arguments for 2 BC, 1 BC, or AD 1 as the year Dionysius intended for the Nativity or Incarnation. Among the sources of confusion are:

- In modern times, Incarnation is synonymous with the conception, but some ancient writers, such as Bede, considered incarnation to be synonymous with the Nativity.
- The civil or consular year began on 1 January, but the Diocletian year began on 1 September.
- There were inaccuracies in the lists of consuls.
- There were confused summations of emperors' regnal years.

It is not known how Dionysius established the year of Jesus's birth. One major theory is that Dionysius based his calculation on the Gospel of Luke, which states that Jesus was "about thirty years old" shortly after "the fifteenth year of the reign of Tiberius Caesar" (AD 28/29), and hence subtracted thirty years from that date, or that Dionysius counted back 532 years from the first year of his table because the dates of Easter repeats every 532 years. Ancient historians such as Tertullian, Eusebius and Epiphanius all agree that Jesus was born in 2 BC, probably following the statement of Jesus' age (i.e. subtracting thirty years to AD 29). Alternatively, Dionysius may have used an earlier unknown source. The Chronograph of 354 states that Jesus was born during the consulship of Caesar and Paullus (AD 1), but the logic behind this is also unknown.

It has been speculated by Georges Declercq that Dionysius' desire to replace Diocletian years with a calendar based on the incarnation of Jesus was intended to prevent people from believing the imminent end of the world. At the time, it was believed by some that the resurrection of the dead and end of the world would occur 500 years after the birth of Jesus. The old Anno Mundi calendar theoretically commenced with the creation of the world based on information in the Old Testament. It was believed that, based on the Anno Mundi calendar, Jesus was born in the year 5500 (5500 years after the world was created) with the year 6000 of the Anno Mundi calendar marking the end of the world. Anno Mundi 6000 (approximately AD 500) was thus equated with the end of the world but this date had already passed in the time of Dionysius. The Historia Brittonum attributed to Nennius written in the 9th century makes extensive use of the Anno Passionis (AP) dating system which was in common use as well as the newer AD dating system. The AP dating system took its start from 'The Year of The Passion'. It is generally accepted by experts there is a 27-year difference between AP and AD reference.

Pope Benedict XVI states that Dionysius Exiguus committed an error.

=== According to Jewish sources ===
Similarities between the Yeshu mentioned in some rabbinic literature and the Christian Jesus have led some researchers to speculate that the former is a reference to the latter. (See for example Jesus in the Talmud.) This opinion is disputed however, as Yeshu also can mean "may his name and memory be blotted out", probably used as a damnatio memoriae to censor certain names. It is claimed in the Talmud that Yeshu was born during the reign of Alexander Jannaeus, who ruled from 103 BC to 76 BC. Furthermore, Sanhedrin 107b and Sotah 47a mention Yeshu taking refuge in Egypt during Alexander's persecution of Pharisees (88–76 BC). Therefore, it can be assumed the Yeshu of the Talmud was born after 103 BC but before 88 BC. Hagigah 2:2 also depicts Yeshu similarly, while also claiming that Yeshu became an apostate during his refuge in Egypt.

The Talmudic claim that Yeshu was born c. 103–88 BC is also repeated in the Toledot Yeshu, an 11th-century Jewish text, (Note: In 1903, G.R.S. Mead, a well known theosophist, published Did Jesus Live 100 BC?, which treated the Toledot Yeshu as sufficiently authentic and reliable to postulate, on the basis of its mention of historic figures such as Queen Helene, that Jesus actually lived a century earlier than commonly believed.) which implies that this belief was held by at least some Jews at that time. Baring-Gould (page 71) points out that the Wagenseil version of the Toledot Yeshu incorrectly names the Queen as Helene and describes her as the widow of Alexander Jannaeus who died in 76 BC. (her name was in fact Salome Alexandra, and she died in 67 BC). The Yeshu of the Toledot Yeshu clearly refers to Jesus of Nazareth, and there is no possibility that he is another person named Yeshu because the tract was specifically written as a response to the claims of the canonical gospels. It circulated widely in Europe and the Middle East during the Middle Ages as a Jewish response to the Christian account. A 15th-century Yemenite version of the text is titled Maaseh Yeshu, or the "Episode of Jesus"—in which Jesus is described as being the son of either Joseph or Pandera—repeats the same claim about the date when Yeshu lived. However, scholarly consensus generally sees the Toledot Yeshu as an unreliable source for the historical Jesus. (Note: According to Van Voorst, "It may contain a few older traditions from ancient Jewish polemics against Christians, but we learn nothing new or significant from it". However, Jane Schaberg contends that the Toledot lends weight to the theory that Mary conceived Jesus as the result of being raped.)

== Day of birth ==
In the third century, the precise date of Jesus's birth became a subject of great interest, with early Christian writers suggesting various dates. Around AD 200, Clement of Alexandria wrote:

There are those who have determined not only the year of our Lord's birth, but also the day; and they say that it took place in the 28th year of Augustus, and in the 25th day of [the Egyptian month] Pachon [20 May] ... Further, others say that He was born on the 24th or 25th of Pharmuthi [20 or 21 April].

=== Choice of 25 December ===
There are two main hypotheses as to why 25 December was chosen as Jesus's birthday.

Various factors contributed to the choice of date, although theology professor Susan Roll wrote in 1995: "No liturgical historian ... goes so far as to deny that it has any sort of relation with the sun, the winter solstice and the popularity of solar worship in the later Roman Empire". In the Roman calendar, 25 December was the date of the winter solstice. The Calendar of Antiochus of Athens, c. 2nd century AD, marks 25 December as the "birthday of the Sun". Around AD 238, Censorinus wrote in De Die Natali that the winter solstice was the "birth of the Sun". From AD 274, the Roman festival Dies Natalis Solis Invicti, birthday of the god Sol Invictus (the 'Invincible Sun'), was held on 25 December.

The earliest evidence of Jesus's birth being marked on 25 December is the Chronograph of 354, also called the Calendar of Filocalus. Liturgical historians generally agree that this part of the text was written in Rome in AD 336. A passage in one version of Commentary on the Prophet Daniel, originally written around AD 204 by Hippolytus of Rome, identifies 25 December as Jesus's birth date, but this passage is considered a much later interpolation. (Note: Elsewhere, the text is recorded as "For as the times are noted from the foundation of the world, and reckoned from Adam, they set clearly before us the matter with which our inquiry deals. For the first appearance of our Lord in the flesh took place in Bethlehem, under Augustus, in the year 5500; and He suffered in the thirty-third year" with no mention of 25 December.)

Later in the fourth century, some Christian writers acknowledged that Christmas coincided with the winter solstice, and saw the lengthening days after the winter solstice as symbolizing the Light of Christ entering the world. In a late fourth-century sermon, Saint Augustine said:

He [Jesus] was born on the day which is the shortest in our earthly reckoning and from which subsequent days begin to increase in length. He, therefore, who bent low and lifted us up chose the shortest day, yet the one whence light begins to increase.

The Christian treatise De solstitiis et aequinoctiis conceptionis et nativitatis Domini Nostri Iesu Christi et Iohannis Baptistae ('On the solstice and equinox conception and birth of Our Lord Jesus Christ and John the Baptist'), from the second half of the fourth century, is the earliest known text dating John's birth to the summer solstice and Jesus's birth to the winter solstice. The author says that the lengthening days after midwinter and shortening days after midsummer reflects John's remark that "He [Jesus] must increase, but I must decrease" (John 3:30). Steven Hijmans of the University of Alberta concludes: "It is cosmic symbolism ... which inspired the Church leadership in Rome" to choose the winter solstice as the birthday of Jesus and the summer solstice as that of John, "supplemented by the equinoxes as their respective dates of conception".

25 December was also nine months after 25 March, a date chosen as Jesus's conception (the Annunciation) and the date of the spring equinox on the Roman calendar.

=== History of religions hypothesis ===
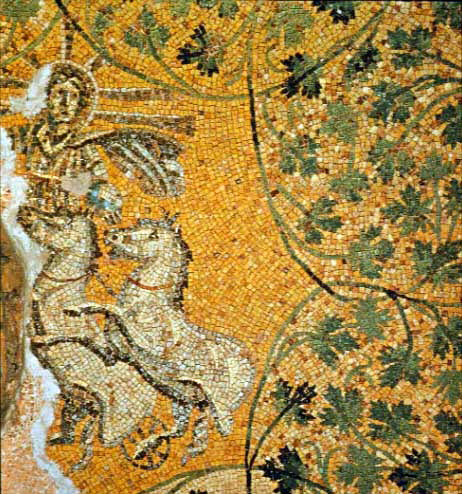
A mosaic dated to around AD 300 in the Tomb of the Julii, an apparently Christian tomb in the Vatican Necropolis. Most scholars believe it depicts Jesus as the sun god Sol / Helios.

Based on this winter solstice link, the "History of Religions hypothesis" or "Substitution theory" proposes the Church chose 25 December as the birthday of Jesus (dies Natalis Christi) to appropriate the Roman festival of the birthday of the Invincible Sun (dies Natalis Solis Invicti), held on the same date. It honored the sun god Sol Invictus, and some scholars hold that it was instituted by the Emperor Aurelian in AD 274. In Rome, this yearly festival was celebrated with thirty chariot races. Christmas thus emerged during "the peak of state-supported sun worship" in the Empire, where most Christians lived. As noted above, the earliest evidence for Christ's birth being marked on 25 December dates from sixty years after Aurelian.

In AD 362, the Emperor Julian wrote in his Hymn to King Helios that the Agon Solis (sacred contest for Sol) was a festival of the sun, instituted by Emperor Aurelian, held at the end of the Saturnalia in late December. Gary Forsythe, Professor of Ancient History, says: "This celebration would have formed a welcome addition to the seven-day period of the Saturnalia (17–23 December), Rome's most joyous holiday season since Republican times, characterized by parties, banquets, and exchanges of gifts." Around AD 200, Tertullian had berated Christians for taking part in, and even adopting, the pagan Saturnalia festival.

At the time when Christmas emerged, some Christian writers likened Jesus to the Sun and referred to him as the 'Sun of Righteousness' (Sol Justitiae) prophesied by Malachi.

The Christian treatise De solstitiis et aequinoctiis, from the late fourth century AD, associates Jesus's birth with the "birthday of the sun" and Sol Invictus:

Our Lord, too, is born in the month of December ... the eighth before the calends of January [25 December] ... But they [the pagans] call it the 'birthday of the invincible one' (Invictus). But who then is as invincible as our Lord who defeated the death he suffered? Or if they say that this is the birthday of the sun, well He Himself is the Sun of Justice.

Early in the fifth century, Maximus of Turin said in a Christmas sermon:

People frequently call this day of the Lord's birth 'the new sun' ... even the Jews and pagans agree to the name. This should willingly be accepted by us, since with the rising of the Savior there is salvation not only for the human race, but even the brilliance of the sun itself is renewed.

In a mid fifth century Christmas sermon, Pope Leo I admonishes Christians who bow their heads to the Sun as they enter Old St. Peter's Basilica. In another Christmas sermon, he rebukes those "who hold the pernicious belief that our celebration today seems to derive ... from, as they say, the rising of the 'new sun'". Susan Roll writes that "this testimony to the deep-rootedness and continued popularity of the civil sun-cult" has been put forward as evidence of the Substitution theory.

The theory is mentioned in an annotation of uncertain date added to a manuscript by 12th-century Syrian bishop Jacob Bar-Salibi. The scribe wrote:

It was a custom of the Pagans to celebrate on the same 25 December the birthday of the Sun, at which they kindled lights in token of festivity. In these solemnities and revelries, the Christians also took part. Accordingly, when the doctors of the Church perceived that the Christians had a leaning to this festival, they took counsel and resolved that the true Nativity should be solemnised on that day.

In the 17th century, Isaac Newton, who was coincidentally born on 25 December, suggested the date of Christmas was chosen to correspond with the winter solstice. In 1743, German scholar Paul Ernst Jablonski argued the date was chosen to correspond with the Natalis Solis Invicti. The hypothesis was first developed substantially by Hermann Usener, a fellow German scholar, in 1889 and adopted by many scholars thereafter.

Steven Hijmans of the University of Alberta says that in recent years "a fair number of scholars" have abandoned the idea that the date was chosen to appropriate the pagan festival. He agrees that the Church chose the date because it was the winter solstice, but he argues that, "While they were aware that pagans called this day the 'birthday' of Sol Invictus, this did not concern them and it did not play any role in their choice of date for Christmas." Hijmans says: "while the winter solstice on or around December 25 was well established in the Roman imperial calendar, there is no evidence that a religious celebration of Sol on that day antedated the celebration of Christmas." Thomas Talley argues that Aurelian instituted the Dies Natalis Solis Invicti partly to give a pagan significance to a date he argues was already important for Christians. According to C. Philipp E. Nothaft, a professor at Trinity College Dublin, though the history of religions hypothesis "is nowadays used as the default explanation for the choice of 25 December as Christ's birthday, few advocates of this theory seem to be aware of how paltry the available evidence actually is".

=== Calculation hypothesis ===
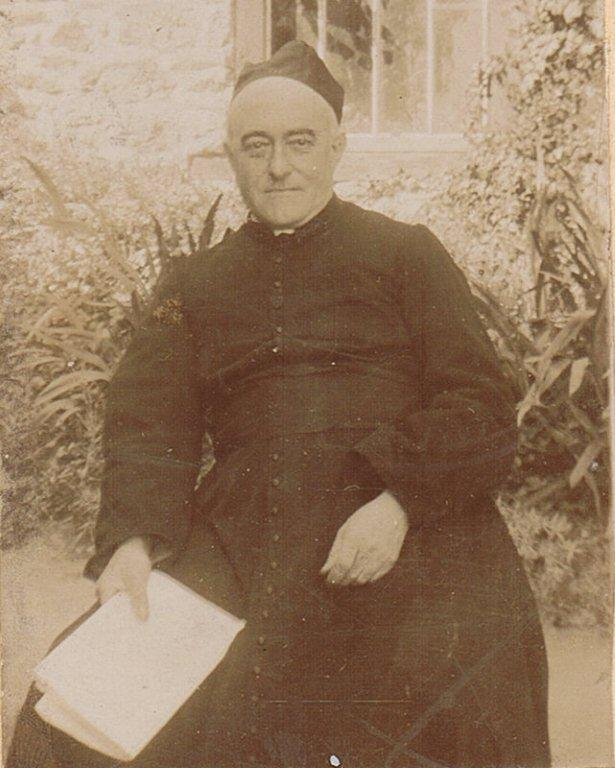
The 'calculation hypothesis' was proposed by Louis Duchesne, a priest and historian of Christianity.

The "Calculation hypothesis" suggests that 25 December was chosen based on numerology and because it was nine months after a date chosen as Jesus's conception (the Annunciation): 25 March, the Roman date of the spring equinox. The hypothesis was first proposed by French priest and historian Louis Duchesne in 1889. The Oxford Companion to Christian Thought remarks that the "calculations hypothesis potentially establishes 25 December as a Christian festival before Aurelian's decree".

The ancient Babylonian calendar began at the spring equinox, at which time they recited their creation myth, the Enūma Eliš. Due to Babylonian influence, the year's beginning in the Hebrew calendar shifted to the spring equinox. In AD 221, Sextus Julius Africanus suggested the spring equinox, 25 March in the Roman calendar, as the first day of creation and of Jesus's conception; the Church later came to celebrate this as the Feast of the Annunciation. As day and night are equal on the equinox, this was linked to the separation of light and dark in the Genesis creation story. While this implies a birth in December and possibly on the 25th, Africanus did not offer a birth date for Jesus, and was not an influential writer at the time. Thomas C. Schmidt argues that Hippolytus of Rome (early 3rd century) dated the birth of Jesus to 25 December. According to Schimdt, Hippolytus in his Canon placed Jesus's conception during the feast of Passover. Since Hippolytus also wrote in his Chronicon that Jesus was born nine months after the anniversary of the world's creation (which he also believed to have occurred during a Passover and on 25 March), this implies that Hippolytus thought Jesus was born on 25 December.

Some early Christians marked Jesus's crucifixion on a date they deemed equivalent to the 14th of Nisan, the day before Passover in the Hebrew calendar. This feast was referred to as the Quartodeciman (Latin for 'fourteenth'). Some early Christian writers equated the 14th of Nisan with the equinox on 25 March, and made the date of his conception or birth the same as that of his death. Duchesne conjectured that Jesus was thought to have been born and died on the same day, so lived a whole number of years, "since symbolic number systems do not permit the imperfection of fractions". However, he admitted that this theory is not supported by any early Christian text.

Adam C. English, professor of religion at Campbell University, has argued for the veracity of 25 December as Jesus's date of birth. The Gospel of Luke says that John the Baptist's conception was foretold to Zechariah when he was serving as a priest at the Temple in Jerusalem. It further says that Jesus's conception was announced when John's mother was six months pregnant. English suggests that John was conceived on Yom Kippur, and dates this to the autumn equinox the year before Jesus's birth. He thus dates Jesus's conception to the following spring equinox and concludes that Jesus was born on 25 December. According to Normand Bonneau, earlier Christians also conjectured this.

Susan Roll says the calculation hypothesis is historically the minority opinion on the origin of Christmas, but was "taught in graduate liturgy programs as a thoroughly viable hypothesis". Critics of the theory, such as Bernard Botte, believe that the calculations are merely attempts by early Christians to retroactively justify the winter solstice date. Hieronymus Engberding, a supporter of the theory, also conceded that the calculations were most likely devised after the fact, to justify a date already established and to highlight "God's interlocking plan". Susan Roll questions whether "ordinary Christians in the third and fourth centuries [were] much interested in calculations with symbolic numbers in fantasy-combinations". Likewise, Gerard Rouwhorst believes it is unlikely that feasts emerged purely "on the basis of calculations by exegetes and theologians", arguing "For a feast to take root in a community more is needed than a sophisticated computation".

== Season of birth ==
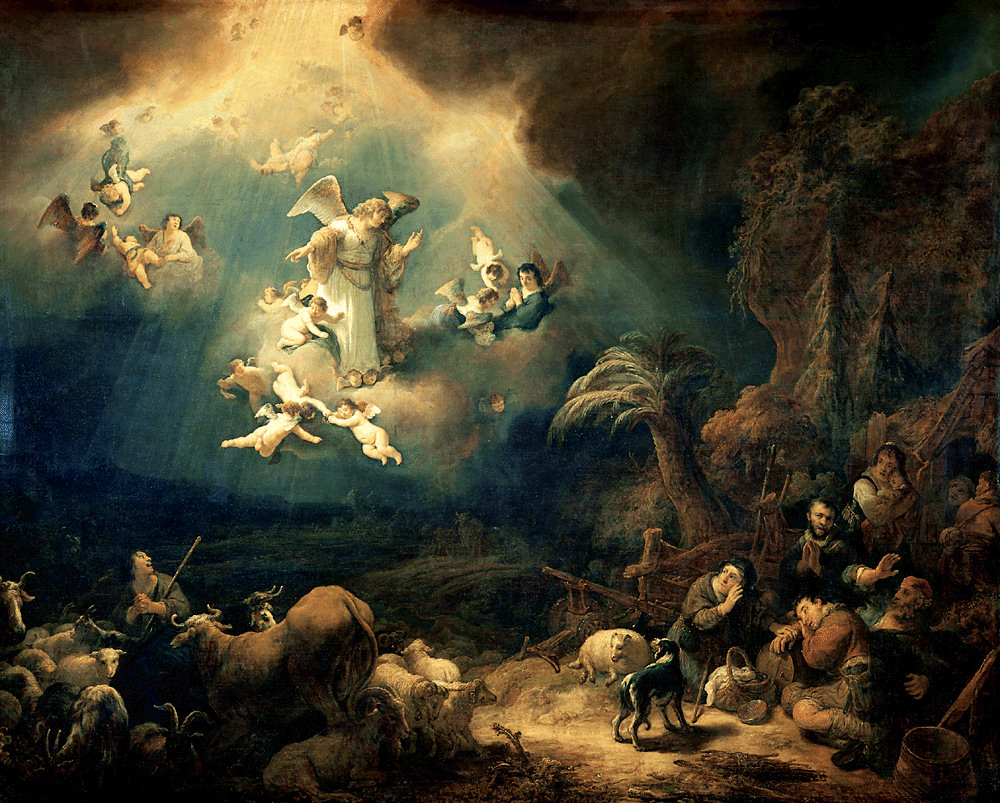
The Angel Appearing to the Shepherds, Govert Flinck, 1639. The presence of the shepherds is important in determining the date of Jesus's birth.

Despite the modern celebration of Christmas in December, neither the Gospel of Luke nor Gospel of Matthew mention a season for Jesus' birth. Scholarly arguments have been made regarding whether shepherds would have been grazing their flock during the winter, with some scholars challenging a winter birth for Jesus, and some defending the idea by citing the mildness of winters in Judea and rabbinic rules regarding sheep near Bethlehem before February, not January.

== Other religious views ==
=== Islamic view ===
The Qur'an, which is the source of Islamic tradition, tells the story of Mary and the birth of Jesus (known in Islam as 'Īsā) most prominently in Chapter 19. According to verse 19:25, during labor Mary was told to shake a palm tree so that ripe dates would fall off. This description, combined with the ripening period of dates places the birth of Jesus somewhere between June and October, with later times being more likely due to dates falling off easily. In the hadith compilation Tuhaf al-Uqul, the sixth imam, Jafar As Sadiq stated when approached about the birth of Jesus during Christmas, "They have lied. Rather, it was in the middle of June. The day and night become even [equal] in the middle of March." The "middle of June" does not necessarily refer to the fifteenth of June but it is in reference to a day near the summer solstice. Sadiq mentioned the vernal equinox, which takes place near the middle of March, to make a point about the equal length of the day and night, and consequently pointed out, by antithesis, the summer solstice.

=== Jehovah's Witnesses' view ===
Jehovah's Witnesses believe that Christmas stems from pagan traditions and was not observed by the earliest Christians. They reject the idea that Jesus was born on 25 December, viewing this date as a later addition made by the Church in the fourth century. According to their belief, when Christianity became the Roman Empire's official religion, it replaced the pagan festival of Saturnalia with Christmas, aligning it with the winter solstice. They also assert that many Christmas symbols have pagan roots—for instance, decorative lights symbolize the sun’s return, and Father Christmas is derived from various religious and cultural traditions. Jehovah's Witnesses argue that it is improbable shepherds, mentioned in the biblical account of Jesus' birth, would have been in the fields during winter. They suggest that a more likely time for Jesus' birth was around early October in the year 2 BC.

== See also ==
- Adoration of the shepherds
- Anno Domini
- Ante Christum Natum
- Baptism of Jesus
- Christ myth theory
- Chronology of Jesus
- Common Era
- Detailed Christian timeline
- Dionysius Exiguus
- Gospel harmony
- Historical Jesus
- Historicity of Jesus
- Jesus in Christianity
- Life of Jesus in the New Testament
- Timeline of the Bible
- Venerable Bede
- Talmud's claim that Jesus was born before 88 BCE
