= Sol Invictus =

Late Roman solar deity

- God of the Sun
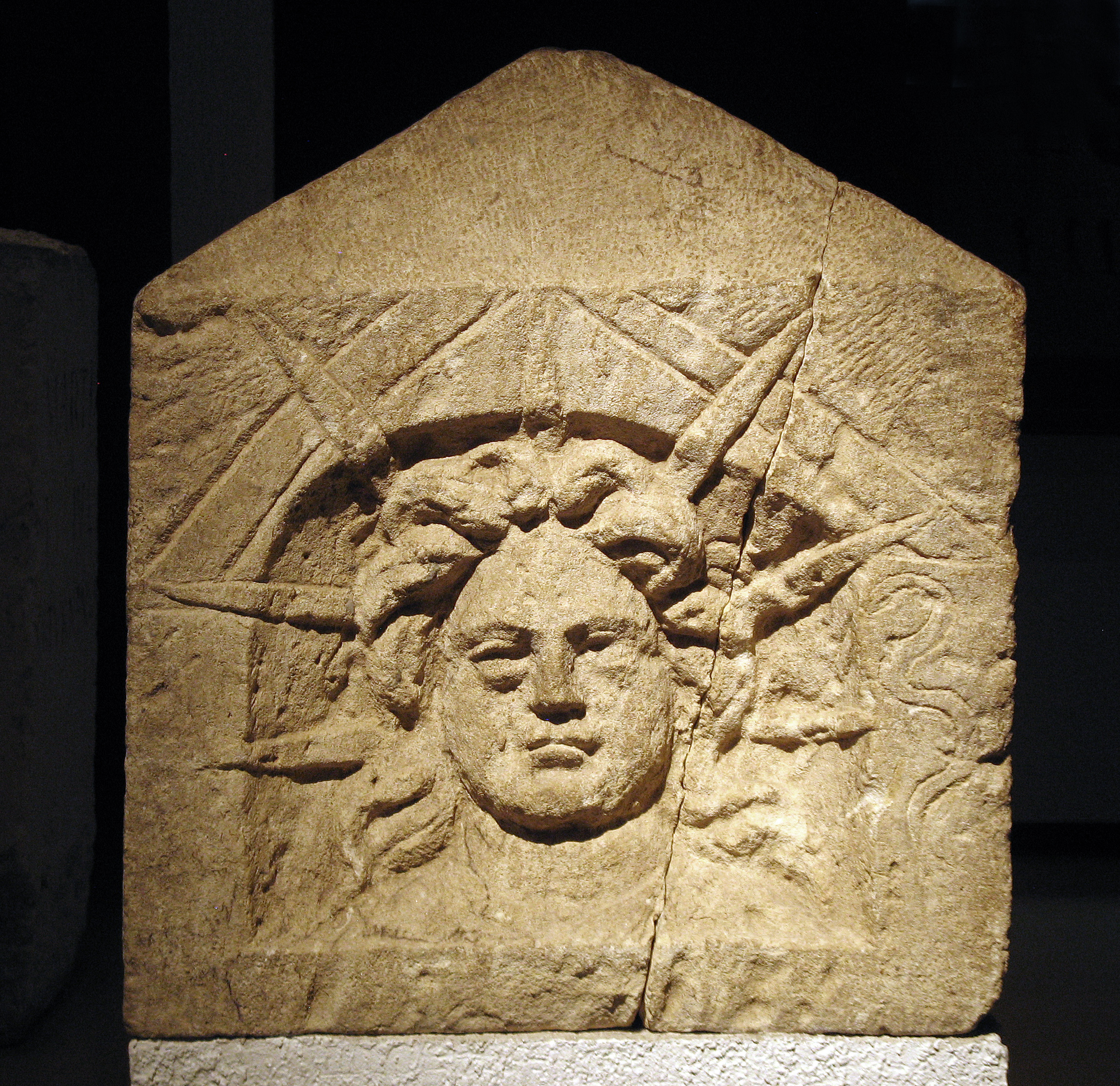
- A relief of Sol from Roman Lugdunum, 2nd–3rd century AD
- Other names: Sol, Elagabalus (Disputed)
- Major cult center: Temple of the Sun
- Abode: The sky
- Planet: Sun
- Symbols: Sunburst, halo, radiate crown
- Day: Sunday
- Gender: Male
- Festivals: Dies Natalis Solis Invicti (25 December)

Equivalents
- Greek: Helios
- Syrian: Elagabalus/Malakbel

Sol Invictus (Classical Latin: [ˈsoːɫ ɪnˈwɪktʊs], 'Invincible Sun' or 'Unconquered Sun') was the official sun god of the late Roman Empire and a later aspect of, or replacement for, the old Latin god Sol. The emperor Aurelian revived his cult in AD 274 and promoted Sol Invictus as the chief god of the empire. From Aurelian onward, Sol Invictus often appeared on imperial coinage, usually shown wearing a sun crown and driving a horse-drawn chariot through the sky. His prominence lasted until the emperor Constantine I legalized Christianity and restricted paganism. (Note: "Up to the conversion of Constantine the Great, the cult of Deus Sol Invictus received the full support of the emperors: The many coins showing the sun god that these emperors struck provide official evidence of this." and "the custom of representing Deus Sol Invictus on coins came to an end in AD 323.") The last known inscription referring to Sol Invictus dates to AD 387, (Note: "Corpus Inscriptionum Latinarum CIL VI, 1778 dates from 387 AD") although there were enough devotees in the fifth century that the Christian theologian Augustine found it necessary to preach against them. (Note: Augustine, Sermones, XII (see Halsberghe 1972, p. 170, n.4); also in Ennaratio in Psalmum XXV; Ennaratio II, 3.)

In recent years, the scholarly community has become divided on Sol between traditionalists and a growing group of revisionists. In the traditional view, Sol Invictus was the second of two different sun gods in Rome. The first of these, Sol Indiges, or Sol, was believed to be an early Roman god of minor importance whose cult had petered out by the first century AD. Sol Invictus, on the other hand, was believed to be a Syrian sun god whose cult was first promoted in Rome under Elagabalus, without success. Some fifty years later, in 274 AD, Aurelian established the cult of Sol Invictus as an official religion. There has never been consensus on which Syrian sun god he might have been: some scholars opted for the sky god of Emesa, Elagabal, while others preferred Malakbel of Palmyra. In the revisionist view, there was only one cult of Sol in Rome, continuous from the monarchy to the end of antiquity. There were at least three temples of Sol in Rome, all active during the Empire and all dating from the earlier Republic.

== Invictus as epithet ==
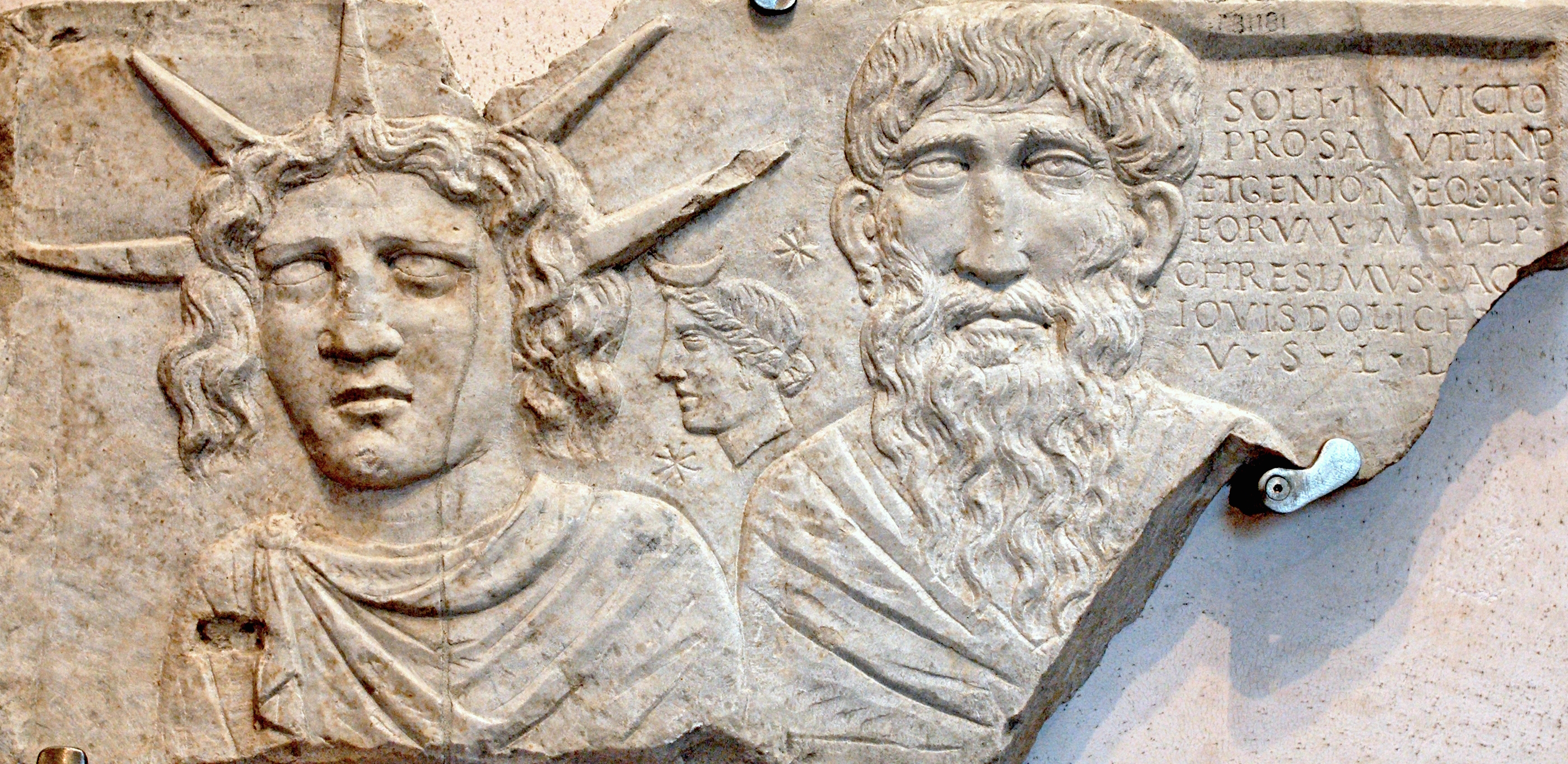
Dedication made by a priest of Jupiter Dolichenus on behalf of the well-being (salus) of the emperors, to Sol Invictus and the Genius of the military unit equites singulares Augusti

Invictus ("unconquered, invincible") was an epithet utilized for several Roman deities, including Jupiter, Mars, Hercules, Apollo, and Silvanus. It had been in use from the 3rd century BC. The Roman cult to Sol is continuous from the "earliest history" of the city until the institution of Christianity as the exclusive state religion. Scholars have sometimes regarded the traditional Sol Indiges and Sol Invictus as two separate deities, but the rejection of this view by S. E. Hijmans has found supporters. (Note: Hijmans 2009, Chapter 1 (a reworking of Hijmans (1996)); Matern 2002; Wallraff 2001; and Berrens 2004 all follow Hijmans.)

An inscription of AD 102 records a restoration of a portico of Sol in what is now the Trastevere area of Rome by a certain Gaius Iulius Anicetus. While he may have had in mind an allusion to his own cognomen, which is the Latinized form of the Greek equivalent of Invictus, i.e. Ἀνίκητος (Anikētos, Romanized: Anicetus), the earliest extant dated inscription that uses Invictus as an epithet of Sol is from AD 158. (Note: Soli Invicto deo / ex voto suscepto / accepta missione / honesta ex nume/ro eq(uitum) sing(ularium) Aug(usti) P(ublius) / Aelius Amandus / d(e)d(icavit) Tertullo et / Sacerdoti co(n)s(ulibus) Publius Aelius Amandus dedicated this to the god Sol Invictus in accordance with the vow he had made, upon his honorable discharge from the equestrian guard of the emperor, during the consulship of Tertullus and Sacerdos.) Another, stylistically dated to the 2nd century, is inscribed on a Roman phalera (ornamental disk): inventori lucis soli invicto augusto ("I glorify the unconquerable sun, the creator of light"). (Note: An illustration is provided inKantorowicz 1961.) Augustus is a regular epithet linking deities to the Imperial cult. Sol Invictus played a prominent role in the Mithraic mysteries, and was equated with Mithras. The relation of the Mithraic Sol Invictus to the public cult of the deity with the same name is unclear and perhaps non-existent.

== Elagabalus ==
According to the Historia Augusta, Elagabalus, the teenaged Severan heir, adopted the name of his deity and brought his cult image from Emesa to Rome. Once installed as emperor, he neglected Rome's traditional State deities and promoted his own as Rome's most powerful deity. This ended with his murder in 222. The Historia Augusta equates the deity Elagabalus with Jupiter and Sol: fuit autem Heliogabali vel Iovis vel Solis sacerdos, "He was also a priest of Heliogabalus, or Jove, or Sol". While this has been seen as an attempt to import the Syrian sun god to Rome, the Roman cult of Sol had existed in Rome at least since the early Republic.

== Aurelian ==
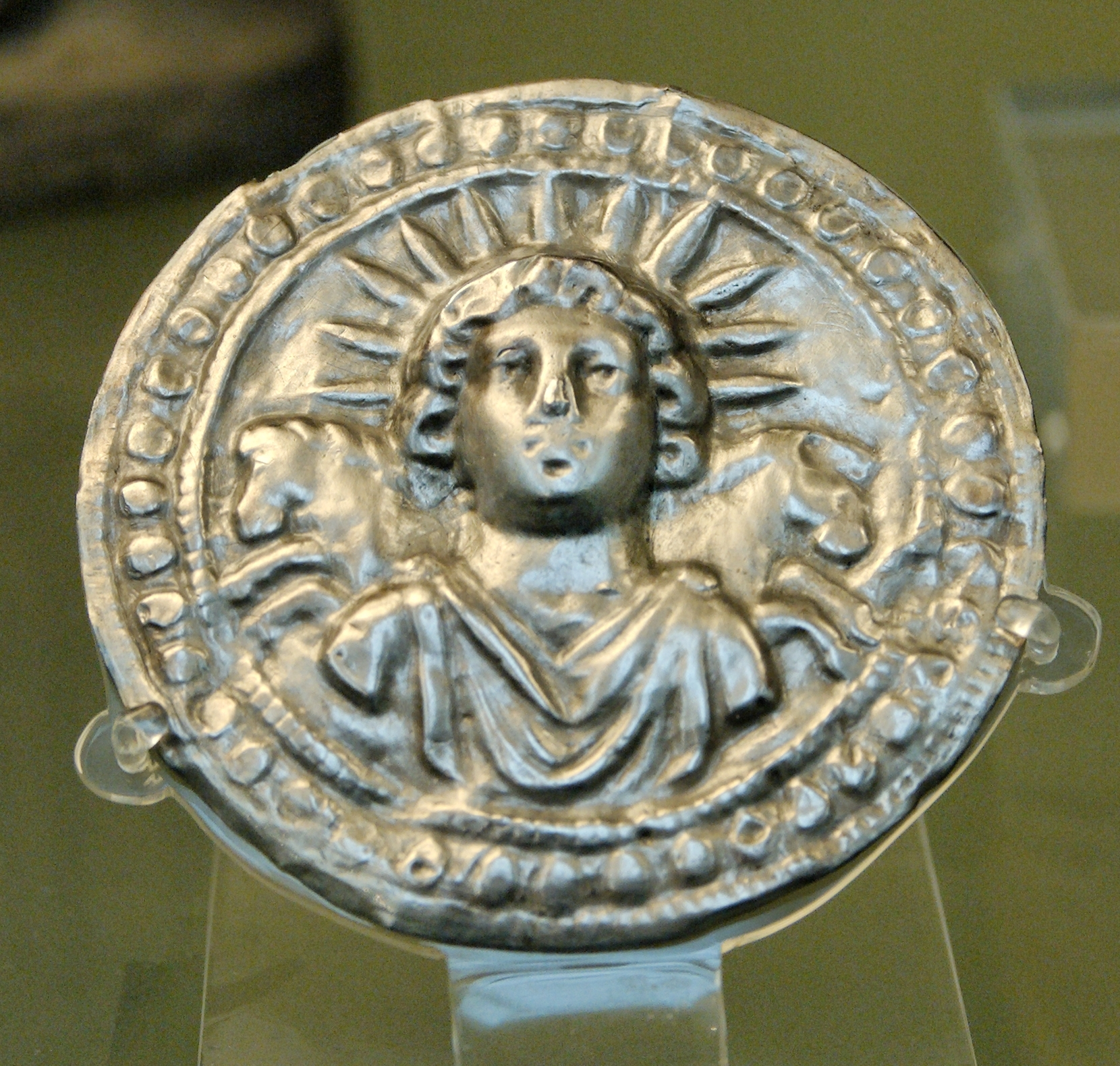
Roman Imperial repoussé silver disc of Sol Invictus (3rd century), found at Pessinus (British Museum)

The Roman gens Aurelia was associated with the cult of Sol. After his victories in the East, the Emperor Aurelian thoroughly reformed the Roman cult of Sol, elevating the sun-god to one of the premier divinities of the Empire. Where previously priests of Sol had been simply sacerdotes and tended to belong to lower ranks of Roman society, they were now pontifices and members of the new college of pontifices instituted by Aurelian. Every pontifex of Sol was a member of the senatorial elite, indicating that the priesthood of Sol was now highly prestigious. Almost all these senators held other priesthoods as well, however, and some of these other priesthoods take precedence in the inscriptions in which they are listed, suggesting that they were considered more prestigious than the priesthood of Sol. (Note: For a full list of the pontifices of Sol see J. Rupke (ed.), Fasti Sacerdotum (2005), p. 606. Memmius Vitrasius Orfitus lists his priesthoods as pontifex of Vesta, one of the quindecimviri sacris faciundis, and pontifex of Sol, in that order. In a list of eight priesthoods, Vettius Agorius Praetextatus puts Pontifex Solis in third place.) Aurelian also built a new temple for Sol, which was dedicated on 25 December 274, and brought the total number of temples for the god in Rome to (at least) four. (Note: The other three were in the Circus Maximus, on the Quirinal, and in Trastevere.) He also instituted games in honor of the sun god, held every four years from 274 onwards.

The identity of Aurelian's Sol Invictus has long been a subject of scholarly debate. Based on the Augustan History, some scholars have argued that it was based on Sol Elagablus (or Elagabla) of Emesa. Others, basing their argument on Zosimus, suggest that it was based on Malakbel, the solar god of Palmyra on the grounds that Aurelian placed and consecrated a cult statue of the sun god looted from Palmyra in the temple of Sol Invictus. Forsythe (2012) discusses these arguments and adds a third more recent one, based on the work of Steven Hijmans. Hijmans argues that Aurelian's solar deity was simply the traditional Greco-Roman Sol Invictus.

== Constantine ==
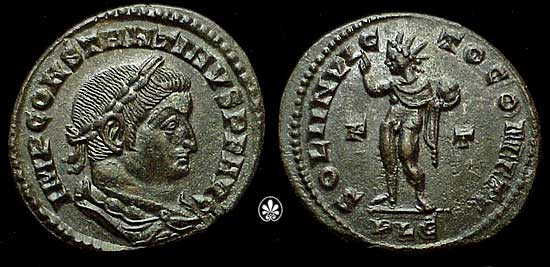
Coin of Emperor Constantine I depicting Sol Invictus with the legend SOLI INVICTO COMITI, c. 315

Emperors portrayed Sol Invictus on their official coinage, with a wide range of legends, only a few of which incorporated the epithet invictus, such as the legend SOLI INVICTO COMITI, claiming the "Unconquered Sun" as a companion to the Emperor, used with particular frequency by Constantine. (Note: A comprehensive discussion of all sol-coinage and sol-legends per emperor from Septimius Severus to Constantine can be found in Berrens (2004).) Statuettes of Sol Invictus, carried by the standard-bearers, appear in three places in reliefs on the Arch of Constantine. Constantine's official coinage continues to bear images of Sol until 325/326. A solidus of Constantine as well as a gold medallion from his reign depict the Emperor's bust in profile twinned (jugate) with Sol Invictus, with the legend INVICTUS CONSTANTINUS (Note: The medal is illustrated in Toynbee (1944); the solidus is illustrated in Maurice (n.d.))

Constantine decreed (March 7, 321) (Note: The civil edict of March 7, A.D. 321, was expressly issued by Constantine to command that "all judges and townships and all occupations of trade rest on the venerable day of the sun.") dies Solis – the day of the Sun, "Sunday" – as the Roman day of rest

On the venerable day of the Sun let the magistrates and people residing in cities rest, and let all workshops be closed. In the country however persons engaged in agriculture may freely and lawfully continue their pursuits because it often happens that another day is not suitable for grain-sowing or vine planting; lest by neglecting the proper moment for such operations the bounty of heaven should be lost.

Constantine's triumphal arch was carefully positioned to align with the colossal statue of Sol by the Colosseum, so that Sol formed the dominant backdrop when seen from the direction of the main approach towards the arch.

== Sol and later Roman Emperors ==
Berrens (2004) deals with coin-evidence of Imperial connection to the Solar cult. Sol is depicted sporadically on imperial coins in the 1st and 2nd centuries AD, then more frequently from Septimius Severus onwards until AD 325–326. Sol Invictus appears on coin legends from AD 261, well before the reign of Aurelian. (Note: The coins issued under Elagabalus do not use invictus for Roman Sol, nor for the Emesan Solar deity Elagabalus.)

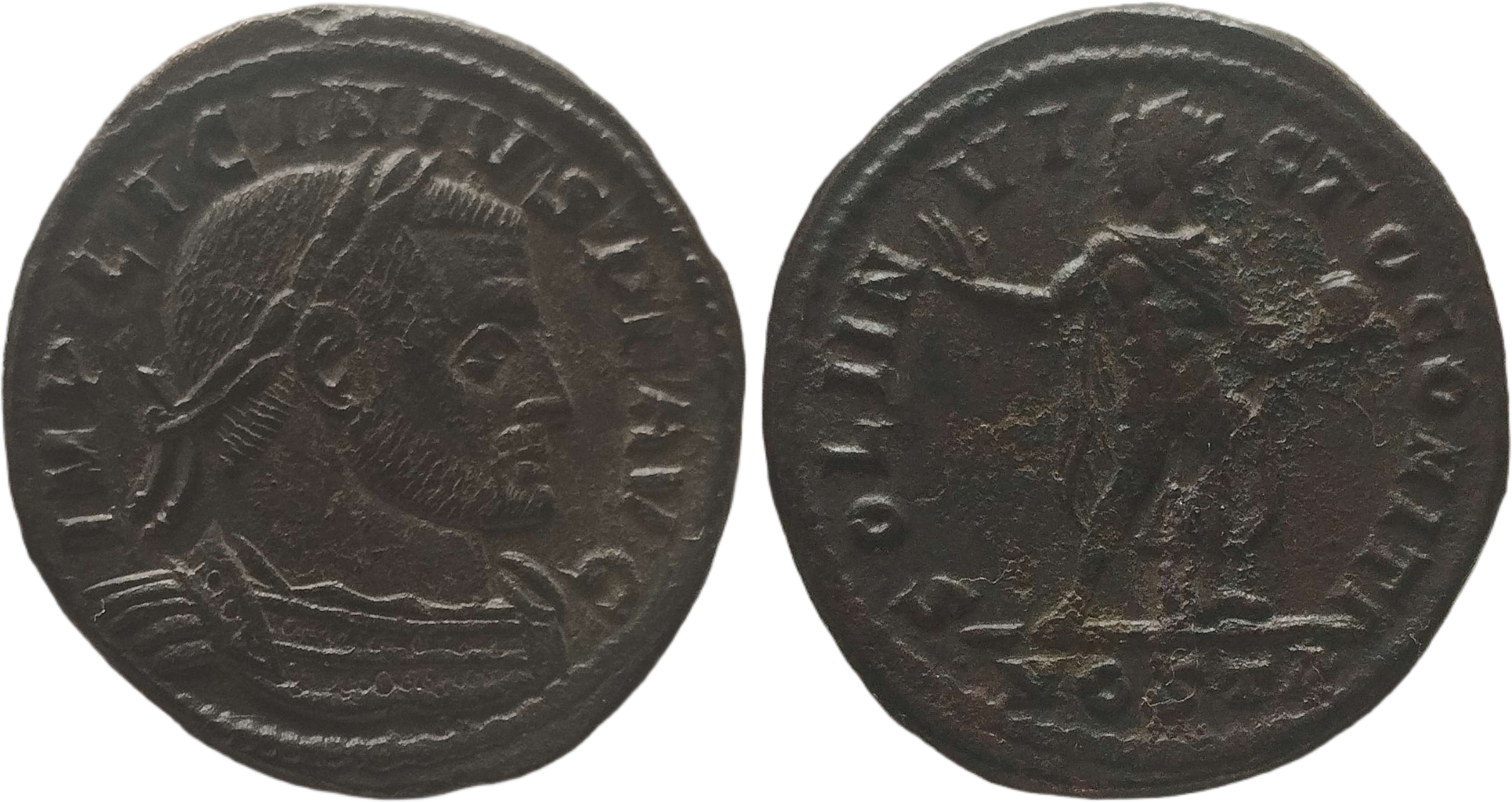
Reverse identical to the one on the coin of Constantine I but with a portrait of Licinius I on the obverse instead.

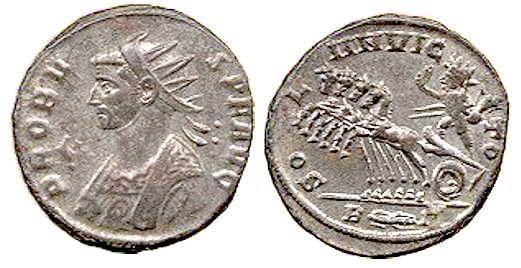
Coin of Emperor Probus, c. 280, with Sol Invictus riding a quadriga, with legend SOLI INVICTO, "to the Unconquered Sun": the Emperor (at left) wears a radiated solar crown, worn also by the god on the obverse

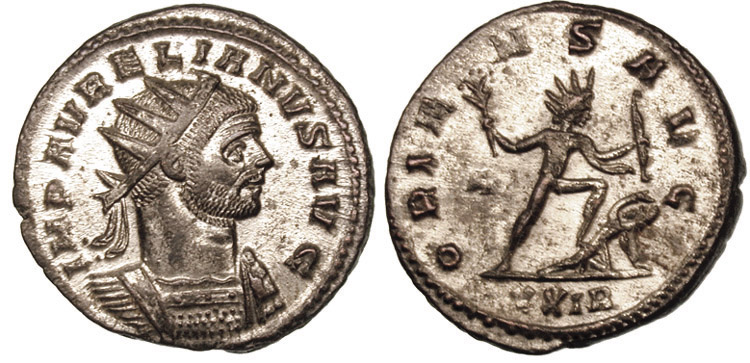
Aurelian in his radiate crown, on a silvered bronze coin struck at Rome, 274–275

Connections between the imperial radiate crown and the cult of Sol are postulated. Augustus was posthumously depicted with radiate crown, as were living emperors from Nero (after AD 65) to Constantine. Some modern scholarship interprets the imperial radiate crown as a divine, solar association rather than an overt symbol of Sol; Bergmann calls it a pseudo-object designed to disguise the divine and solar connotations that would otherwise be politically controversial but there is broad agreement that coin-images showing the imperial radiate crown are stylistically distinct from those of the solar crown of rays; the imperial radiate crown is depicted as a real object rather than as symbolic light.

Hijmans argues that the Imperial radiate crown represents the honorary wreath awarded to Augustus, perhaps posthumously, to commemorate his victory at the Battle of Actium; he points out that henceforth, living emperors were depicted with radiate crowns, but state divi were not. Hijmans believes this implies that the radiate crown of living emperors is a symbolic link to Augustus. His successors automatically inherited (or sometimes acquired) the same offices and honours due to Octavian as "saviour of the Republic" through his victory at Actium, piously attributed to Apollo-Helios.

Furthermore, radiate crowns were not solely worn by emperors: The wreaths awarded to victors at the Actian Games were radiate. (Note: Hijmans 2009, pp. 509–548. A mosaic floor in the Baths of the Porta Marina at Ostia depicts a radiate victory crown on a table as well as a victorious competitor wearing one.)

== Festival of Dies Natalis Solis Invicti ==
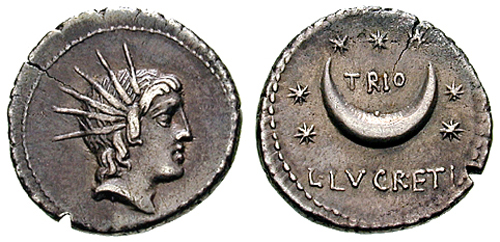
Coin depicting Sol / crescent moon and seven stars

According to some scholars, the emperor Aurelian instituted in AD 274 the festival Dies Natalis Solis Invicti ('birthday of the Invincible Sun') on 25 December, the date of the winter solstice in the Roman calendar. In Rome, this yearly festival was celebrated with thirty chariot races. Gary Forsythe, Professor of Ancient History, says "This celebration would have formed a welcome addition to the seven-day period of the Saturnalia (December 17–23), Rome's most joyous holiday season since Republican times, characterized by parties, banquets, and exchanges of gifts". Before Aurelian, the Calendar of Antiochus of Athens, c. second century AD, had marked 25 December as the "birthday of the Sun" but did not refer to any religious festival being held on that date. Around AD 238, Censorinus had written in De Die Natali that the winter solstice was the "birth of the Sun".

The festival of Natalis Invicti on December 25 is marked in the Chronograph of 354 (or Calendar of Filocalus). Historians generally agree that this part of the text was written in Rome in AD 336, and most scholars see this as referring to the Natalis Solis Invicti. Steven Hijmans questions whether this actually refers to a feast of Sol Invictus, as "Sol" is not included in the festival name, and the number of chariot races given for the feast is not a multiple of twelve unlike other feasts dedicated to him. Hijmans argues that there is no evidence for a feast dedicated to Sol Invictus at the Roman winter solstice before Julian, and doubts that the feast was actually instituted by Aurelian. Wallraff (2001) says there is limited evidence for the festival before the mid-4th century. (Note: "An inscription of unique interest from the reign of Licinius embodies the official prescription for the annual celebration by his army of a festival of Sol Invictus on December 19". The inscription actually prescribes an annual offering to Sol on November 18 (die XIV Kal(endis) Decemb(ribus), i.e., on the fourteenth day before the Kalends of December).)

Aurelian also instituted the Agon Solis (sacred contest for Sol), held every fourth year, as St Jerome's Chronicon attests. In AD 362, the emperor Julian wrote in his Hymn to King Helios that the Agon Solis was held in late December, between the end of the Saturnalia and the New Year. Julian says it is dedicated to Helios and the "Invincible Sun". Most scholars therefore date the festival to December 25 and associate it with the Natalis Solis Invicti. Dissenting from this view, Hijmans argues that Julian never said the Agon Solis was held on that date, but believes Julian celebrated a different festival of Sol at the winter solstice.

== Legacy ==
=== Christianity ===
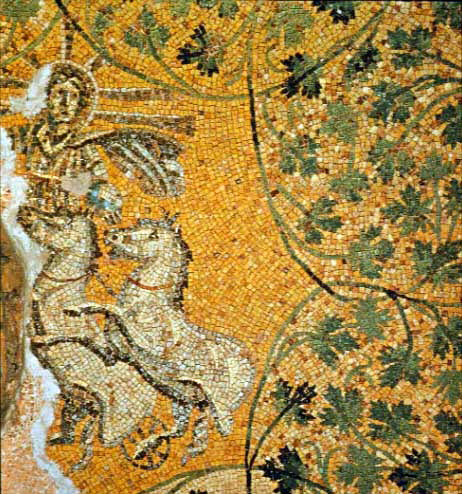
Mosaic in the Tomb of the Julii, Vatican Necropolis

A widely-held hypothesis is that the early Church chose December 25 as Jesus Christ's birthday (Dies Natalis Christi) to appropriate the festival of Sol Invictus's birthday (Dies Natalis Solis Invicti), held on the same date. The Calendar of Filocalus (c.336 AD) is the earliest record of both the Natalis Invicti and Christ's birthday being marked on December 25. Steven Hijmans argues that the earliest certain evidence for a festival of Sol Invictus on December 25 is from Julian, thirty years later; he suggests that the pagan feast might have been a reaction to the Christian one rather than vice versa.

The early Church linked Jesus Christ to the Sun and referred to him as the 'true Sun' (Sol verus), or the 'Sun of Righteousness' (Sol Justitiae) prophesied by Malachi. The Christian treatise De solstitiis et aequinoctiis, from the late fourth century AD, associates Jesus' birth with the "birthday of the sun" and Sol Invictus:

Our Lord, too, is born in the month of December ... the eighth before the calends of January [25 December] ... But they [the pagans] call it the 'birthday of the invincible one' (Invictus). But who then is as invincible as our Lord who defeated the death he suffered? Or if they say that this is the birthday of the sun, well He Himself is the Sun of Justice.

In a late fourth century Christmas sermon, Augustine of Hippo said:

Let us ... keep this day with due solemnity; not, like those who are without faith, on account of the Sun, but because of Him who made the Sun. ... He, incarnate, stands above that Sun which is worshipped as a god.

The hypothesis is mentioned in an annotation of uncertain date added to a manuscript by 12th-century Syrian bishop Jacob Bar-Salibi. The scribe wrote:

It was a custom of the Pagans to celebrate on the same 25 December the birthday of the Sun, at which they kindled lights in token of festivity. In these solemnities and revelries, the Christians also took part. Accordingly, when the doctors of the Church perceived that the Christians had a leaning to this festival, they took counsel and resolved that the true Nativity should be solemnised on that day.

Another hypothesis is that Christmas was calculated as nine months after a date chosen as Christ's conception (the Annunciation): March 25, the Roman date of the spring equinox. This hypothesis was first proposed by French priest and historian Louis Duchesne in 1889.

Imagery of Sol may have been appropriated by Christians. A mosaic dated to around 300 AD in the Tomb of the Julii, an apparently Christian tomb in the Vatican Necropolis, is generally thought to depict Jesus as Sol, Helios, or Apollo. Steven Hijmans suggests that it is simply a representation of Sol, or a figure representing the Sun.

=== Judaism ===
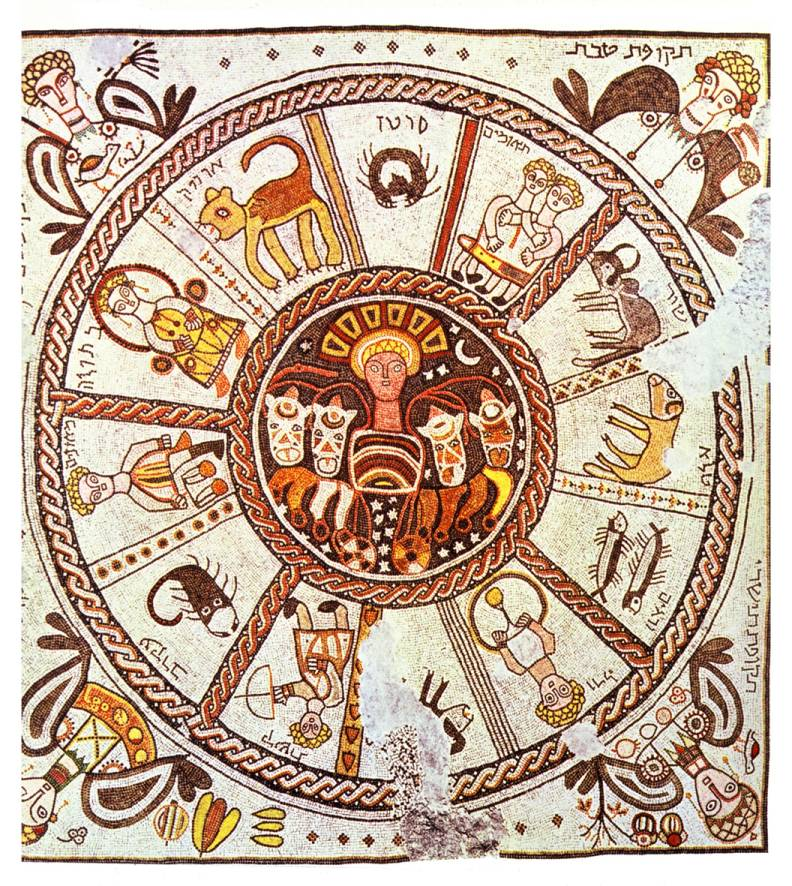
Mosaic in the Beth Alpha synagogue, with the Sun in the centre, surrounded by the twelve zodiac constellations and with the four seasons associated inaccurately with the constellations

A mosaic floor in Hamat Tiberias presents David as Helios surrounded by a ring with the signs of the zodiac. As well as in Hamat Tiberias, figures of Helios or Sol Invictus also appear in several of the very few surviving schemes of decoration surviving from Late Antique synagogues, including Beth Alpha, Husefa, all now in Israel, and Naaran in the West Bank. He is shown in floor mosaics, with the usual radiate halo, and sometimes in a quadriga, in the central roundel of a circular representation of the zodiac or the seasons. These combinations "may have represented to an agricultural Jewish community the perpetuation of the annual cycle of the universe or ... the central part of a calendar".

== See also ==
- Astrological age
- Christ myth hypothesis
- Christian views on astrology
- Christianity and paganism
- Esoteric Christianity
- Saturnalia
- Solar deity
- Victory over the Sun
- Aten
