= Pope Telesphorus =

Head of the Catholic Church from c. 126 to c. 137

Pope Saint Telesphorus
- Bishop of Rome
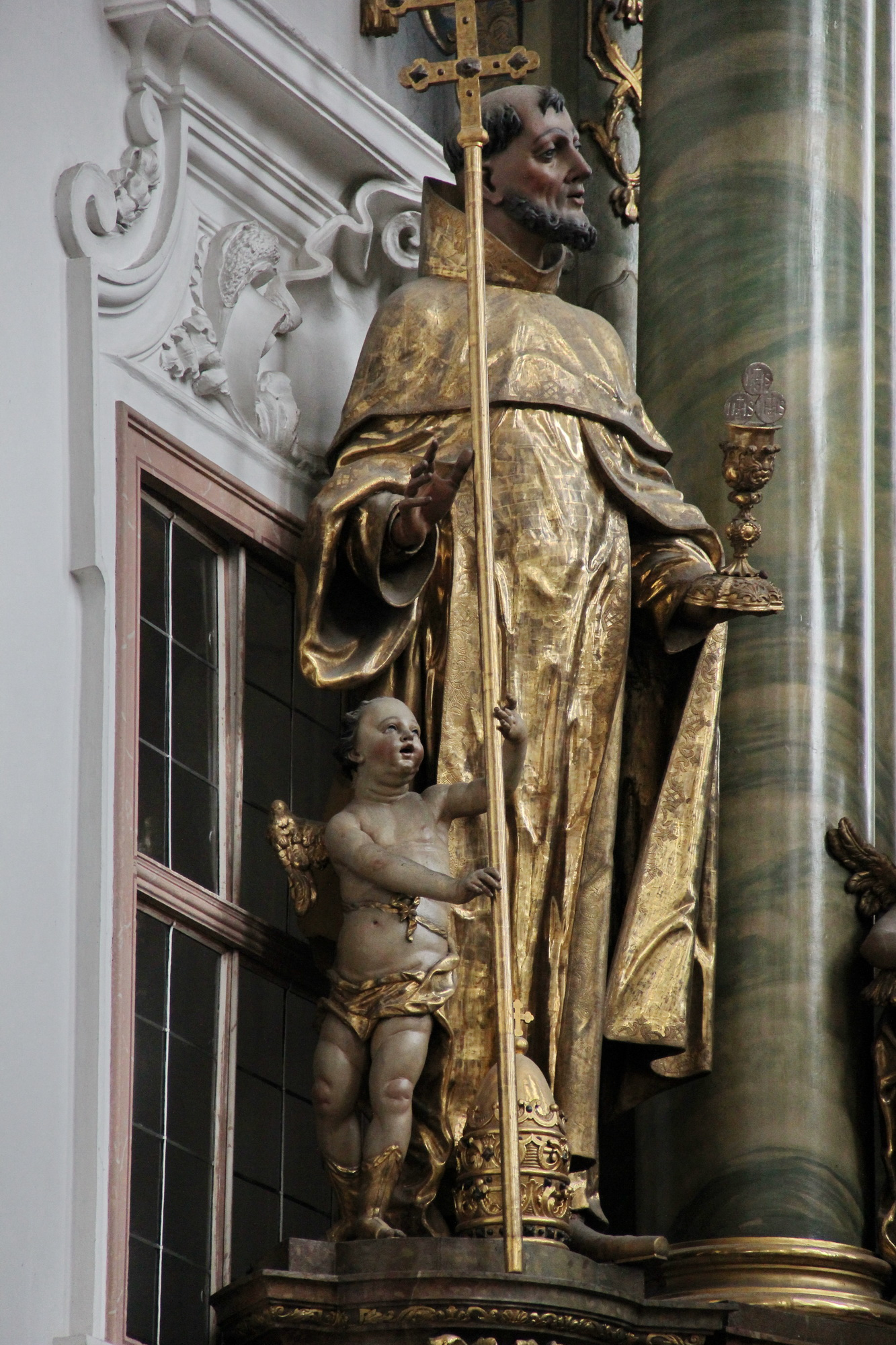
- 14th century depiction of St. Telesphorus in the Carmelite Monastery of Straubing in Bavaria
- Church: Early Church
- Papacy began: c. 126
- Papacy ended: c. 137
- Predecessor: Sixtus I
- Successor: Hyginus

Personal details
- Born: Thurii (today Terranova da Sibari, Calabria), Italy, Roman Empire
- Died: c. 137 Rome, Italy, Roman Empire

Sainthood
- Feast day: 5 January (Catholic); 5 January (Eastern Orthodox Church) and 22 February (Eastern churches)
- Venerated in: Catholic Church; Eastern Orthodox Church
- Attributes: Papal vestments
- Patronage: Carmelites

Pope Telesphorus (Greek: Τελεσφόρος; died c. 137) was the bishop of Rome from c. 126 to his death c. 137, during the reigns of Roman Emperors Hadrian and Antoninus Pius.

Telesphorus is traditionally considered the eighth Bishop of Rome in succession after Peter.

== Biography ==
Telesphorus was of Greek ancestry and born in Thurii (today Terranova da Sibari, Calabria), Italy. The Liber Pontificalis mentions that he had been an anchorite (or hermit) monk prior to assuming office.

Eusebius (Church History iv.7; iv.14) places the beginning of his pontificate in the twelfth year of the reign of Emperor Hadrian (128–129) and gives the date of his death as being in the first year of the reign of Antoninus Pius (138–139).

As the capital of the empire was a place that allowed a wide spread of ideas, many heretics moved to Rome during his pontificate. During this period, the main heretical doctrine was Gnosticism, which Telesphorus vigorously fought because he believed it could steer religion towards a mysticism far removed from reality. The main exponent of this doctrine was the philosopher Valentinus, who at this time moved from Egypt to Rome and also managed to have a large number of followers in the capital of the empire for more than twenty years.

A fragment of a letter from Irenæus to Pope Victor I during the Easter controversy in the late 2nd century, also preserved by Eusebius, testifies that Telesphorus was one of the Roman bishops who always celebrated Easter on Sunday, rather than on other days of the week according to the calculation of the Jewish Passover. Unlike Victor, however, Telesphorus remained in communion with those communities that did not follow this custom.

The tradition of Christmas Midnight Masses, the celebration of Easter on Sundays, the keeping of a seven-week Lent before Easter and the singing of the Gloria are usually attributed to his pontificate; however, historian Johann Peter Kirsch says that "[n]one of the statements in the "Liber pontificalis" and other authorities of a later date as to liturgical and other decisions of this pope are genuine."

According to the testimony of Irenaeus (Against Heresies III.3.3), he suffered martyrdom. Although most early popes are called martyrs by sources such as the Liber Pontificalis (dating to the 3rd century at earliest), Telesphorus is the first to whom Irenaeus, writing considerably earlier (c. 180 AD), gives this title, thus making his martyrdom the earliest attested martyrdom of a pope after Peter. He was buried in the Vatican Necropolis, next to his predecessors.

In Roman Martyrology, his feast is celebrated on 2 January; the Eastern churches celebrate it on 22 February.

== Patronage ==
Until the 17th century, the Carmelites venerated Telesphorus as a patron saint of the order since some sources depict him living as a hermit. He is depicted in a stained glass window at the Carmelite monastery in Boxmeer.

The town of Saint-Télesphore, in the southwestern part of Canada's Quebec province, is named after him.

== See also ==
- List of popes

Catholic Church titles
Preceded by Sixtus I	Bishop of Rome; Pope; 126–137	Succeeded by Hyginus
