= Terranova da Sibari =

- Comune
- Comune di Terranova da Sibari
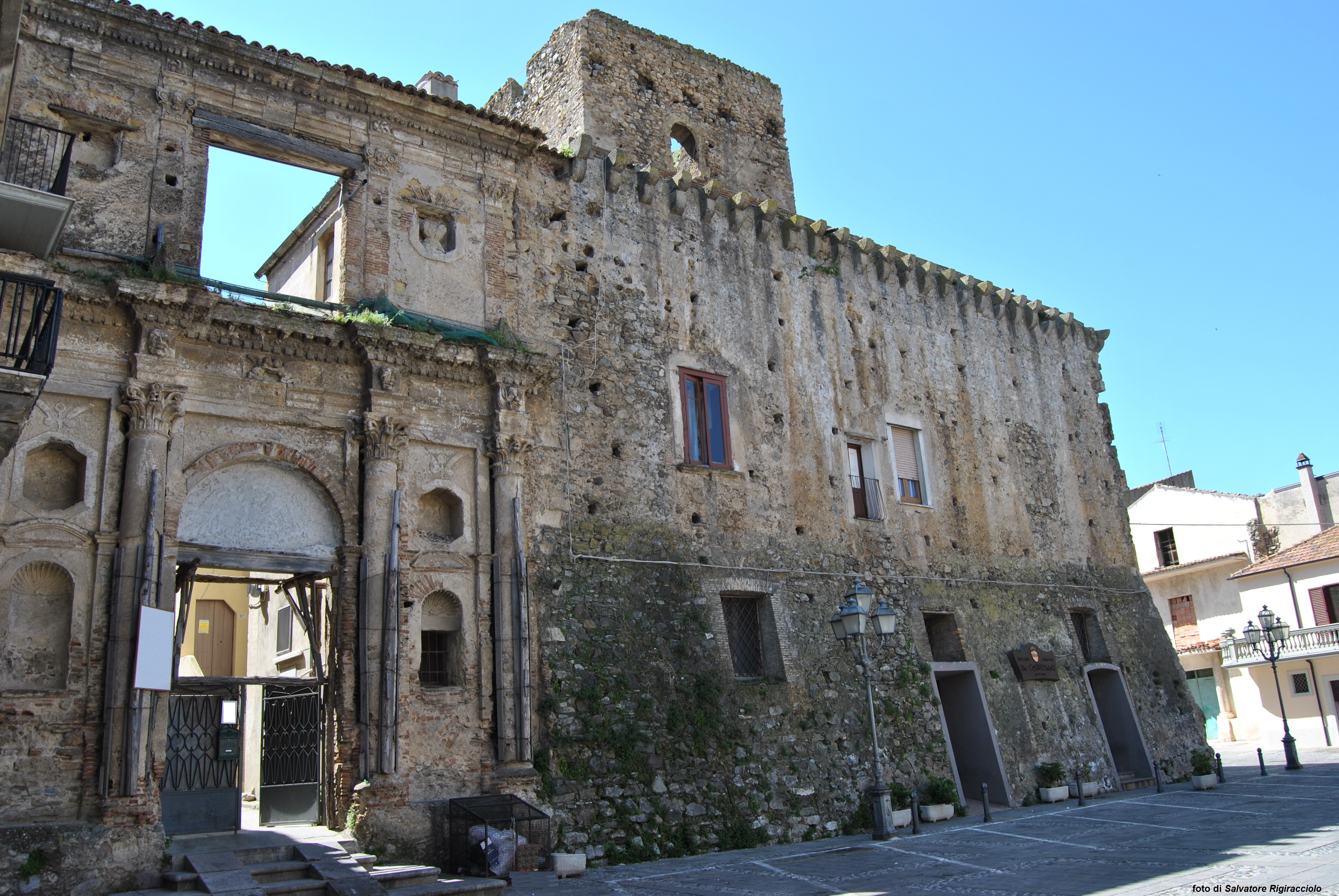
- Feudal castle.

- Coat of arms

- Location within Italy Location within Calabria
- Coordinates: 39°39′N 16°20′E
- Country: Italy
- Region: Calabria
- Province: Cosenza (CS)

Government
  - Mayor: Luigi Lirangi

Area
  - Total: 43.06 km^{2} (16.63 sq mi)
- Elevation: 313 m (1,027 ft)

Population (31 December 2013)
  - Total: 5,180
  - Density: 120/km^{2} (312/sq mi)
- Demonym: Terranovesi
- Time zone: UTC+1 (CET)
  - Summer (DST): UTC+2 (CEST)
- Postal code: 87010
- Dialing code: 0981
- Patron saint: St. Francis
- Saint day: Second Sunday in May
- Website: Official website

Terranova da Sibari (Calabrian: Terranova di Sibbari) is a town and comune in the province of Cosenza in the Calabria region of southern Italy. It is located on a hill between the river Crati and the last stretches of the Sila Mountains, at some 20 kilometres (12 miles) from the Ionian Sea. Refugees from the ancient city of Thurii founded Terranova after the destruction of their city in the war against Croton.

Once known as Terranova del Vallo and Terranova di Calabria Citra, it received the current name after the unification of Italy, referring to the ancient cities of Thurii and Sybaris.

The main attractions include the feudal castle, the Torre Acquanova fountain and six medieval-Baroque churches.

== International relations ==
Terranova da Sibari is twinned with:

- Avellaneda, Argentina

== Notable people ==
- Pope Telesphorus (2nd century Pope)
- Pope Dionysius (3rd century Pope)
