= Discourse to the Greeks concerning Hades =

Short Christian treatise

The Discourse to the Greeks concerning Hades, also called Against Plato on the Cause of the Universe, is a short treatise believed to be the work of Hippolytus of Rome. It was erroneously attributed to the Jewish historian Josephus since at least the 9th century and was first published in a translation of Josephus' works by William Whiston. As Whiston's translation is in the public domain, it appears in many present-day English editions of Josephus' work without any noting of its erroneous attribution.

== Synopsis ==
This work describes the author's views on the afterlife against the prevailing view of the "Greeks" (i.e., the Greco-Romans) of his day. He asserts that:

...Hades is a place in the world not regularly finished; a subterraneous region, wherein the light of this world does not shine; from which circumstance, that in this region the light does not shine, it cannot be but there must be in it perpetual darkness. This region is allotted as a place of custody for souls, in which angels are appointed as guardians to them, who distribute to them temporary punishments, agreeable to every one's behavior and manners.

The author describes Hades as having "a lake of unquenchable fire" prepared by God for a future date of judgment. However, both the just and unjust dead are confined in other, separate portions of Hades; all go through a gate guarded by "an archangel with an host", with the just being guided to the right hand toward a region of light called the Bosom of Abraham. The unjust are violently forced toward the left hand by angels, to a place characterized by fire and which emits "hot vapor", from which they can see the just but cannot pass over due to a "chaos deep and large" that serves as a barrier.

The author assures the Greeks he is addressing that God will resurrect the dead, raising again their bodies and not transmigrating their souls to different bodies. He insists that God is able to do this, likening the dead body both to sown seed and to material cast into "a potter's furnace, in order to be formed again". The author says that when clothed with their pure resurrected bodies, the just will no longer be subject to disease or misery. The unjust, in contrast, will receive their bodies unchanged, including their original diseases. All (just and unjust) will be brought before Jesus Christ who will come as judge; the author specifically dismisses Minos and Rhadamanthus, those whom the Greeks believed were judges of the underworld, as the arbiters of mankind's fate. Instead, Christ will exercise "the righteous judgment of the Father towards all men", with everlasting punishment for the wicked and eternal bliss for the righteous. The author exhorts his audience to believe in God in order to participate in the reward of the just.

The final paragraph quotes an alleged saying of Christ, "In whatsoever ways I shall find you, in them shall I judge you entirely", which the author uses to claim that if a person living a virtuous life falls into sin, his virtue will not help him escape punishment, while a wicked person who repents in time may still recover "as from a distemper".

== Biblical references ==
There are many references to the New Testament throughout the "Discourse". For example, the division of the just and unjust to the right and left suggests Matthew 25:32–33; the reference to the Bosom of Abraham and the "chaos" clearly are related to the story of the rich man and Lazarus (Luke 16:19–31); the comparison of the body to seed that has been planted recalls 1 Corinthians 15:37–38; and the committing of all judgment to Christ comes from John 5:22. Several of these references are mentioned by William Whiston in his dissertation attempting to prove Josephus was the author.

== Authorship ==
William Whiston in "Dissertation 6", part of the appendix to his Josephus translation, printed the text of this "Discourse" in Greek and maintained that the piece was by Josephus, "preached or written when he was bishop of Jerusalem".

Although generally still reprinted in editions of Whiston's Josephus, later scholars have realized that this attribution is incorrect. This brief discourse, at least in its original form, is now attributed to the church father Hippolytus. The attribution to Josephus, recorded by Photius in his Bibliotheca, did not stand unchallenged even in antiquity, and the "Discourse" was also ascribed to Caius, Presbyter of Rome, Justin Martyr, and Irenaeus.

We now know that a work by Hippolytus published in Vol. 5 of the Ante-Nicene Fathers under the title "Against Plato, on the Cause of the Universe" is essentially the same work as the "Discourse" attributed to Josephus. This Hippolytus work is in fact a fragment from a longer treatise entitled "Against the Greeks." There are, however, some slight differences between the Hippolytus version and the one that has passed under Josephus' name, notably in the final "Josephus" paragraph. This includes the "In whatsoever ways I shall find you" quote mentioned above, which is not in Hippolytus' fragment as given in the Ante-Nicene Fathers but does appear in Justin Martyr's Dialogue with Trypho (chapter 47), where it is also attributed to Jesus.

== See also ==
- Josephus on Jesus
