= Pope Hyginus =

Head of the Catholic Church from c. 138 to c. 142

Pope Saint Hyginus
- Bishop of Rome
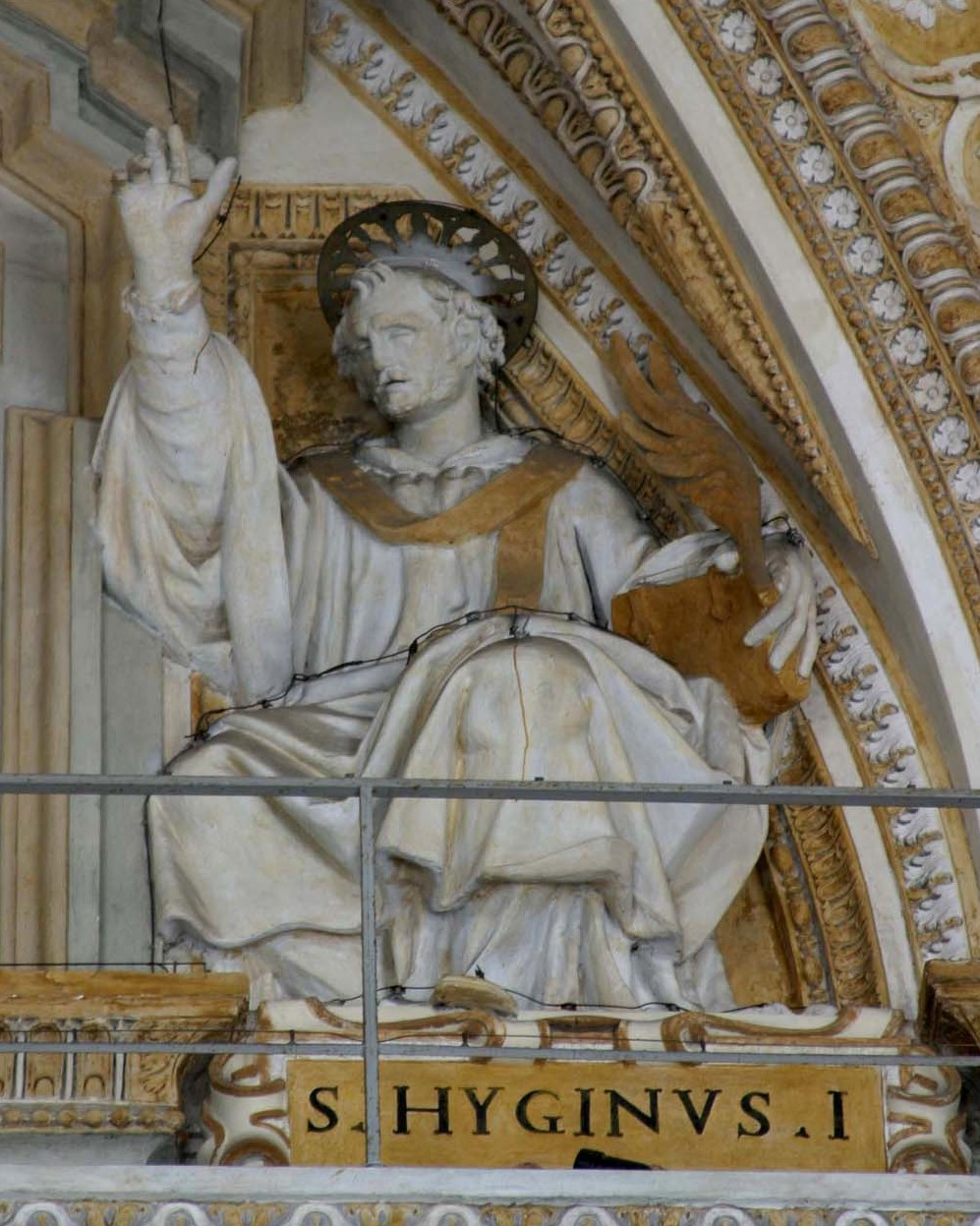
- Statue of Pope Hyginus in St. Peter's Basilica
- Church: Catholic Church
- Papacy began: c. 138
- Papacy ended: c. 142
- Predecessor: Telesphorus
- Successor: Pius I

Personal details
- Born: Athens, Achaia (Greece), Roman Empire
- Died: 142 Rome, Italy, Roman Empire

Sainthood
- Feast day: 11 January

Pope Hyginus (Greek: Υγίνος) was the bishop of Rome from c. 138 to his death in c. 142. Tradition holds that during his papacy he determined the various prerogatives of the clergy and defined the grades of the ecclesiastical hierarchy.

Hyginus instituted baptismal parents at baptism to assist the baptised during their Christian life. He also decreed that all churches be consecrated. He is said to have died a martyr, though no records verify this. The chronology of the early bishops of Rome cannot be determined with any degree of exactitude today.

== History ==
According to the Liber Pontificalis, Hyginus was a Greek by birth. Irenaeus says that the gnostic Valentinus came to Rome in Hyginus' time, remaining there until Anicetus became pontiff.

Cerdo, another Gnostic and predecessor of Marcion of Sinope, also lived at Rome in the reign of Hyginus; by confessing his errors and recanting, he succeeded in obtaining readmission into the Church but eventually fell back into heresy and was expelled from the Church. The Liber Pontificalis also relates that this pope organized the hierarchy and established the order of ecclesiastical precedence (Hic clerum composuit et distribuit gradus). This general observation recurs also in the biography of Pope Hormisdas. According to Louis Duchesne, the writer probably referred to the lower orders of the clergy.

The ancient sources contain no information as to his having died a martyr. At his death he was buried on the Vatican Hill, near Saint Peter's tomb. His feast is celebrated on 11 January.

His feast day in the Eastern Orthodox Church is also 11 January.

== See also ==
- List of popes

Catholic Church titles
Preceded by Telesphorus	Bishop of Rome; Pope; 136–142	Succeeded by Pius I
