= Pope Alexander I =

Head of the Catholic Church from c. 107 to c. 115

Pope Saint Alexander I
- Bishop of Rome
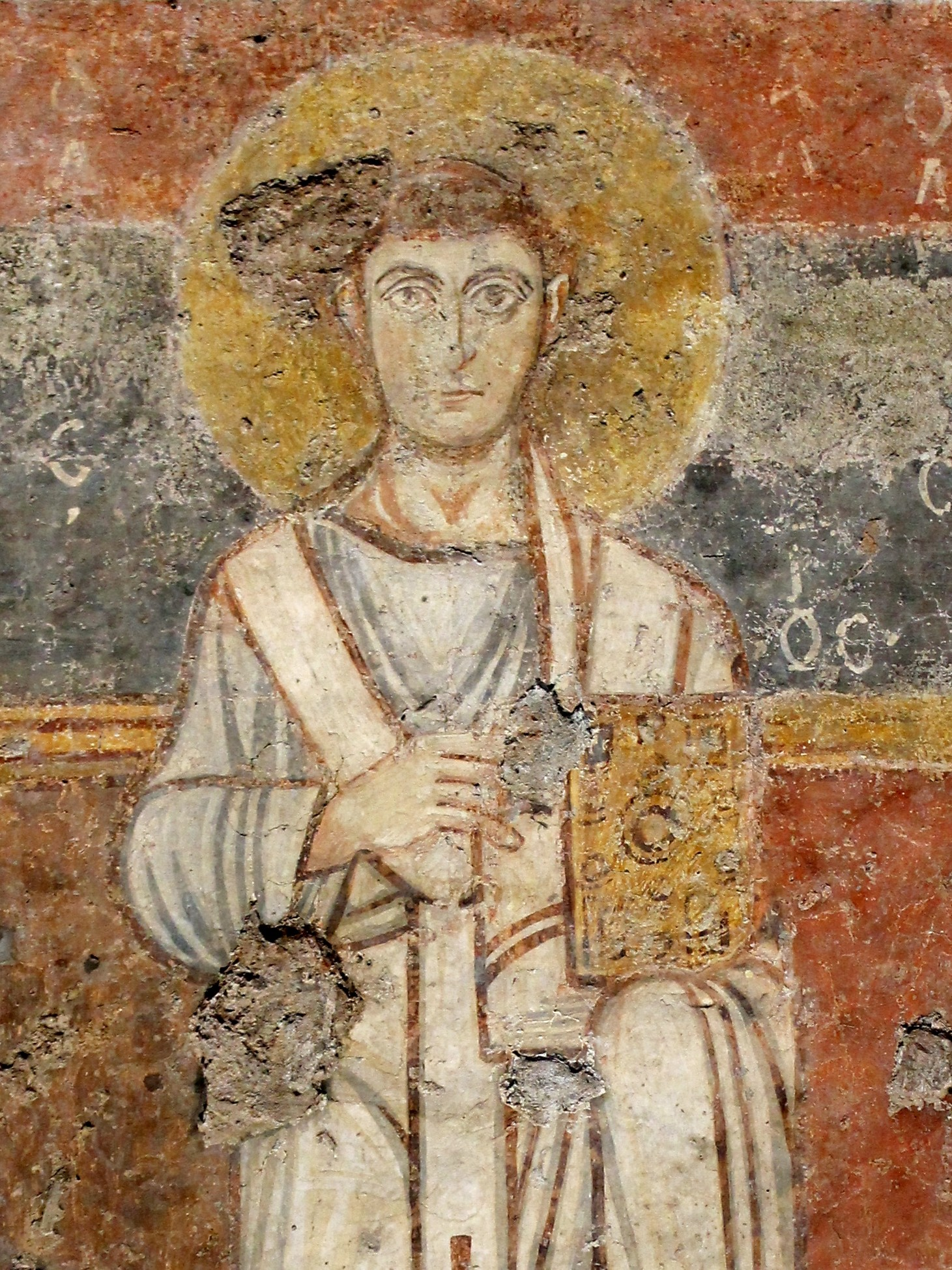
- 8th-century fresco of Pope Alexander I from Santa Maria Antiqua
- Church: Early Church
- Papacy began: c. 109
- Papacy ended: c. 119
- Predecessor: Evaristus
- Successor: Sixtus I

Personal details
- Born: Rome, Italia, Roman Empire
- Died: c. 119 Rome, Italia, Roman Empire

Sainthood
- Feast day: 16 March (Greek Christianity); 3 May (Tridentine calendar)
- Venerated in: Eastern Orthodox Church; Roman Catholic Church; Lutheran Church

Pope Alexander I (Greek: Αλέξανδρος, died c. 115) was the bishop of Rome from about 108/09 to 116/19 (according to the 2012 Annuario Pontificio). Some believe he suffered martyrdom under the Roman emperor Trajan or Hadrian.

== Life and legend ==
According to the Liber Pontificalis, it was Alexander I who inserted the narration of the Last Supper (the Qui pridie) into the liturgy of the Mass. However, the article on Saint Alexander I in the 1907 Catholic Encyclopedia, written by Thomas Shahan, judges this tradition to be inaccurate, a view shared by Roman Catholic and non-Roman Catholic experts alike. It is viewed as a product of the agenda of Liber Pontificalis—this section of the book was probably written in the late 5th century—to show an ancient pattern of the earliest bishops of Rome ruling the church by papal decree. The chronology of his pontificate is disputed, but he probably assumed office around 108/109 AD and died around 118/119 AD, after a tenure of 10 years.

The introduction of the customs of using blessed water mixed with salt for the purification of Christian homes from evil influences, as well as that of mixing water with the sacramental wine, are attributed to Pope Alexander I. Some sources consider these attributions unlikely. It is certainly possible, however, that Alexander played an important part in the early development of the Church of Rome's emerging liturgical and administrative traditions.

A later tradition holds that in the reign of the emperor Hadrian, Alexander I converted the Roman governor Hermes by miraculous means, together with his entire household of 1,500 people. Quirinus of Neuss, who was Alexander's supposed jailer, and Quirinus' daughter Balbina of Rome were also among his converts.

Alexander is said to have seen a vision of the infant Jesus. His remains are said to have been transferred to Freising in Bavaria, Germany in AD 834.

== Supposed identification with a martyr ==
Some editions of the Roman Missal identified Pope Alexander I with the Alexander that they give as commemorated, together with Eventius and Theodulus (who were supposed to be priests of his), on 3 May. See, for instance, the General Roman Calendar of 1954. But nothing is known of these three saints other than their names, together with the fact that they were martyred and were buried at the seventh milestone of the Via Nomentana on 3 May of some year. For this reason, the Pope John XXIII's 1960 revision of the calendar returned to the presentation that was in the 1570 Tridentine calendar of the three saints as simply "Saints Alexander, Eventius and Theodulus Martyrs" with no suggestion that any of them was a pope. The Roman Martyrology lists them as Eventius, Alexander and Theodulus, the order in which their names are given in historical documents.

== See also ==
- List of Catholic saints
- List of popes

Catholic Church titles
Preceded by Evaristus	Bishop of Rome; Pope; 106–115	Succeeded by Sixtus I
