= Caius (presbyter) =

3rd-century Christian author

Caius, Presbyter of Rome (also known as Gaius) was a Christian author who lived and wrote towards the beginning of the 3rd century. Only fragments of his works are known, which are given in the collection entitled The Ante-Nicene Fathers. However, the Muratorian fragment, an early attempt to establish the canon of the New Testament, is often attributed to Caius and is included in that collection.

Caius was noted for his role in theological debates within the early Christian church. He is described by Eusebius as a presbyter of the Roman church, though this is inferred rather than explicitly stated. His most notable contribution is a dialogue purported to be held in Rome during the episcopate of Zephyrinus (AD 201-219), where he debates Proclus, a leader of the Montanists, about the legitimacy of Montanist prophecy.

For the existing fragments from Caius' "Dialogue or Disputation Against Proclus," we are indebted to Eusebius, who included them in his Ecclesiastical History. In one of these fragments, Caius tells Proclus,

"And I can show the trophies of the apostles. For if you choose to go to the Vatican or to the Ostian Road, you will find the trophies of those who founded this church."

This is described by the Catholic Encyclopedia as "a very valuable evidence of the death of Sts. Peter and Paul at Rome, and the public veneration of their remains at Rome about the year 200."

There is also another series of fragments Eusebius gives from a work called "Against the Heresy of Artemon," although the Ante-Nicene Fathers note says regarding the authorship only that it is "an anonymous work ascribed by some to Caius."

Caius was also one of the authors to whom the "Discourse to the Greeks concerning Hades" was ascribed at one time. (It was also attributed, much more famously, to Josephus and still appears in editions of the William Whiston translation of his collected works, but is now known to be excerpted from a work by Hippolytus of Rome.)

== See also ==
- Santa Susanna
