= Pope Sixtus I =

Head of the Catholic Church from c. 115 to c. 124

Pope Saint Sixtus I
- Bishop of Rome
- Church: Early Church
- Papacy began: c. 115/119
- Papacy ended: c. 125/128
- Predecessor: Alexander I
- Successor: Telesphorus

Personal details
- Born: 42 Rome, Italy, Roman Empire
- Died: 125 (aged c. 82 – 83) Rome, Italy, Roman Empire

Sainthood
- Feast day: 6 April
- Venerated in: Catholic Church
- Title as Saint: Martyr

Pope Sixtus I (Greek: Σίξτος), also spelled Xystus, a Roman of Greek descent, was the bishop of Rome from c. 117 or 119 to his death c. 126 or 128. He succeeded Alexander I and was in turn succeeded by Telesphorus. His feast is celebrated on 6 April.

== Name ==
Older sources use the spelling Xystus (from the Greek ξυστός, xystos, "polished", "correct", "shaved") in reference to the first three popes of that name. Pope Sixtus I was also the sixth Pope after Peter, leading to questions as to whether the name "Sixtus" is derived from sextus, Latin for "sixth".

The "Xystus" mentioned in the Catholic Canon of the Mass is Xystus II, not Xystus I.

== Biography ==
Some authorities agree that he reigned about ten years. According to the Liberian Catalogue of popes, he served the Church during the reign of Hadrian "from the consulate of Niger and Apronianus until that of Verus III and Ambibulus", that is, from 117 to 126. Eusebius states in his Historia Ecclesiastica that Sixtus I reigned from 119 to 128, which is repeated in the Latin translation of his Chronicon. However, the Armenian translation dates Telesphorus’ accession to 124. Eusebius himself begins to show internal inconsistencies for the chronology of this period; Richard Adelbert Lipsius compares the available sources and asserts that Sixtus died between around 125, after a tenure of 10 years. Like most of his predecessors, Sixtus I was believed to have been buried near Peter's grave on Vatican Hill, although there are differing traditions concerning where his body lies today. In Alife, there is a Romanesque crypt, which houses the relics of Pope Sixtus I, brought there by Rainulf III. Alban Butler (Lives of the Saints, 6 April) states that Clement X gave some of his relics to Cardinal de Retz, who placed them in the Abbey of Saint Michael in Lorraine.

=== Liturgical codification ===
Sixtus I instituted several Catholic liturgical and administrative traditions. According to the Liber Pontificalis (ed. Duchesne, I.128), he passed the following three ordinances:

- that none but sacred ministers are allowed to touch the sacred vessels;
- that bishops who have been summoned to the Holy See shall, upon their return, not be received by their diocese except on presenting Apostolic letters;
- that after the Preface in the Mass, the priest shall recite the Sanctus with the people.

== See also ==
- List of Catholic saints
- List of popes
- Pope Saint Sixtus I, patron saint archive

== Bibliography ==
- Benedict XVI. The Roman Martyrology. Gardners Books, 2007. ISBN 978-0-548-13374-3.
- Chapman, John. Studies on the Early Papacy. Port Washington, NY: Kennikat Press, 1971. ISBN 978-0-8046-1139-8.
- Fortescue, Adrian, and Scott M. P. Reid. The Early Papacy: To the Synod of Chalcedon in 451. Southampton: Saint Austin Press, 1997. ISBN 978-1-901157-60-4.
- Jowett, George F. The Drama of the Lost Disciples. London: Covenant Pub. Co, 1968. OCLC 7181392
- Loomis, Louise Ropes. The Book of Popes (Liber Pontificalis). Merchantville, NJ: Evolution Publishing. ISBN 1-889758-86-8.
- This article incorporates text from a publication now in the public domain: Herbermann, Charles, ed. (1913). "Pope St. Sixtus I". Catholic Encyclopedia. New York: Robert Appleton Company.

Catholic Church titles
Preceded by Alexander I	Bishop of Rome; 115–125	Succeeded by Telesphorus
