= Vatican Necropolis =

Part of Vatican City

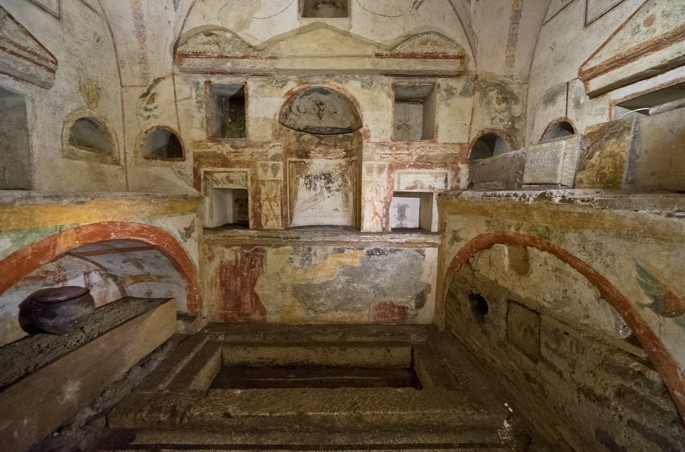
- An ancient Roman tomb near the supposed tomb of St. Peter.
- Click on the map for a fullscreen view

General information
- Location: Vatican City
- Coordinates: 41°54′08″N 12°27′12″E

The Vatican Necropolis is a necropolis that lies underneath Vatican City containing tombs dating from the first to fourth century AD, at depths varying between 5 and 12 metres (16 and 39 ft) below Saint Peter's Basilica. The Vatican sponsored archaeological excavations (also known by their Italian name scavi) under Saint Peter's in the years 1940–1949, which revealed parts of a necropolis dating to the Roman Empire. It is the home to the Tomb of the Julii, which has been dated to the third or fourth century. The necropolis was not originally one of the Catacombs of Rome, but an open-air cemetery with tombs and mausolea.

The Vatican Necropolis is not to be confused with the Vatican Grottoes, the latter of which resulted from the construction of St Peter's Church and is located on the ground level of the old Constantinian basilica.

== Origins of the necropolis ==
The Vatican necropolis was originally a burial ground built on the southern slope of Vatican Hill, adjacent to the Circus of Caligula. In accordance with the Roman law, it was forbidden to bury the dead within the city walls. For this reason, burial grounds sprang up along the roads outside of the city cemeteries. One of these streets, the Via Cornelia, ran north along Vatican Hill.

=== Caligula's Circus ===
At the top of the circus that Caligula built is an Egyptian obelisk that had been placed there in ancient times. In 1586, it was moved from its original place by Domenico Fontana on the orders of Pope Sixtus V when St. Peter's Square was added.

The original location was just in front of the present-day Excavation Office (Ufficio Scavi) of the Fabbrica di San Pietro and is marked by a plaque in the ground.

=== Construction of Old St. Peter's ===
According to tradition, the Apostle Peter was martyred in the year 64 or 67 during the reign of Emperor Nero. Peter is said to be buried in the necropolis because of its proximity to the Circus of Nero where he was martyred. After the Edict of Milan, the Emperor Constantine the Great began construction of the first St. Peter's Church, also known as Old St. Peter's Basilica. At this time, the Roman necropolis was still in use. This is known because a coin was found inside an urn dating from 318 AD. During this time, the necropolis was protected by law and was untouchable. However, Emperor Constantine decided to build a basilica, which would be located just above the supposed grave of the Apostle Peter. To obtain the necessary amount of flat area for the planned construction, Emperor Constantine excavated part of the necropolis of Vatican Hill. This caused the necropolis to be filled with soil and building debris, with the exception of St. Peter's tomb, which was preserved.

== Excavations ==
=== 20th century ===
The first modern excavations of the Necropolis occurred from 1940 to 1949, during the pontificate of Pope Pius XII. The purpose of these excavations was to locate the grave of St. Peter, which for centuries had been assumed to be beneath St. Peter's Basilica.

A series of mausoleums were unearthed during the excavations. The mausoleums were initially labeled with the Greek alphabet letters Φ (phi), Χ (chi) and Ψ (Psi). Later, Latin letters were used. Mausoleum M had already been described in 1574, and Mausoleum O was discovered when it was unearthed during the construction of the foundation for the statue of Pope Pius VI. Mausoleums R and S were discovered when the southern part of the foundation for the canopy of Gian Lorenzo Bernini was created.

Mausoleum A is the first structure to be built on the site. In later years, in rapid succession, the mausoleums B, C, D and E were built next to each other. Mausoleum G is very likely from the same time as Mausoleum B, while Mausoleum F was probably created during the reign of Emperor Antoninus Pius (138–161 AD). These seven mausoleums were placed in a row, built as standalone buildings with different heights, and forming an approximately 32-metre (105 ft) long road.

In later times, the gap was filled by Mausoleums G and O and with other buildings. In the reign of Emperor Hadrian (117–138 AD), Mausoleum O was built. Only Mausoleum H, from the second half of the 2nd century, deviates from the straight row because of a pre-existing atrium. By this time the Circus was no longer in use; thus, it was no longer an obstacle to the spread of the necropolis to the south. The Circus at the time was already overbuilt with various tombs. A grave from the same time as the construction of Mausoleum H was found near the foundation of the obelisk. When the Circus was eventually razed, to the already existing series of mausoleums was built another group, namely the Mausoleums Z, Φ (phi), Χ (chi) and Ψ (Psi. In the period from the end of the 2nd century to the middle of the 3rd century, mausoleums were built along with various freestanding buildings. All buildings except Mausoleum R1 had their entrance to the south, in the direction of the Circus and the Via Cornelia.

The mausoleums had been used by many generations and shared by several families. Archaeologists found around 120 burials in Mausoleum F, and at least 170 in Mausoleum H. An approximate calculation of the number of body and urn burials in the 22 excavated tombs yielded a number of more than 1,000 funerals. This large number is due to the high infant mortality and low life expectancy in the 2nd century.

The former owners of six mausoleums (A, C, H, L, N, and O) have been identified from inscriptions above the entrance door. Mausoleum N is an example of a mausoleum that was used by different families at the same time. The inscription reports that it is the mausoleum of Marcus Aebutius Charito, but that one half belongs to Lucius Volusius Successus and Volusia Megiste, who jointly purchased some of it.

=== 21st century ===
More of the necropolis was unearthed in 2003 during construction of a car park. The site is now open to visitors.

Some tombs have undergone restorations, such as the ten-month project involving the Valerii Mausoleum.

=== St. Peter's Grave (Field P) ===
The field named P (Peter Campus) is the small area in which the suspected grave of the Apostle Peter is located. Peter was, according to tradition, buried here after his martyrdom in the Circus of Nero. Some 100 years after the death of Peter, a shrine was erected over his grave. This shrine is adjacent to the so-called Red Wall. Immediately adjacent to the suspected tomb of Peter, other tombs were found. The arrangement of the graves suggests that the place of Peter's tomb was the site of some early veneration. The shrine, also called the "Trophy of Gaius", is named for the theologian Gaius of Rome, who lived in Rome during the time of Pope Zephyrinus (198–217 AD). Consider this quote from Eusebius of Caesarea:

I can show the tropaia of the apostles. Because if you want to go to the Vatican or on the road to Ostia, you'll find the tropaia of those who founded this church.

The Greek term used by Gaius—tropaion—usually refers to a monument or a trophy of victory. Eusebius interpreted the quote 100 years later as an indication of honorific graves. On the right side of the "Trophy of Gaius" is attached at right angles, the so-called Graffiti Wall, named after the large number of Latin graffiti to be found there. During the excavations in the grave the mortal remains of the Apostle Peter were not found. There were, however, in a marble-lined hole of the graffiti wall, some human bones. The archaeologist Margherita Guarducci suggested that during the time of construction of the Constantinian basilica, the remains of the Apostle Peter were removed from his original grave and placed in the opening. The archaeologist pointed to inscriptions in the wall behind the pillar monument including the letters "PETR... EN I", as the designation of Peter relics. Other archaeological sites in Rome also have similar graffiti, suggesting that therein is a commemoration (by Christians) to Peter and Paul as martyrs.

On 26 June 1968, Pope Paul VI announced that following scientific study, the relics of Saint Peter had been identified convincingly.

== Guided tours ==
Tours of the excavations can be arranged with the Excavations Office in advance; for conservation, the number of visitors is limited. The tour lasts about an hour.

== See also ==
- Saint Peter's tomb
- Index of Vatican City-related articles

== Bibliography ==
- Dally, Ortwin; Zimmermann, Norbert (2024). Studien zur Vatikannekropole. Studientag aus Anlass des 70. Geburtstages von Henner von Hesberg [Studies on the Vatican Necropolis. Study day on the occasion of the 70th birthday of Henner von Hesberg]. Wiesbaden: Harrassowitz, ISBN 978-3-447-12150-7.
- Mielsch, Harald; von Hesberg, Henner (1986–1995). Die heidnische Nekropole unter St. Peter in Rom [The pagan necropolis below St Peter's in Rome]. 2 volumes. Rome: L’Erma di Bretschneider, ISBN 88-7062-604-0 (volume 1) and ISBN 88-7062-903-1 (volume 2) (in German).
- Steinby, Eva Margareta (2003). La necropoli della via triumphalis. Il tratto sotto l’autoparco vaticano [The Necropolis of the Via Triumphalis. The section under the Vatican car park]. Rome: Quasar (in Italian).
- Zander, Pietro (2009). The Necropolis Under St. Peter's Basilica in the Vatican. Fabbrica di San Pietro. ISBN 978-88-7369-081-8.
