= Tomb of the Julii =

Part of the Vatican Necropolis

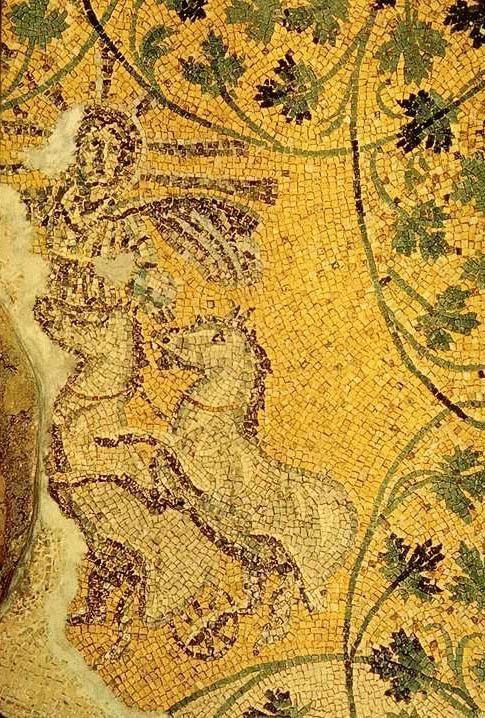
- Detail of the mosaic
- Click on the map for a fullscreen view

General information
- Location: Vatican Necropolis, Vatican City
- Coordinates: 41°54′8″N 12°27′12″E
- Owner: Holy See

The popularly named "Tomb of the Julii" (Mausoleum "M") survives in the Vatican Necropolis beneath St. Peter's Basilica. An inscription over the doorway, now lost, recorded that the tomb was built for Julius Tarpeianus and his family.

This tomb was first discovered in 1574 when workmen accidentally broke through the ceiling while conducting some floor alterations in the basilica. The inside was briefly explored and documented before the opening was sealed over once more.

== Mosaic ==
The serendipitous discovery near the crypt has a vaulted ceiling bearing a mosaic depicting a solar deity with an aureole riding in his chariot, within a framing of rinceaux of vine leaves. Date: 266 CE

The surrounding Christian iconography, such as other mosaics in this tomb depicting Jonah and the whale, the good shepherd carrying a lamb (the kriophoros motif), and fishermen have led to an interpretation of the deity as Christ, known in this form as "Christus-Sol" or "Christ-Apollo". Due to these symbols, the tomb is interpreted as an early Christian vault. Allen Brent has described it as a "synthesis between Christ and Apollo", in the context of Emperor Aurelian's promotion of Sol Invictus as the chief god of the Roman Empire. According to Brent, Sol Invictus - "with whom Apollo also could be identified" - represented the "shared deity of all individual gods", and the Christian creators of the Tomb of the Julii wished to "express the metaphysical order in the cosmos in terms of a Christian syncretism".

== See also ==
- St. Peter's Basilica
- Index of Vatican City-related articles
