= Constitutum Silvestri =

Vatican forgeries

The Constitutum Silvestri is one of five fictitious stories known collectively as the Symmachian forgeries, that arose between 501 and 502 at the time of the political battle for the papacy between Pope Symmachus (498–514) and antipope Laurentius.

The other four, the first two with similar themes to the Constitutum Silvestri, are:

- Gesta synodi Sinuessanae de Marcellino
- Gesta de Xysti purgation
- Gesta de Polychronii episcopi Hierosolynitani accusation
- Gesta Liberii papae

The Constitutum Silvestri (Council of Sylvester), alternately known as one of the Synods of Rome (Mansi refers to it as the Third Council of Rome), was a contrived meeting of Church bishops reported to have been convened by Pope Sylvester I (314–35) to deal with the issues of calculating the date for observing Easter each year and establishing canons for administering the trials of clerics up to and including the pope.

There is a great deal of confusion surrounding the Constitutum Silvestri as there is more than one version, with significant differences, and multiple date references in the different versions and surviving manuscripts; these dating discrepancies are dealt with separately below, but the original version of the story most likely points to 324.

== Disambiguation ==
Adding to the confusion, the opponents of Symmachus reappropriated the Constitutum Silvestri and amended it in the service of their own political agenda, and is referred to by scholars as the Council of 275 Bishops. The most recent thorough scholarship on the Symmachian forgeries was done in German more than twenty-five years ago by Professor Eckhard Wirbelauer, who classifies the original pro-Symmachian version of the Constitutum Silvestri as SK1 (Silvester Konzil). The second revision, designated SK2, borrows elements from both SK1 and the pro-Laurentian Council of 275 Bishops, classified as LK (Laurentian Konzil). For example, the Laurentians forged two letters from the Council of Nicaea to Sylvester: the letter from the council (LB) and Sylvester's answer (LA), which the Symmachian side then, stealing a page from the Laurentian playbook, appropriated for their revised version (SK2) by creating their own Symmachian versions, SB and SA.

Details on the Symmachian forgeries, including those which are not a part of the Constitutum Silvestri, can be found in Townsend and Wirbelauer. Townsend gives a brief summary in English, and Wirbelauer a detailed deconstruction of each in German:

		Townsend		Wirbelauer		
Symmachian Forgeries	Constitutum Silvestri	Group 1	p. 169	SD1	SK1	p. 228
	Gesta Liberius		169		SL	248
	Gesta Xystus (Sixtus)		168		SX	262
	Gesta Polychronius		168		SP	272
	Gesta Marcellino		170		SM	284
	Letter from the Council Fathers in Nicaea	n/a		SDII	SB	304
	Answer from Sylvester to the Council Fathers in Nicaea				SA	306
	Constitutum Silvestri (revised)				SK2	308
Laurentian Forgeries	Letter from the Council Fathers in Nicaea (Quoniam omnia)	Group 2	171	LDIII	LB	318
	Answer from Sylvester to the Council Fathers in Nicaea (Gaudeo promtam)		171		LA	320
	Council of 275 Bishops		171		LK	324

=== Conflicting References ===
Conflicting references in the Constitutum Silvestri, such as how many bishops attended, add to the conflation of the Constitutum Silvestri with the Council of 275 Bishops. The body of the text states 284 bishops (ducentos octoginta quattuor episcopos) attended the Constitutum Silvestri, but then the text goes on to list the attendees, which totals 275. The Council of 275 Bishops doesn't mention 284 in the text, nor does it list the attendees, it just states that 275 attended.

A comparison of the three versions and related errors:

	SK1	LK	SK2	Errors
Location	Baths of Domitian (text) Baths of Trajan (date)	Baths of Domitian	Baths of Domitian (text) Baths of Trajan (date)	Wrongly called Domitian's bath by early Christians; changing usage in different sections of text
Bishops	284 stated, 275 listed	275	284 stated, 260 listed	
Topic	Easter, Clerical Trials	Easter, Promulgation of Canon from Nicaea	Easter, Clerical Trials	
Date^{‡}	3 June [324] Constantine & Prisco (Crispus) in their 3rd terms	20 September [325] Paulinus & Julianus consuls	3 June [324] Constantine 4th term & Prisco	SK1: Crispus & Constantine II in their 3rd terms SK2: 4th term of Constantine & Licinius = 315, 1st term for Crispus = 318
Related Forgeries	SM, SX	LB, LA	SB, SA - Constantine 8th & Constantius 4th terms	Constantius's 1st consulship = 326 Constantine's 8th & Constantine II's 4th = 329 See also notes for Mansi/Hefele

^{‡} See Dates in the Constitutum Silvestri section below for a further discussion.

More conflicting references began appearing as scholars started documenting the forgeries, which depended on what manuscript version they were working from and what access they had to clarifying information in their era. Presumably, Coustant (1654–1721) in his Epistolae Romanorum Pontificum (1721) started using the title of Council of 275 Bishops based on the number listed, and he was followed by Mansi (1692–1769) in his extensive chronicling of the Councils, Sacrorum Conciliorum nova et amplissima collectio (Vol.2, 1759), Hefele (1809–93) in his Conciliengeschichte (History of the Councils of the Church) which derived from Mansi, Duchesne (1843–1922) in his updated analysis of the Liber Pontificalis (1887), and Townsend.

Mansi and Hefele perpetuate the confusion in discussing Sylvester's reply to the letter from the Council of Nicaea (SA), the Symmachian version that corresponds to the Laurentian Gaudeo promtam (LA). The dating clause refers to the supposed date the letter was written, rather than the date the council was held, which still would put it several years after Nicaea in 325.

	SA	Errors
Mansi	Constantine's 8th, Constantii's 4th supposedly 329	Binii's note: 'Sylvester's letter in reply (SA) to that same synod (Nicaea, 325) would be most firmly confirmed, if it weren't considered to be extremely erroneous and almost fabricated on account of the 4th consulship of Constantii (Constantine II or Constantius?) & 8th of Constantine wrongly arranged in it'.
Hefele	Constantine's 7th, Constantine II's 4th supposedly 329	Constantine's 7th term was in 326, when the co-consul, Constantius's II, was in his first term; 329 corresponds to Constantine's 8th and Constantine II's 4th terms, as Binii above notes, which would put it 4 years too late

== Content ==
The five Symmachian forgeries dealt with issues confronting Symmachus during a series of trials, as detailed in the entries on the papacy of Symmachus regarding the ongoing dispute with Laurentius, and each forgery was meant to provide historical precedents to vindicate the pope during his current troubles. The initial two trials proved inconclusive, with the first being held in 501 in Ariminum—modern Rimini. The Symmachian forgeries were written by the pro-Symmachus faction, and therefore are favorable to the charges Symmachus was facing.

Townsend sums up the nature and intent of forgeries:

. . . a forgery, is in most cases useless for the period to which it professes to belong, but it is often of great historical importance for the time in which it was actually written. If it does not give events as they really happened, it at least gives them as the writer would like them to have happened.

Symmachus was accused of celebrating Easter on the wrong date ('Symmachus had celebrated that festival in 501 on March 25, following the old Roman calendar'), misappropriation of Church property, and improper relations with women; it is debatable whether the charges were real or concocted by the Laurentian faction, but each of these three issues were covered independently in the forgeries covering Marcellino (SM), Sixtus (SX), and Sylvester (CS).

Briefly, on the two other forgeries that directly relate to the Constitutum Silvestri:

Acts/Deeds of Marcellino at the Council of Sinuessa (303): Pope Marcellinus (Marcellino, 296–304) supposedly admitted to making pagan sacrifices on the orders of Emperor Diocletian, but the Council 'declared that the pope had condemned himself, since no one had ever judged the pontiff, because the first see will not be judged by anyone.' This is the first instance (retroactively attributed by the Symmachian forgeries) of the Vatican doctrine 'the first See is judged by none' (prima sedes a nemine iudicatur).

Acts/Deeds in the Purification of Xystus (after 443): Pope Sixtus III (Xystus, 432–40) was denounced to Emperor Valentinian III (425–55) in a property dispute and accused of debasing a consecrated virgin. Valentinian called an assembly at which a former Roman consul named Maximus—potentially Petronius Maximus who served his second consulship in 443 and the only Maximus listed for the period overlapping Sixtus and Valentinian—claimed 'it was illegal to pass sentence on a pope.'

The other two forgeries reference issues unrelated to material contained within the Constitutum Silvestri. The Acts/Deeds of the Accusation against Polychronius, Bishop of Jerusalem narrate a story that this fictional bishop had dared to claim that Jerusalem was the first See with himself as the bishop holding primacy over the others. The Acts/Deeds of Pope Liberius (after being exiled circa 355) dealt with the issues of baptism.

=== Constitutum Silvestri ===
The Constitutum Silvestri opens with a reference to Constantine's leprosy which had been cured by Sylvester with baptism, a story that builds upon the legends contained within the Acts of Sylvester. Given that the story of Constantine being cured of leprosy by baptism do not emerge until decades after his death in 337, it would be impossible for this to be an accurate description of an actual event which occurred in his lifetime; further evidence of its fraudulent creation in the early sixth century.

The Constitutum Silvestri issued eighteen canons—some sources state twenty given the text is divided into twenty chapters in most manuscripts, but the first two chapters are only narrative. As with the charges brought against Symmachus, two of the canons resolved the issues that dealt with Easter (canon 2) and accusations against a pope (canon 3), known as the Sylvestrian Accusatorial Canon: '. . . the supreme bishop should not be judged by anyone, since it is written (Luke 6:40; Mathew 10:24): "No student is above his teacher".'

At the fourth trial, the Synod of Palmaris, held on October 23, 502, a decision echoing the precedents created in the forgeries of Marcellino, Sixtus and Sylvester—'the first See is judged by none'—was made, and the bishops concluded that a pope can only be judged by God. This judgment would have long-lasting impacts on papal relations, both within the church to other clerics and with European monarchs, discussed below in the Aftermath section.

Wirbelauer gives a summary of the contextual background on the Symmachian forgeries from pages 66–72, a summary of SK1 on pages 73–78, and the full text of SK1 from pages 228–247 in Latin (even) and German (odd).

==== The first See is judged by none ====
The concept utilized in the Symmachian forgeries in 501–02, that the pope is above judgment, was retroactively attributed to 303 and the trial of Pope Marcellinus. However, this idea made its first appearance only a few years before the Symmachian affair, in the letters of Pope Gelasius. Professor Demacopoulos documents the concepts expressed in Epistle 10 ('the most assertive claim to Roman privilege in all of late antiquity!'), Epistle 26 ('most detailed articulation of Roman authority vis-à-vis other episcopal centers'), and to a lesser degree Epistle 27 ('only the Apostolic See has the authority to absolve another bishop') that fueled the principles put forth in SM, CS, and SX: the pope is above all others and therefore cannot himself be judged.

Epistle 10:

- '[the Rome See] ought to judge the whole Church.'
- '[the Rome See] cannot be judged by anyone.'

Epistle 26: 'The see of blessed Peter the Apostle…has the right to judge the whole church. Neither is it lawful for anyone to judge its judgment.'

Further, Wirbelauer also writes that 'SD II reformulates the rule already known from Gelasius (Ep. 15).

=== Council of 275 Bishops ===
Townsend notes that the three pro-Laurentian forgeries, Quoniam omnia [LB – Wirbelauer classification], Gaudeo promtam [LA], and the Council (Assembly) of 275 Bishops [LK] are 'shorter and written in much better Latin' than the Symmachian forgeries, and while also focused on Sylvester, they are 'not favorable to Symmachus but to his accusers.'

The pro-Laurentian faction reappropriated the idea of a council called by Sylvester used in the Constitutum Silvestri, but in a stroke of rhetorical genius, they placed it shortly after the Council of Nicaea in 325. 'Some supporter of Laurentius, having read the Silvestri constitutum, chose the same method in answering it; but in doing this he pointed out to the assembled bishops that Symmachus, by holding Easter on the twenty-fifth of March, was running counter to the great council of Nicaea.'

The Council of 275 Bishops opens, like the Constitutum Silvestri, by stating that it was called by both Constantine and Sylvester, but no mention of leprosy and baptism was made. This subtle change gave the appearance that the pope, who had not attended this important council, had given his endorsement of the Nicene canons after the fact. Canon one gets straight to the point: 'Whatever is decided in Bithynia's Nicaea for the strength of the Holy Catholic and Apostolic Mother Church of our holy 318 fellow Bishops, we affirm loudly and unanimously.' Interestingly, neither SK1 nor SK2 mention Nicaea which the consular dating puts before 325. Although, the associated letters of the SK2 revisions, SB and SA which mirror the Laurentian versions (LB and LA), do obviously refer to Nicaea and indicate the Symmachian faction used the same tactic of appropriating their opponents propaganda for their own purposes: (SK1 > LK/LB & LA > SB & SA).

Like the Constitutum Silvestri, canon two moves on to the issue of the Easter calculation: 'It is prescribed to all bishops and priests that Easter should be celebrated from the 14th moon to the 21st, depending on how the Sunday shines.' Compare this with the Symmachian proclamation in both SK1 and SK2: 'he fixed April 22 as a celebration.'

Canon four, reflecting the fact that Theodoric, the Ostrogothic king, had called the synods to try Symmachus, states that clerics may not be tried in secular courts but only by the church—the Vatican still makes this claim today in regard to the global scandal of its priests sexually abusing minors, and only requiring that allegations be reported to superiors within the Church, and not to secular authority. However, unlike the Symmachian canons, no mention was made of pope's being above judgment, as in SM and SX, or of the requirement for seventy-two witnesses to convict a bishop.

Canon eight states that priests who engage in sex must perform twelve years of penance—possibly a reference to one of the three charges against Symmachus for having improper relations with women. Canon eighteen prohibits a pope from designating his successor—something Symmachus had done following his contested election with Laurentius, allegedly to prevent such a situation from arising again.

The remainder of the canons in the LK version of the fictitious Council of Sylvester, in keeping with the post-Nicene theme, mostly reiterate the Nicene canonical promulgations. However, in another stark difference to the Symmachian version, though it states Constantine called the council, in the Laurentian version he did not sign off on the issued canons, he just approved them.

== Authorship ==
Wirbelauer speculates that the authors of SK1 and SK2 were two different people, though the 'linguistic unity' across the five Symmachian forgeries indicates one person wrote them all, and that the authors of both versions worked in the 'Roman chancellery' despite Townsend's point on the shockingly bad Latin.

Scholars speculate that Ennodius was the author of at least one of the Symmachian versions. One of the strongest attestations of the role Ennodius played, comes from Pope Gregory VII himself who writes in principle twenty-three of his Dictatus papae, which specifically mentions the fictions surrounding Symmachus:

The Roman Pontiff, if he has been canonically ordained, is undoubtedly made holy by the merits of St. Peter, St. Ennodius Bishop of Pavia bearing witness, and many holy fathers agreeing with him. As it is contained in the decrees of Pope St. Symmachus.

Regarding the Council of 275 Bishops, scholars think it may have been written by Dionysius Exiguus, or as Wirbelauer suggests, if not him then someone close to him. Townsend notes that the canons expressed in the Symmachian forgeries were not included by Dionysius in his collection compiled shortly after 502, which would make sense for him to exclude them if he was indeed the author of, or associated with the faction, that created the Laurentian forgeries.

== Dates in the Constitutum Silvestri ==
Professor Wirbelauer provides a side-by-side comparison of the Latin texts with German, and he puts the date of the Constitutum Silvestri (SK1 and SK2) at 324, while the Council of 275 Bishops deliberately used 325 as a means of retroactively providing Roman sanction for the Council of Nicaea, which Sylvester did not attend.

Professor Tessa Canella suggests that the Constitutum Silvestri supposedly took place in 315 based on the similarities to the Council of the Twelve Jews used in the Acts of Sylvester. Francesco Scorza Barcellona makes the same connection to 315 in the entry for Sylvester in the Encyclopedia of the Popes (2000). This would seem to be an unlikely assertion given the discrepancies in the day and month explicitly stated, in addition to the vastly different topics of discussion at each:

Council of the Twelve Jews - 15 March in the year [315] Constantine and Licinius were in their fourth terms as consuls:

Constantino itaque Augusto et Licinio quater consulibus idibus martiis facta est congregatio chrictianorum et ludaeorum in urbe Roma.

Constitutum Silvestri (SK1) - 3 June in the year [324] Constantine and Prisco [Crispus] were in their third terms as consuls:

Actum in Traianas thermas III Kal. Iunias domno Constantino augusto III et Prisco consule.

There are two problems with this dating. First, Constantine was in his third term as consul in 313, which would predate the Council of the Twelve Jews. Second, it was not Constantine the Great but his son, Constantine II, along with his brother Crispus (Prisco), who were both in their third consular terms in 324. It seems most likely that the forgers did mean 324, and were correct to cite the third terms of Constantine and Crispus, but made the mistake of listing Constantine Augustus instead of his son, the second of his name.

Further, SK2 is slightly different, as it states Constantine's fourth consular term, which did take place in 315:

SK2: 3 June in the year Constantine in this fourth term and Prisco [Crispus] as consuls:

Actum in Traianas thermas III Kal. Iunias domno Constantino augusto IIII et Prisco consule.

Given that Prisco was mentioned again, rather than Licinius who was the co-consul in 315, this makes the change to Constantine's fourth term seem like a perpetuation of the original error, while itself adding more mistakes, and not a deliberate attempt to correct the dating to 315 by moving the narrative in-line with the Council of the Twelve Jews. Had it been a genuine effort on behalf of the forgers to correct the date to 315, then they should have stated the fourth terms for both Constantine and Licinius. More likely the use of the fourth consulship was another in the series of scribal mistakes, not an intentional change, particularly as it makes no mention of which term Prisco was serving as it did in SK1; the first term of Crispus was in 318.

Mistakes are common in the manuscript tradition when it was easy to make a dating error without ready and easy access to chronicles, or for a later scribe to confuse a hastily scribbled and illegible III with IIII. Further, these forgeries were done very quickly and the pamphlets distributed in a rush. The Synod of Palmaris in October 502 returned a verdict that a pope could only be tried by God, which agreed with the sentiments passed in the Macellino, Sixtus, and Sylvester forgeries. Townsend speculates then that the forgeries must therefore have been completed during the first three earlier series of trials in 501 and 502, compounded by the poor Latin, 'terrible, unreadable in places,' and likely written in the vernacular of the street.

In favor of Canella's argument for 315, are the references to the same people officiating the two events, Constantine and Helena who are listed twice as having signed the canons of the council, and a mention of a pagan who later became a fictional city prefect, Calpurnius. This is clearly a link with the mention of these people at the Council of the Twelve Jews. However, the inclusion of Helena and Calpurnius more likely indicated a creative use by the forgers to borrow these elements for the Constitutum Silvestri and not an attempt to place the events in the same year.

The fourth term of Constantine given in SK2 and the same people attending the Constitutum Silvestri and the Council of the Twelve Jews in the Acts are the only clues to 315 being a potential date, and here the similarities end. Instead of Sylvester debating twelve Jewish scholars over the Judeo-Christian scriptures and the power of the Jewish versus Christian gods, Constantine assembles the bishops to discuss the proper dating of the Easter observation and rules for trying clerics, in addition to the different day and month stated and the years implied.

=== Source Materials for the Forgers ===
The biggest clue to 324 being the most likely year, is citing the consulship of Prisco. Wirbelauer mentions Prosper of Aquitaine and his influential history up to 455, Epitoma Chronicon. Prosper is frequently referred to as the chief secretary for Pope Leo, which would have helped make his history popular and widely available, especially to the Symmachian forgers. In the entry for 324, Prosper states: Crispo III et Constantino III, and there is no designation given to distinguish which Constantine (father or son) he means. Additionally, considering it was a major event in Church history, it seems strange that Prosper made no mention of the Council of Nicaea for his entry in 325.

On the issue of the usage of Prisco in place of Crispo, as given in Prosper, Wirbelauer notes that the forgers engaged in wordplay in other examples throughout the forgeries. The changes from Crispus to Priscus, Crispus meaning 'curly/twisted' in Latin and Priscus meaning 'ancient,' may then be a deliberate change made by the author(s) of SK1 and SK2.

== Aftermath ==
The Constitutum Silvestri and its fictions came to be so authoritative that the Laurentian version (LK) was included in the entry for Sylvester in the Liber Pontificalis. Loomis writes in the footnote: 'The records of the council and of the canons promulgated by it and by Sylvester at this time are fabrications of the age of Symmachus, intended to provide sanction for episcopal claims and to exalt the episcopal office in general.' In a further example of the errors which proliferated around the Constitutum Silvestri, this entry in the Liber Pontificalis, which also retroactively sanctioned the Council of Nicaea through its usage of LK, then went on to produce yet another discrepancy: stating 277 bishops, rather than 275. Davis notes that the councils created in the Symmachian forgeries, their original forged pedigree forgotten, are depicted in murals at the Basilica of San Sebastiano in Rome.

Demacopoulos notes that the Liber Pontificalis emerged around 530, shortly after the Symmachus affair, building upon the fictitious papal biographies created during this period by the two factions, and the 'heroes of these papal biographies . . . demonstrate a new form of papal rhetoric.' Specifically, the Constitutum Silvestri would 'insulate the papacy from both secular and rival ecclesiastical interference.'

In an interesting footnote, Demacopoulos notes that canon four of the Constitutum Silvestri would have been a particular threat to the Laurentians, as it stated that the property of priests, including those not beholden to papal interests, was to be turned over to the Roman Church upon their death. The titular churches, supported by aristocrats in the camp of Laurentius, had been established by the cults of earlier Christian martyrs and had remained independent of the cult of Peter based in the Lateran and Vatican basilicas. While the Council of 275 Bishops version was used for the Liber Pontificalis, canon four of the Constitutum Silvestri also came to be included in service of subordinating these other cults to the Vatican 'by fabricating a papal role in the creation and organization of the tituli churches.'

The repercussions of the Constitutum Silvestri extended far beyond their simple inclusion in the Liber Pontificalis, as three hundred years later the concept of papal immunity would be put to the test under Pope Leo III. Mirroring the situation of Symmachus in 501, Leo was accused by the supporters of his predecessor, Adrian I, of adultery and perjury. Leo sought shelter from his accusers in the court of Charlemagne who convened a council in December 800 to hear the charges. Leo, in the first instance of prima sedes a nemine iudicatur, invoked the immunity of the accusatorial canon and swore an oath of innocence before Charlemagne on December 23—and two days later, Leo crowned Charlemagne the first Holy Roman Emperor. Thereafter, prima sedes a nemine iudicatur would enter the texts of Catholic canon law.

Elliot expands on the importance of this development, noting it became of 'great importance to the history of canon law in the West.' Elliot notes that the Sylvester Accusatorial Canon (3)—the first see is judged by none—was 'frequently transmitted in systematic canon law collections separately from the rest of the Symmachiana, and even from the rest of the [Constitutum Silvestri].' Elliot continues:

By the ninth century the canon had entered into pseudo-Isidore . . . . From the ninth-century onwards, the accusatorial canon's claim that no bishop shall be deposed without the endorsement of seventy-two of his peers was frequently cited by popes as an established canonical principle. It had, in effect, made the journey from outright forgery to accepted canonical text in the space of little over four centuries. From pseudo-Isidore it entered Burchard, from Burchard Ivo, and from Ivo Gratian.
It is no surprise that the Symmachian forgers chose Pope Sylvester as the figure to pronounce their apocryphal canons. Sylvester's celebrity had grown enormously following the fourth century, for it was he who, by baptising Constantine and (supposedly) curing him of his leprosy, was seen as having delivered Christians from a condition of persecution to one of state sponsorship. . . . It was doubtless this canon's perceived origin at this special moment in Christian history that explains why the [Silvestri Constitutum], and the accusatorial canon in particular, came to gain such popularity among medieval canonists.

By 1162, the issue of clerics being subject to secular law came to a head in England in the face-off between Henry II and Thomas Becket. The Constitutum Silvestri, while not playing a direct role in the dispute, may have influenced the canonists who fought back against what they saw as the secular encroachment of the state into what canon law states was the domain of the Church.

The Sylvester Accusatorial Canon continued its journey from forgery into medieval canon, and onwards to become enshrined in the current Vatican canon law (1404), which still proclaims: 'The First See is judged by no one.

=== Immunity versus Infallibility ===
The concept of papal immunity is separate from that of papal infallibility, itself a new concept that would not emerge until over one thousand years after the Symmachian forgeries. Just as Demacopoulos points out that the original declarations of primacy that had begun to emerge with Damasus I and Leo I in the fourth and fifth centuries were a manifestation of bluster which had no bearing in reality but nevertheless 'became an important rhetorical and polemical feature of all subsequent papal and Petrine narratives,' the proclamation of papal infallibility was also tied to inherent weakness. Following the collapse of the Papal States to the new Italian state and the loss of all his temporal power, Pius IX retreated into the Vatican in 1870 and declared himself a prisoner—no pope would leave the Vatican until 1929 after Pius XI signed the Lateran Treaty. To deal with the frustrations he faced in the modern, liberal world that increasingly demanded democracy (see Quanta cura and the Syllabus of Errors for the reactionary dogmatism against modernism), Pius IX called the First Vatican Council in which the doctrine of papal infallibility was created to compensate for the existential crisis of lost earthly power.

In 1971, Swiss priest and theologian Hans Küng challenged this doctrine in his book, Infallible?: An Inquiry. He was stripped of his ability to teach as a Catholic theologian in 1979 for his opposition to Catholic dogma of papal infallibility.
