= Acts of Sylvester =

Series of legendary tales

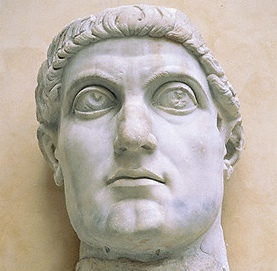
Bust of Constantine

The Acts of Sylvester (Latin: Actus Silvestri) are a series of legendary tales about the fourth-century bishop of Rome, Sylvester I. Sylvester was the bishop of Rome at the critical point in European history when Constantine the Great became the first Christian emperor. Yet, despite the claims that arose in later centuries of Roman primacy, some academics question whether Sylvester played a significant role in the Christianization of the Roman Empire during this crucial period. They contend these legends arose in order to augment the reputation of Sylvester and to correct a number of embarrassing events for the Church, such as his conspicuous absence at both the Synod of Arles in 314 and the First Council of Nicaea in 325, and the fact that Constantine had been baptized by an Arian bishop.

Sapienza Università di Roma professor, Tessa Canella, has written extensively on Pope Sylvester and the Actus in both English and Italian since the early 2000s. Canella's work provides some of the most recent and in-depth scholarship on the origins of the legends, including two detailed works in Italian: Gli Actus Silvestri: Genesi di una leggenda su Costantino imperatore, a book-length study that provides a comprehensive examination of the texts; and a summarized, journal-length version of the former, Gli Actus Silvestri fra Oriente e Occidente: Storia e diffusione di una leggenda Costantiniana. Canella notes that the most recent edition of the Acts was done in 1974 by Pietro De Leo, Ricerche sui falsi medioevali (Research on Medieval Fakes), with the older Latin version published in 1480 by Bonino Mombrizio (Mombritius) available online. Canella states that the Acts had a specific purpose: to create an alternative history and counter the sources that mention the Arian baptism, specifically to give Constantine an orthodox baptism given by the bishop of Rome himself.

== Background ==
Constantine's deathbed baptism by the Arian Bishop Eusebius of Nicomedia was well-documented by a number of sources. The first record came from his contemporary biographer, Eusebius of Caesarea in his Life of Constantine. Jerome's Chronicon (380 CE) also mentions the Arian baptism. Ambrose, bishop of Milan, 374–97, mentions the deathbed baptism but omits the name of the minister administering the sacrament in an attempt to present a more orthodox version in De obitu Theodosii (40:8). Augustine, bishop of Hippo, 395 to 430, easily the most influential of all the Latin fathers on Roman Catholic doctrine, in City of God (Book V, 25) simply omitted the inconvenient truth of the Arian baptism: 'He died at a great age, of sickness and old age, and left his sons to succeed him in the empire.'

== Content ==
The main narrative can be divided into four parts written over two books (two parts per book).

=== Part one (Mombritius, 508–510) ===
The Acts open with a description of the early life of Sylvester, born to a pious widow named Giusta. Later in life, a fictitious Roman prefect named Tarquino has Sylvester arrested and orders the young man to make pagan sacrifices, which Sylvester refuses. Sylvester prophesies that Tarquino will die and asks him to repent. The next day, Tarquino dies just as Sylvester predicted, and he is subsequently released and ordained as a priest. Following the death of Pope Miltiades (311–14), Sylvester is elected pope in which his charity and pastoral care are notable signatures of his papacy.

=== Part two (Mombritius, 510–515) ===
The second part is the most well-known section of the Acts, and arguably had the most influential aspect on Catholic apologetics. Constantine, stricken with leprosy, consults numerous magicians and physicians to no avail when he is finally advised by the pagan priests to bathe in the warm blood of children. Constantine is moved by the desperation of the mothers and decides not to proceed with sacrificing innocent children for his own sake. That night, Constantine has a dream where he is visited by Peter and Paul who instruct Constantine to seek out Pope Sylvester in order to be healed. Peter and Paul had been sent by Jesus to Constantine because of the piety he showed in refusing to kill the children to save himself. Constantine sends for Sylvester to be brought to Rome, and upon arrival, Constantine tells Sylvester of the dream. Constantine asks to see pictures of the two saints, and confirms that they are the men who appeared to him in his dream.

Constantine then undertakes his first profession of faith by fasting for a week, after which, Sylvester baptizes Constantine at the Lateran Palace in Rome (a building which Constantine had already donated to the Christian Church around 313, a fact missed by the forgers of the legend), and the scales immediately dropped from his skin. This story counters Constantine's baptism by an Arian bishop and is notable for its propaganda as a Nicene orthodox reimagining of the facts.

The Acts then narrate an entire series of fictions which are all favorable to Christians, and more directly for the Roman Church: Jesus is to be worshipped throughout the Roman Empire, blasphemy and injury to Christians is a punishable offense, the bishop of Rome has primacy over all other bishops, and the right of asylum for churches. Finally, Constantine traced out the foundations for the Lateran basilica to be built next to the palace and began construction the next day. In conjunction with the evolution of concepts of papal primacy over the centuries, this series of Constantine's bequests to the Roman Church would become the basis of the forged Donation of Constantine centuries later.

=== Part three (Mombritius, 515–529) ===
The third section narrates a dispute between Sylvester and twelve Jewish representatives and is the main focus of the second book. Canella notes that details vary across all three versions (A, B, and C) of the Actus. Helena, the mother of Constantine, had converted to Judaism and wrote a letter to her son to applaud his conversion from paganism but urged him to follow the true god of the Jews. Constantine proposes a contest between the Jews and Pope Sylvester, which claimed to have taken place in Rome on 15 March 315; the year 315 corresponds to the time that Constantine and Licinius were both in their fourth terms as consuls:

Constantino itaque Augusto et Licinio quater consulibus idibus martiis facta est congregatio chrictianorum et ludaeorum in urbe Roma.

Sylvester triumphs over the twelve, which Canella states are 'chosen from among rabbis, law experts, scribes and masters of the synagogue'. In the final confrontation, a Jew by the name of Zambri shows the power of the Jewish god by saying the secret name of Yahweh into the ear of a bull, brought there specifically for this demonstration, which immediately dies. Sylvester, not to be outdone, proves the superiority of the Christian god by invoking the name of Jesus and resurrects the bull. Amazed by the power of the Christian god, Helen, the philosopher judges Crato and Zenophilus, and three thousand Jews convert to Christianity.

While this council was not real, in a case of life imitating fiction, an event occurred in 1240 under Pope Gregory IX and is known as the Disputation of Paris; and Canella discusses more similar disputes in her book. Oxford professor, Diarmaid MacCulloch, notes that while Greek language skills had declined among Latin scholars, many knew Hebrew precisely because there was a large community of Jewish rabbis in Europe ready, willing, and able to challenge Christians and their misinterpretations of the Hebrew Bible and other Jewish writings, such as the Babylonian Talmud; a document containing passages derogatory of Jesus which sparked the Disputation of Paris in the first place.

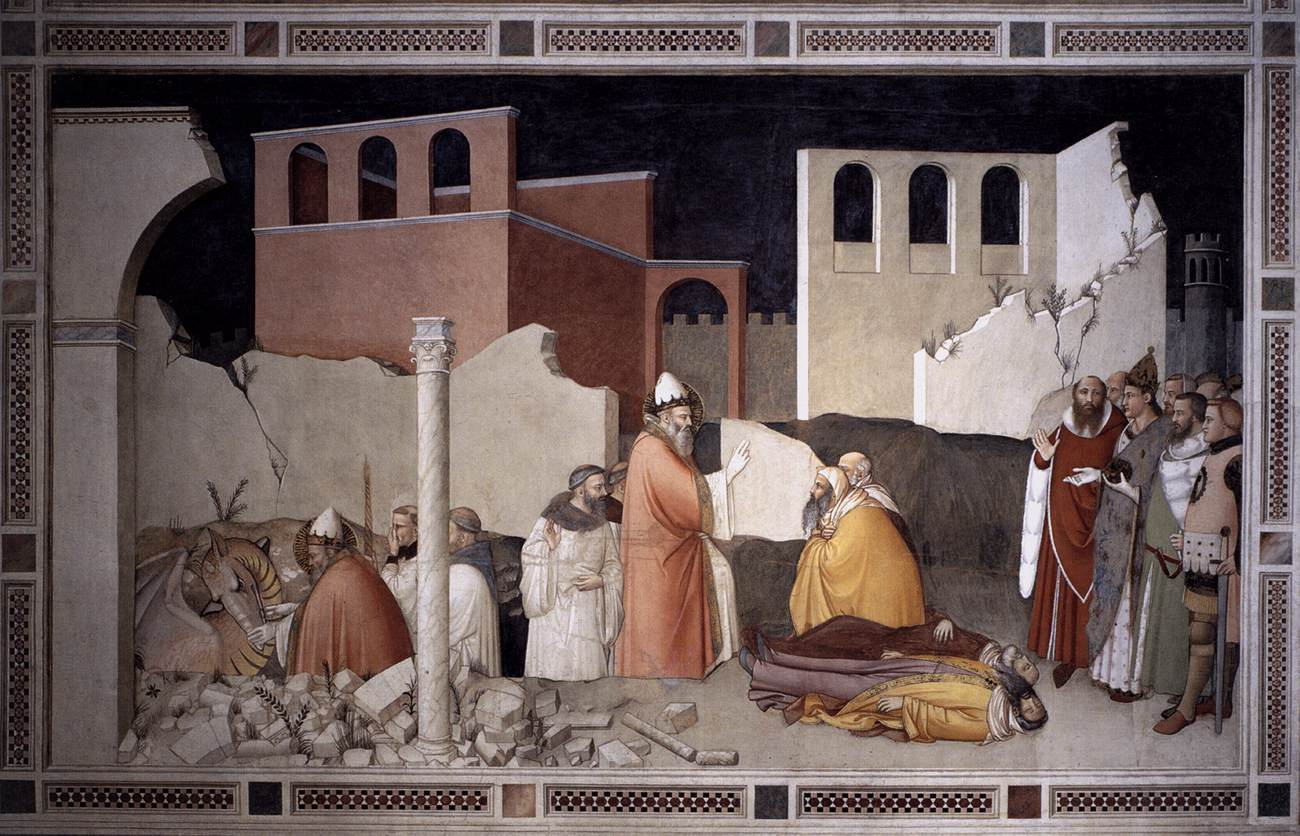
Sylvester defeats the dragon, Maso di Banco

=== Part four (Mombritius, 529–531) ===
The Acts concludes with the most exaggerated story in the series of legends, in which Sylvester tames a dragon that had been killing Roman inhabitants every day since the conversion of Constantine. The dragon became angered by the fact that it no longer received its proper sustenance from the Vestals, and was finally stopped by Sylvester sealing its mouth until Judgment Day. As with the debate with the Jewish scholars who were amazed by the power of the Vicar of Christ, more than thirty thousand pagans, including another fictional prefect, Calpurnius, convert to Christianity.

== Origins ==
The date and location of the emergence of the Acts remains a matter of scholarly debate, but the legends are thought to have arisen sometime between the end of the fourth or beginning of the fifth century; though some scholars have speculated an earlier mid-fourth-century origin. Dating the texts accurately is compounded by the fact that there are multiple versions across several languages which share a majority of the content, but all differ slightly in details:

The Acts of Sylvester have an extremely complex textual history and the lack of any modern critical edition. According to Levison's classification (later refined in particular by Pohlkamp), there are three main versions: A, B and C. Version A, in two books, is the earliest, while B and C modify and augment the original narrative. A manuscript fragment of A or B dating from the 5th century (Klagenfurt, Universitätsbibliothek, Perg. Hs. 48) shows that the text was composed by the 5th century at the latest, while there are more than 200 manuscripts of the various versions from the 8th century onwards (notably Munich, BSB, Clm 3514). The Acts were also translated into Greek, then Syriac, and Armenian.

The Acts can be described as an evolving text, with several additions and alterations over centuries. The precise origin and date of composition of the Acts remains uncertain (see the bibliography for major studies exploring this issue). The prologue appended to the Acts in several manuscripts, and which may or may not have been part of the original narrative, presents the Acts as the translation from the Greek of a life composed by Eusebius of Caesarea. However, the comparison of the Syriac, Greek and Latin versions of the Acts, and particularly the vocabulary, liturgy, and topography points to a writing of the earliest version in Rome in Latin between the late 4th and 5th centuries.

Canella notes that the Mombritius and De Leo versions derive from the C group. Canella discusses how various oral stories were circulating prior to the first, and therefore oldest, text that is written in Latin (A), which has distinctly Roman traits. Further, Canella speculates that the baptismal legend had likely not begun to circulate 'when Ambrose, Rufinus, Augustine, and Orosius provide their 'disguised' versions ... in some cases completely silent about the baptism'.

The story came to be accepted by Trinitarian apologists and it was included in the entry for Sylvester in the Liber Pontificalis (Book of the Popes) in the middle of the sixth century. Gregory of Tours (538–94) was the first Latin historian to cite the baptism by Sylvester in his History of the Franks. Yet, Gregory's contemporary, Isidore of Seville, cites the accepted Arian tradition in his Chronica Majora (VII), which 'testifies that the Orthodox version was not unanimously adopted'. Centuries later there were still those who dismissed the baptism by Sylvester in favor of the original tradition. Professor Johannes Fried notes that in the twelfth century, Otto of Freising considered the baptism by Sylvester to be propaganda meant to elevate the Church, a story he knew derived from the Acts that was promoted by the Romans as a challenge to the other sources, particularly the Tripertita hystoria:

Otto . . . arrived at the following conclusion: “Thus what is written about (Constantine's) leprosy and conversion in the life of Saint Sylvester would seem to be apocryphal” (Chr. IV,1). In the 13th century an anonymous reader was not pleased with such distrust of holy authority and hastily scribbled “The master is mistaken here” in the margin of the codex, “for the Roman curia assumes the opposite, and is to be preferred”.

=== Syriac Version ===
Canella points out early precursors of the leprosy/baptism myth appeared in Syriac writings prior to its subsequent revision for Roman purposes, such as a homily attributed to James of Sarûg, 'probably in an era preceding all the Roman apocryphals, but after 473'. Canella notes a significant difference in this version, such as Constantine having suffered leprosy from birth and that the baptism was not conducted by Sylvester, but by a bishop undeserving of the title. Further, Canella notes that the Acts parallels stories found in the Acts of Giuda Ciriaco, such as the discovery of the true cross, the Council of the Twelve Jews, and the baptism of Constantine by a Roman bishop—not Sylvester, but Eusebius of Rome.

Jonathan Stutz also notes the early existence of the legends in Syriac, and their later inclusion into Islamic writings. In addition to the homily of Sarûg, the Syriac versions of the story appear in the histories of Zacharias Rhetor and the Chronicle of Zuqnin. The story then makes its first appearance in Arabic in the tenth-century works of Agapius of Hierapolis (Maḥbūb al-Manbiǧī), in which Sylvester enters the narration following Constantine's vision of the cross at the Battle of Milvian Bridge in 312. Another tenth-century Syriac version of the legend, the Chronicle of Seert, demonstrates the narrative was in 'wide circulation across the lands under Islamic rule'.

== Propagation of the myth ==
Professor Paolo Liverani writes that a mosaic and an inscription of the mid-fifth century over the façade of the original St. Peter's Basilica is the earliest attestation of the myth that Constantine was afflicted with leprosy as it appears in the Acts of Sylvester. Further, Liverani reveals elements of Constantine's relation to the basilica were noted by Pope Leo I (440–461) during the Sack of Rome in 455 by the Vandals:

You who consecrated the church in the name of Peter and to whom
you gave orders to feed your flock, O Christ
through the prayers of the same [Peter], may you always preserve these halls
that they remain unviolated as your redoubt.

The oldest surviving written reference to the myth of the baptism by Sylvester occurs in the Pseudo-Gelasian Decretum (4.4.3), purportedly written by Pope Gelasius I (492–496), but which was written in the middle of the 500s and states: 'Likewise the Acts of blessed Sylvester bishop of the apostolic seat, although the name of him who wrote [them] is unknown, [but] we know to be read by many Catholics however in the city of Rome and because of the ancient use of the multitude this is imitated by the church.'

Within five years of the death of Gelasius, a new series of forgeries were created during the power struggle between antipope Laurentius and Pope Symmachus (498–514), known as the Symmachian forgeries. One of the forgeries, the Constitutum Silvestri, has parallels to part three of the Acts with certain similarities to the Council Of The Twelve Jews in 315, and opens with a short preamble on the leprosy of Constantine and his cure via baptism.

The cult of Sylvester continued to grow based on the legendary stories in the Acts. Gregory the Great, pope 590–604, was the first to cite the monastery on Mount Soratte, which, according to part two of the Acts, was the location where Sylvester had taken refuge during Constantine's fictional persecutions of Christians when he was summoned by Constantine to Rome that resulted in the conversion and baptism.

By the eighth century, the 'Actus Silvestri was officially consecrated by the papacy of Rome at the time of Adrian I (772–795), and as such was handed down beyond the sixteenth century.' Adrian wrote a letter mentioning the baptism of Constantine by Sylvester to Emperor Constantine VI and Empress Irene, which was read out at the Second Council of Nicaea in 787.

By the ninth century, two more forgeries emerged building on the stories in the Acts. Professor Fried details the creation and emergence of the two documents, the Pseudo-Isidore False Decretals and what he terms the Constitutum Constantini, a forerunner of the later Donation of Constantine. The forgeries were created in reaction to the decline of Charlemagne's Carolingian dynasty to deal with the political situation in the Frankish kingdom, and made their first appearance at the Field of Lies in 833 when they were presented to Pope Gregory IV (827–844). Fried notes that the Constitutum Constantini quotes the Acts of Sylvester word for word, and that the political situation of that era fueled the forceful claims of a universal church, headed by a universal pope, a pope who had been equated with the status of an emperor without actually making him an emperor. The result of this elevated status implied the bishop of Rome held equality with the emperor in Church matters, but was above the emperor in others; a concept first elaborated in the Doctrine of Two Powers by Pope Gelasius at the end of the fifth century.

It was through Pseudo-Isidore that the forged constitution proliferated and entered the collective conscious of Western Europe, eventually becoming the basis for the fraudulent eleventh-century Donation of Constantine, 'Indeed, the most infamous forgery in the history of the world.' Pope Leo IX (1049–1054) was the first to make use of the 'Donation' in a letter to Michael I, Patriarch of Constantinople, asserting the bishop of Rome's primacy over the other four patriarchs, a move that directly contributed to the Great Schism of 1054, in addition to the insertion of the Filioque Clause into the Nicene Creed, that has split the Roman Catholic and Eastern Orthodox Churches ever since.

The popes following Leo, Gregory VII (1073–1085) and Urban II (1088–1099), went even further by claiming privileges beyond what was included in the Donation, such as the papacy being granted power over the entire Western Roman Empire. Fried notes that following these creeping power claims, increasingly 'imperial elements' came to be included in the papal coronation ritual. Fried also notes another forgery, Pseudo-Julius, which frequently quotes Bishop Ennodius, who is relevant for two reasons. One, he is considered to be (one of?) the author(s) of the pro-Symmachian forgeries, such as the Constitutum Silvestri. ['Linguistic unity or diversity suggest that all texts in an edition were written by one person'.] Two, Ennodius is cited directly by Gregory VII in relation to his reform program, in principal twenty-three of his Dictatus papae, which specifically mentions the fictions surrounding Symmachus:

The Roman Pontiff, if he has been canonically ordained, is undoubtedly made holy by the merits of St. Peter, St. Ennodius Bishop of Pavia bearing witness, and many holy fathers agreeing with him. As it is contained in the decrees of Pope St. Symmachus.

== Use of the legend ==
MacCulloch notes that Gregory VII's formulations in the Dictatus papae portray the pope as a universal monarch who had authority over all earthly kingdoms. The myths about Constantine and Sylvester that had started late in the fourth or early fifth centuries as the Acts of Sylvester had morphed into a potent political weapon of the papacy as revolutionary declarations of universal power evolved. In a period of church–state clashes over authority with the Holy Roman Emperor, MacCulloch writes that the Donation of Constantine did not go far enough to suit Gregory's agenda, especially since papal authority over the Western Empire only came as a gift from a secular ruler; a concept which contradicted Gregory's ideas of the papacy having authority exceeding that of monarchy. During the Investiture Controversy (1076–1122), which revolved around whether the pope or the king had the right to appoint bishops and abbots, Gregory twice excommunicated Emperor Henry IV. In 1077, in a humiliating act of subjugation of a monarch by the pope, known as the Road to Canossa, Gregory allegedly made Henry wait barefoot in the snow for three days before offering absolution to the penitent emperor.

Starting in 1227 in a prolonged showdown between Emperor Frederick II and Pope Gregory IX (1227–41) that mirrored the confrontations between Henry IV and Gregory VII, Gregory IX also declared his power over mere terrestrial kings. Having previously excommunicated Frederick twice, in 1227 and 1228 over the handling of the Sixth Crusade, in 1236 Gregory wrote an impudent letter, epistle 703, that drew directly on the imperial privileges that succeeding popes had extended beyond what was granted since the Donation's emergence. Gregory portrays Constantine as having submitted imperial authority not just to the papacy but to the entire priesthood. This was an open challenge to the power of the Holy Roman Emperor, constituting an unprecedented projection of power, claiming:

Constantine had granted the pope “primacy over things and bodies in the whole world” (“rerum et corporum primatum”), in analogy to his spiritual primacy over priesthood and souls in toto orbe. . . .
. . . You see the necks of kings and princes prostrate at the feet of priests, and Christian emperors must subject their actions not only to the Roman Pontifex, but have to respect other priests just as highly.

Fried notes that while Frederick simply ignored the popes assertions, others did not reject this projection of power and accepted that Constantine's Donation of imperial power to the bishop of Rome was legitimate, and thus papal jurisdiction was something contemporary monarchs were powerless to contest. Consequently, Frederick became the first recipient of such papal exaggerated claims of imperial submission.

In 1245, Pope Innocent IV (1243–54) went even further than Gregory, issuing a papal bull declaring that he had the power to depose Frederick:

Furthermore this privilege which our lord Jesus Christ handed to Peter and in him to his successors, namely, whatever you bind on earth shall be bound in heaven, and whatever you loose on earth shall be loosed in heaven, in which assuredly consists the authority and power of the Roman church, he did his best to diminish or take away from the church itself, writing that he did not fear Pope Gregory's condemnations. For, not only by despising the keys of the church he did not observe the sentence of excommunication pronounced against him, but also by himself and his officials he prevented others from observing that and other sentences of excommunication and interdict, which he altogether set at nought [sic]. . . .

. . . Given at Lyons on 17 July in the third year of our pontificate.

What started off as imaginary tales meant to rehabilitate the image of a pope who had done nothing during the reign of the first Christian Roman emperor, and compounded by the embarrassment of Constantine's Arian baptism in 337, had transformed into a full-blown cult that eventually accreted enough power for a pope to depose a Holy Roman Emperor nine hundred years later. Canella states that the Acts of Sylvester were simply the opening volley in a series of legends that had grown around Sylvester and culminated in the bishops of Rome becoming the beneficiaries of the Donation of Constantine; an infamous fraud proven to be a fake by Nicholas of Cusa and Lorenzo Valla in the 15th century.

== Depictions in artwork ==
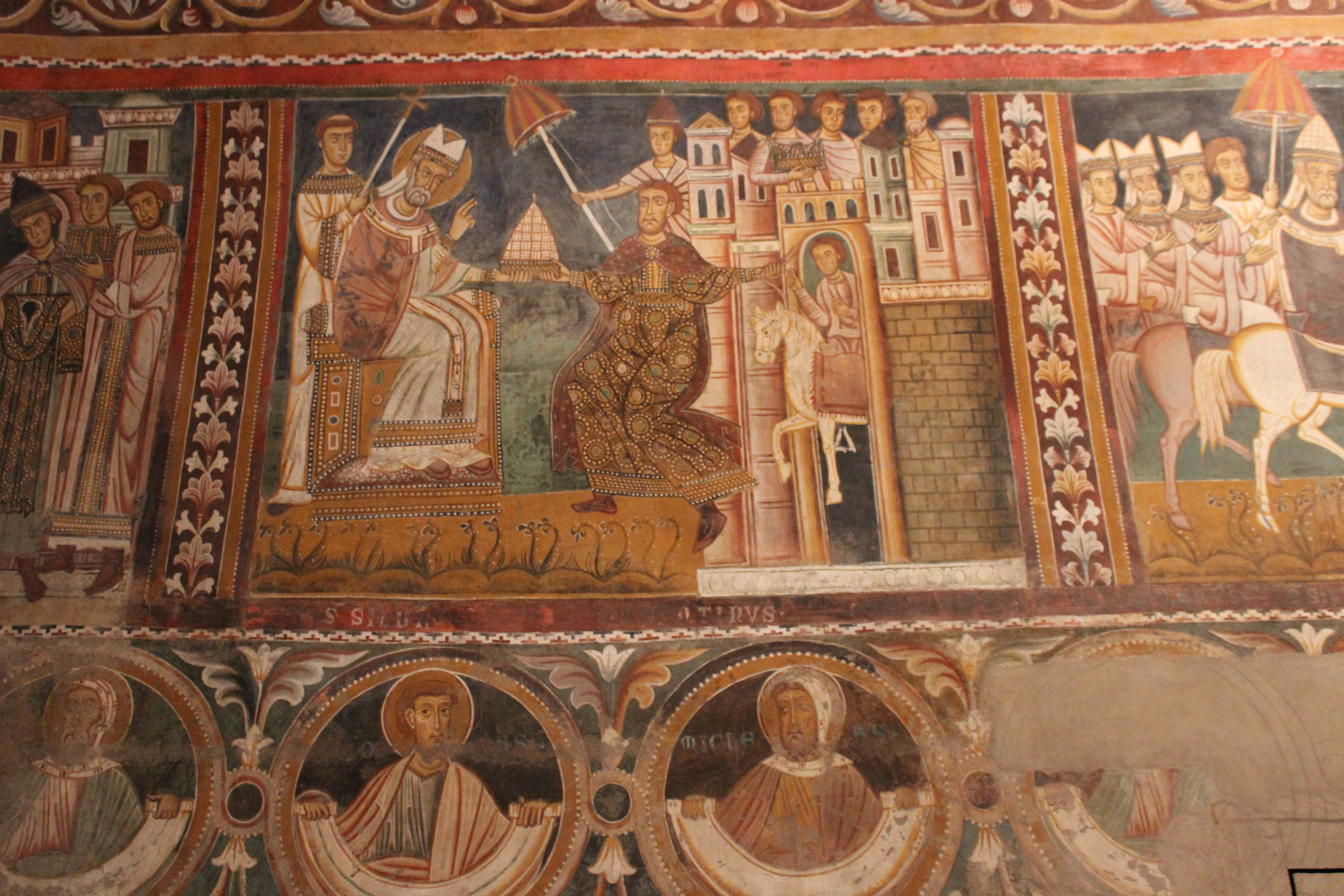
Acts of Sylvester, Constantine, kneeling in submission, gives the papal crown to Sylvester

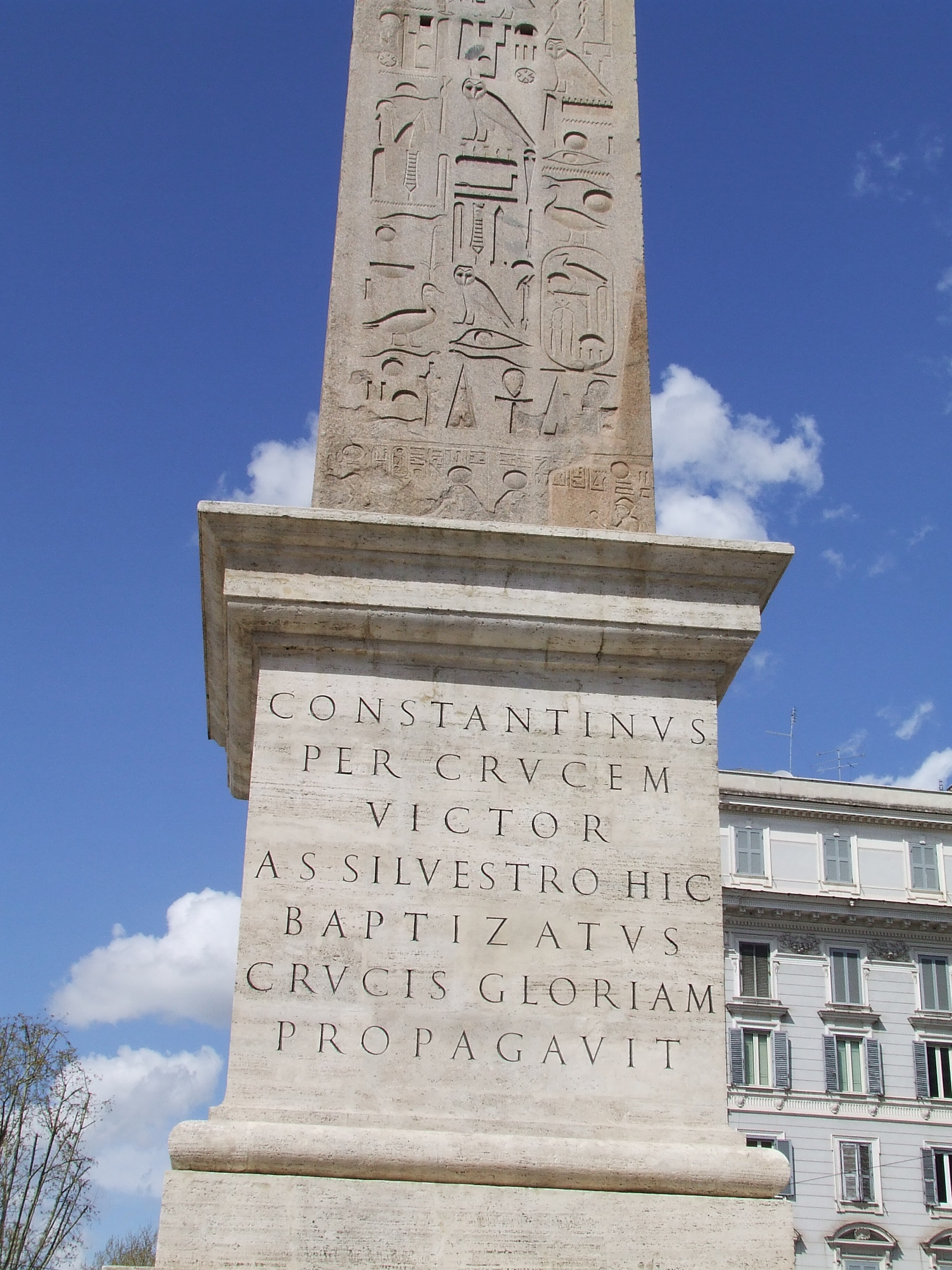
The inscription on the Lateran Obelisk claims that it marks the location of Constantine's baptism.

Concurrent with the deposition of Frederick by Innocent in 1245, the stories of the Acts begin to appear in iconography. In the Chapel of Saint Sylvester at the Santi Quattro Coronati basilica in Rome, dedicated in 1247, a series of very crude frescoes depict the events of the Acts of Sylvester. Fried notes the subtlety of the political messages being conveyed in the artwork, expressions created at the apex of conflict between pope and emperor. In one fresco, Constantine can be seen handing the papal tiara to Sylvester, and in another Constantine is acting as a groom handling the reins of the horse that Sylvester is riding. The art depicts a submissive Constantine through both 'gift and attendance' while simultaneously avoiding the awkward truth that the Donation implied: the papacy derived its authority via imperial grant, not from God.

In a series of three frescoes depicting the story of Constantine's leprosy and cure, Constantine is shown to be bed-ridden when Peter and Paul appear to him and tell him to summon the pope, kneeling before Sylvester while being shown the pictures of Peter and Paul, and being baptized; in the third scene of the baptism, the leper spots in the first two images have disappeared.

Around 1260, a book on the lives of the saints was written by Jacobus de Voragine, called the Golden Legend, which includes the debate with the twelve rabbis and the conquest of the dragon. In the Basilica of Saint Croce in Florence, is a painting by Maso di Banco done in 1340, derived from the Golden Legend, and depicts three motifs of the dragon legend: the pagan priests complaining to Constantine of the dragon (right), Sylvester's defeat of the dragon (left), and Sylvester using the power of Christ to resurrect two pagan priests killed by the dragon (middle).

The story of the baptism of Constantine and the Donation of the Western Roman Empire to the Church were such a part of the collective European consciousness, that several Renaissance artists depicted the stories even after Nicholas of Cusa and Valla had proven the Donation was a forgery in the fifteenth century. Between 1508 and 1524, Raphael and his students painted both the Baptism of Constantine and the Donation of Rome, plus two others, the Vision of the Cross and the Battle with Maxentius, for the Room of Constantine in one of Raphael's Rooms which are part of the Vatican Museum. Around 1630, Jacopo Vignali painted Sylvester baptizing Constantine, which is currently hanging in the Palatine Museum.

In 1588, in the spirit of Counter-Reformation apologetics, Pope Sixtus V restored the Lateran Obelisk in the Piazza San Giovanni in front of the Lateran Palace, complete with an inscription on the base detailing the baptism of Constantine by Sylvester.
