= Coletti =

Coletti is an Italian surname. Notable people with the surname include:

- Alex Coletti, executive producer and director for MTV Networks
- Alexandra Coletti (born 1983), Italian-born alpine skier for Monaco
- Antonio Magini-Coletti (1855–1912), Italian operatic baritone
- Dado Coletti, stage name of Riccardo Broccoletti (born 1974), Italian actor
- Edward "Ed" Coletti, American poet
- Giovanni Giacomo Coleti or Coletti (1734–1827), Italian historian and philologist
- Giambattista Coletti (born 1948), Italian, Olympic silver medal in fencing at Montreal 1976
- Giandomenico Coleti (1727–1798), Jesuit priest and writer
- Giovanna Maria Coletti, real name of Jo Squillo (born 1962), Italian singer and TV presenter
- Jean Coletti, French name for Ioannis Kolettis (died 1847), Prime Minister of Greece
- John Coletti (born 1949), American automobile engineer
- Joseph Coletti (1896–1973), Italian-born American sculptor
- Mattia Coletti (born 1984), Italian ski mountaineer
- Nicola Coleti or Coletti (1680–1765), Italian Catholic priest and historian
- Paul Coletti (born 1959), Scottish viola soloist and chamber musician

== Fictional characters ==
- Rick Coletti, a character on the American television series Desperate Housewives

== See also ==
- Where Is Coletti?, a 1913 German silent comedy film directed by Max Mack
