= Pope Sylvester I =

Head of the Catholic Church from 314 to 335

Pope Saint Sylvester I
- Bishop of Rome
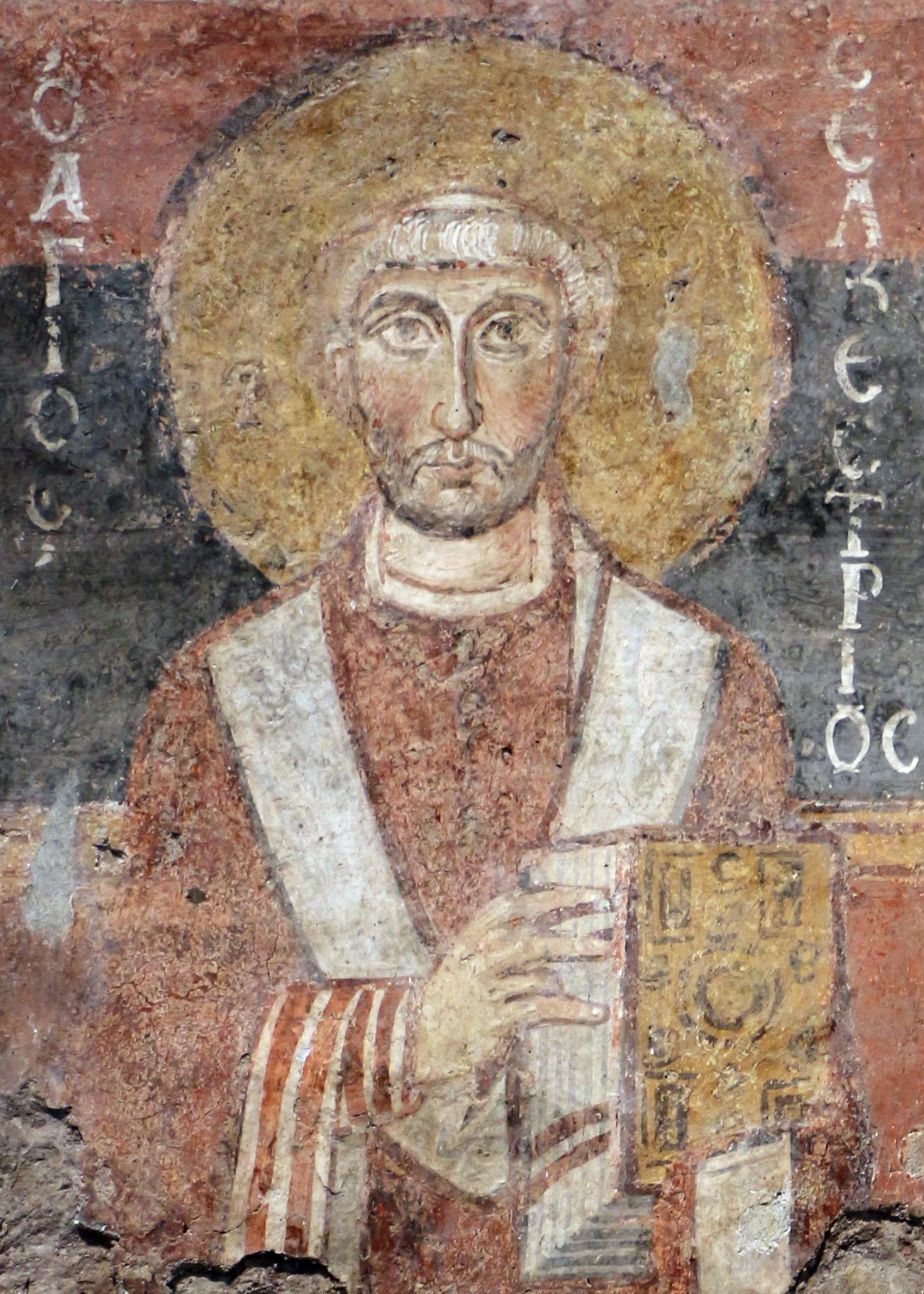
- Fresco in Santa Maria Antiqua, Rome
- Church: Catholic Church
- Papacy began: 31 January 314
- Papacy ended: 31 December 335
- Predecessor: Miltiades
- Successor: Mark

Personal details
- Born: Asculam, Italy, Roman Empire
- Died: 31 December 335 Rome, Italy, Roman Empire

Sainthood
- Feast day: 31 December (Catholic); 2 January in the revised calendar and 15 January in the traditional (Orthodox); 22 December (Armenian)
- Venerated in: Catholic Church; Anglican Communion; Eastern Orthodox Church; Oriental Orthodoxy; Lutheran Church
- Attributes: Papal vestments; Papal tiara; Bull; Dragon
- Patronage: Feroleto Antico; Sylvestrine; Benedictines; Nonantola

Pope Sylvester I (also Silvester, before 284 – 31 December 335) was the bishop of Rome from 31 January 314 until his death on 31 December 335. He filled the See of Rome at an important era in the history of the Western Church, though very little is known of his life.

During his pontificate, he notably convened the Council of Arles in 314, which condemned the separatist Donatist sect, and the First Council of Nicaea in 325, which aimed to resolve the Arian controversy.

Sylvester I's pontificate coincided with the construction of churches including Old St. Peter's Basilica, the Basilica of the Holy Cross in Jerusalem (Santa Croce in Gerusalemme), as well as the Archbasilica of Saint John Lateran. His feast is celebrated as Saint Sylvester's Day, on 31 December in Western Christianity, and on 2 January in Eastern Christianity.

== Personal biography ==
The accounts of his pontificate preserved in the seventh- or eighth-century Liber Pontificalis contain little more than a record of the gifts said to have been conferred on the church by Constantine I, although it does say that he was the son of a Roman named Rufinus.

== Pontificate ==
Large churches were founded and built during Sylvester I's pontificate, including Basilica of St. John Lateran, Basilica of the Holy Cross in Jerusalem, Old St. Peter's Basilica and several churches built over the graves of martyrs.

One of the Symmachian forgeries, the Constitutum Silvestri, is an apocryphal alleged account of a Roman council, which partially builds on legends in the Acts of Sylvester which has been preserved in Greek, Syriac, and in Latin and the fictional stories of Sylvester's close relationship with the first Christian emperor. These also appear in the Donation of Constantine.

== Legacy ==
Long after his death, the figure of Sylvester was embroidered upon in a fictional account of his relationship to Constantine, which seemed to successfully support the later Gelasian doctrine of papal supremacy, papal auctoritas (authority) guiding imperial potestas (power), the doctrine that is embodied in the forged Donation of Constantine of the eighth century. In the fiction, of which an early version is represented in the early sixth-century Symmachean forgeries emanating from the curia of Pope Symmachus (died 514), the Emperor Constantine was cured of leprosy by the virtue of the baptismal water administered by Sylvester.

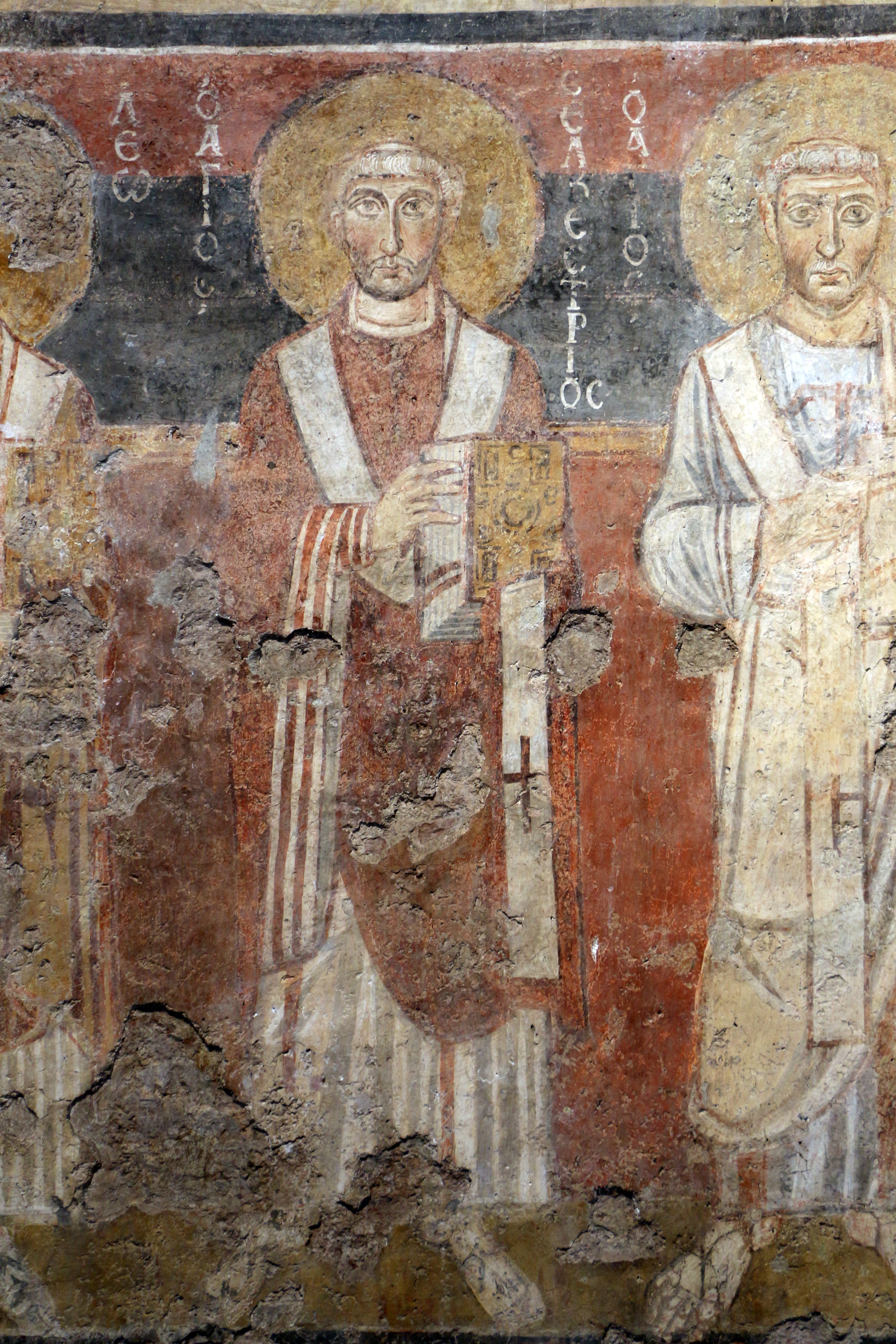
fresco of Saint Sylvester at Santa Maria Antiqua

The Emperor, abjectly grateful, not only confirmed the bishop of Rome as the primate above all other bishops, he resigned his imperial insignia and walked before Sylvester's horse holding the Pope's bridle as the papal groom. The Pope, in return, offered the crown of his own good will to Constantine, who abandoned Rome to the pope and took up residence in Constantinople. "The doctrine behind this charming story is a radical one," Norman F. Cantor observes: "The pope is supreme over all rulers, even the Roman emperor, who owes his crown to the pope and therefore may be deposed by papal decree". The legend gained wide circulation; Gregory of Tours referred to this political legend in his history of the Franks, written in the 580s.

Pope Sylvester II, himself a close associate of Otto III, Holy Roman Emperor, chose the name Sylvester in imitation of Sylvester I.

In the West, the liturgical feast of Saint Sylvester is on 31 December, the day of his burial in the Catacomb of Priscilla. This is now the last day in the year and, accordingly, in German-speaking countries and in some others close to them, New Year's Eve is known as Silvester. In some other countries, too, the day is usually referred to as Saint Sylvester's Day or the Feast of Saint Sylvester. In São Paulo, Brazil, a long-distance running event called the Saint Silvester Road Race occurs every year on 31 December.

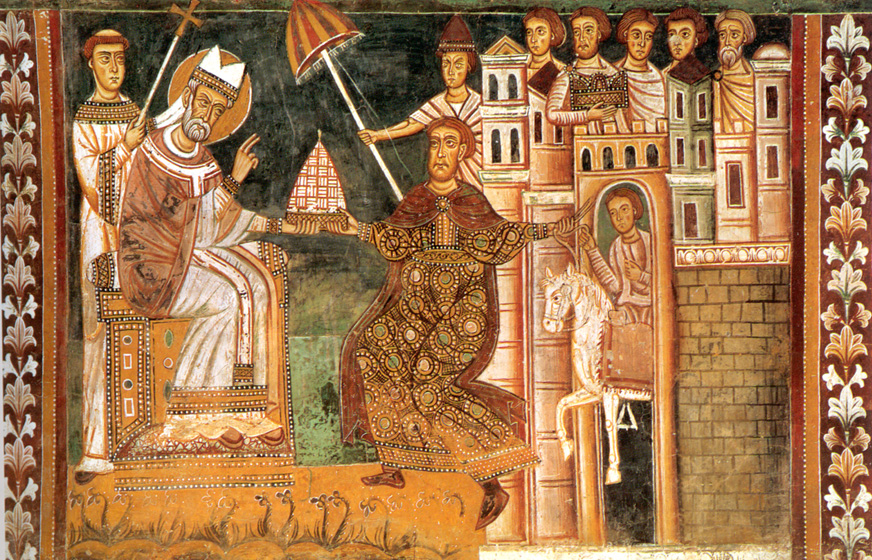
Pope Sylvester I and Constantine in a 1247 fresco

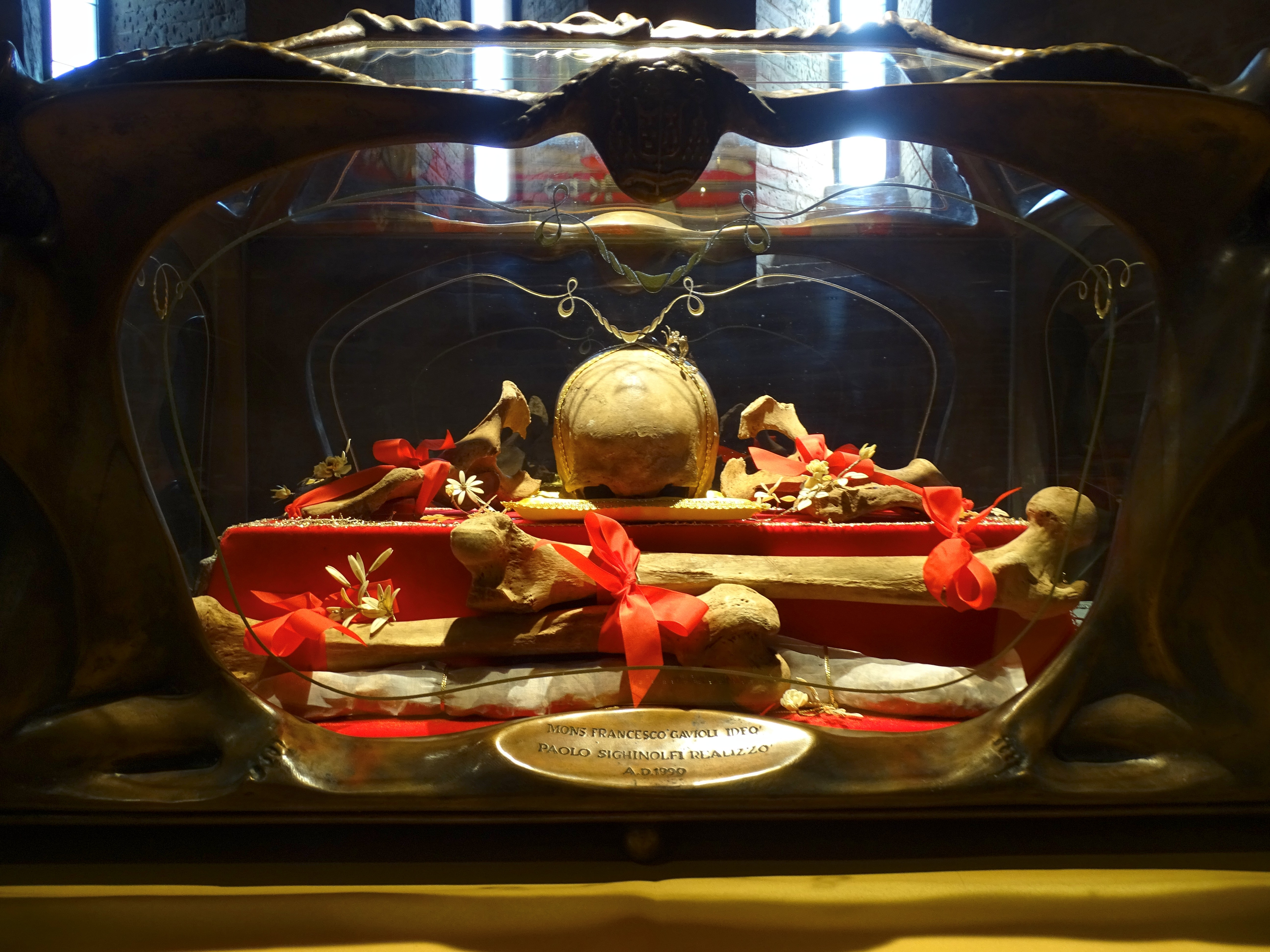
Relics of Saint Sylvester in the Abbey of Saint Sylvester in Nonantola

=== Legendary ===
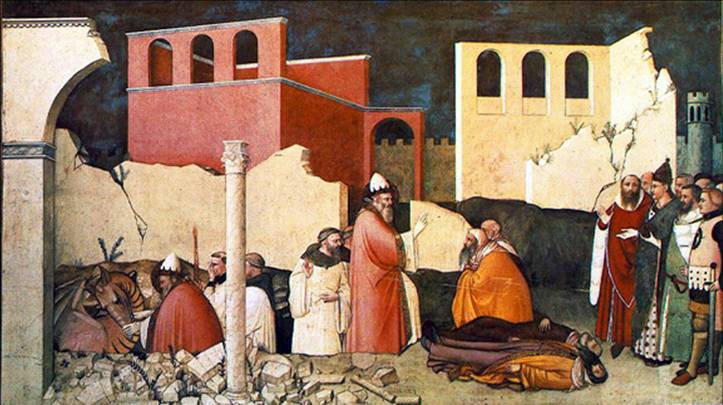
Sylvester slaying a dragon and resurrecting its victims in a fresco by Maso di Banco

The Donation of Constantine is a document fabricated in the second half of the eighth century, purporting to be a record by the Emperor himself of his conversion, the profession of his new faith, and the privileges he conferred on Pope Sylvester I, his clergy, and their successors. According to it, Pope Sylvester was offered the imperial crown, which, however, he refused.

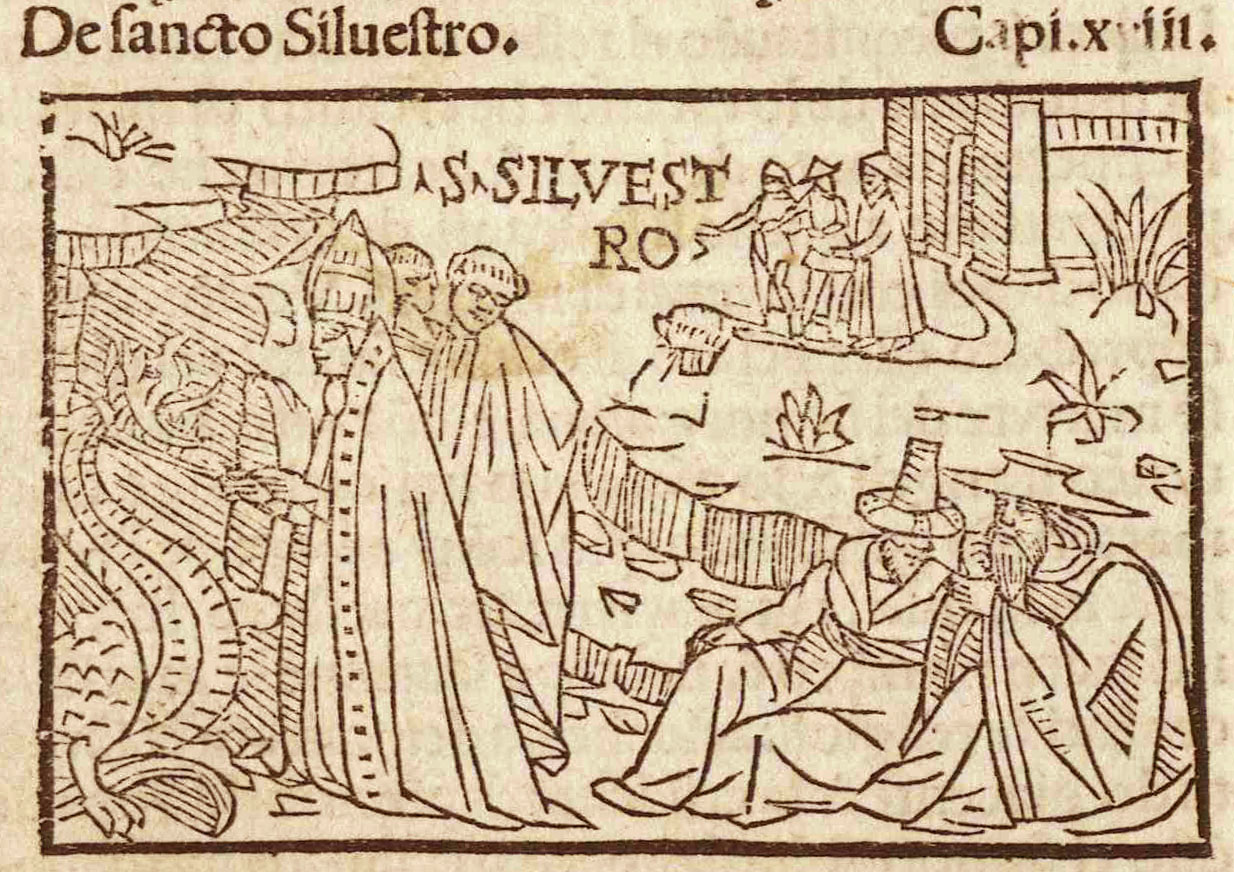
Sylvester in the Golden Legend (1497)

Lu Santu Papa Silvestru, a story in Giuseppe Pitrè's collection of Sicilian fables, recounts the legend as follows: Constantine the king wants to take a second wife, and asks Sylvester. Sylvester denies him permission, calling on heaven as witness; Constantine threatens him, and Sylvester, rather than give in, escapes into the woods. Not long after, Constantine falls ill; when he is desperate of ever regaining his health he has a dream which commands him to send for Sylvester. He obeys, and Sylvester receives Constantine's messengers in his cave and swiftly baptizes them, whereafter (having shown them several miracles) he is led back to Constantine, whom he baptizes also, and cures. In this story, Constantine and his entourage are not pagans but Jews.

Another legend has Sylvester slaying a dragon. He is often depicted with the dying beast.

== See also ==
- List of longest-reigning popes
- List of Catholic saints
- List of popes

== Literature ==
- Gisela Schmitt (1995). "Pope Sylvester I". In Bautz, Traugott (ed.). Biographisch-Bibliographisches Kirchenlexikon (BBKL) (in German). Vol. 10. Herzberg: Bautz. col. 338–341. ISBN 3-88309-062-X.
- Francesco Scorza Barcellona: Silvestro I, santo. In: Massimo Bray (ed.): Enciclopedia dei Papi. Rome 2000 (treccani.it)
- H.U. Instinsky: Silvester I. In: Josef Höfer, Karl Rahner (Hrsg.): Lexikon für Theologie und Kirche. 2. Auflage. Band 9. Herder, Freiburg im Breisgau 1964, Sp 757–758.
- Horst Fuhrmann (1991). "Konstantinische Schenkung". Lexikon des Mittelalters, V: Hiera-Mittel bis Lukanien (in German). Stuttgart and Weimar: J. B. Metzler. col. 1385–1387. ISBN 3-7608-8905-0.
- Wilhelm Pohlkamp (1995). "Silvester I., Papst (314–335)". Lexikon des Mittelalters, VII: Planudes bis Stadt (Rus’) (in German). Stuttgart and Weimar: J. B. Metzler. col. 1905–1908. ISBN 3-7608-8907-7.

Titles of the Great Christian Church
| Preceded by Miltiades | Bishop of Rome; Pope; 314–335 | Succeeded by Mark |
