= South Kensington (film) =

2001 Italian British romantic comedy directed by Carlo Vanzina

- Italian film poster
- Directed by: Carlo Vanzina
- Starring: Rupert Everett; Elle Macpherson; Judith Godrèche
- Music by: Flavio Ibba
- Distributed by: Medusa Film
- Release date: 17 December 2001 (Italy)
- Running time: 110 minutes
- Countries: Italy; United Kingdom
- Languages: English; Italian
- Budget: $7 million
- Box office: $1.1 million

South Kensington is a 2001 Italian-British romantic comedy film directed by Carlo Vanzina and starring Elle Macpherson, Rupert Everett, Judith Godrèche and Sienna Miller, in her first screen role.

== Cast ==
- Rupert Everett as Nick Brett
- Elle Macpherson as Camilla Fox
- Judith Godrèche as Susanna
- Enrico Brignano as Francesco
- Giampaolo Morelli as Antonio
- Deborah Moore as Direttrice Bulgari
- Naike Rivelli as Ilaria
- Jean-Claude Brialy as Ferdinando
- Sienna Miller as Sharon
- Nunzia Schiano as Antonio's mother
- Max Pisu as Massimo
- Vic Tablian as Mobarack
- Eleonora Benfatto as Fabiana
- Dado Coletti as Matteo

== Production ==
The film was shot on location in the actual South Kensington neighborhood of London in the summer of 2001.
