= Pseudo-Council of Sinuessa =

Forged 6th-century account of a papal trial

The pseudo-Council of Sinuessa was a purported gathering of bishops in 303 at Sinuessa, Italy, the purpose being a trial of Marcellinus on charges of apostasy. It is generally accepted that the gathering never took place and that the purported council documents were forged for political purposes in the 6th century during the schism between Symmachus and Laurentius, who both claimed the Holy See. The collection of forgeries, including the Council of Sinuessa, is collectively known as the Symmachian forgeries.

The Catholic Encyclopedia describes

an alleged synod of 300 bishops, which took place in 303 at Sinuessa (between Rome and Capua) in order to inquire into the accusation against Marcellinus that he had sacrificed at Diocletian's order. On the first two days Marcellinus had denied everything, but on the third day he admitted his lapse and repented; however the synod passed no sentence on him "quia prima sedes non judicatur a quoquam." When Diocletian learnt of the occurrence, he had the pope and several bishops of this synod executed (Hefele, "Konziliengeschichte", I, 2 Aufl. 143–145). The spuriousness of those acts is almost certain.

The Latin phrase "quia prima sedes non judicatur a quoquam" means roughly "for the occupant of the highest see cannot be judged by anyone", and the anecdote was produced in later centuries as evidence for the doctrine of papal supremacy.

== Forged account ==
A primary Latin account of the pseudo-Council of Sinuessa was collected by Giovanni Domenico Mansi in 1759. Döllinger summarizes the commonly-received account:

Marcellinus is conducted to the temple of Vesta, and there offers sacrifices, in the presence of a crowd of Christian spectators, to Hercules, Jupiter, and Saturn. At the news of this three hundred bishops leave their sees, and gather together to hold a council, first in a cavern near Sinuessa, but, as this would not hold more than fifty, afterwards in the town itself. Along with them were thirty Roman priests. Several priests and deacons are deposed, merely because they had gone away when they saw the pope enter the temple. Marcellinus, on the other hand, neither may nor can be judged, being supreme head of the church,— this conviction pervades the whole synod,— the pope can only be judged by himself. At first he attempts to palliate his act; but seventy-two witnesses make accusation against him. Thereupon he acknowledges his guilt, and himself pronounces his own deposition on the 23rd of August, 303. After this the bishops remain quietly together in Sinuessa, until Diocletian, upon receiving intelligence of this synod in Persia, sends an order for the execution of many of the three hundred, and this is carried into effect.

Döllinger dates the forgery to the reign of Symmachus, when Symmachus himself was being forced to answer to a synod convened by Theodoric, and himself was being threatened with deposition.

== Later uses and criticism ==
Robert Bellarmine seems to imply validity to the Council of Sinuessa, writing, "At the Council of Sinvessanus, the Fathers said: "The First See will be judged by no man." These words are related from that council by Pope Nicholas in his epistle to the Emperor Michael."

The story of Marcellinus and the Council of Sinuessa has been cited by later writers in support of papal supremacy.

Vice versa, one scholar writes that during the reign of Antipope Alexander V, Jean Gerson used the story "to prove the legitimacy of a council assembled without the authority of the pope."
