= Giovanni Domenico Mansi =

Italian prelate, theologian, scholar and historian

Most Reverend Giovanni Domenico Mansi
- Archbishop of Lucca
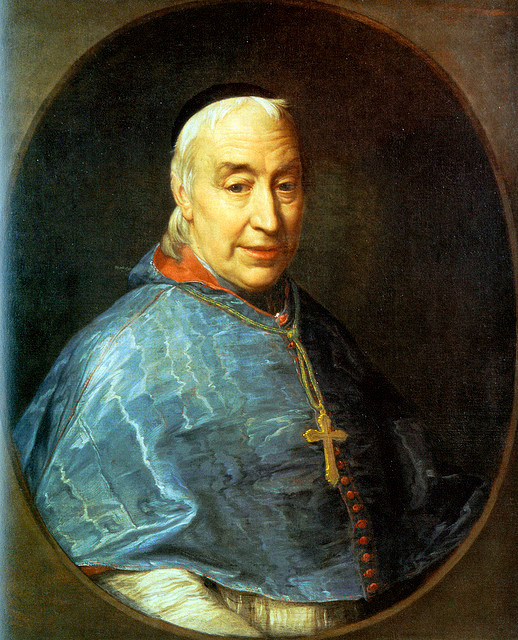
- Pompeo Batoni, Portrait of Archbishop Giovan Domenico mansi, 1764. Lucca, Museo Nazionale di Palazzo Mansi
- Diocese: Diocese of Lucca
- In office: 1764-1769

Orders
- Ordination: 1715
- Consecration: 24 April 1764 by Henry Benedict Stuart

Personal details
- Born: 16 February 1692 Lucca, Republic of Lucca
- Died: 27 September 1769 (aged 77) Lucca, Republic of Lucca
- Parents: Giuseppe Mansi and Maria Rosa Mansi (née Torre)
- Occupation: Theologian; Historian

Gian (Giovanni) Domenico Mansi (16 February 1692 – 27 September 1769) was an Italian prelate, theologian, scholar and historian, known for his massive works on the Church councils. (Note: His name is Anglicized in some source to John (Domenico) Mansi.)

== Biography ==
He was born at Lucca, of a patrician family, and died archbishop of that city. At the age of sixteen, he entered the Congregation of Clerics Regular of the Mother of God and made his profession in 1710. Except for some journeys made for purposes of study, his whole life, until his appointment as Archbishop of Lucca (1765), was spent in his religious home.

In 1758, after a sojourn at Rome, where he had been received by Cardinal Passionei, there was question of elevating him to the Sacred College, but his collaboration in an annotated edition of the famous Encyclopédie displeased Clement XIII. It should be remarked that the notes in this edition were intended to correct the text. Three years after his elevation to the episcopate, he was smitten with an attack of apoplexy which left him suffering, deprived of the power of motion, until his death.

His long career was filled chiefly with the re-editing of erudite ecclesiastical works with notes and complementary matter. His name appears on the title-pages of ninety folio volumes and numerous quartos. In the opinion of Auguste Boudinhon, the French priest and canonist who profiled Mansi for The Catholic Encyclopedia, he was "an indefatigable worker, widely read and thoroughly trained, his output was chiefly of a mechanical order, and unoriginal because hurried". His task was most often limited to inserting notes and documents in the work to be reproduced and sending the whole result to the printer, a process which resulted in numberless shortcomings.

The only work worth mentioning that is all Mansi's own is his Tractatus de casibus et censuris reservatis, published in 1724, which brought him into difficulties with the Index Librorum Prohibitorum. The rest are all annotated editions. In 1726, there was Jo. Burch. Menckenii De Charlataneria eruditorum declamationes duae cum notis variorum; from 1725 to 1738, an annotated Latin translation of the three works of Antoine Augustin Calmet—the Dictionnaire de la Bible, Prolégomènes et Dissertations, and Commentaire littéral.

The best-known publication of Mansi is his vast edition of the Councils, Sacrorum Conciliorum nova et amplissima collectio (31 vols., folio, Florence and Venice, 1758–98), which was stopped by lack of resources in the middle of the Council of Florence of 1438. The absence of an index renders it inconvenient, and in a critical point of view it leaves an immensity to be desired. Mansi saw only fourteen volumes of it published, the others were finished from his notes.

In 1748, he began to publish the first volume of a collection which was presented as a supplement to that of Coleti; the sixth and last volume of it appeared in 1752. The collection has been reprinted: in Paris by H. Welter, (1901–1927); and in Graz by the Akademische Druck- und Verlagsanstalt in 1960. The 1901 edition has been digitized by the University of Michigan Law Library.

== Selected list of editions and translations ==
- Augustin Calmet's 1720 dictionary as Dictionarium, Historicum, Criticum, Chronologicum, Geographicum, Biblicum, Latinis Litteris traditum a J. Dom. Mansi
- Mansi, Joannes Dominicus, ed. (1774). Sacrorum conciliorum nova et amplissima collectio. Vol. 19. Venetia: Antonius Zatta.
