= Pope Marcellinus =

Head of the Catholic Church from 296 to 304

Pope Saint Marcellinus
- Bishop of Rome
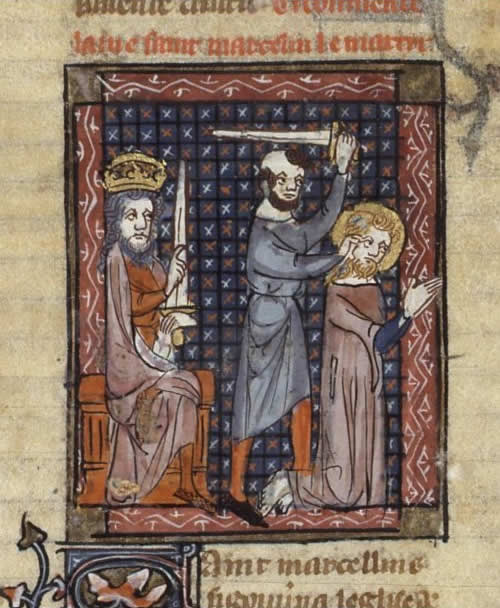
- Medieval miniature depicting the martyrdom of Saint Marcellinus
- Church: Catholic Church
- Papacy began: 30 June 296
- Papacy ended: 304
- Predecessor: Caius
- Successor: Marcellus I

Personal details
- Born: unknown date Rome, Italy, Roman Empire
- Died: 304 Rome, Italy, Roman Empire

Sainthood
- Feast day: 26 April (Catholic); 7 June (Serbian Orthodox)

Pope Marcellinus (sometimes anglicized to Marceline or Marcelline) was the bishop of Rome from 30 June 296 to his death in 304.

Some sources claim he may have renounced Christianity during Emperor Diocletian's persecution of Christians – which might explain why he is omitted from lists of martyrs. The claim is rejected by others, including Augustine of Hippo.

Marcellinus is today venerated as a saint in the Catholic Church and in the Serbian Orthodox Church.

== Pontificate ==
According to the Liberian Catalogue, Marcellinus was a Roman, the son of Proiectus or Projectus. He succeeded Caius as bishop of Rome on 30 June 296. Marcellinus' pontificate began at a time when Diocletian was Roman emperor, but had not yet started to persecute the Christians, and their membership grew. Caesar Galerius led the pagan movement against Christianity and aroused Diocletian against Christians in 302; first, Christian soldiers had to leave the army, later the Church's property was confiscated and their books destroyed. After two fires in Diocletian's palace, he took harder measures; Christians had to apostatize or be sentenced to death.

Marcellinus is not mentioned in the Martyrologium hieronymianum, or in the Depositio episcoporum, or in the Depositio martyrum. The Liber Pontificalis, based on the lost Acts of St Marcellinus, relates that during Diocletian’s persecution, Marcellinus offered incense to idols, but that, repenting shortly afterwards, he re-confessed the faith of Christ and suffered martyrdom with several companions. Other documents speak of his defection, and it is probably this lapse that explains the silence of the ancient liturgical calendars. In the beginning of the 5th century, Petilianus, the Donatist bishop of Cirta, says that Marcellinus and his priests had given up the holy books to the pagans during the persecution and offered incense to false gods. Augustine of Hippo denied the affair. The records of the pseudo-Council of Sinuessa, which were fabricated at the beginning of the 6th century, state that Marcellinus after his fall presented himself before a council, which refused to try him on the ground that prima sedes a nemine iudicatur ("The first See is judged by none").

According to the Liber Pontificalis, Marcellinus was buried on 26 April 304 in the cemetery of Priscilla, on the Via Salaria, 25 days after his martyrdom; the Liberian Catalogue gives as the date 25 October. The fact of the martyrdom, too, is not established with certainty. After a considerable interregnum, he was succeeded by Marcellus, with whom he has sometimes been confused.

== Veneration ==
Marcellinus was mentioned in the General Roman Calendar, into which a feast day in his honour jointly with that of Saint Cletus on 26 April was inserted in the thirteenth century. Because of the uncertainties regarding both, this joint feast was removed from that calendar in 1969. Saint Cletus is still listed in the Roman Martyrology under 26 April date; but Saint Marcellinus is no longer mentioned in that professedly incomplete list of recognized saints. Pope Marcellinus, along with Pope Marcellus, is commemorated in the Serbian Prologue of Ohrid on 7 June according to the Julian Calendar.

== See also ==
- List of Catholic saints
- List of popes

== Notes ==
Titles of the Great Christian Church
Preceded by Caius	Bishop of Rome; Pope; 296–304	Succeeded by Marcellus I
