= Edward Coletti =

American Poet and Painter

Ed Coletti is an American poet and painter. His most recent full-length collection of poetry is The Problem With Breathing (Edwin E. Smith Publishing. 2015).

== Life ==
Ed Coletti lives in Sonoma County, CA where he founded and curated the San Francisco Bay Area-wide SoCoCo reading series and the Poetry Azul series. He has also worked as a vocational rehabilitation counselor and as a business consultant.

Born in New York, Coletti moved to Santa Rosa, California after serving in the Vietnam War. He is a graduate of Georgetown University and completed a Masters in Creative Writing under Robert Creeley at San Francisco State University, San Francisco. Later he obtained a second master's degree in Management at Sonoma State University. He is the publisher of the small press Round Barn Press and writes for his blogs Ed Coletti's P3 and No Money in Poetry.

Besides his full-length collections and chapbooks of poetry, Coletti's work has appeared in two anthologies — Avanti Popolo, James Tracy, ed. (Manic D Press), and An Anthology of Ars Poetica, Jennifer Hill and Dan Waber, eds. (Paper Kite Press),

His work has appeared in the following journals: Light Year (Bits Press), ZYZZYVA, North American Review, Brooklyn Rail, Yale Journal for Humanities in Medicine, divide, (University of Colorado), Blueline, Stymie Magazine, Big Bridge, Spillway Magazine, Orbis (England), Jerry Jazz Musician, Tucumcari Literary Review, the Kickass Review, Parting Gifts Quadrant (Australia), Green's Magazine, Gryphon, The Pedestal, Italian American, Cyclamen and Swords (Israel), The New Verse News, and other journals and anthologies. He is indexed in Granger's American Poets.

Coletti writes, “ There was a time when I almost completely gave up writing. This was during the years 1973-1987. Then I reclaimed my soul and have written and published regularly again from 1987 to the present."

== Bibliography ==
- thawts : Selected Poems of Edward Coletti, PoetWorks Press (August 1, 2000, 2d edition 2006), ISBN 1-930293-12-7
- Between Trellis and Glass, dPress, 2006.
- Bringing Home the Bones, dPress, 2006.
- Quiet Now, Kapala Press, 2007.
- Carlos, Round Barn Press, 2008.
- Jazz Gods, Round Barn Press, 2010.
- When Hearts Outlive Minds, Conflux Press, 2011.
- Germs Viruses & Catechisms,Civil Defense Publications, 2013.
- The Problem With Breathing,Edwin E. Smith Publishing, 2015.
