= Dado Coletti =

Italian actor and television presenter

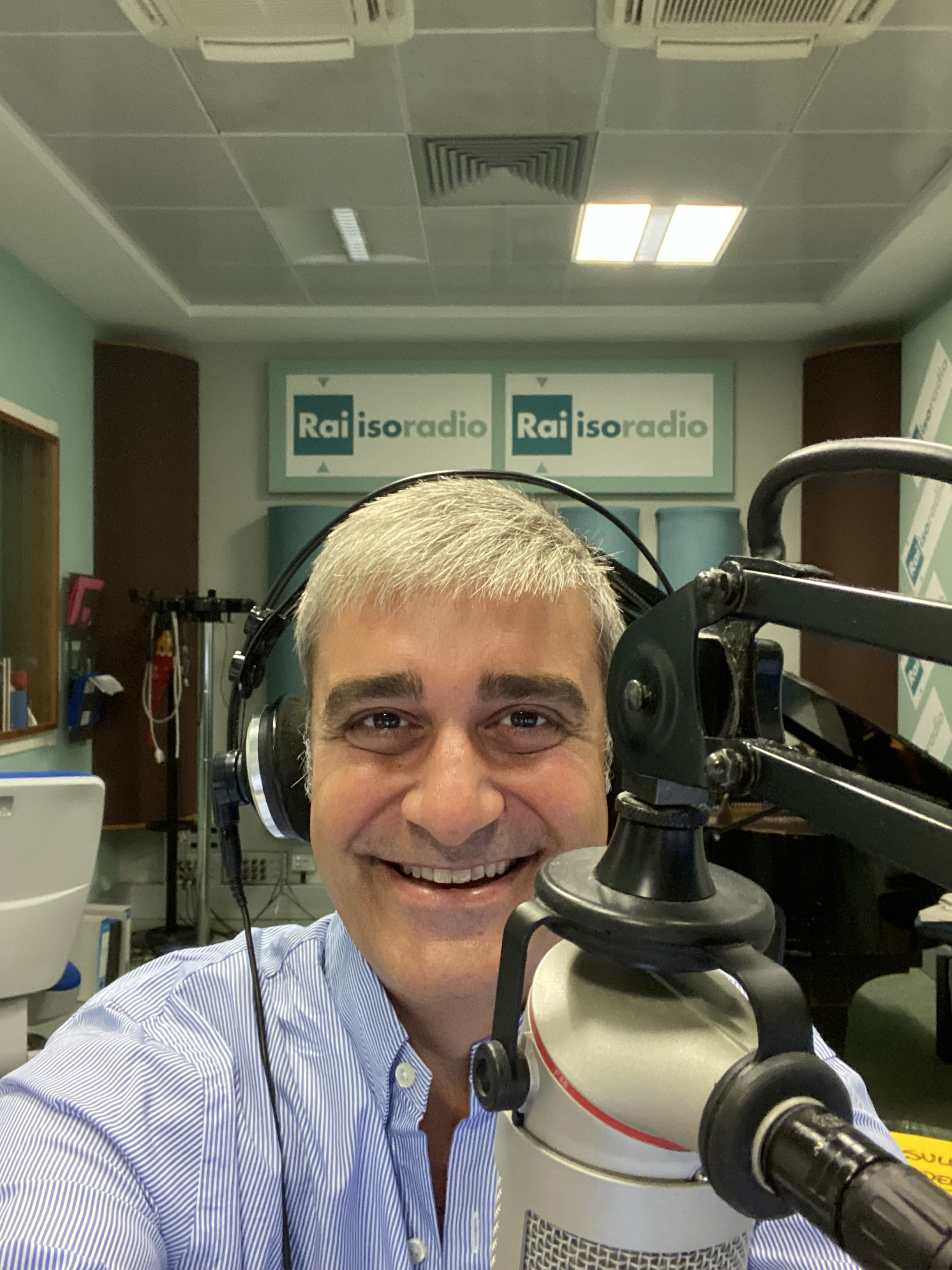
- Born: Riccardo Broccoletti; 27 August 1974 (age 51); Rome, Italy
- Occupations: Actor, radio and television host

Riccardo Broccoletti (born 27 August 1974), known by his stage name Dado Coletti, is an Italian actor and host of radio and television programs.

== Biography ==
Coletti was enrolled in the school of actor Enzo Garinei, made his debut in acting at the Teatro Sistina, and continued his studies while learning mime and dubbing.

He began his television career by working with children's programming. He worked for Disney Club from 1991 to 1994. and from 1995 to 1999, working during the latter period alongside Francesca Barberini. In 1999, he also hosted the RaiUno TV program Big! He hosted telethons in 1991, 1993 and 2006. Between 1993 and 1994, he hosted One for all and the children's news program Bignews. In 1995, he hosted Astronave Terra on RaiUno, and from that year through 1997 he presented four annual installments of the Disneyland program.

His first acting role in television came in 1999 with Death of a respectable girl, directed by Luigi Perelli. In the same year, he was one of the regular cast members of GNU, where he played the role of a TV producer addicted to new technologies. From 2000 to 2001, he hosted Glu Glu, a program of RaiSat Ragazzi, as well as some gameshows for Call Game of La7. Also in 2001, he was one of the competitors on Nientepopodimenoche, where he won the award for television presenters, and later that same year he was an external presenter of Scommettiamo che…? Between 2002 and 2004, he continued his work as presenter for Sereno variabile on RaiDue. In 2004, he was also co-host of Estate sul 2, the summer version of L'Italia sul 2, and participated in the live broadcast of the 19th World Youth Day in the presence of Pope John Paul II.

In 2005, he returned to television with the Rai 1 program Sabato, Domenica & la TV che bene alla salute where he replaced Corrado Tedeschi and Franco Di Mare. In 2009, he was the presenter of the program Festa italiana with Caterina Balivo.

Since March 2021, he has been a radio host on Rai Isoradio.

== Filmography ==
=== Cinema ===
- I laureati, directed by Leonardo Pieraccioni (1995)
- Intollerance, cortometraggio, directed by Paul Fenech (1996)
- Una notte normale, cortometraggio, directed by Elisabetta Villaggio (1997)
- South Kensington, directed by Carlo Vanzina (2001)
- La mia vita a stelle e strisce, directed by Massimo Ceccherini (2003)
- La brutta copia, directed by Massimo Ceccherini (2004)

=== Television ===
- Morte di una ragazza perbene, regia di Luigi Perelli – film TV (1999)
- 7 vite, serie TV, episodio 2x02 (2009)
- Buongiorno, mamma!, directed by Giulio Manfredonia – miniserie TV, episodio 1x06 (2021)

== Television ==
- Disney Club (Rai 1, 1991–1993, 1995–1999)
- Telethon 1991–1992 (Rai 1, 1991)
- Big! (Rai 1, 1993–1994)
- Telethon 1993–1994 (Rai 1, 1993)
- Uno per tutti (Rai 1, 1993–1994)
- Astronave Terra (Rai 1, 1995)
- Disneytime (Rai 1, 1995–1997)
- GNU (Rai 3, 1999)
- Glu Glu (RaiSat Ragazzi, 2000–2001)
- Call Game (La7, 2000–2001)
- Nientepopodimenoche (Rai 1, 2001)
- Scommettiamo che...? (Rai 1, 2001)
- Sereno variabile (Rai 2, 2002–2004)
- Estate sul 2 (Rai 2, 2004)
- Telethon 2006 2006 (Rai 1 e Rai 2, 2006)
- Sabato, domenica & la TV che fa bene alla salute (Rai 1, 2005)
- Festa italiana (Rai 1, 2009–2010)

== Radio ==
- Radio host on Rai Isoradio

== Dubbing ==
=== Movies ===
- Constantin Alexandrov in OSS 117: Cairo, Nest of Spies

=== TV series ===
- Mark Proksch in What We Do in the Shadows
- Ferry Öllinger in SOKO - Mysteries in the mountains

=== Video games ===
- Stellaris (1996) (Max)
