= Maso di Banco =

Italian painter (fl. 1335–1350)

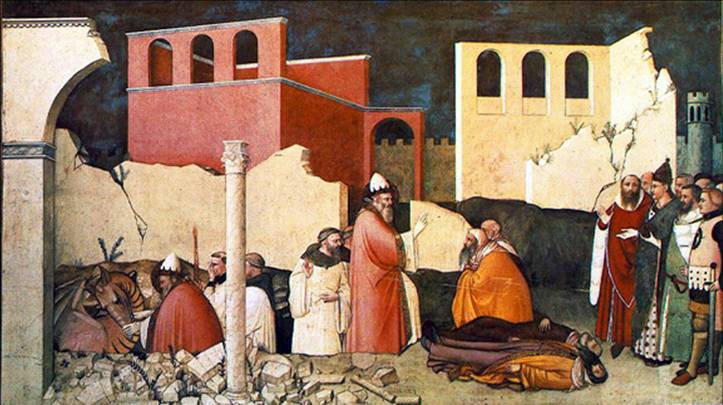
Pope Sylvester I turning away a dragon and reviving its victims, by Maso di Banco

Maso di Banco (working c 1335–1350) was an Italian painter of the 14th century, who worked in Florence, Italy. He and Taddeo Gaddi were the most prominent Florentine pupils of Giotto di Bondone, exploring the three-dimensional dramatic realism inaugurated by Giotto.

Maso's name and work are known to us from Lorenzo Ghiberti's autobiographical I Commentari, which identifies frescoes in the chapel of the Holy Confessors at Santa Croce, Florence as his chief work. The frescoes, not signed or dated but probably c 1340, represent scenes from the Life of St. Sylvester (Pope Sylvester I), the Last Judgment, and The Entombment.

His fresco of a particular judgment is in the Bardi banking family chapel of Santa Croce. It features Gualtiero de' Bardi pleading on behalf of his soul before Jesus Christ.

Nanni di Banco, a sculptor of the early 15th century, is not related to Maso.

== Selected works ==
- Triptych, Detroit Institute of Art
- Portable altarpiece depicting Madonna and Christ Child with Saints and Scenes From The Life of Christ at Brooklyn Museum
- Panel depicting The Coronation of the Virgin at the Budapest Museum of Fine Art
