= Symmachian forgeries =

6th-century forged religious documents

The Symmachian forgeries are a sheaf of forged documents produced in the curia of Pope Symmachus (498–514) in the beginning of the sixth century, in the same cycle that produced the Liber Pontificalis. (Note: Johann Joseph Ignaz von Döllinger, Die Papst-Fabeln des Mittelalters 1890:57ff; Louis Duchesne and Friedrich Maassen, Geschichte der Quellen und Literatur des Canonischen Rechts, vol. I 1870:798ff; W. T. Townsend, "The so-called Symmachian Forgeries", The Journal of Religion 13.2 (April 1933:165-174): Townsend made a plea that these "reconstructions of history" were not intended as forgeries and that critics "have not given their first readers due credit for a saving sense of humor" (p. 165, 167), and identifies subjects of criticism as the supporters of Theodoric, namely Cassiodorus, archpresbyter Liberius and Faustus.) In the context of the conflict between partisans of Symmachus and Antipope Laurentius the purpose of these libelli was to further papal pretensions of the independence of the bishops of Rome from criticisms and judgment of any ecclesiastical tribunal, putting them above law clerical and secular by supplying spurious documents supposedly of an earlier age.

The Catholic Encyclopedia states: "During the dispute between Pope St. Symmachus and the anti-pope Laurentius, the adherents of Symmachus drew up four apocryphal writings called the 'Symmachian Forgeries'. [...] The object of these forgeries was to produce alleged instances from earlier times to support the whole procedure of the adherents of Symmachus, and, in particular, the position that the Roman bishop could not be judged by any court composed of other bishops."

One of its modern editors, Louis Duchesne, divided those documents in two groups: a group produced in the heat of the conflict involving Symmachus, and a later group. Among writings to support Symmachus, Gesta de Xysti purgatione narrated a decision by Sixtus III, who cleared his name from defamation and permanently excommunicated the offender; Gesta de Polychronii episcopi Hierosolynitani accusatione concerned a purely apocryphal simonical Bishop of Jerusalem "Polychronius", who claimed Jerusalem as the first see and his supremacy over other bishops; Gesta Liberii papae concerned mass baptisms carried out by Pope Liberius during his exile from the seat of Peter; and Sinuessanae synodi gesta de Marcellino recounted the accusation brought against Pope Marcellinus, that in the company of the Emperor Diocletian he had offered incense to the pagan gods, making the point that when Marcellinus eventually confessed to the misdeed it was declared that the pope had condemned himself, since no one had ever judged the pontiff, because the first see will not be judged by anyone.

== Silvestri constitutum ==
The most important in this group of forgeries was Silvestri constitutum, a report of a fictitious synod convoked by Pope Sylvester, giving twenty promulgated canons, among which was a prohibition of bringing a solitary accusation upon an ecclesiastic of a degree higher than the accuser's: a bishop might only be accused by seventy-two, and a pope could not be accused by anyone. Silvestri constitutum also includes an early reference to the fable that Sylvester had cured Constantine the Great of leprosy with the waters of baptism, incurring the emperor's abject gratitude, which was elaborated and credited to the point that, in greeting Pope Stephen II in 753, Pepin the Short dismounted to lead the Pope's horse to his palace on foot, as Constantine would have done.

The second, somewhat later group centers on the figure of Sylvester, who accepts the decree of the First Council of Nicaea on the date of Easter. One of these forgeries reports a fictitious synod convoking 275 bishops in the Baths of Trajan; several canons exalt the position of the cleric.

== See also ==
- Donation of Constantine
