= Origins of the papal tiara =

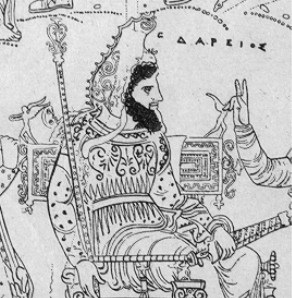
Achaemenid king Darius I with the typical Persian cap.

The origins of the papal tiara remain somewhat nebulous and clouded in mystery, first appearing in the Early Middle Ages, but developing a recognizable form in the High Middle Ages, after the Great Schism of 1054. The word tiara itself occurs in the classical annals to denote a Persian headdress, particularly that of the "great king". (Note: In a papal context, the first usage of the Greek word tiara is in the vita of Pope Paschal II (1099–1118) in the Liber Pontificalis.) A camelaucum which was similar in shape to papal tiaras, was part of court dress in Byzantium; it was also inspired by the Phrygian cap, or frigium. Given that other rituals associated with the papal coronation, notably the use of the sedia gestatoria, were copied from Byzantine and eastern imperial ceremonial, it is likely that the tiara is also of Byzantine origin.

== Camelauca ==
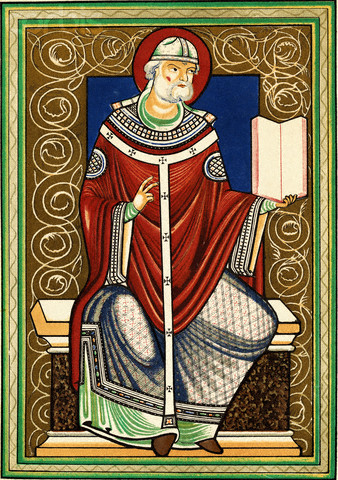
Pope Gregory the Great wearing the camelaucum.

A form of papal crown is first mentioned in the vita of Pope Constantine (8th century) contained in the Liber Pontificalis; there it is called a camelaucum, a folded cap of white linen that was part of Byzantine court dress. A contemporary depiction of Gregory the Great (died 604) shows such a cap. Coins of Pope Sergius III (904–11) and Pope Benedict VII (974–983) depict these popes wearing such a helmet-like-cap augmented at the base with a single coronet-like fillet.

It subsequently was mentioned (using the word phrygium) in the supposed Donation of Constantine which is a forgery embedded among the forged decretals in the early 9th century:

... the diadem, that is, the crown of our head, and at the same time the tiara and also the shoulder-band – that is, the strap that usually surrounds our imperial neck ...

The first use of the word tiara to indicate the papal headgear is in the life of Paschal II in the Liber Pontificalis and dates to the 12th century.

== Early tiara ==
Popes since ancient times had worn some sort of head covering. By the 9th century it would appear that this took the form of a helmet-shaped white head-cap. Pope Gregory the Great (r. 590–604) is shown in contemporary artwork wearing such a headpiece. When exactly it developed its first lower tiara is unclear, though the Catholic Encyclopaedia speculates that it was in or around the 10th century, perhaps to distinguish the ceremonial papal head covering from the ecclesiastical one, the mitre, which appeared around this era. The first explicit mention of the word tiara associated with the papacy appears in the account of the life of Pope Paschal II (r. 1099–1118) in the Liber Pontificalis.

A decorated circlet or ornamental band which may be the origins of the first tier of the tiara, is shown on coins of Pope Sergius III (r. 904–911) and Pope Benedict VII (r. 974–983).

The Extultet Barberini, dated around 1087, shows an early version of the tiara, with lower band and a crosshatch pattern on the conical tiara. A similar tiara is shown on Innocent III in a fresco at Sacro Speco from about 1219 and on a mosaic from Old Saint Peter's, now in the Museo di Roma. A similar tiara, conical and with only one crown at the base, is seen worn by pope Clement IV in frescoes from the 13th century in Pernes-les-Fontaines, France and at his tomb in Viterbo. Also in Viterbo is the tomb of Hadrian V by Arnolfo di Cambio, with a similar tiara. The tomb of Honorius IV in Santa Maria in Ara Coeli also presents the tiara with one crown with gems at the bottom and topped with a large gem. The tomb of Gregory X (1271–1276) shows him wearing a similar tiara, with the base a full crown and a textured and decorated conical body. A fresco by Buffalmacco in the Arezzo cathedral depicts Gregory X wearing a similar tiara with black lappets.

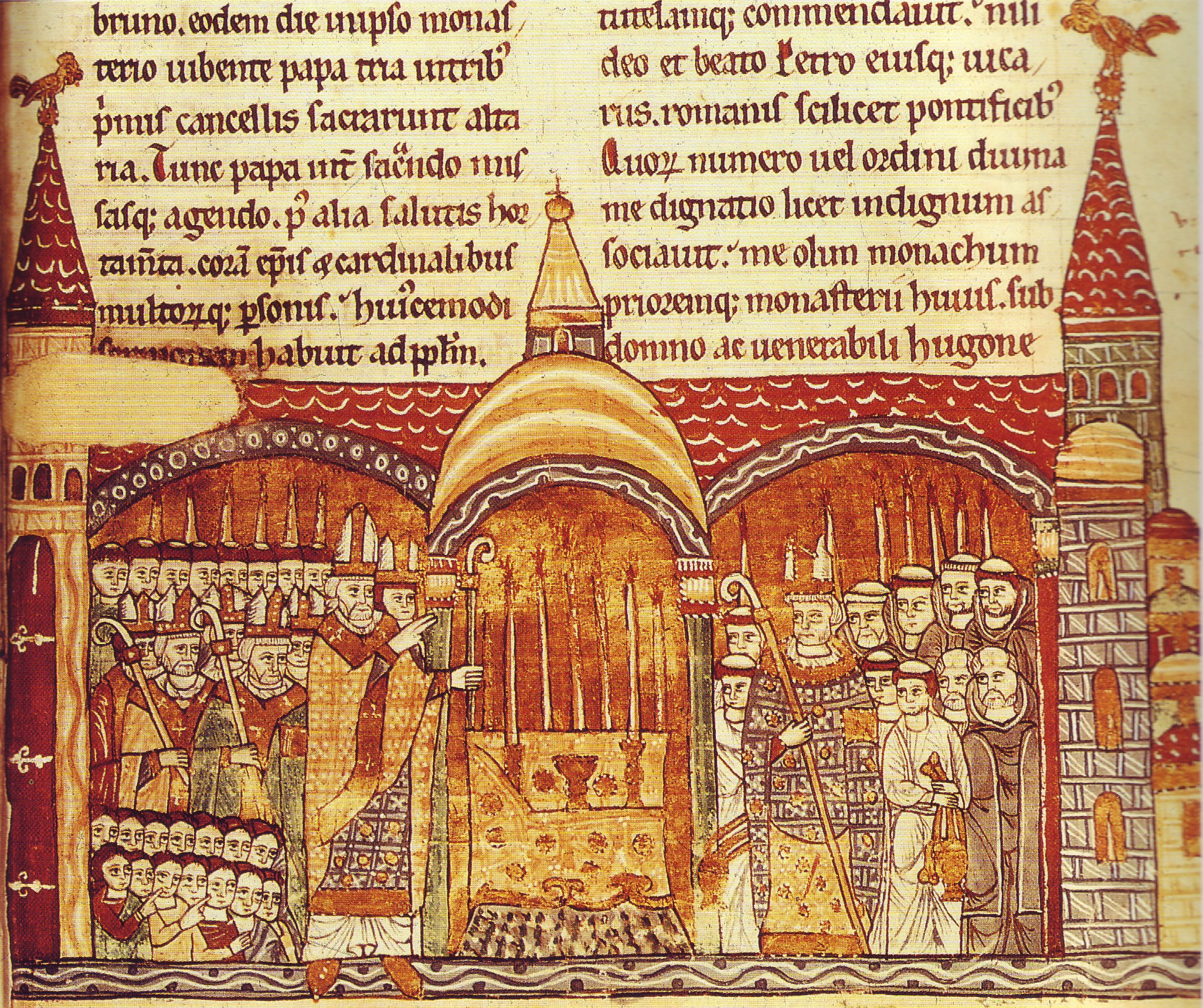
Pope Urban II shown wearing a tall tiara, while other bishops are shown wearing a mitre. From the codex BnF MS lat. 17716, f.91r, end of the 12th century and beginning of the 13th century.

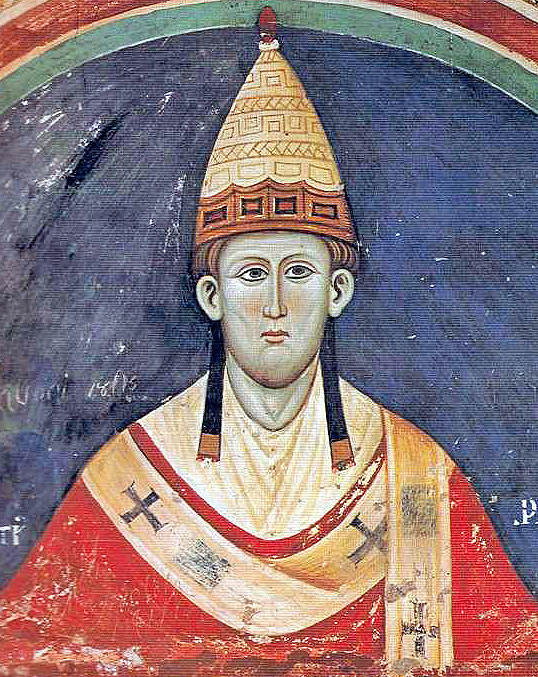
Pope Innocent III (1198–1216) in early papal tiara, Fresco at the cloister Sacro Speco, about 1219.

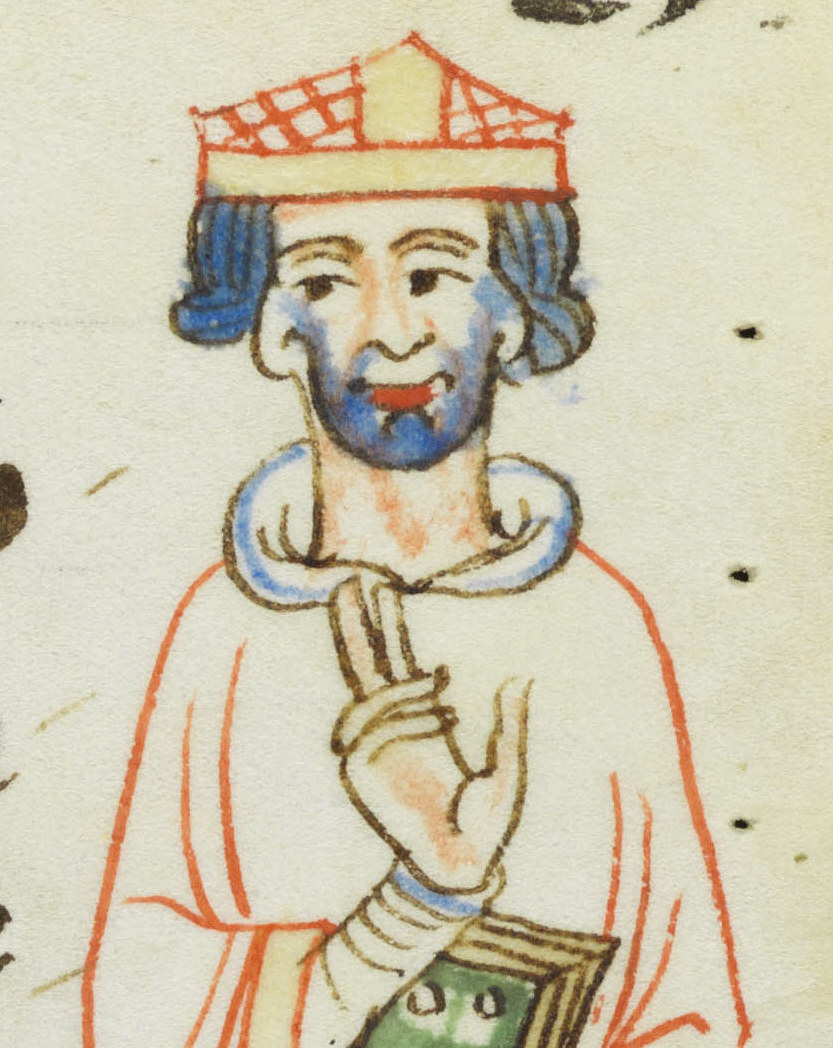
Honorius III in a 13th-century illustration

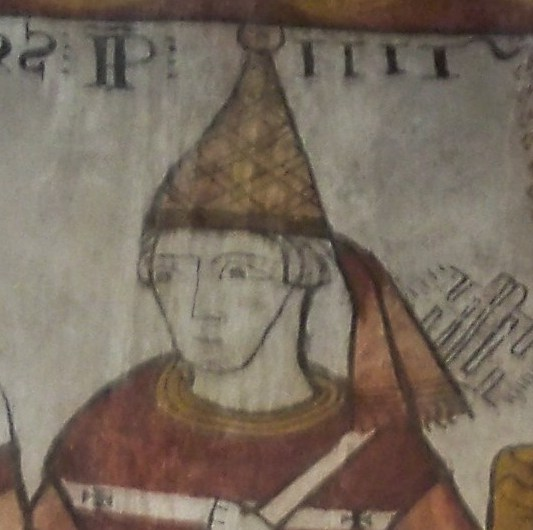
Clement IV in a 13th century fresco in Pernes-les-Fontaines, France

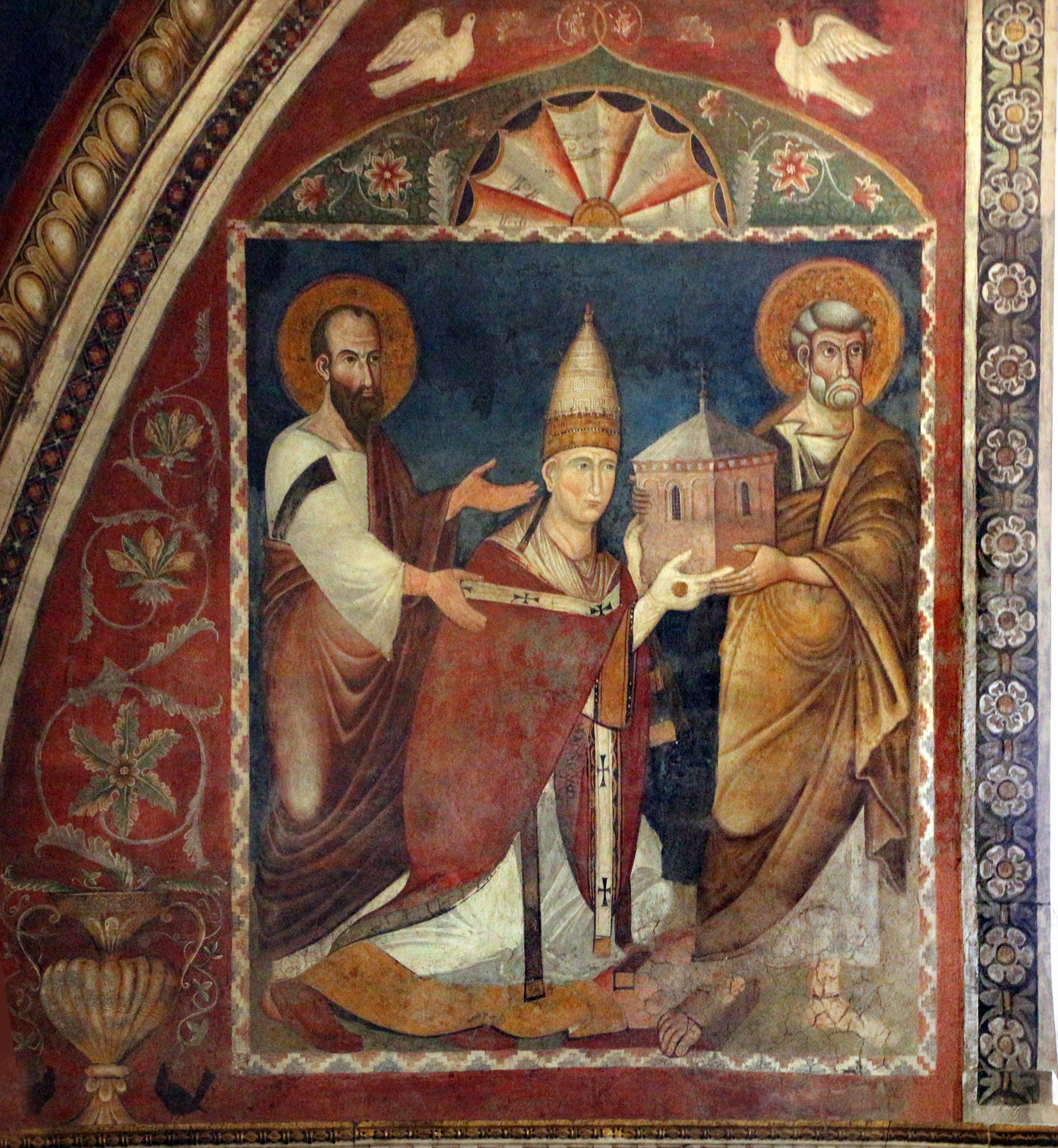
XIII century fresco in the Sancta Sanctorum (Lateran, Rome) depicting Nicholas III offering the church to Christ

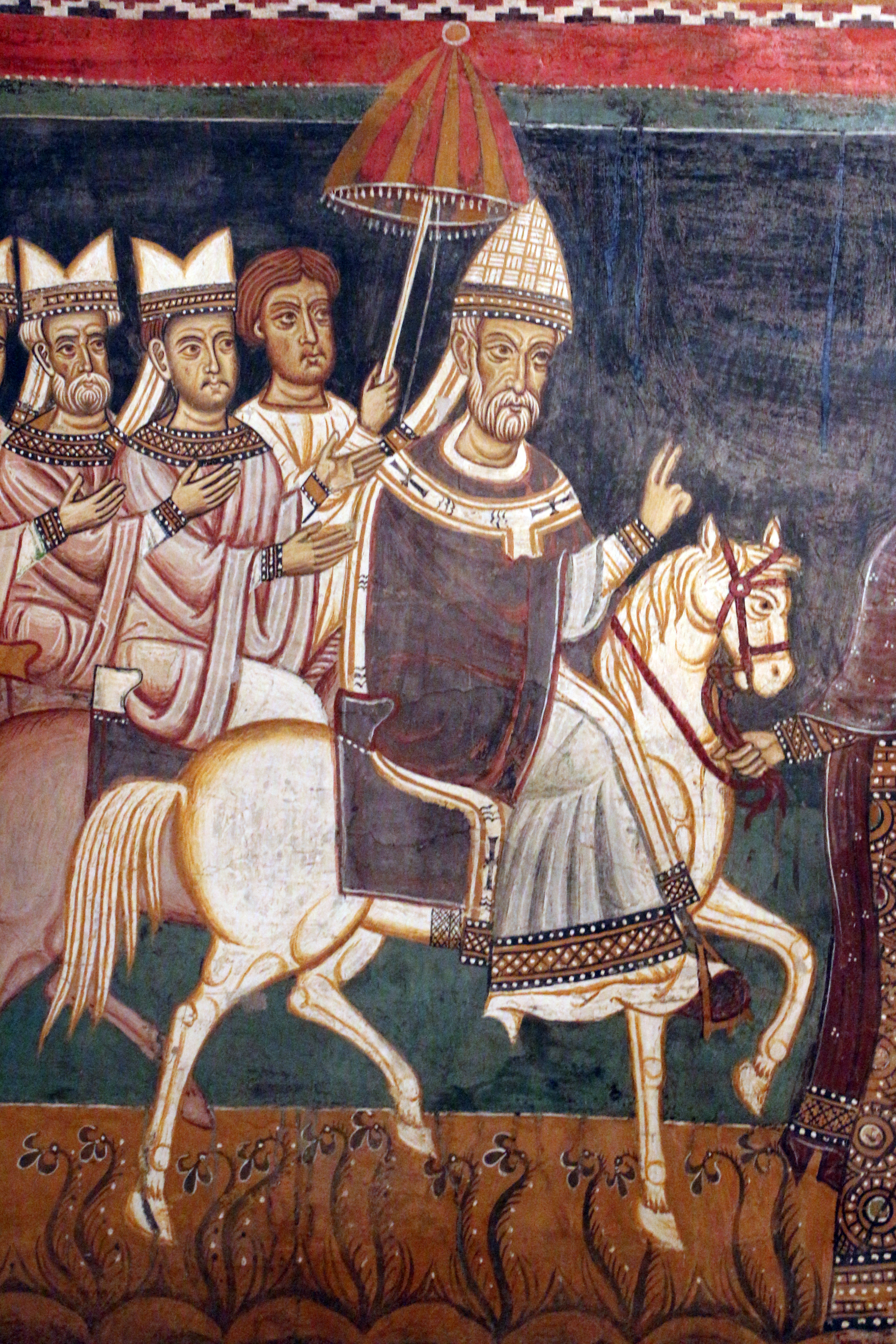
Fresco from 1246 depicting pope Silvester wearing the tiara, Santi Quattro Coronati

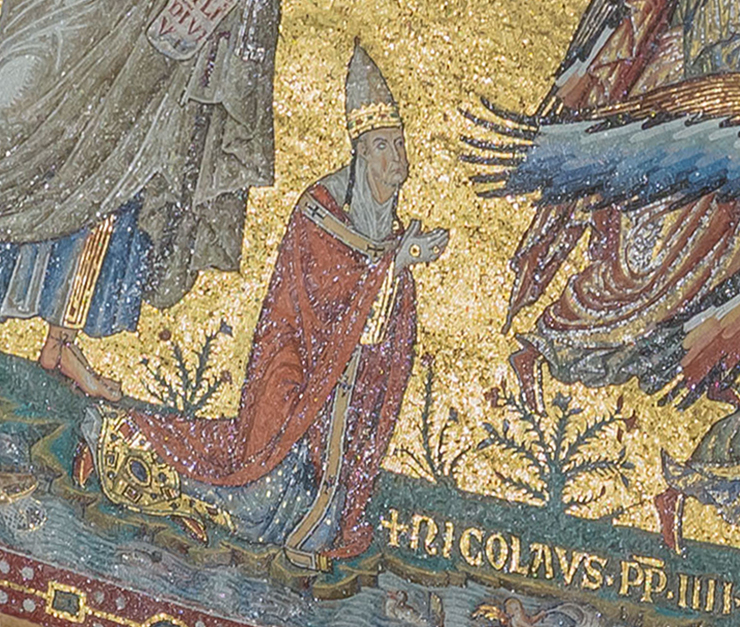
Portrait of Nicolas IV, apse of Santa Maria Maggiore church in Rome, 1245

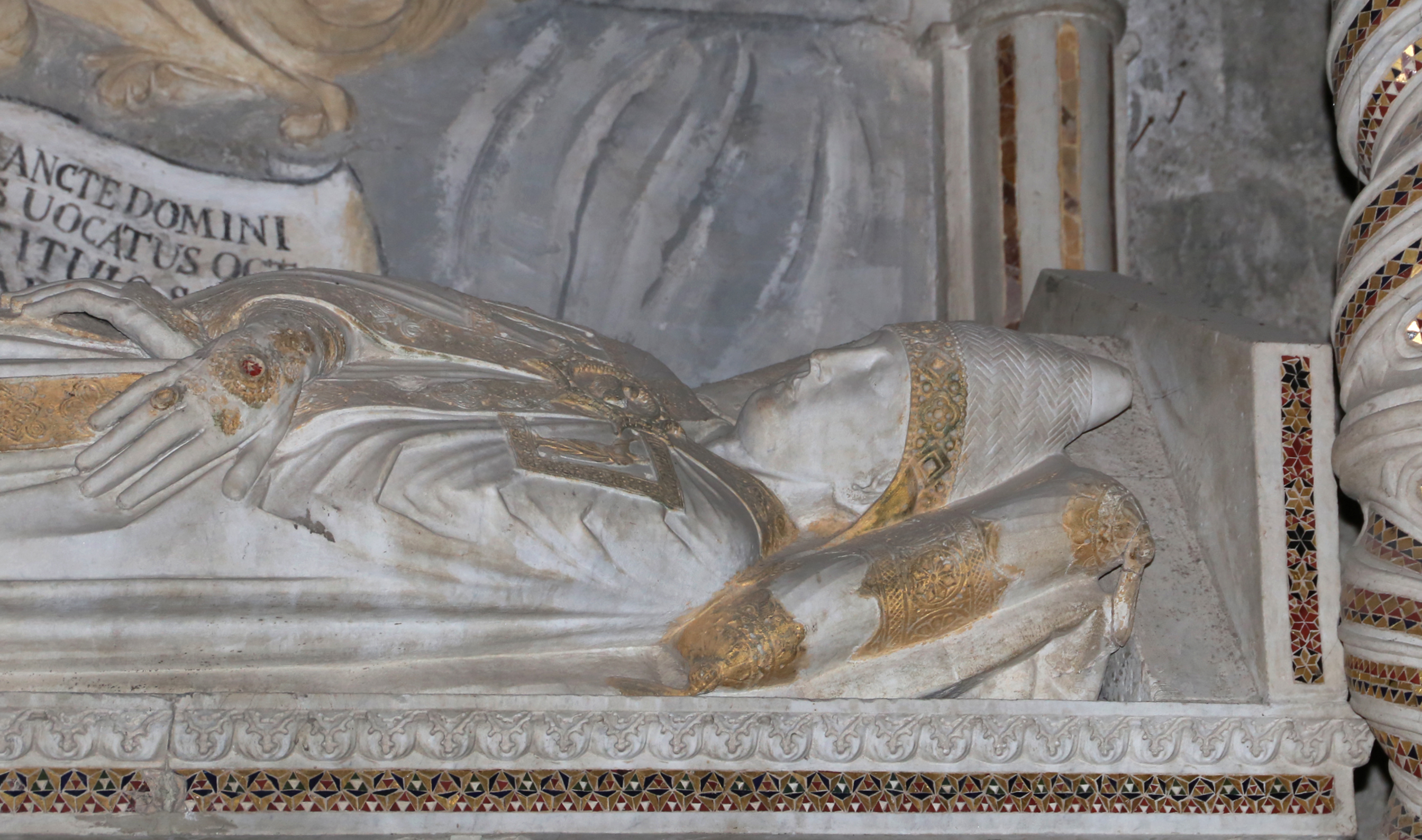
The tomb of Hadrian V in Viterbo, post 1276

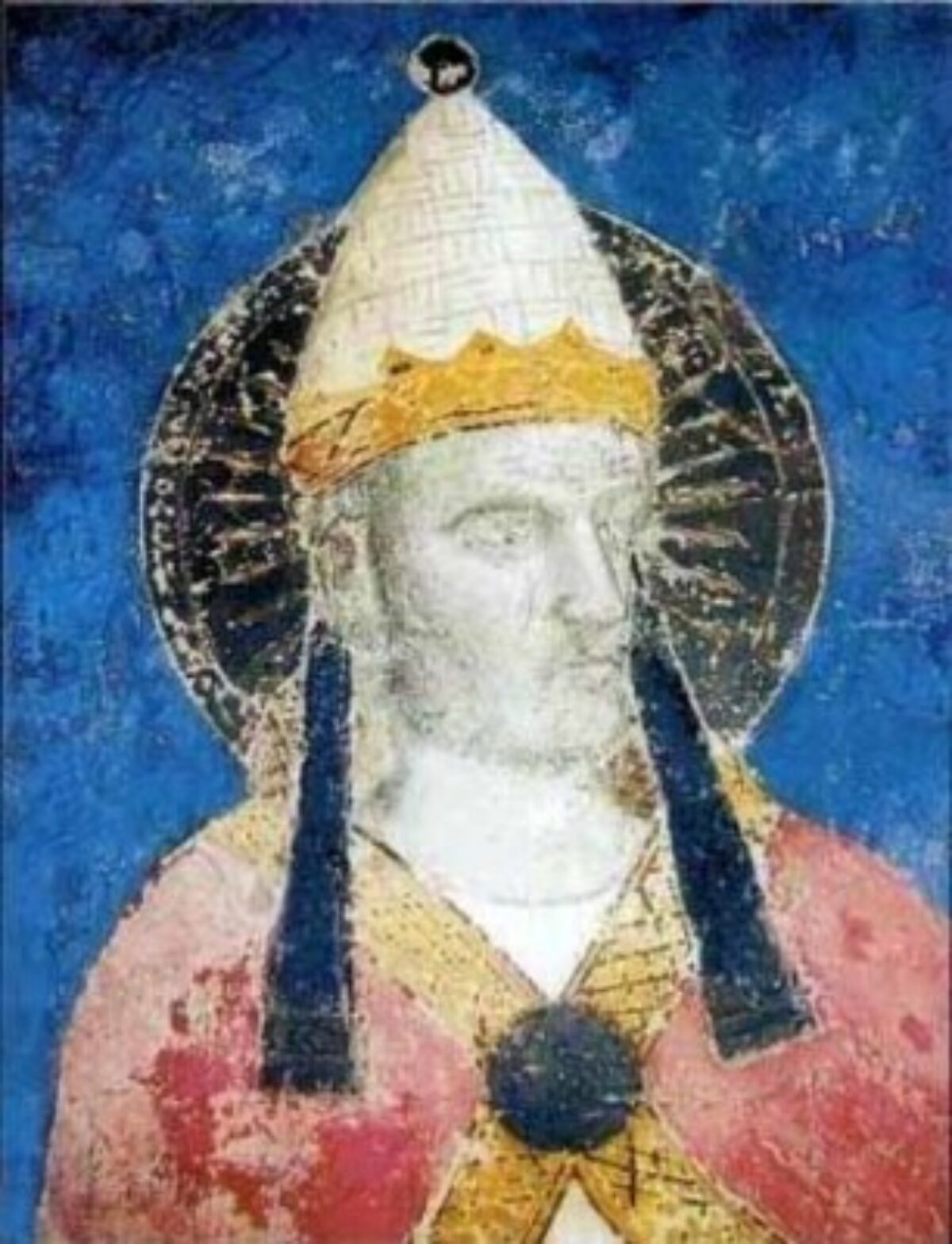
Fresco by Buonamico Buffalmacco (c. 1315–1336)

== Second tier ==
Pope Nicholas I is thought to have been the first to unite the princely crown with the white headcovering. However the common belief that Pope Boniface VIII (r. 1294–1303) around 1300 added the second crown, is disputed. While an inventory of the papal treasures in 1295 suggests that the tiara had at that stage only one tier, Pope Innocent III (r. 1198–1216) is represented wearing a two-tiered crown in a painting that predates Boniface. Innocent III is represented with an early tiara (with only one crown) in a fresco at Sacro Speco and on a mosaic from Old Saint Peter's, now in the Museo di Roma. What is certain, from statues of Boniface made during his lifetime, is that he wore a two-tiered tiara, so the two-tiered tiara originated no later than his reign. Two of these statues of Pope Boniface are in the crypt of St. Peter's Basilica. Why the second tiara was added is not formally stated in any documents, but historians such as James-Charles Noonan suggest that it may have been symbolic of growing papal claims to both temporal and spiritual power, the two tiers in the papal crown contrasting with the single tier of standard monarchical crowns.

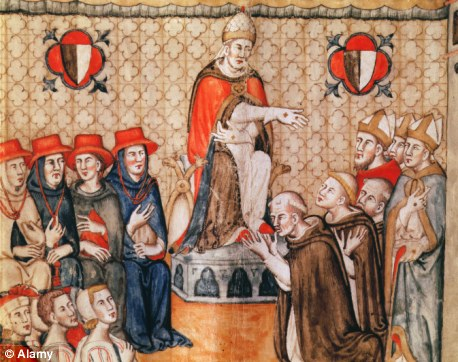
Pope Benedict XI in a miniature from 1343

== Third tier ==
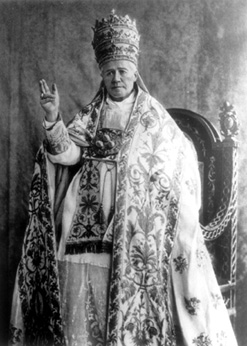
Pius X (1903–1914) in a three-tiered tiara

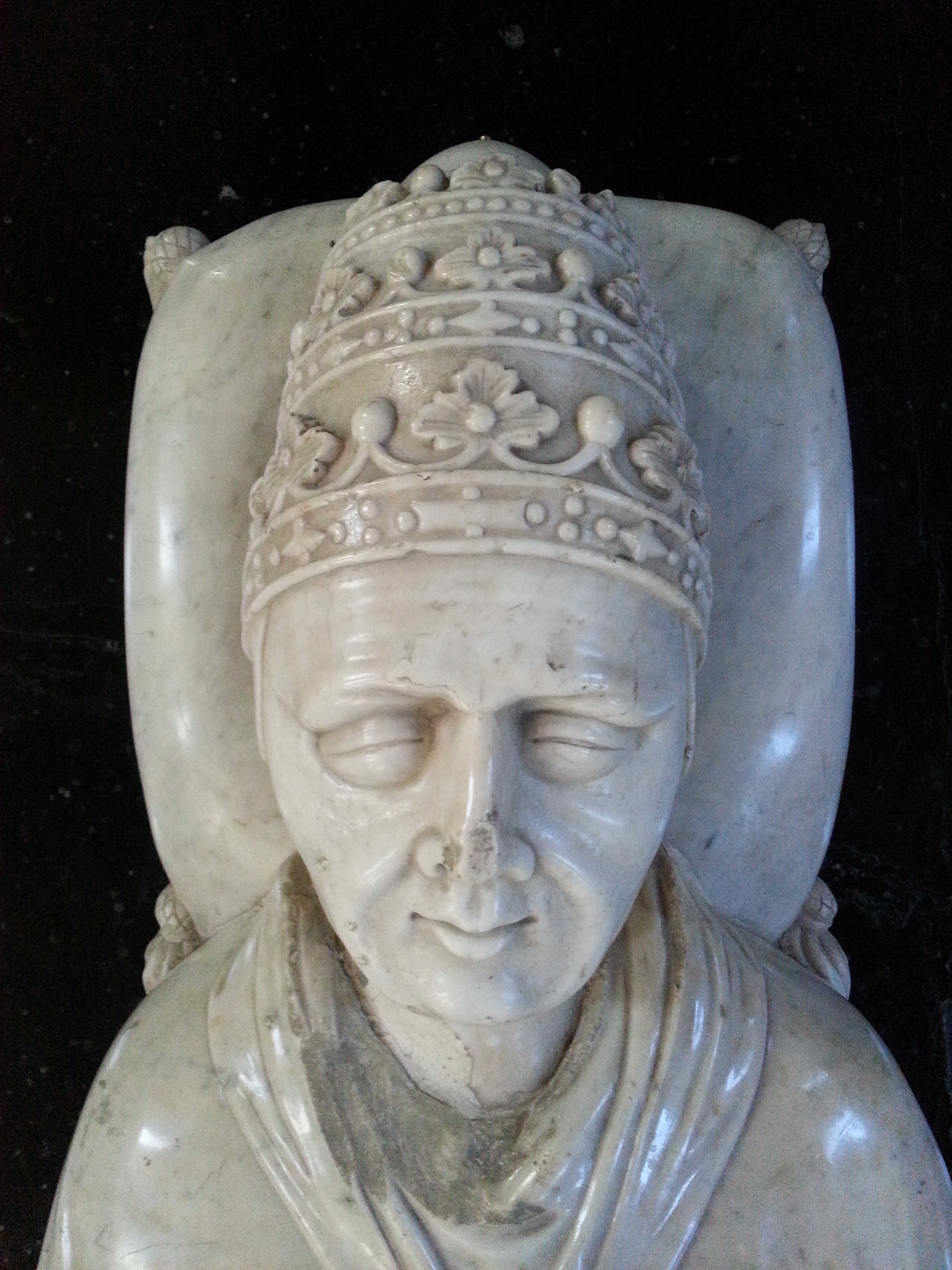
The three-tiered tiara of Pope Clement VI (1342–1352) depicted in his tomb, constructed in 1346

The first notice of three crowns appears in an inventory of the papal treasures of the year 1315 or 1316. An effigy of Pope Benedict XII, which is on display in Avignon shows him wearing a two-tiered tiara. The tomb of Clement VI, built 1342–1346, shows his tiara with three tiers.

The lappets (two decorated strips of cloth which hang at the back of a tiara) are shown in paintings from the 13th century but may well have existed before then.

== Sources ==
- New Advent Catholic Encyclopaedia
- Noonan, James-Charles. (1996). The Church Visible: The Ceremonial Life and Protocol of the Roman Catholic Church. New York: Viking. ISBN 0-670-86745-4.
