= Pontifex (disambiguation) =

A pontifex was an official in a Roman priesthood of the pre-Christian era, headed by the Pontifex Maximus, and now one of the titles of the Pope.

For people bearing the modern surname Pontifex, see Pontifex (surname).

Pontifex may also refer to:

- Pontifex (project), the Planning Of Non-specific Transportation by an Intelligent Fleet EXpert European project
- Quintus Mucius Scaevola Pontifex (died 82 BC), politician of the Roman Republic
- Romanus Pontifex, papal bull of 1455, granting nations and explorers rights over newly discovered lands
- Pontifex, codename for the Solitaire encryption algorithm in the 1999 novel Cryptonomicon by Neal Stephenson
- Valentine Pontifex, 1983 novel by Robert Silverberg
- Pontifex (genus), a group of amoeboid organisms

== See also ==
- Pontiff
