= Papacy in early Christianity =

History of papacy from 30 AD to 313

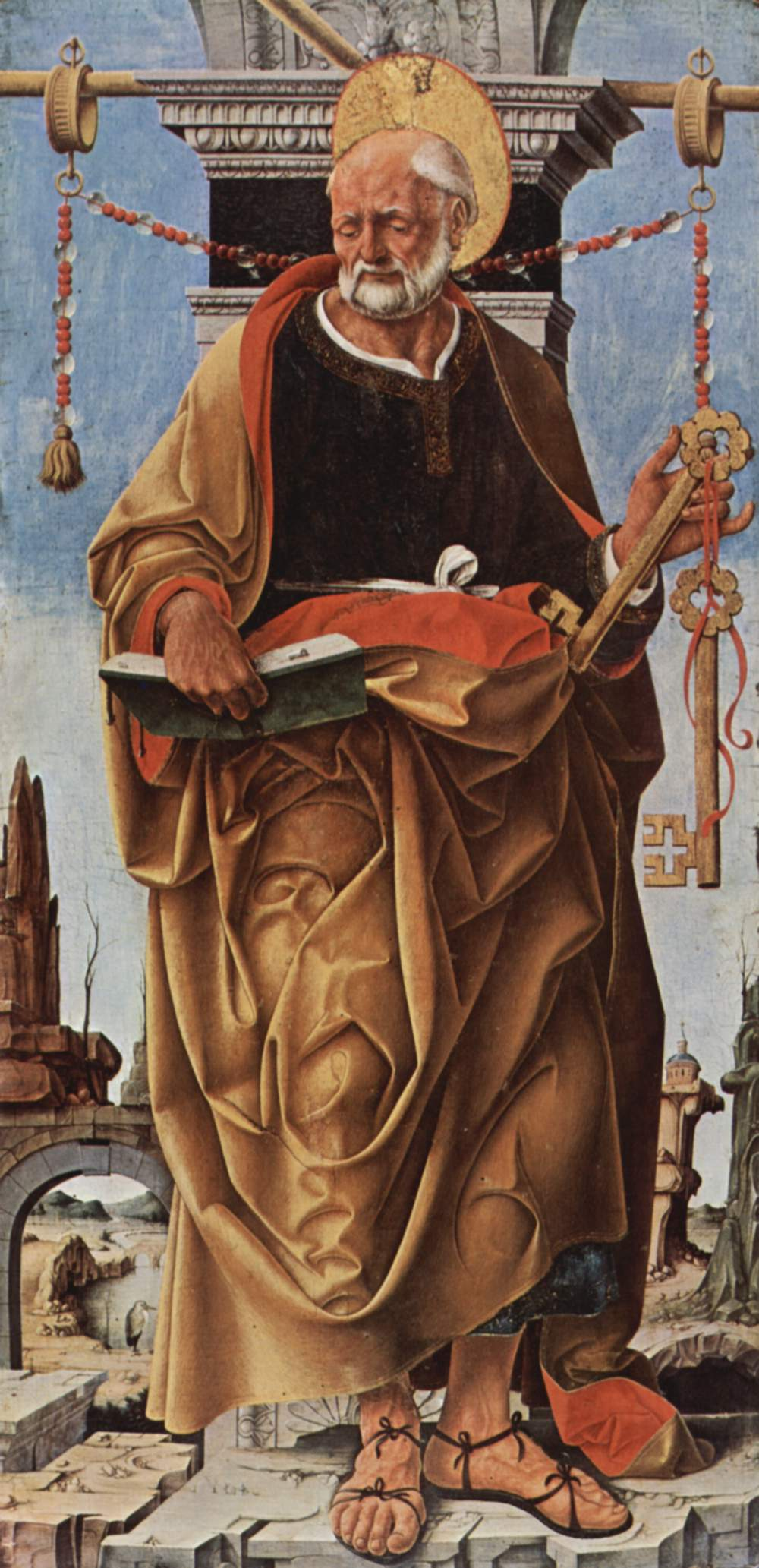
Saint Peter, the first Pope, with the Keys of Heaven. By Francesco del Cossa, currently at the Pinacoteca di Brera.

Papacy in early Christianity was the period in papal history between 30 AD, when according to Catholic doctrine, Saint Peter effectively assumed his pastoral role as the Visible Head of the Church, until the pontificate of Miltiades, in 313, when Peace in the Church began.

== Overview ==
The life and actions of many early popes remain shrouded in mystery, such as St. Linus, said to have been the second pope, whose life is unknown and his attitudes as Bishop of Rome uncertain. The controversy among historians about the role of the early popes is remarkable, while some claim that they did not in fact possess primatial rights and privileges, not accepting several pivotal events in papal history, others contrarily claim that papal primacy can be identified in these centuries. The most accepted view among historians, regardless of religious orientation, is that the Roman Church possessed a prominence in the litigation of the universal Church in this period, and mainly, that this role changed and became more pronounced in subsequent centuries.

In this period of Christianity, new schisms and heresies often arose, which the Bishops of Rome tried to solve, although factors such as geographical distance limited their authority. Besides the Roman Church, the Churches of Alexandria and Antioch were also important centers for Christianity, and their bishops had jurisdiction over certain territories. Many historians have suggested that their special powers came from the fact that all three communities were headed by St. Peter (Rome and Antioch were, according to Holy Scripture and Tradition, founded by Peter and in Alexandria by his disciple St. Mark).

The books of the lives of the saints of Rome state that due to the persecution of the Roman Empire, all the Popes of that time were martyred, although there is uncertainty about the death of many Bishops of Rome, whose accounts of martyrdom emerged long after their death, in the likes of a legend, such as St. Clement I, who lived in the late 1st century, but whose story of martyrdom goes back only to the 4th century.

The end of the early papacy is commonly placed in late antiquity, in 313, when Emperor Constantine I published the Edict of Milan in which he granted freedom to all religions, beginning the Peace in the Church. Constantine began to interfere in many ecclesiastical matters, giving rise to Caesaropapism, and a relationship of "difficult entanglement between Church and State." This caused the beginning of the period of interaction between the popes, the Roman, and the Byzantine emperors.

== Controversies over historical events ==
=== Martyrdom of Peter and Paul in Rome ===
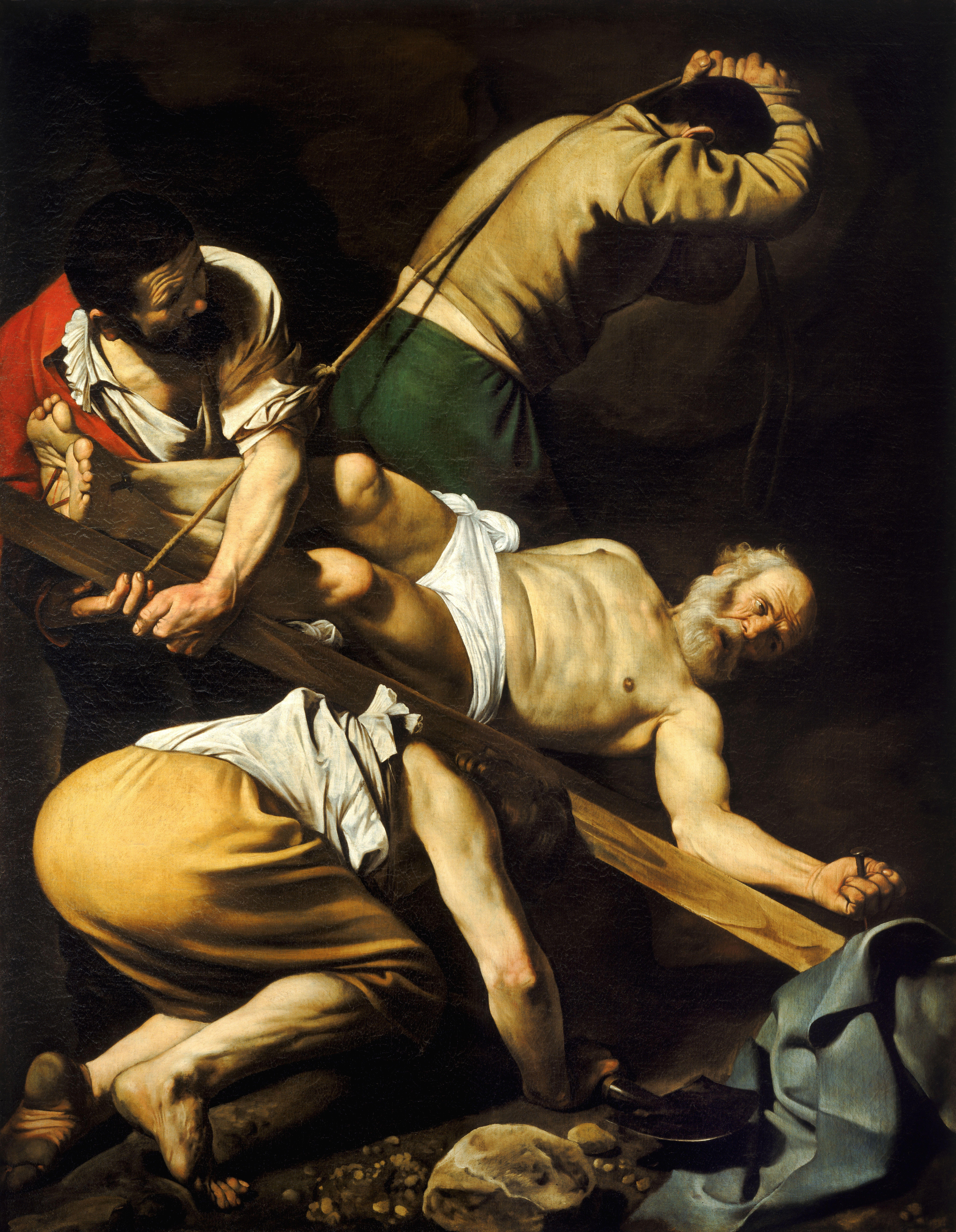
Crucifixion of St. Peter by Caravaggio (Santa Maria del Popolo, Rome, 1600).

Some historians have argued that Peter never in fact went to Rome. This thesis was most prominently advocated by Ferdinand Christian Baur of the Tübingen School. Others, such as Heinrich Dressel in 1872, stated that Peter would have been buried in Alexandria, Egypt, or Antioch, arguing that the notion that Peter founded the church of Rome cannot be traced back before the third century.

However, Clement of Rome wrote in a letter to the Corinthians, c. 96 about the persecution of Christians in Rome, reporting that the apostles Peter and Paul were martyred in the imperial capital. St. Ignatius of Antioch wrote soon after Clement, from the city of Smyrna, and in his letter to the Romans, reported that they were to lead it as Peter and Paul did. Between the years 166 and 176, the bishop of Corinth, Dionysius, reported that Paul and Peter preached the Gospel in Rome. Later the writings of Irenaeus, from around 180 AD, indicate a strong belief that Peter "founded and organized" the Church in Rome. Given this and other evidence, many scholars conclude that Peter was indeed martyred in Rome during the reign of Nero. Lutheran historian Adolf von Harnack stated that the previous mainly Protestant theses were biased and that they undermined the study on St. Peter's life in Rome.

=== Episcopal organization of Rome ===
Initially, the terms "presbyters" and "bishops" were used for the same people, who acted as leaders of the local church, being subject to an apostle. Thus, many historians argue that in the late 1st century, and until the mid 2nd century, the Roman Church did not have a single bishop as head of the local church, but rather had a collegiate form of pastoral leadership; the men who are listed as Peter's immediate successors were possibly prominent individuals in the Roman community, but not single bishops, and that therefore, originally, papal ministry did not exist.

However, other scholars and historians disagree, arguing that the apostles designated their successors in leading local churches, which originally were also considered "apostles", citing for example Paul of Tarsus' pastoral charge to Titus and Timothy in the Acts of the Apostles. But by the end of the 1st century this title was reserved for the twelve disciples of Jesus, and the term "bishop" was applied to those who were previously called apostles.

A few years later, Clement, c. 96, while the Apostle John was still alive, stated that the other apostles left "instructions to the effect that after their death other proven men should succeed them in their ministry." The strongest argument to this effect is the historical records of St. Ignatius, Bishop of Antioch, who lived with the Apostles John and Peter, and who attested to the linear succession of bishops from the time of the apostles, soon after their death, in his church, and Smyrna. Soon after, Irenaeus in the second century highlighted the validity of a line of bishops from the time of St. Peter to his contemporary, Pope Victor I, enumerating them. The same argument is repeated by all the major ancient theologians and historians, such as Sextus Julius Africanus, Tertullian, Eusebius, and Jerome.

=== Exercise of papal primacy ===
The controversy about the papal history of this period stems from historians having different religious views; Catholic, Orthodox, Protestant, or non-Christian. Some historians, especially Protestants, claim, for example, that in early Christianity the local churches were governed independently by their own leaders, with the popes having no primacy over other particulate churches and the universal church, and "that the Roman primacy had its origin in papal ambition," having developed later, in the 4th and 5th centuries.

Several facts, however, have suggested the existence of an early juridical union among the local churches, which attested to a prominent position of the Roman bishop. This can be seen in the use of the "letters and lists of communion", which date back to the end of the second century, possibly inspired by Paul's Epistle to Philemon. A faithful traveler was only admitted into the spiritual life of another local church, if he possessed a letter written by his bishop, proving that he is in union with his prelate. Then, there is the ascertainment of whether that bishop and the church he governs are orthodox, utilizing lists which various churches possess, and which are continually updated:

"Heretics and schismatics themselves seek for a letter of communion from any church, preferably from Rome, to be accepted in other churches, and to be in communion with one of these churches means to be in communion with the whole Catholic Church (...) To find out whether a bishop is in communion with the Catholic Church, recourse is had to three criteria: first of all communion with the greatest number of bishops; then with the principal and most ancient Churches; finally with the Church of Rome. This last criterion is the decisive one since the bishop of Rome must not demonstrate his communion with the Catholic Church, he being the center of this communion. The list of bishops in communion, which is found together in the Church of Rome, gives the last guarantee."

The early popes did not assert their primacy and jurisdiction over the Church, although on many occasions they interfered in local communities, as Clement I, or tried to establish a doctrine binding the Universal Church like Victor I (over the Quartodecimanism controversy). Other bishops would also delineate on papal rights, such as Ignatius of Antioch in the second century, who reported that the Roman Church exercised a "presidency in love" among the Christian churches, and Irenaeus, who at the same time, emphasized the unique position of the pope. Catholic historians maintain that "History bears full testimony that from its earliest times, the Roman See never claimed supreme headship and that this leadership was freely recognized by the Universal Church."

The prevailing view among historians is that the Church of Rome was recognized in the first three centuries of Christianity as having prominence in matters relating to the affairs of the Universal Church. However, this role developed and became deeply accentuated in the following centuries, especially from the fifth century and after the eleventh.

This opinion is also shared by some Catholic scholars, such as the authors of the Catholic Encyclopedia, which states about the early papal primacy:

"It is clear that it was not exercised in the same way as in later times. The Church was still in its infancy, and it would be unreasonable to look for a fully developed process governing the relations of the Supreme Pontiff with the bishops of other sees. Establishing such a system required the action of time, and was only gradually incorporated into the canons. Moreover, there would be infrequent intervention when the apostolic tradition was still fresh and vigorous in every part of Christendom. Hence papal prerogatives came into play, but rarely."

== Means of papal election ==
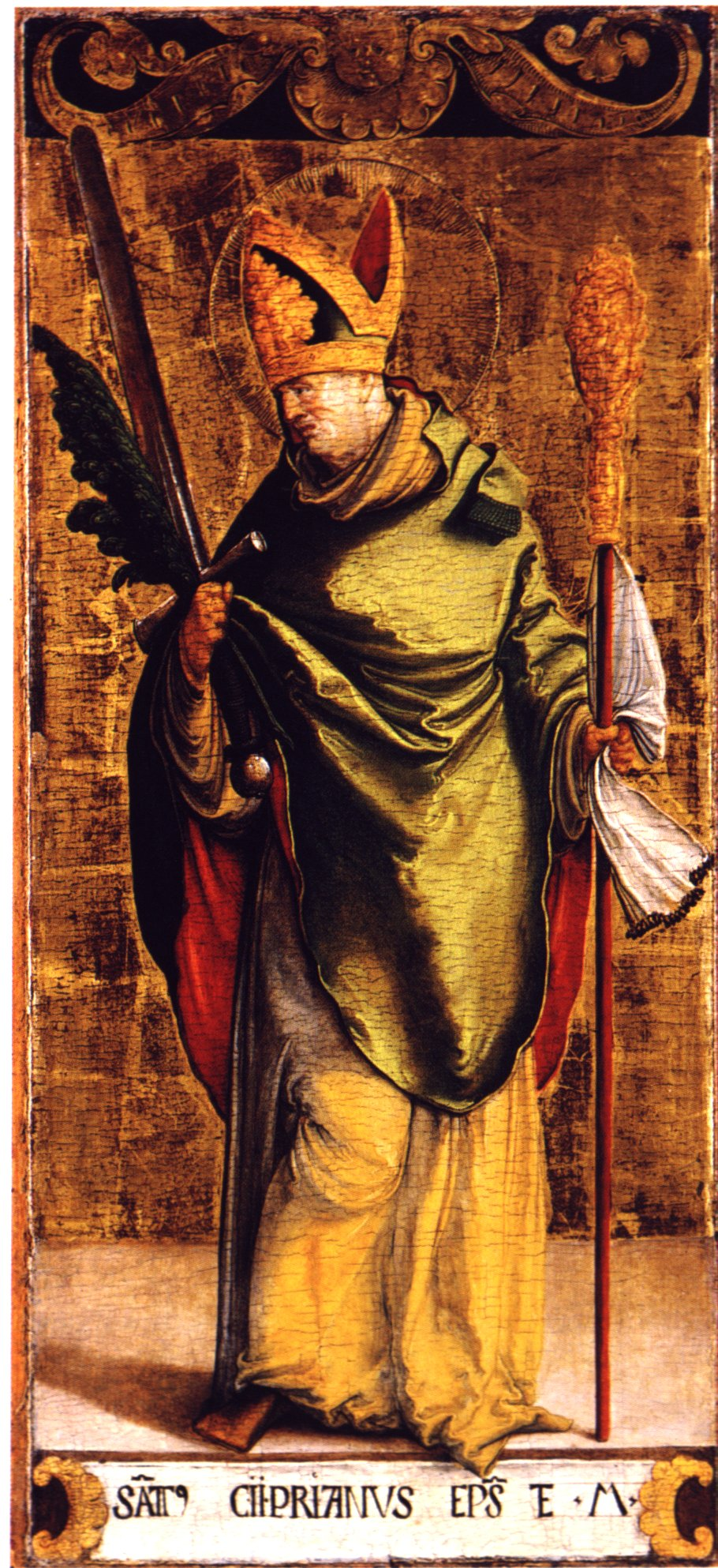
Cyprian provided the first written evidence of a papal election.

The first record of the methods of an early papal election date to 236, regarding the choice of Pope Fabian, reported by Eusebius of Caesarea: A dove landed on Fabian's head and "then all the people as if impelled by a divine spirit, with a united and anxious voice cried out that he was worthy, and immediately placed him in the episcopal seat." This episode evidences that "the choice of bishop was a concern of the Christian public, of the whole community of Rome." More evidence is available during the schism between Novatian and Cornelius, in which St. Cyprian, Bishop of Carthage, wrote: "Moreover, Cornelius was made bishop by the choice of God and Christ, by the favorable testimony of almost all the clergy, by the votes of the laity present, and by the assembly of the bishops."

== Early papal tombs ==
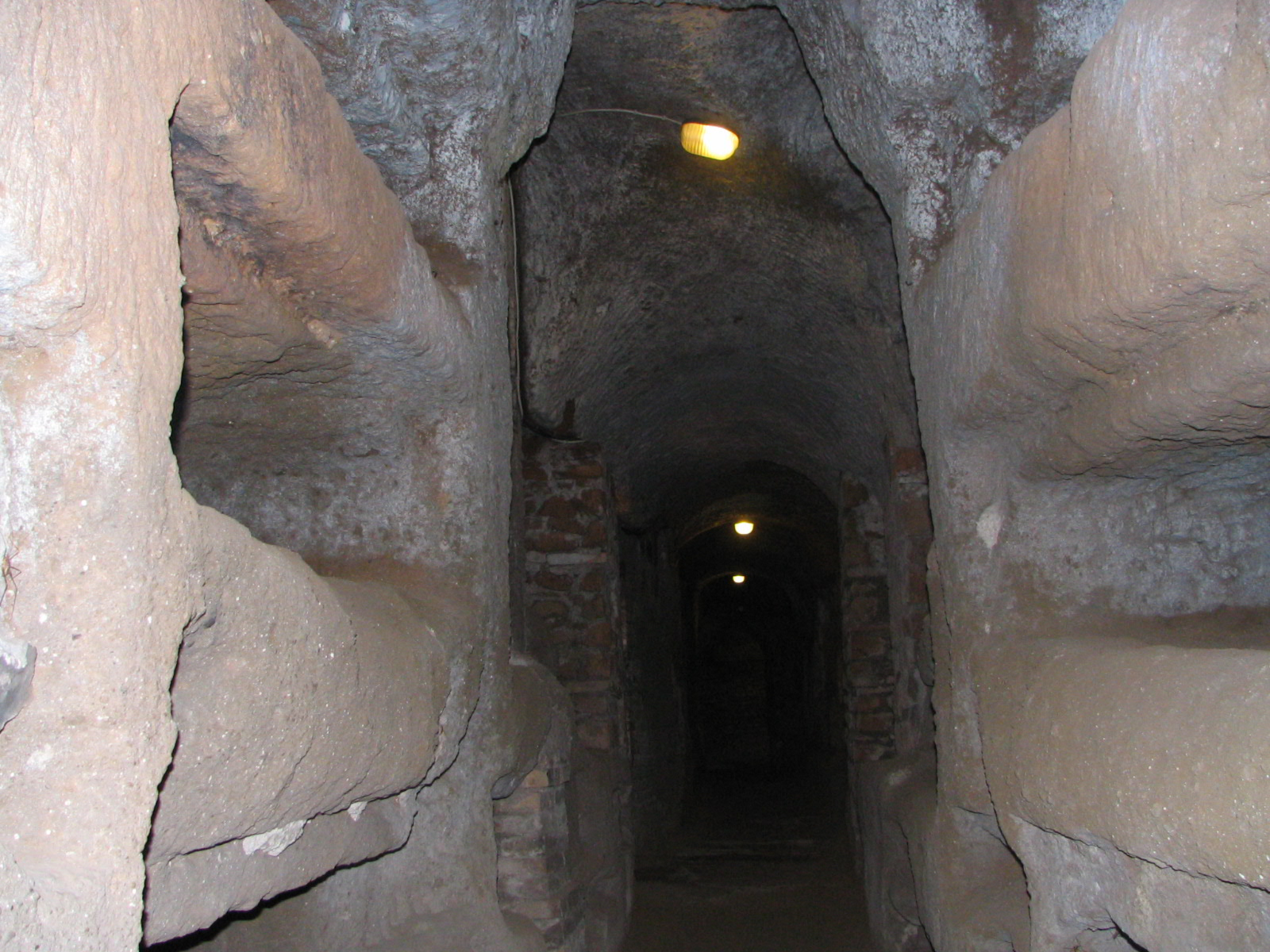
Niches in the catacomb of Callixto.

Most of the early popes from the 2nd to 4th century were buried in the Roman Catacomb of Callixtus, on the Via Appia, which is said to have been founded by the future Pope Callixtus I while he was still a deacon of Rome under Pope Zeferinus, extending the pre-existing hypogeum. Greek language inscriptions discovered in the catacomb known as the Crypt of the Popes, indicate it to be the catacomb of Callixtus, Anicetus, Soter, Zeferinus, Urban I, Pontian, Anterus, Fabian, Lucius I, Sixtus II, Alexander I, Eutychian, and Miltiades. A long inscription made in the period of Pope Sixtus III (around 440) outside the catacomb, in the area of Saints Gaius and Eusebius, might indicate the tomb of Pope Caius and Eusebius; in another area, there is a tomb attributed to Pope Cornelius, which bears the inscription "cornelivs martyr." The catacomb was abandoned in the 9th century, being rediscovered in 1854 by the Italian archaeologist Giovanni Battista de Rossi.

Some popes were buried in other Roman catacombs, such as the Catacomb of Priscilla in the Via Salaria (Pope Marcellinus and Marcellus I), and of Calepodius in the Via Aurelia (Callixtus I, who was not buried in the cemetery that bears his name.) Pope Felix I, according to legend, was buried in the "Catacomb of the Two Felixes," which has never been located.

== History ==
The first document provided by a pope is from Clement I in the late 1st century, in which he wrote an epistle to the church in Corinth, Greece, intervening in an important dispute, and apologizing for not having taken earlier action. Clement was the first Church Father, thus founding the patristic ecclesiastical period, which would last until the 8th century. A few years later in the early second century, St. Ignatius praises the purity of Rome's faith. In the second century, Roman bishops erected monuments to the apostles Peter and Paul and gave alms to poor churches. Pope Pius I later condemns and excommunicates the heretics Valentinus and Marcion, who had visited Rome to consult him, beginning the struggle against Gnostics and Montanists in Anatolia.

Later in the same century, the popes became involved in the Quartodeciman controversy, in which the Bishop Polycarp of Smyrna visited Pope Anicetus around 155 AD, and they argued over the divergence in customs. The meeting was ineffective and ended peacefully, the difference became in fact an ecclesiastical controversy when Pope Victor I attempted to declare the practice of excommunicating all who followed Nisan 14 (considered by him heresy). However, the excommunication of Asians by Victor was revoked and the two sides reconciled as a result of the interventions of other bishops.

In the 3rd century, the other prelates commonly appealed to the bishop of Rome for problems they could not solve. Between 199 and 217, Zeferinus was appointed pope, but was unable to condemn the heresies of his day. After his death, Callixtus I was elected pope, the Roman cleric Hippolytus judged him incompetent like his predecessor, causing a schism, and over ten years, Hippolytus commanded a separate congregation, and was, therefore, the first antipope. From 222 to 230, Emperor Alexander Severus disregarded the laws of persecution of Christians. At this time, Pope Urban I was appointed, who regulated the use of tithes for ecclesiastical purposes.

In 250, Pope Fabian sent missions to evangelize the province of Gaul, being martyred when Emperor Decius began a new persecution in which some Christians apostatized to save their lives. In early 251, the persecution diminished, and two schools of thought emerged, led by two candidates for the papacy: One side, advocated by Novatian, believed that apostates could not be forgiven even if they repented; the opposite side, advocated by Cornelius, professed that sinners would be forgiven if they showed repentance.

Attempting to provoke a crisis in the Church, Decius prevented the election of a new pope, however, when he was forced to leave the area to fight the Goth invaders, elections were held, and Cornelius was elected in March 251. Soon after, Novatian proclaimed himself antipope and led a schism. Cornelius convened a synod in Carthage of 60 bishops that reaffirmed him as the legitimate pope and excommunicated Novatian, as well as anathemizing Novatianism. The verdict of the synod was sent to the Christian bishops, their letters being proof of the size of the Roman Church in the third century, counting with approximately fifty thousand worshipers.

In 254, Stephen I became Bishop of Rome, and quickly rivaled St. Cyprian, bishop of Carthage, over the deposition and replacement of Marcian, bishop of Arles. Later their rivalry was renewed when the controversy over the use of baptism began; Stephen I defended the Roman tradition that baptism is effective even if done by apostates (the lapsi); while Cyprian defended the African and Asian belief that baptism administered by heretics is invalid, rebaptism being necessary. The issue did not cause a schism because Stephen and Cyprian were martyred during the conflict in Diocletian's persecution. The next pope, Sixtus II, was more conciliatory than Stephen and restored relations and communion with these Churches, although, like his predecessor, disapproved of rebaptism.

== Apocryphal documents, speculations and legends about the early popes ==
Several apocryphal documents have been attributed to early popes, the most famous and notable being the "Decrees of Pseudo-Isidore" or "False Decretals," a collection of sixty letters containing canonical laws composed in the mid-ninth century by an author using the pseudonym Isidorus Mercator, attributed to popes St. Clement (88–97) or Melchias (311–314), and which was considered authentic until the fifteenth century.

Many other legends, myths, and tales were also later developed about the lives of many of these popes. The Liber Pontificalis, which relates the history of the bishops of Rome since St. Peter, compiled in the 5th or 6th century, is also extremely inaccurate about the early papacy and took in many inauthentic documents in its content. (Note: See Liberian Catalogue.)

== Representation in art and iconography ==
The Anchor or Cross of St. Clement, iconography of Pope Clement I.

Since all early popes were considered saints by the Church, they are often depicted with their iconography, such as Saint Clement represented by having an anchor by his side, since according to legend, he was martyred by drowning with an anchor tied around his neck; or Saint Cornelius, represented by the horn (reference to the origin of his Latin name meaning "horn" or "horn").

It is common for these characters to be anachronistically depicted wearing papal robes, including the pallium, and often the papal tiara or mitre, ornaments that came into use long after early papacy.

== Popes of the period ==
Although the characteristics of the early papacy developed over time, the period from 30 to 313 is a rough approximation used by scholars as a likely date to characterize this period. There were 32 popes at this time and most pontificates were short, since, due to occasional Roman persecutions, many popes were martyred shortly after being elected.

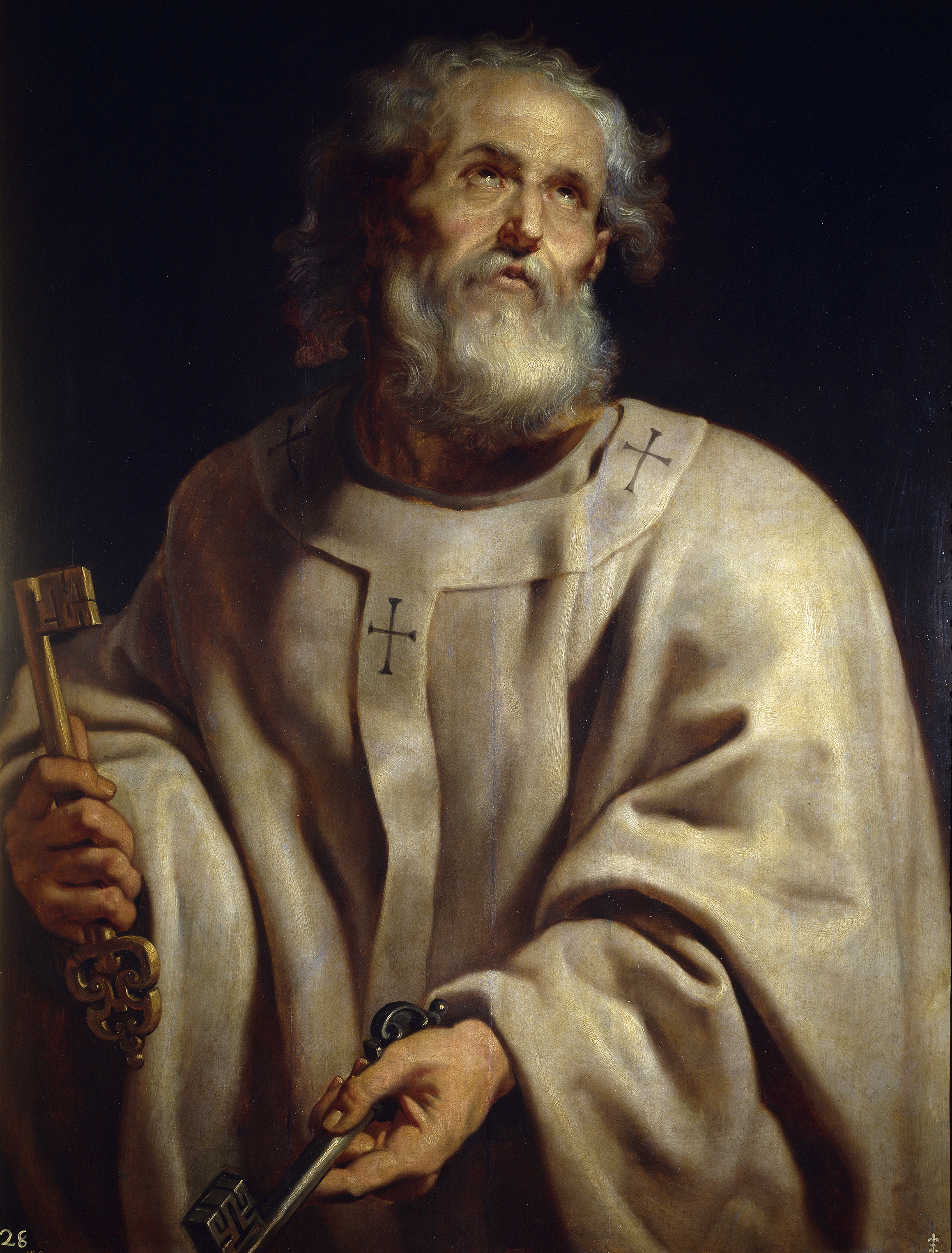
Saint Peter (33-67)

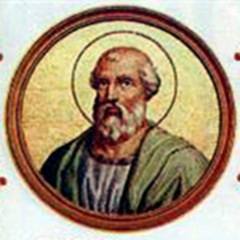
Pope Linus (67-79)

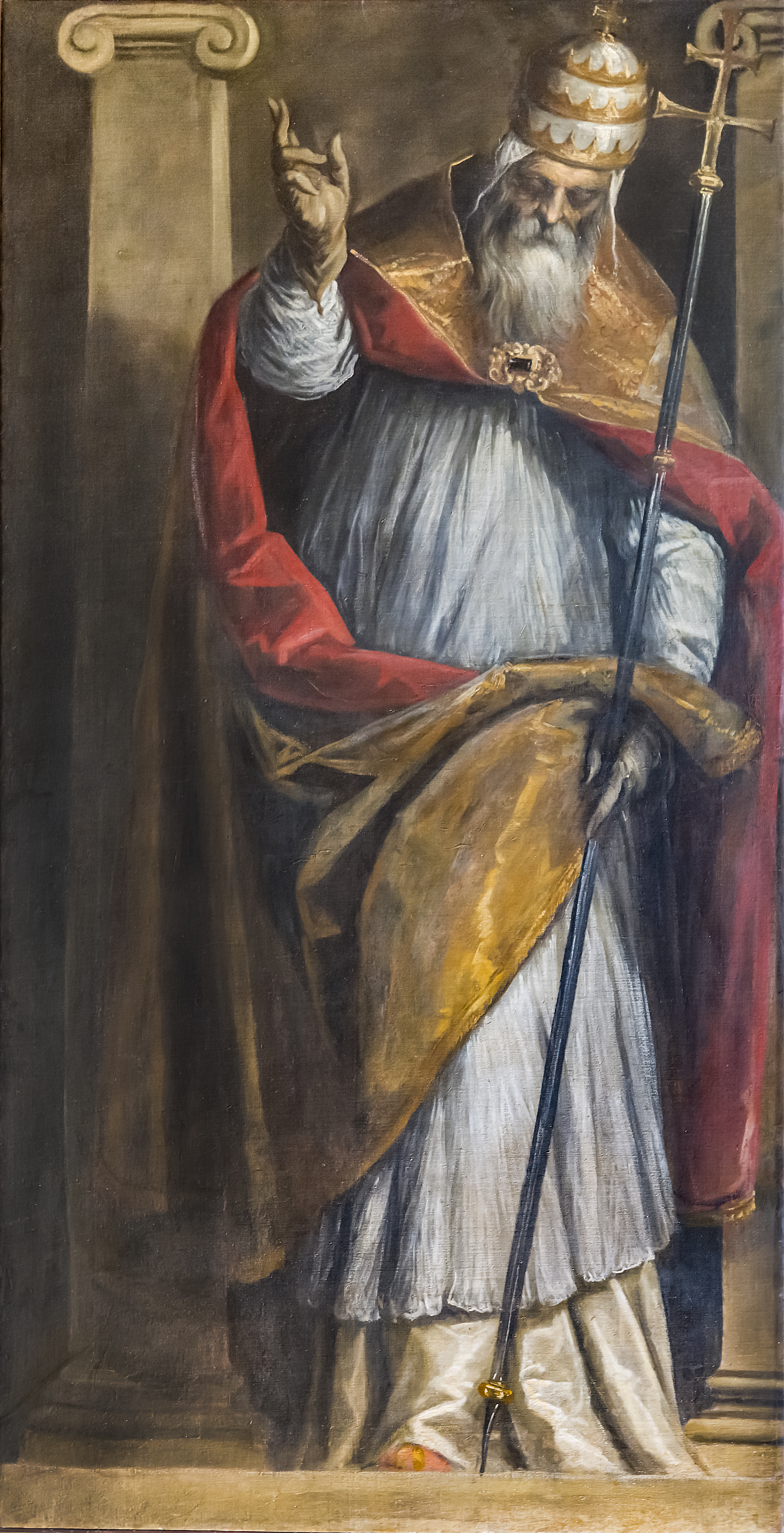
Pope Anacletus (79-88)

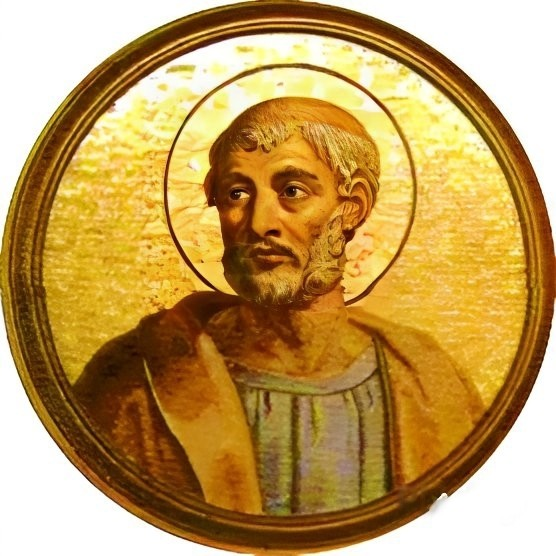
Clement of Rome (88-97)

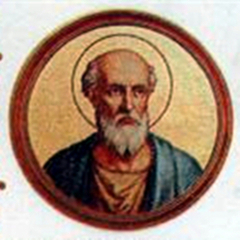
Pope Evaristus (97-105)

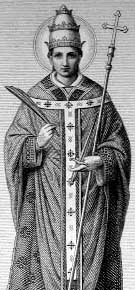
Pope Alexander I (105-115)

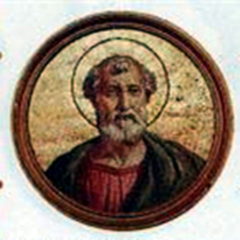
Pope Sixtus I (115-125)

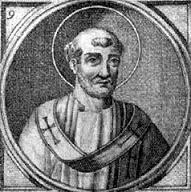
Pope Telesphorus (125-136)

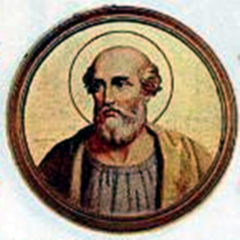
Pope Hyginus (136-140)

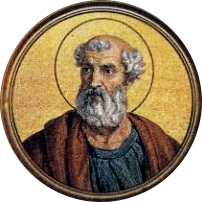
Pope Pius I (140-155)

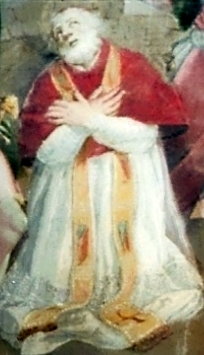
Pope Anicetus (155-166)

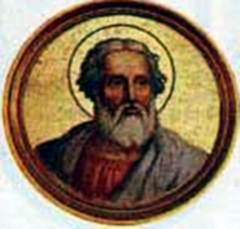
Pope Soter (166-175)

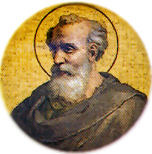
Pope Eleutherius (175-189)

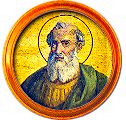
Pope Victor I (189-199)

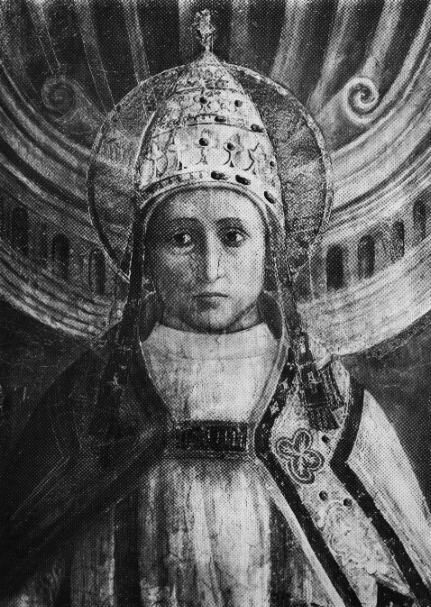
Pope Zephyrinus (199-217)

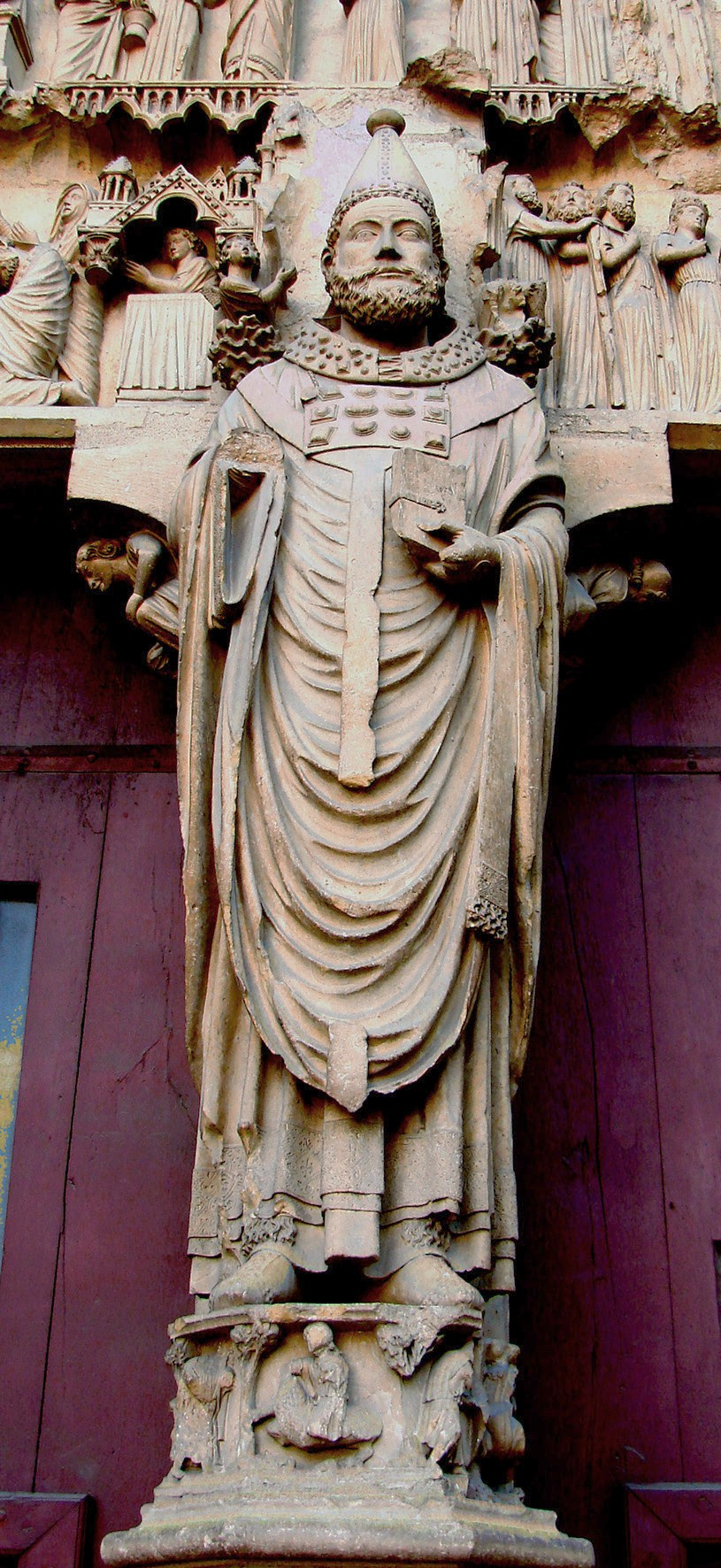
Pope Callixtus I (217-222)

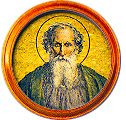
Pope Urban I (222-230)

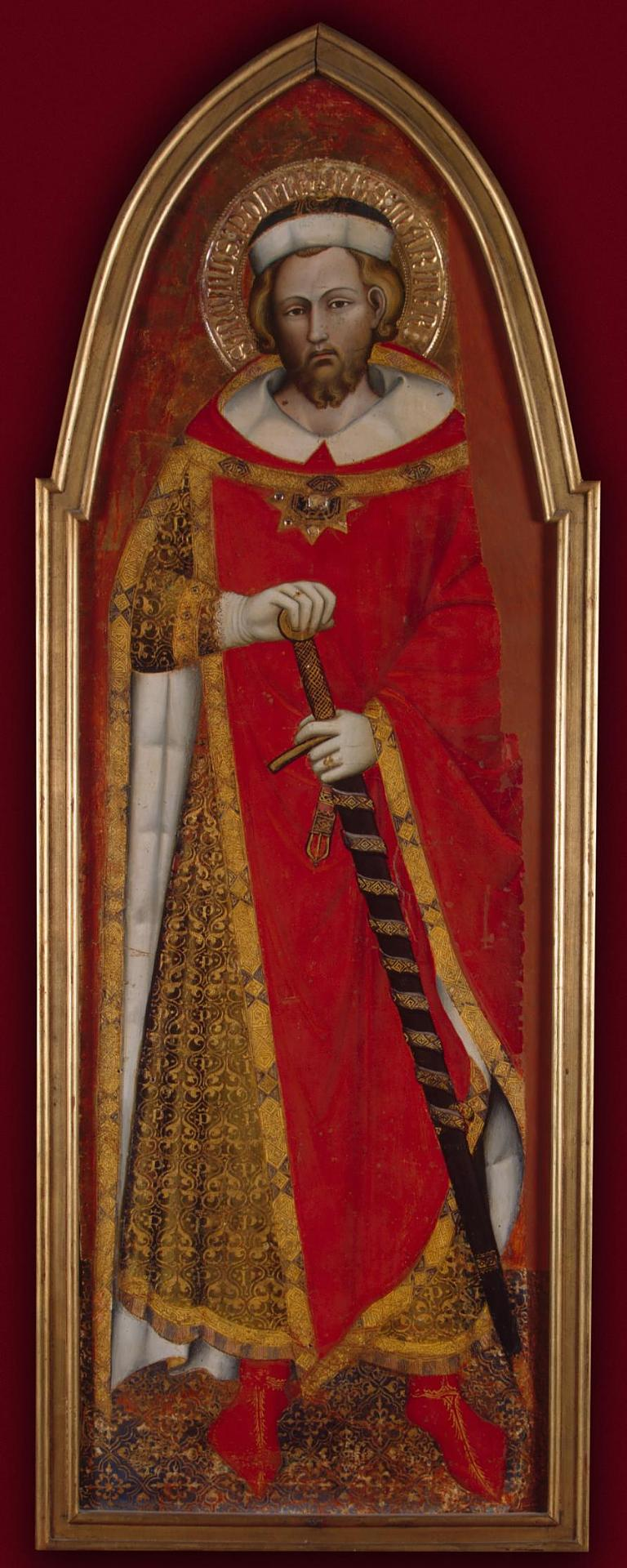
Pope Pontian (230-235)

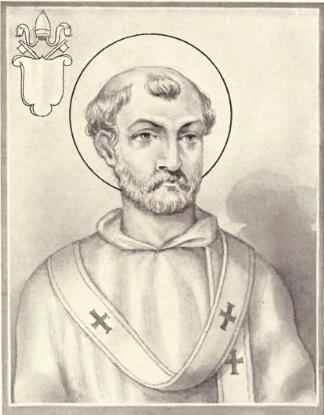
Pope Anterus (235-236)

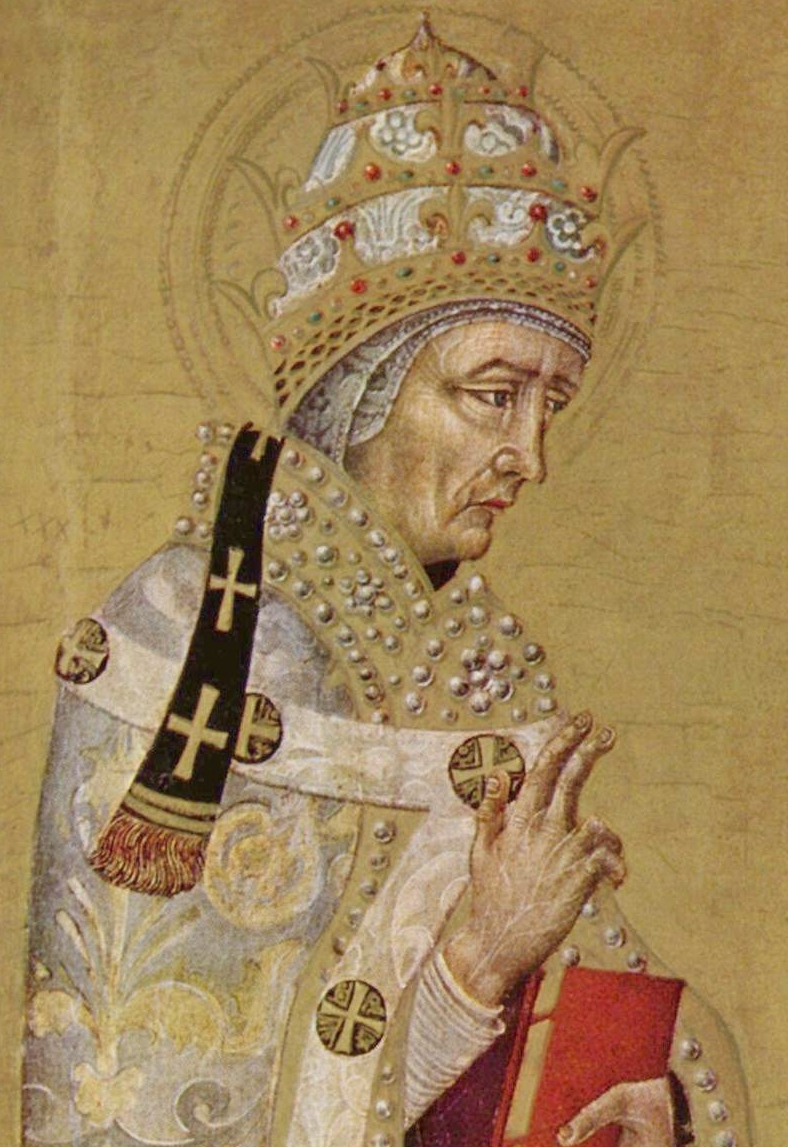
Pope Fabian (236-250)

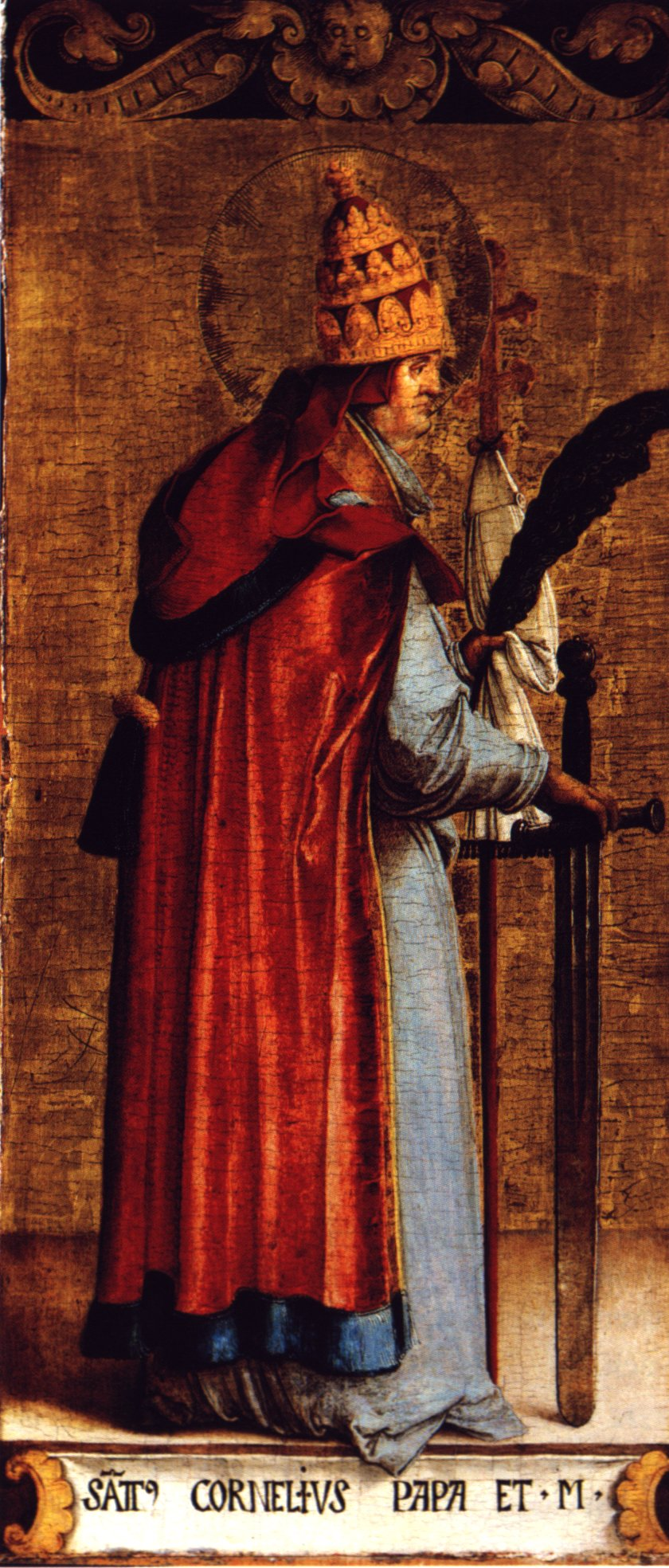
Pope Cornelius (251-253)

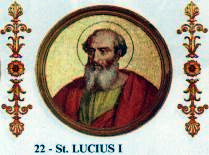
Pope Lucius I (253-254)

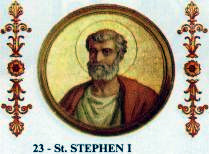
Pope Stephen I (254-257)

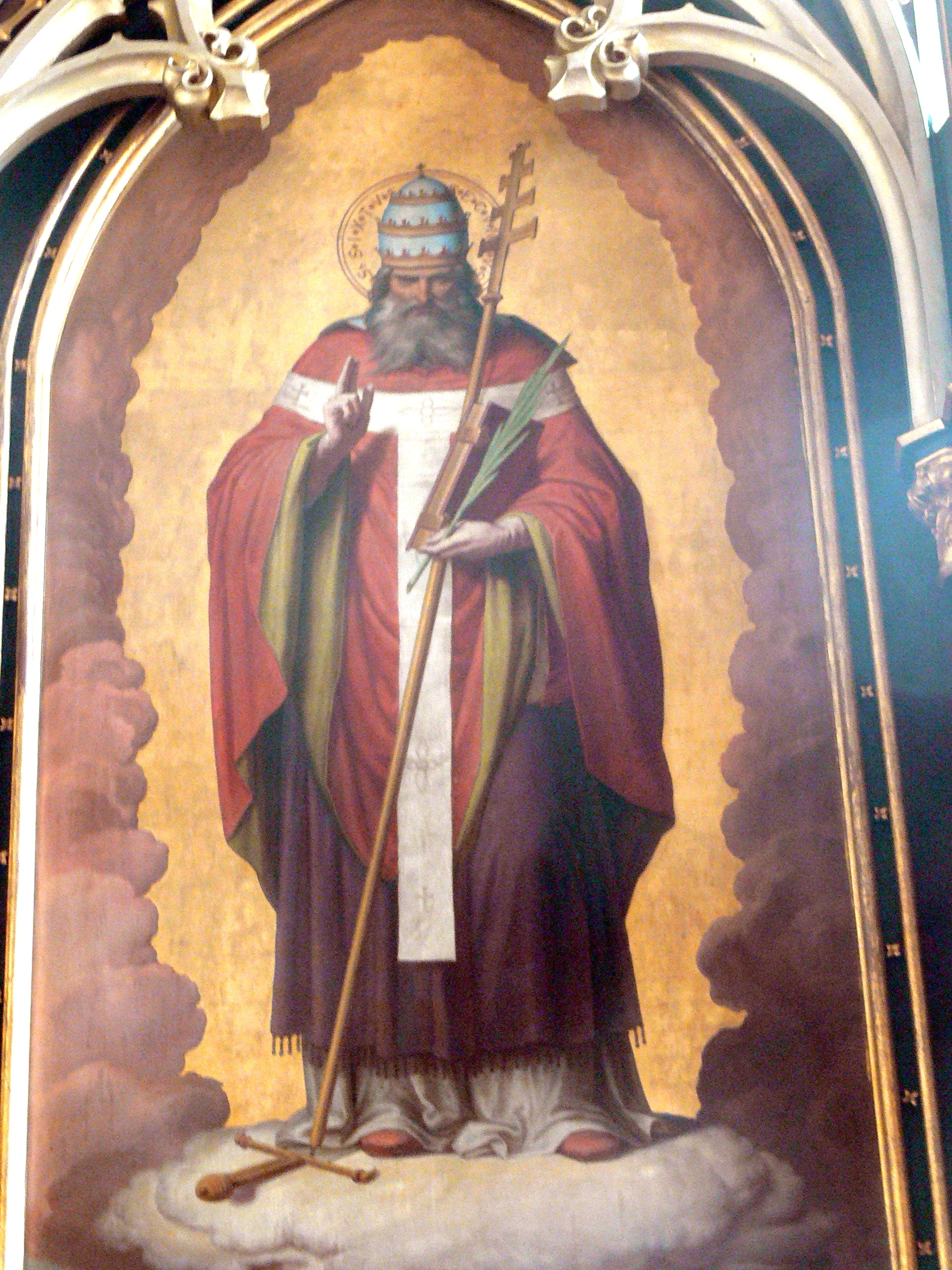
Pope Sixtus II (257-258)

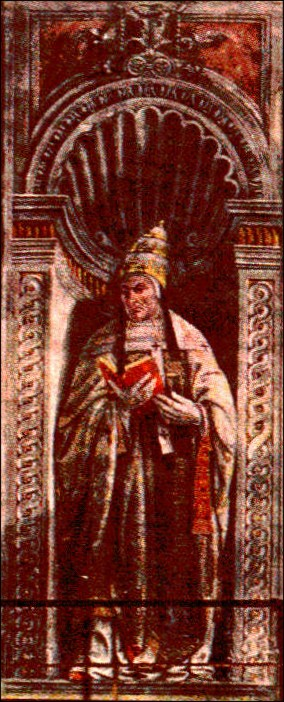
Pope Dionysius (260-268)

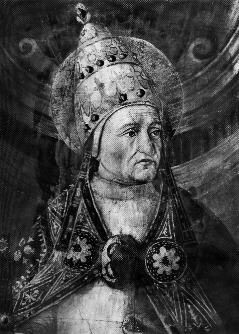
Pope Felix I (269-274)

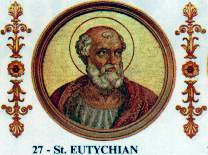
Pope Eutychian (275-283)

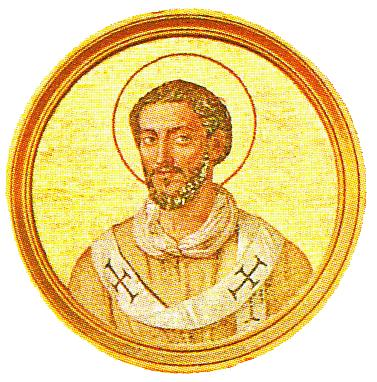
Pope Caius (283-296)

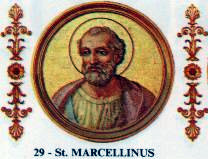
Pope Marcellinus (296-304)

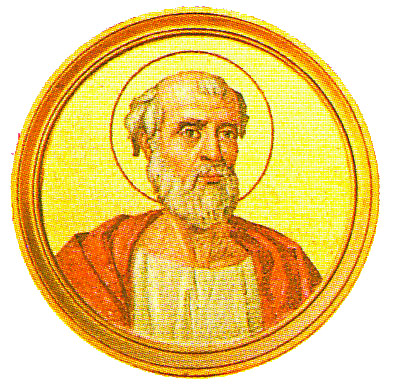
Pope Marcellus I (308-309)

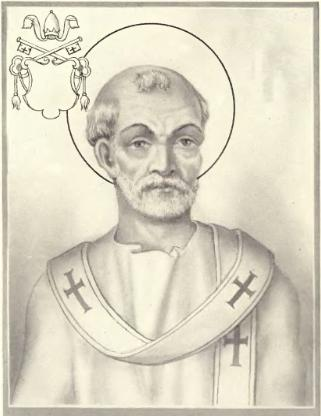
Pope Eusebius (309-310)

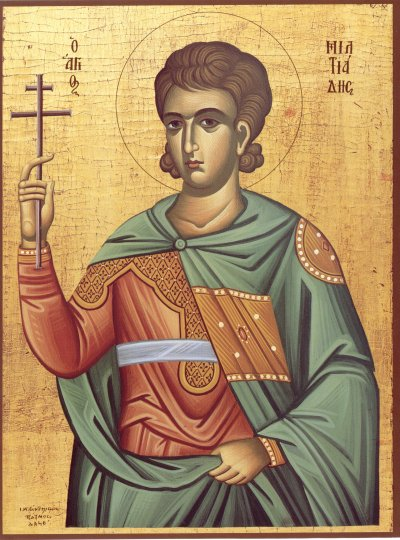
Pope Miltiades (311-314)

== See also ==
- History of the papacy
- Papacy in late antiquity
- Papal titles
