= Magrassi =

Magrassi is a surname. Notable people with the surname include:

- Andrea Magrassi (born 1993), Italian footballer
- Blanca Magrassi Scagno (1923–2015), Mexican activist
- Flaviano Magrassi (1908–1974), Italian virologist
- Paolo Magrassi, Italian technologist
