= Pontifex (surname) =

Pontifex is used in modern times as a surname. This family has been traced to John Pontifex, of West Wycombe, Bucks, and his wife Alice. John left a will in 1589. Before him there were several people named Pontifex in Buckinghamshire, including Richard Pontifex of Wingrave, husbandman (found in Common Pleas 1432–65); John Pontifex of East Claydon, husbandman (found 1489–1513); and John Pontifex of Hughenden, cook, and his wife Joan (found 1551–53). Hughenden is adjacent to West Wycombe, so these could be the parents of John Pontifex of West Wycombe.

Notable people with the surname include:

- Alfred Pontifex (1842–1930), English cricketer
- Charles Pontifex (1831–1912), English cricketer and lawyer who was knighted
- Dudley Pontifex (1855–1934), English cricketer, all-round sportsman and lawyer
- John Pontifex (cricketer, born 1771) (1771–1841), English cricketer
- John Pontifex (cricketer, born 1796) (1796–1875), English cricketer and father of Charles Pontifex
- Kyle Pontifex (born 1980), New Zealand field hockey player
- Max Pontifex, (1910–1998), Australian rules footballer
- Sydney Pontifex (1803–1874), English cricketer

In literature, the fictional (but semi-autobiographical) Pontifex family are the central characters in The Way of All Flesh, the 1903 novel by Samuel Butler.
