= Pope Fabian =

Head of the Catholic Church from 236 to 250

Pope Saint Fabian
- Bishop of Rome
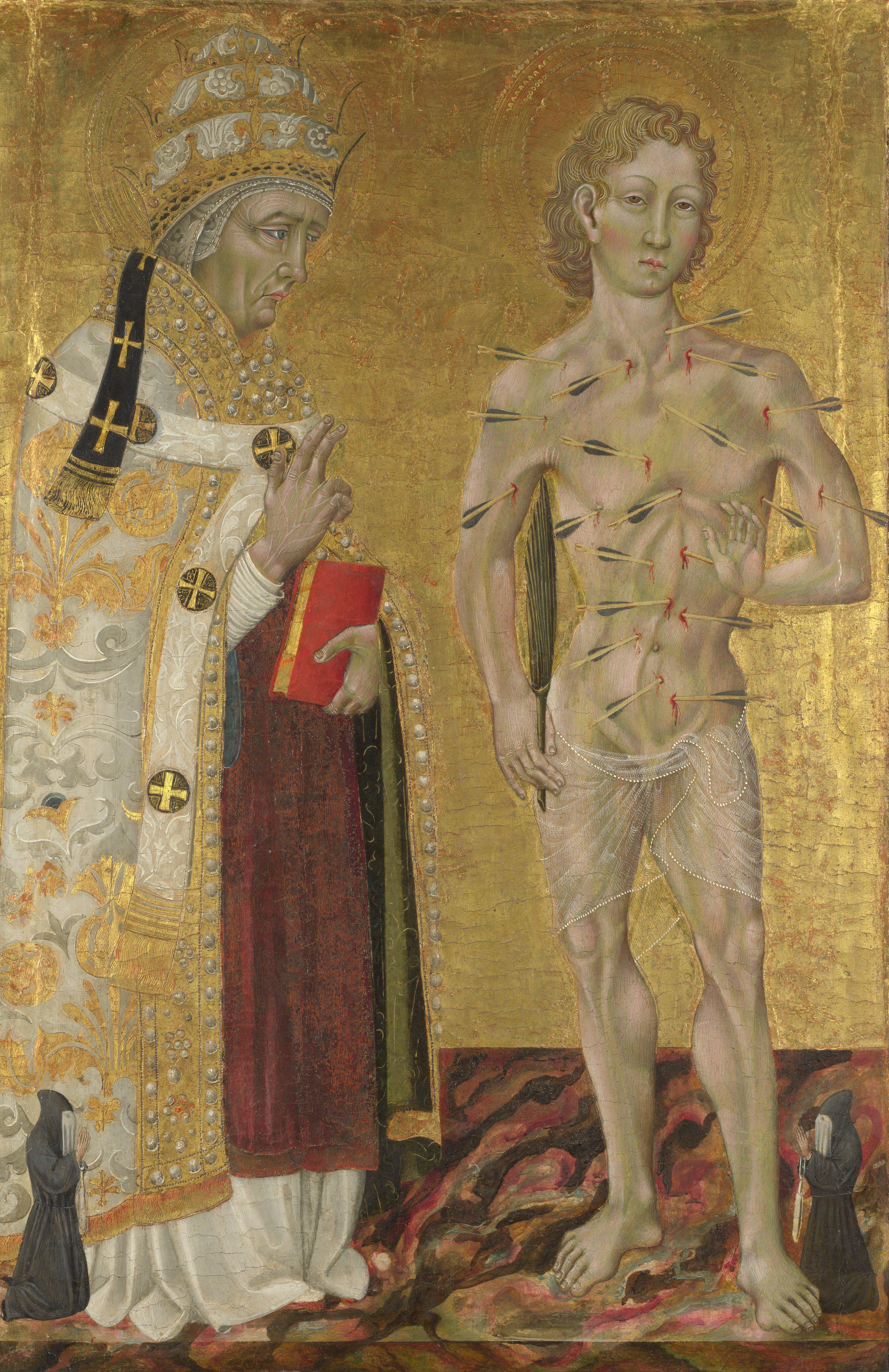
- Saint Fabian and Sebastian by Giovanni di Paolo (c. 1450). Fabian wears an anachronistic papal tiara.
- Church: Catholic Church
- Papacy began: 10 January 236
- Papacy ended: 20 January 250
- Predecessor: Anterus
- Successor: Cornelius

Personal details
- Born: Rome, Italy, Roman Empire
- Died: 20 January 250 Rome, Italy, Roman Empire
- Parents: Fabius

Sainthood
- Feast day: 20 January (Catholic Church, Orthodox Church, Anglican Communion); 5 August (Orthodox Church); 7 & 11 Meshir (Coptic Christianity)
- Venerated in: Catholic Church; Eastern Orthodox Church; Oriental Orthodoxy; Anglican Communion
- Attributes: Dove; Papal vestments; Papal tiara

Pope Fabian (Latin: Fabianus) was the bishop of Rome and head of the Catholic Church from 10 January 236 until his death on 20 January 250, succeeding Anterus. A dove is said to have descended on his head to mark him as the Holy Spirit's unexpected choice to become the next pope. He was succeeded by Cornelius.

Most of his papacy was characterized by amicable relations with the imperial government, and the schism between the Roman congregations of Pontian and Hippolytus was ended. He divided Rome into diaconates and appointed secretaries to collect the records of the martyrs. He sent out seven "apostles to the Gauls" as missionaries, but probably did not baptize Emperor Philip the Arab as is alleged. He died a martyr at the beginning of the Decian persecution and is venerated as a saint by the Catholic Church and the Orthodox Church.

== Early life and accession ==
According to the Liber Pontificalis, Fabian was a noble Roman by birth, and his father's name was Fabius. Nothing more is known about his background. The legend concerning the circumstances of his election is preserved by the fourth-century writer Eusebius of Caesarea (Church History, VI. 29). One authority refers to him as "Flavian".

After the short reign of Pope Anterus, Fabian had come to Rome from the countryside when the new papal election began. "Although present", says Eusebius, Fabian "was in the mind of none". While the names of several illustrious and noble churchmen were being considered over the course of thirteen days, a dove suddenly descended upon the head of Fabian. To the assembled electors, this strange sight recalled the gospel scene of the descent of the Holy Spirit on Jesus at the time of his baptism by John the Baptist. The congregation took this as a sign that he was marked out for this dignity, and Fabian was at once proclaimed bishop by acclamation.

== Papacy ==
During Fabian's reign of 14 years, there was a lull in the persecution which had resulted in the exile of both Anterus' predecessor Pontian and the antipope (and later saint) Hippolytus. Fabian had enough influence at court to effect the return of the bodies of both of these martyrs from Sardinia, where they had died at hard labor in the mines. The report that he baptized the emperor Philip the Arab and his son, however, is probably a legend, although he did seem to enjoy some connections at court, since the bodies of Pontian and Hippolytus could not have been exhumed without the emperor's approval.

According to the sixth-century historian and hagiographer Gregory of Tours Fabian sent out the "apostles to the Gauls" to Christianise Gaul in A.D. 245. Fabian sent seven bishops from Rome to Gaul to preach the Gospel: Gatianus of Tours to Tours, Trophimus of Arles to Arles, Paul of Narbonne to Narbonne, Saturnin to Toulouse, Denis to Paris, Austromoine to Clermont, and Martial to Limoges. He also condemned Privatus, the originator of a new heresy in Africa.

The Liber Pontificalis says that Fabian divided the Christian communities of Rome into seven districts, each supervised by a deacon. Eusebius (VI §43) adds that he appointed seven subdeacons to help collect the acta of the martyrs—the reports of the court proceedings on the occasion of their trials. There is also a tradition that he instituted the four minor clerical orders: porter, lector, exorcist, and acolyte. However most scholars believe these offices evolved gradually and were formally instituted at a later date.

His deeds are thus described in the Liber Pontificalis:

Hic regiones dividit diaconibus et fecit vii subdiacones, qui vii notariis imminerent, Ut gestas martyrum integro fideliter colligerent, et multas fabricas per cymiteria fieri praecepit.
He divided the regiones into deaconships and made seven sub-deaconships which seven secretaries oversaw, so that they brought together the deeds of the martyrs faithfully made whole, and he brought forth many works in the cemeteries.

The Liberian Catalogue of the popes also reports that Fabian initiated considerable work on the catacombs, where honored Christians were interred, and where he also caused the body of Pontian to be entombed at the catacomb of Callixtus.

== Martyrdom and legacy ==
With the ascension of Emperor Decius, the Roman government's tolerant policy toward Christianity temporarily ended. Decius ordered everyone in the Empire, with the exception of Jews, to demonstrate loyalty to Rome by offering incense to the cult images of deities that represented the Roman state. This was unacceptable to many Christians who took the commandment against idolatry seriously. Fabian was one of the earliest victims of Decius, dying as a martyr on 20 January 250, at the beginning of the Decian persecution, though probably in prison, rather than by execution.

Fabian was interred in the catacomb of Callixtus in Rome. The Greek inscription on his tomb has survived, and bears the words: "Fabian, Bishop, Martyr". Fabian's remains were later reinterred at San Sebastiano fuori le mura by Pope Clement XI where the Albani Chapel is dedicated in his honour.

Fabian's feast day is commemorated on 20 January in the Catholic Church, the same as Saint Sebastian. Fabian's feast day in the Eastern Orthodox Church is 5 August, and in Coptic Christianity it is 7 and 11 Meshir. The church of Santi Fabiano e Venanzio a Villa Fiorelli (1936) in Rome is named in his honour, and also in that of Saint Venantius of Camerino who died in the same persecutions.

Fabian was highly esteemed by Cyprian. Cyprian's letter to Fabian's successor, Cornelius, calls him "incomparable" and says that the glory of his martyrdom answered the purity and holiness of his life (Cyprian, Epistle 30). Novatian refers to his nobilissima memoriae, and he corresponded with Origen.

Fabian is honored on the liturgical calendar of the Episcopal Church in the United States of America on 20 January.

== See also ==
- Papacy in early Christianity
- List of canonised popes
- List of popes who died violently
- List of Christian martyrs

Titles of the Great Christian Church
Preceded by Anterus	Bishop of Rome; 236–250	Succeeded by Cornelius
