= AlphaIC =

Method for assessing the value of IT investments

AlphaIC is a method for assessing the value of information technology (IT) investments that surpasses banal ROI analyses and looks at how IT affects an organization's intellectual capital.

The methodology was developed in 2003–2004 by technologist Paolo Magrassi and economist Alessandro Cravera, based on the observation of two ongoing trends:

- On one side, research on the information technology (IT) 'productivity paradox’ and the quantitative assessment of IT’s impact as a general purpose technology. This was mainly stimulated by Erik Brynjolfsson’s works in 1998-2002;
- On the other side, research and practitioners’ work on intangible assets (a.k.a. a company's ‘intellectual capital’), such as that by Karl-Erik Sveiby at Skandia AV in 1986, Baruch Lev at NYU's Stern in 1996, and Cravera in 1999–2000.

The two trends were merged in order to develop a ‘value of IT’ assessment methodology that go beyond simple return on investment (ROI) analyses as well as other existing methodologies, all unable to capture the true advantage provided by IT.

The methodology is copyrighted, however a simple and concise description, including that of its application in real-world organizations, is to be found in.
