= Charles Pontifex =

English lawyer, colonial administrator, and cricketer

Personal information
- Full name: Charles Pontifex
- Born: 5 June 1831; London, England
- Died: 27 July 1912 (aged 81); South Kensington, London, England
- Batting: Unknown
- Bowling: Left-arm roundarm slow-medium
- Relatives: John Pontifex (father); Sydney Pontifex (uncle)

Domestic team information
- Years: Team
- 1851–1853: Cambridge University

Career statistics
Competition	First-class
Matches	17
Runs scored	245
Batting average	9.80
100s/50s	–/–
Top score	32
Balls bowled	308
Wickets	48
Bowling average	20.50
5 wickets in innings	4
10 wickets in match	1
Best bowling	6/?
Catches/stumpings	11/–
- Source: Cricinfo, 24 May 2022

Sir Charles Pontifex KCIE (5 June 1831 – 27 July 1912) was an English lawyer and colonial administrator and a cricketer who played first-class cricket for Cambridge University and amateur teams in the 1850s. He was born in London and died in South Kensington, also part of London.

The son of John Pontifex, a cricket player of the 1820s, Charles Pontifex was educated at King's College School and at Trinity College, Cambridge. As a cricketer, he was often a lower-order batsman and usually a bowler, though he later batted as an opener and it is not always clear, from incomplete records, that he bowled in every game. Equally, it is not known if he batted right- or left-handed, and nor is his bowling style definitively recorded, though his obituary in The Times states that he bowled left-handed, while the Scores and Annals of the West Kent Cricket Club states that he was "a crafty left - hand bowler (slow medium)". He made an immediate impact in early matches for the Cambridge side in 1851: in his first game, he took six Cambridge Town Club wickets in the first innings, though the complete record for this game has not survived. He was picked for the University Match against Oxford University and took 10 wickets in the game, which Cambridge won by an innings and four runs.

Pontifex was less successful for Cambridge in the 1852 season and was not picked for the University Match, which Oxford won easily. An obituary from 1912 in The Times suggests that he was in poor health that year. After the Cambridge season was over, however, he turned out for amateur teams representing the Gentlemen of the South and the Gentlemen of Kent. He returned to better form in 1853, when he was captain of the university team. In the first first-class game of the season, against the Cambridge Town Club, he opened the batting and scored 32, the highest score of his first-class career; he also took six wickets in the Town Club's first innings. He was not successful as captain in the 1853 University Match, as Oxford again won with an innings to spare.

Pontifex graduated from Cambridge University with a Bachelor of Arts degree in 1854 and was called to the bar in the same year. He played in some amateur cricket games after Cambridge, but only three of them, in successive seasons from 1858 and all for the Gentlemen of Kent side, were rated as first-class. In 1872, he was appointed as a puisne judge on the High Court of Bengal in India "with every prospect of becoming Chief Justice", according to his Times obituary; in the event, a change of government in the UK appointed Richard Garth, also a first-class cricketer, and Pontifex remained on the judges' bench for 10 years. In 1882, he was recalled to London to become a special legal adviser to the Marquess of Hartington, Secretary of State for India and he remained in this post until he retired in 1892, at which point he was knighted.

Pontifex married in 1881; his wife was Grace, the widow of Thomas Gribble, formerly postmaster of Bengal, and her son from her first marriage was James Byng Gribble, a champion real tennis player who died in 1902. Lady Pontifex donated the James Byng Gribble Cup to the Gold Medal winner at the Lord's real tennis tournament and was therefore mentioned each year in Wisden Cricketers' Almanack's report of Marylebone Cricket Club business until her own death in 1928.
