= Pontiff =

High-ranking member of a religious office

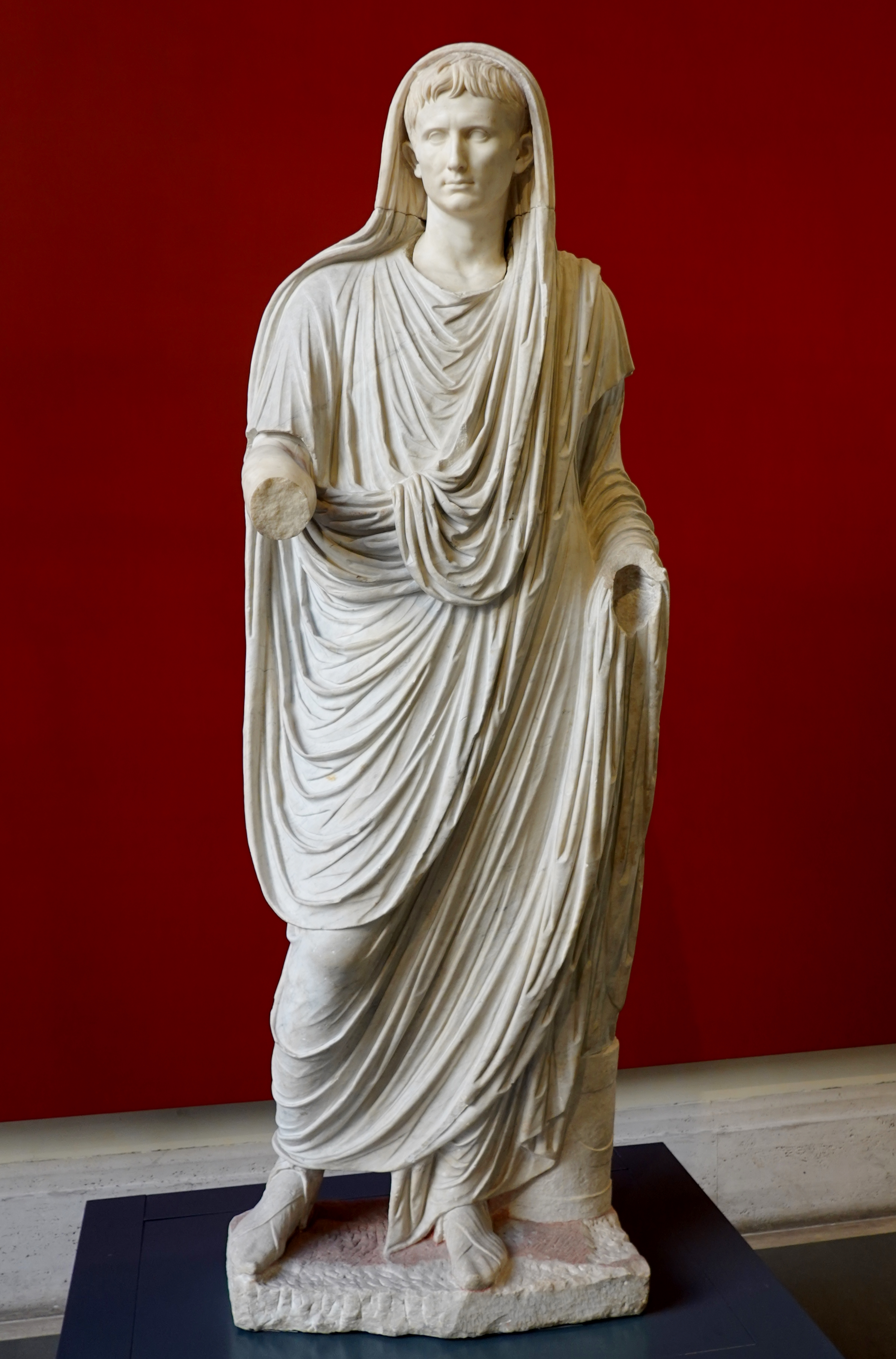
Statue of Augustus as Pontifex Maximus

In Roman antiquity, a pontiff (from Latin pontifex) was a member of the most illustrious of the colleges of priests of the Roman religion, the College of Pontiffs. The term pontiff was later applied to any high or chief priest and, in Catholic ecclesiastical usage, to bishops, especially the Pope, who is sometimes referred to as the Roman Pontiff or the Supreme Pontiff.

== Etymology ==
The English term derives through Old French pontif from Latin pontifex, a word commonly held to come from the Latin root words pons, pont- (bridge) + facere (to do, to make), and so to have the literal meaning of "bridge-builder", presumably between mankind and the deity/deities. Uncertainty prevailing, this may be only a folk etymology, but it may also recall ancient tasks and magic rites associated with bridges. The term may also be an allusion to Ancient Roman Religious rituals for placating the gods and spirits associated with the Tiber River, for instance. Also, Varro cites this position as meaning "able to do".

== Ancient Rome ==
There were four chief colleges of priests in ancient Rome, the most illustrious of which was that of the pontifices. The others were those of the augures, the quindecimviri sacris faciundis, and the epulones. The same person could be a member of more than one of these groups. Including the pontifex maximus, who was president of the college, there were originally three or five pontifices, but the number increased over the centuries, finally becoming 16 under Julius Caesar. By the third century BC the pontiffs had assumed control of the state religious system.

== Biblical usage ==
Inspiration for the Catholic use of the name pontiff for a bishop comes from the use of the same word for the Jewish High Priest in the original Latin translation of the Bible, the Vulgate, where it appears 59 times. For example at Mark 15:11, "pontifices" (plural) is the Latin term used for "The Chief Priests". And in the Vulgate version of the Letter to the Hebrews, "pontifex" (singular) is repeatedly used with reference to the then still extant High Priesthood in Judaism, and analogously suggesting Jesus Christ as the ultimate high priest.

== Catholicism ==
The word "pontiff", though now most often used in relation to a pope, technically refers to any Catholic bishop. The phrase "Roman pontiff" is therefore not tautological, but means "Bishop of Rome". In the same way, a Pontifical Mass is a mass celebrated by a bishop, not necessarily a pope. Note also the Roman Pontifical (the liturgical book containing the prayers and ceremonies for rites used by a bishop) and "pontificals", the insignia of his order that a bishop uses when celebrating Pontifical Mass. While the pontificals primarily belong to bishops, they have also been granted by papal favour or legally established Church custom to certain presbyters (e.g., abbots).

== Other religions ==
The word has been employed in English also for caliphs (Islam) and swamis and jagadgurus (Hinduism).

== See also ==
- Papal titles
- Shaman
