= Paolo Magrassi =

Italian technologist

Paolo Magrassi is an Italian technologist known as one of the authors of the Supranet concept, the co-creator of the AlphaIC methodology for assessing the value of information technology expenditures, and the manager of the Pontifex project, which in the mid-1980s introduced a novel approach to complex fleet scheduling.

In the early 2000s, Magrassi also was instrumental in introducing to the industrial and business world then-emerging miniature RFID and internet of things technologies such as those proposed by the MIT's Auto-ID Center.

He also published several books, including The Caricature Of A Revolution (2012), Digitalmente confusi (2011), La good-enough society (2010), Difendersi dalla complessità (2009), Il filo conduttore (2006), 2015 Weekend nel futuro (2005), A World Of Smart Objects (2002).
