= Papal titles =

Titles given to the Catholic Bishop of Rome

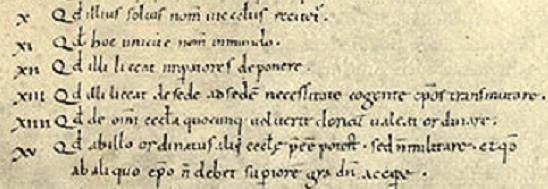
Manuscript in the Vatican Archives of the Dictatus Papae, an 11th-century document on Papal authority, which records the historical process by which the title "pope" came to be used only by the bishop of Rome. In its proposition XI, it is stated "Quod hoc unicum est nomen in mundo" ("That this name [pope] is unique in the world")

The titles of the Bishop of Rome, more often referred to as the papal titles, (Note: Examples of this application can be seen in the following websites on the titles of the Bishop of Rome: Papal Titles (Challies.com); Papal Titles (Tu Es Pestrus, The Papacy)) refer to the various titles used by protocol, as a form of addressing or designating a theological or secular reality of the Bishop of Rome (Pope). The Catholic Church believes that they "constitute what has been termed a primacy of honor. These prerogatives are not, like his jurisdictional rights, tied to the divine jure of his office. They have grown in the course of history, and have been enshrined by the passage of centuries, but they are not free from modification."

Originally the titles of the Bishop of Rome were used as expressions of respect, power, and veneration, later many became firmly associated with his office, becoming distinctive and specific titles. The oldest titles used are "pope" and "pontiff", which date back to the middle of the 3rd century. The other titles appear from the 5th century onwards and develop throughout the Middle Ages. The Annuario Pontificio, the directory of the Holy See, has published since 1716 lists of what are considered the official papal titles since then. However, the official list does not include all those in use; moreover, during history, popes have carried various other titles, sometimes for centuries, which at one point were abandoned.

== Official titles ==
The official list of papal titles, in the order they are dictated by the Annuario Pontificio in 2024, is:

- Bishop of Rome (Episcopus Romanus)
- Vicar of Jesus Christ (Vicarius Iesu Christi)
- Successor of the Prince of the Apostles (Successor principis apostolorum)
- Supreme Pontiff of the Universal Church (Summus Pontifex Ecclesiae Universalis)
- Patriarch of the West (Patriarcha Occidentis)
- Primate of Italy (Primatus Italiae)
- Metropolitan Archbishop of the Roman Province (Archiepiscopus metropolitanus provinciae Romanae)
- Sovereign of the Vatican City State (Superanus sui iuris civitatis Vaticanae)
- Servant of the Servants of God (Servus Servorum Dei)

=== Pope ===
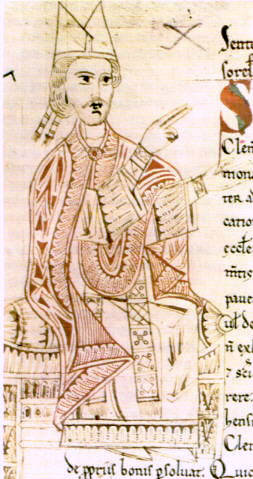
Pope Gregory VII (r. 1073–1085) ordered that the title "pope" be reserved exclusively for the Bishop of Rome. Unknown manuscript from the 11th century

The term pope comes from the Latin papa, and from the Greek πάππας (pappas, which is an affectionate word for 'father'). This is the most famous title associated with the bishop of Rome, being used in protocol, documents, and signatures. There are several interpretations as to the meaning and application of the title, among them, that pope would be a Latin acronym, where each letter would correspond to a word: Petri apostoli potestatem accipiens ("the one who receives the power of the apostle Peter"); or even Petrus apostolus princeps apostolorum ("Peter the apostle, Prince of the Apostles"). It has also been proposed as its origin the union of the first syllables of the Latin words pater ('father') and pastor ('shepherd').

Since the early third century, the term pope has been used as an expression of affectionate veneration for both the bishop of Rome and the other bishops of the West. In the East, it was initially used for priests, but after the election of the 13th patriarch of Alexandria, Heracles (r. 232–249), and his designation as pope, the title in this region is now used only for the patriarch of Alexandria.

There is a divergence of opinion among historians as to who was the first bishop of Rome who used the title. Some suggest that it was Marcellinus (r. 296–304), Damasus (r. 366–384), Siricius (r. 384–399), Pope John I (r. 523–526), or others. By the end of the fourth century, the word pope applied to the bishop of Rome, begins to express more than affectionate veneration and slowly becomes a specific title, as can be seen in the letters of the imperial chancery of Constantinople and the correspondence between Siricius and Symmachus (r. 498–514). In the sixth century, the expression became firmly associated with the bishops of Rome, and until the eleventh century, Pope Gregory VII (r. 1073–1085) "prescribed that it should be limited only to the successors of Peter."

With regard specifically to the term papacy (papatus), there is no comprehensive study of its origin, as there is for the word pope. However, the term originated around the 12th century to refer exclusively to the pope's ecclesiastical governmental system.

=== Vicar of Christ ===
Vicar of Christ (Latin Vicarius Christi) is the pope's most significant title, implying his supreme and universal primacy. It is based on the promise of Matthew 16:19 in which Jesus hands Peter the keys to the kingdom of heaven. In all countries, the key is a symbol of authority. Thus, for Catholicism, Jesus's words are a promise that he will confer upon Peter the power to rule the Church in his stead, as his vicar.

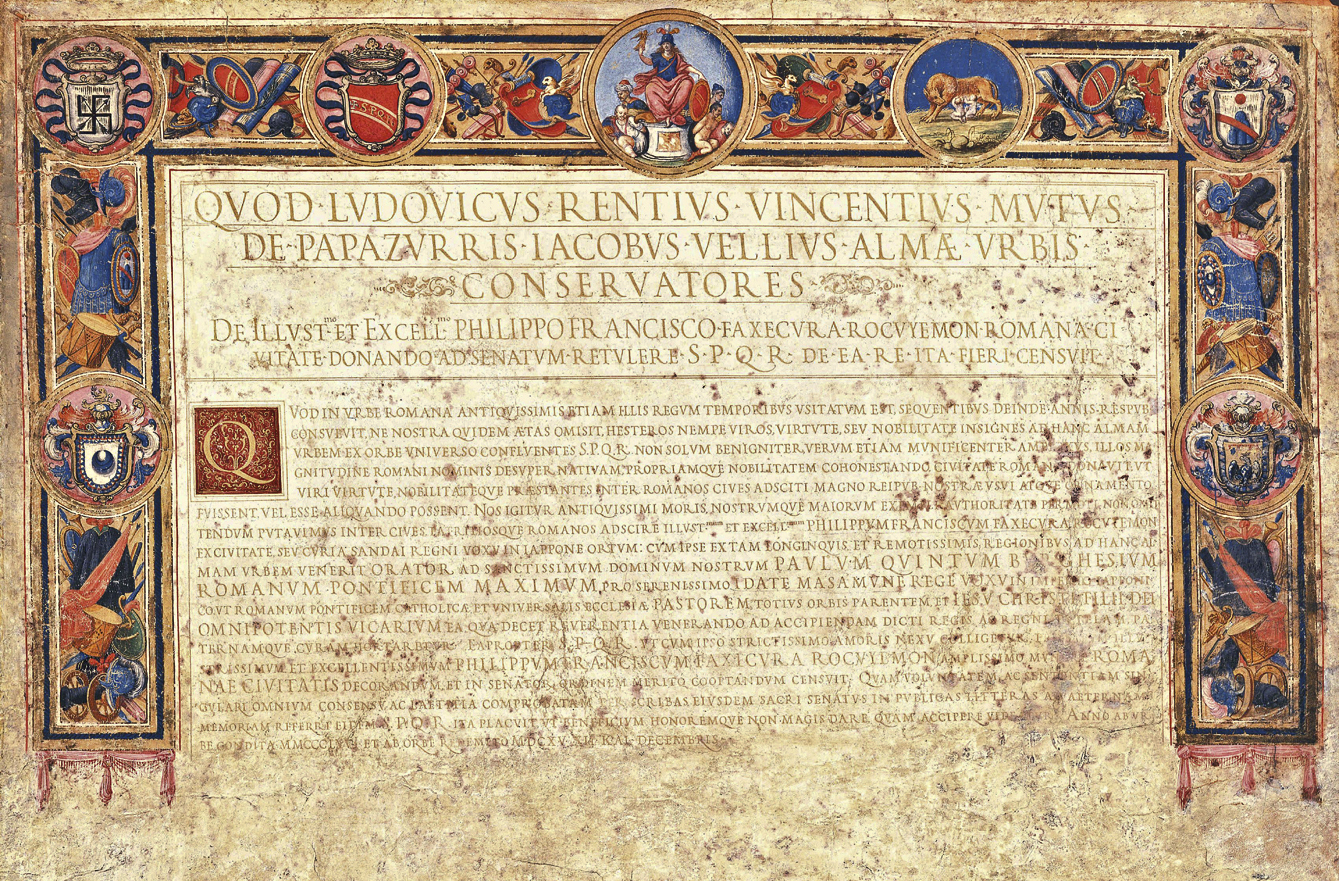
Document issued by the Roman Senate in 1615 granting the honorary title of a Roman citizen to Hasekura Tsunenaga, in which the Pope is described as "Pontiff" of Rome and Pastor of the Universal Catholic Church, Father of the Whole World, and Vicar of Jesus Christ, Almighty Son of God." (Note: The original Latin phrase is: "Romanvm pontificem catholicæ et vniversalis ecclesiæ pastorem, totivs orbis parentem, et iesv christi filii dei omnipotentis vicarivm") Sendai Museum

The first record of a title reflecting the pope's role as "Vicar" is found in a letter of 445 from Pope Leo I (r. 440–461) to Dioscorus of Alexandria, in which he designates the bishop of Rome as "earthly Vicar of the successors of Peter"; shortly afterward, in 495, there were decrees of a synod named Pope Gelasius I (r. 492–496) "Vicar of Christ" (r. 492–496). Thus, in the early Middle Ages, there were several variants of this title, such as "Vicar of Peter" (Vicarius Petri), indicating that the popes succeeded Saint Peter, "Vicar of the prince of the Apostles" (Vicarius principis apostolorum) or "Vicar of the apostolic See" (Vicarius soles Apostolica), among others. The fact that both the title "Vicar of Peter" and "Vicar of Christ" were used is demonstrated by the fact that at the end of the 8th century, Saint Boniface's oath of fidelity to Pope Gregory II (r. 715–731) uses the former, while a few decades later, Pope John VIII (r. 872–882), uses the latter. Even today, the Roman Missal in its prayers for a dead pope designates him as "Vicar of Peter."

The designation of Vicar of Christ for popes fell in regular use in the beginning of the 13th century, due to reforms employed by Pope Innocent III (r. 1198–1216). It is noted as early as 1199 in Innocent's letter to the King of Armenia, Leo II. Innocent often appealed to this title as a prerogative to appoint bishops. Other historians suggest that this title was more associated with popes in the pontificate of Pope Eugene III (r. 1145–1153) and then consolidated by Innocent. Pope Nicholas III (r. 1277–1280) used the term Vicar of God (a reference to Christ as God) as an equivalent title. Currently, the Second Vatican Council teaches that all bishops are "vicars and ambassadors of Christ."

With different theological and secular meanings, the title was also used in a personal observation by Tertullian in the third century to refer to the Holy Spirit, and in Caesaropapism from the fifth to ninth centuries to refer to rulers and the public authorities, such as kings, judges, and most prominently the Byzantine emperor.

=== Successor or Vicar of the Prince of the Apostles ===
Prince of the Apostles (Latin Principis Apostolorum) is a title reserved individually for Saint Peter. Examples of this application can be seen in the following biographies of Peter:

- St. Peter, the Prince of the Apostles (NetSaber Biographies) (in Portuguese)
- St. Peter, Prince of the Apostles in the 1913 edition of the Catholic Encyclopedia. Public domain.
- St. Peter, Prince of the Apostles (Eternal World Television Network) as a way to demonstrate his leadership among the apostles (principis means 'first' or 'principal'). Its first records date back to the sermons of Pope Leo I (r. 440–461) in the 5th century, who uses it as a demonstration of his primacy:

Perennial is the solidity of that faith that was praised in the Prince of the Apostles. And just as what Peter believed about Christ remains, so what Christ instituted in the person of Peter remains. [...] faithful to the strength of the rock he received, he does not abandon the helm of the Church entrusted to him.

The title is applied only indirectly to the pope, who is officially referred to as "Successor of the Prince of the Apostles" (Successor principis apostolorum), or also as "Vicar of the Prince of the Apostles", among other variants.

=== Pontiff ===
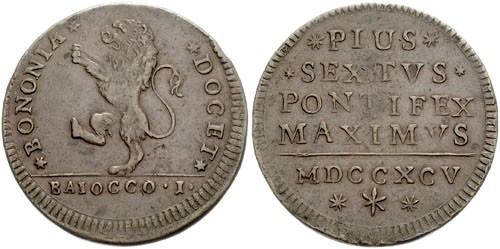
Coin from Bologna, Papal State of the 18th century, on which is written "Pius Sextus Pontifex Maximus MDCCXCV" i.e. "Pius VI, Supreme Pontiff, 1795".

The term Pontiff (Pontifex), variations of which include Roman Pontiff, Supreme Pontiff, Sovereign Pontiff and Pontifex maximus, the official name being Supreme Pontiff (Summus Pontifex) or more completely, Supreme Pontiff of the Universal Church (Summus Pontifex Ecclesiae Universalis) is one of the official titles of the pope. From the noun pontiff was formed the adjective pontifical, referring to ceremonies and institutions linked to the pope, such as the "pontifical university" (universities maintained by the Holy See and the pope) and to bishops in general, as can be seen in the expression "Roman Pontifical" (a book containing the rites reserved for bishops, such as confirmation and ordination). The term Pontifex Maximus is commonly found in inscriptions on buildings, paintings, statues, and coins about the popes, and is usually abbreviated as "Pont Max" or "P.M" (the popes began to use the title of supreme pontiff in the Italian Renaissance; from then on, the abbreviations "Pont Max" and "P M" appear several times, as in the famous painting of Pope Leo X (r. 1513–1521), by Raphael, in which is written "Leo X Pont (ifex) Max (imus)", meaning "Leo X, Supreme Pontiff"). Since the Middle Ages, the Church, starting from the election of a pope, begins to count a new calendar in "Years of Pontificate" or "Papal Years" (Anno Papalis – A.P.), which coexists with that of the Christian calendar, counting from the birth of Jesus Christ in "Years of the Lord" (Anno Domini - A.D.). The use of these two dates can be seen in several monuments of Rome, and all papal decrees as well as some Church documents.

In the Vulgate, Hebrews 5:1–4, certain priests are said to be pontiffs, pontiff meaning 'bridge builder' (pons + facere). The most common interpretation is that pontiffs are symbolically the builders of the bridge between God and men, the use of this term is justified because the pontiff is "constituted on behalf of men as mediator in things concerning God, to offer gifts and sacrifices for sins.", i.e., it refers to the sacred and evangelizing functions of priests. The use of the expression "high pontiff" for the pope is justified by Catholicism in Christ's words to Peter in "Feed my lambs... Feed my lambs... Feed my sheep" (John 21:15–17), thus Christ entrusted his flock to Peter, entrusting him with the most important priestly functions, making him high pontiff. Another interpretation suggests that the title refers to the pope's role in preserving and strengthening the unity of the Church, that is, when conflicts arise, popes act as mediators and peacemakers in their resolution, as "bridge builders" – pontiffs.

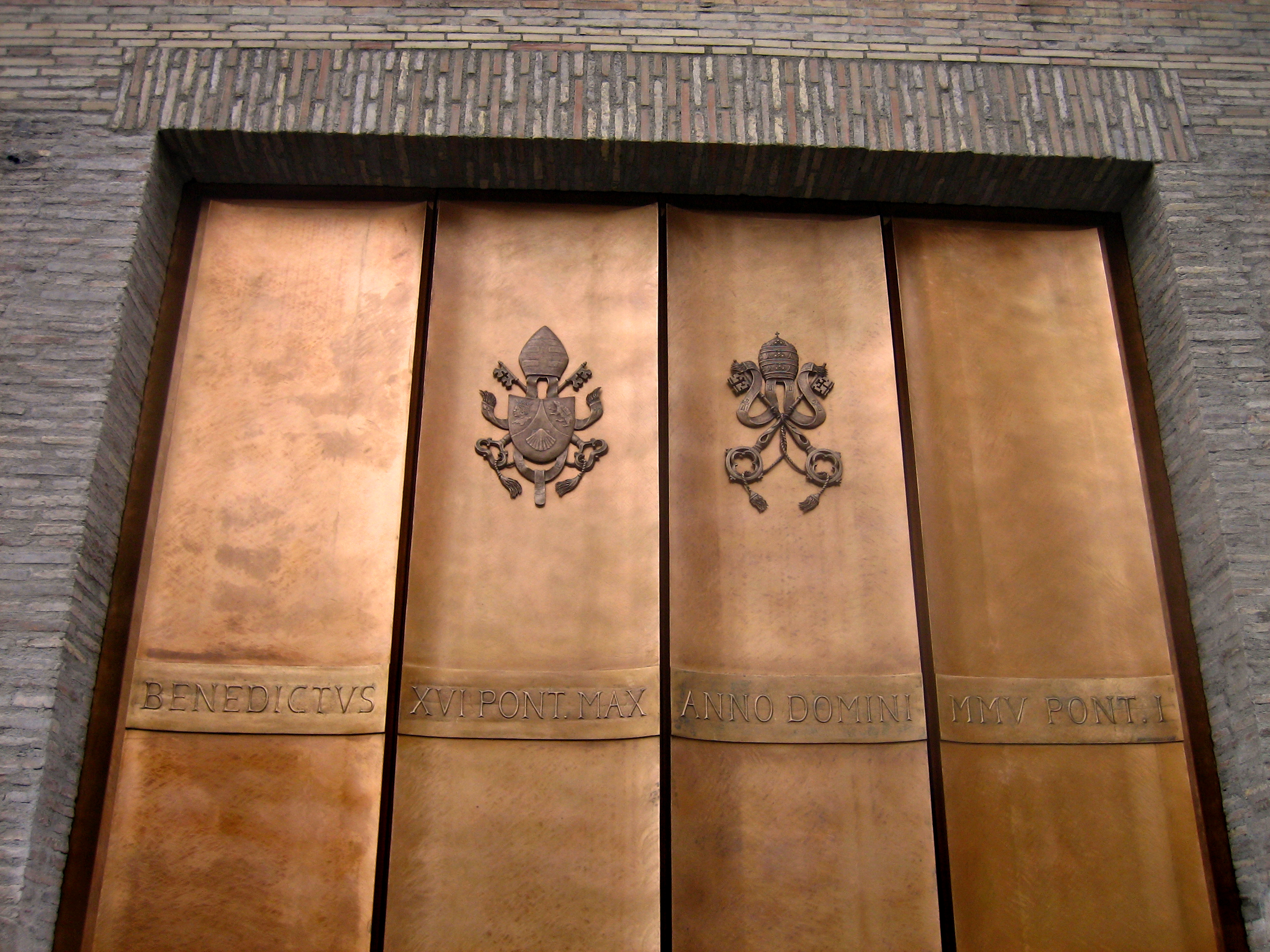
A new door in Vatican City, on which is written "Benedictus XVI Pont (ifex) Max (imus) Anno Domini MMV Pont (ificatus) I.", meaning "Benedict XVI, Pontiff Maximus, in the year of our Lord 2005, in the first year of his pontificate."

The origin of the title is unclear. Since in Latin the term pontiff refers to any high priest, this word was used since the 7th century BCE to designate the highest-ranking priests of the pagan Roman religion, gathered in the College of Pontiffs (Collegium Pontificum). Initially, this was present in the term's translation into other languages, such as Greek: "ἀρχιερεύς" (literally, "high priest") or by a more literal translation as "ἀρχιερεὺς μέγιστος" ("the greatest high priest"). The term "ἀρχιερεύς" was used in the Septuagint text of the Old Testament and is used by the apostles who wrote the New Testament to refer to the Jewish high priest.

Later when St. Jerome translated the Bible into Latin (the Vulgate), the term pontiff was effectively used to refer to the Jewish high priest, being used 59 times in the text. For example, in Mark 15:11, pontiffs (plural) is the Latin term used for "princes of priests," and in the Epistle to the Hebrews, pontiff (singular) is repeatedly used concerning the various Jewish high priests and prophets, and by analogy to Jesus as the high priest of Christians.

The first record of the title "Supreme Pontiff" applied to the pope dates from the 3rd century, during the persecution of the Church, used by Tertullian to refer to Pope Callixtus I (r. 217–222), and it is unclear whether the word was commonly used early in that century as it was later, since Tertullian's usage of the word was unusual. Once Christian bishops took the place of Jewish priests, the term Pontiff was used regularly from the 5th century onwards to refer to notable bishops. For example, Hilary of Arles (m. 449) is called "High Pontiff" (summus pontifex) by Eucherius of Lyon. The Archbishop of Canterbury Lanfranc (m. 1089) is called "Primate and High Pontiff" (Primas et Summus Pontifex), by his biographer, Milo Crispin. Pope Nicholas I (r. 858–867) is called "High Pontiff and Universal Pope" (Summus Pontifex et Universalis Papa) by his legate Arsenius. From then on, examples of the use of the term for popes are common. After the 11th century, it is likely that the title was used only for the bishops of Rome.

The title of Pontifex Maximus was a title of the Roman emperor since the reign of Caesar Augustus, being abdicated by Gratian (375–383). The Encyclopædia Britannica, without citing source, attributes Pope Leo I (r. 440–461) to the use of the title Pontifex Maximus. Other sources, also without documentary proof, claim that the title was first used by Pope Gregory I (r. 590–604), as a demonstration of continuity of civil power after the fall of the Western Roman Empire. However, since popes started using the title "Pontifex Maximus" much later, during the Italian Renaissance in the 15th century, there seems to be no relationship between them.

=== Patriarch of the West ===
From 1863 until 2005, and then from 2024 onward, the Papal Yearbook includes the term "Patriarch of the West" as an official title of the pope. Pope Francis reinstated this title in 2024 after Pope Benedict XVI had it removed in 2006. This expression was first used by Pope Theodore I (r. 642–649) in 642, and since then it has been used only occasionally. The patriarchates of the East, established by the Councils of Constantinople (381) and Chalcedon (451), had their territory delimited, while the territory of the seat of the Bishop of Rome remained vague. In the East, under the imperial ecclesiastical system of the Pentarchy of the Byzantine emperor Justinian I (r. 527–565), together with the four eastern patriarchs (Constantinople, Alexandria, Antioch, and Jerusalem), the Pope was considered the patriarch of the West. In contrast, the popes accepted at that time only three patriarchal sees: Rome, Alexandria, and Antioch, because they were founded by Peter. Without using the title "Patriarch of the West," the Fourth Council of Constantinople (869–870), the Fourth Council of the Lateran (1215), and the Council of Florence (1439) consider the pope only as the first of the five patriarchs.

The title developed in the 16th and 17th centuries, due to the multiplication of papal titles. In 2006, the title ceased to be used, although this does not symbolize a change in the ecumenical relations with the Eastern churches proclaimed by the Second Vatican Council. Pope Francis reinstated the title in 2024.

The title "Patriarch of the West" symbolically designates that the pope has authority over the entire Latin Church, and over the other Latin patriarchs, such as those of Lisbon, Jerusalem, and Venice. However, the term does not describe an ecclesiastical territory or patriarchal definition and has no canonical value. Yet many Catholic and Orthodox theologians, in the interests of ecumenism, use the term to describe the powers of the patriarchal and ordinary character that the pope possesses in the West, such as the appointment of bishops, rather than the powers of an extraordinary and dogmatic character, extended to the whole Church (for example when he speaks "ex-cathedra" - with the full authority of office).

=== Servant of the Servants of God ===
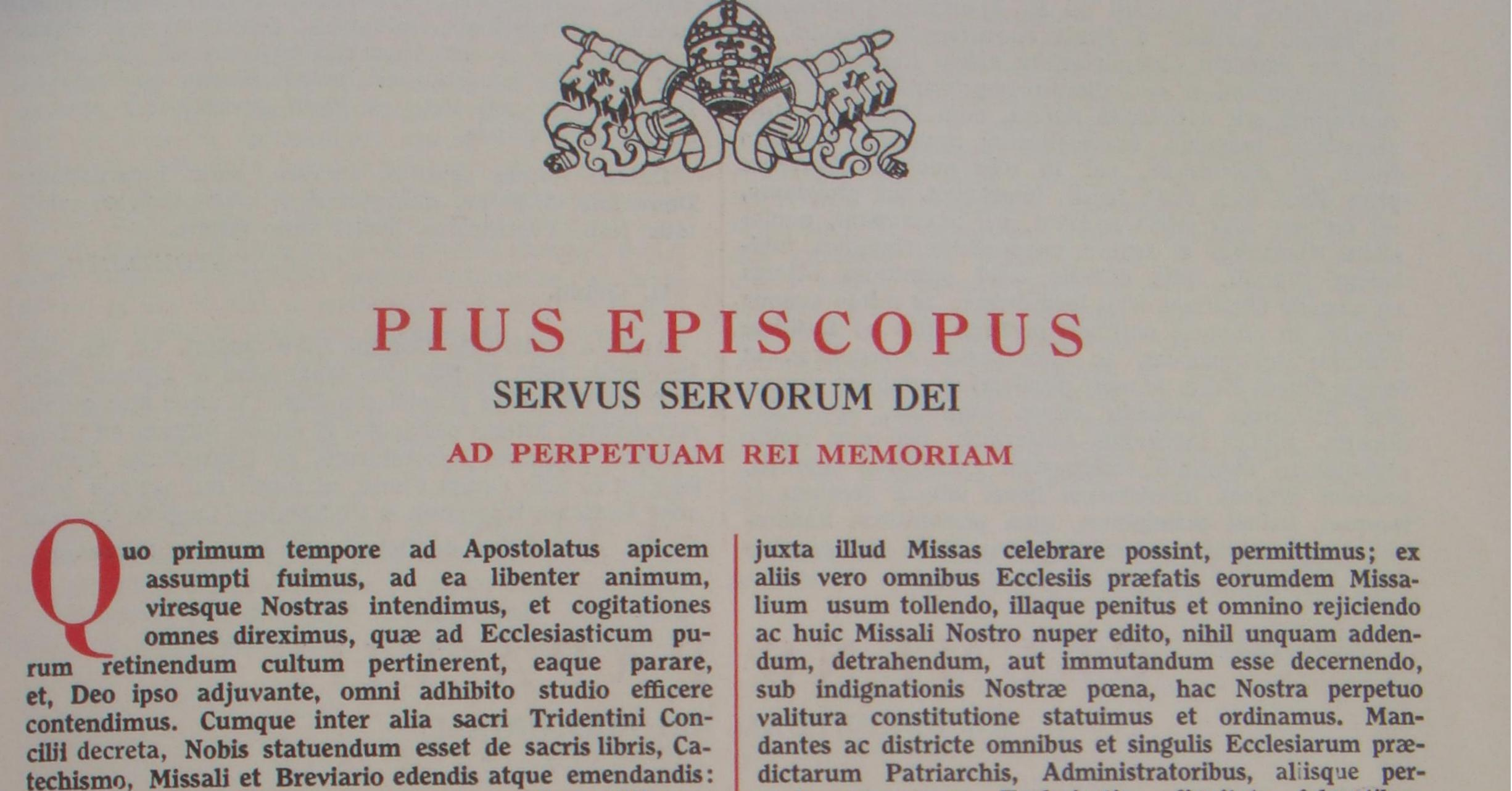
The bull Quo Primum of 1570, by Pope Pius V published in a 1956 Roman Missal. Below the pope's name, Pius Episcopus (Pius Bishop), is written the title "Servant of the Servants of God" (Servus Servorum Dei). Note not all papal documents begin this way, but the bulls do.

The term "Servant of the Servants of God" is a reference to the function and authority of the pope, this title being:

The model and norm for the Petrine ministry exercised by the pope. It involves bearing witness to the faith, overseeing how the local churches preserve that faith, giving help and encouragement to the other bishops in their local and universal ministry of proclaiming the faith, speaking on behalf of the bishops and their local churches, and expressing the faith of the Church on behalf of all the local churches which together constitute the universal Church. In short, the Petrine ministry is that of a servant of the servants of God ..., a servant of his brother bishops and all God's people.

The justification for this title is found in Matthew 20:26–27: "(...) whoever wishes to be great among you, let him be your servant; and whoever wishes to be first, let him be your servant."

The title was first used in the 6th century, by Pope Gregory I (r. 590–610), as a lesson to John the Faster, Patriarch of Constantinople, after the latter assumed the title "Ecumenical Patriarch", claiming power and superiority against the pope. In retaliation, Gregory adopted the title "Servant of the Servants of God," as a demonstration of humility.

Previously, this designation was used by other bishops and secular leaders, such as St. Boniface and the King of Aragon Alfonso II (r. 1162–1196). Its usage became regular for popes from the 9th century onwards, and since the 12th century it has been used exclusively by themselves.

=== Primate of Italy and Metropolitan Archbishop of the Roman Province ===
The title "Metropolitan Archbishop of the Roman Province" (Archiepiscopus Metropolitanus Provinciae Romanae) reflects the fact that the pope is the archbishop of the ecclesiastical province of Rome itself, and "Primate of Italy" (Primatus Italiae), the bishop who heads the national church of Italy.

Both titles came into use in the fifth century, reflecting the pope's duty to head regional councils of bishops from Italy and the province of Rome twice a year. From the eleventh century onward, popes focused more on governing the universal church, setting aside local duties related to these expressions, yet they have been retained among the official papal titles until the present day for historical reasons, being considered a prerogative of honor and not including any responsibility.

=== Sovereign of the Vatican City State ===
The title "Sovereign of the Vatican City State" (Superanus sui Iuris Civitatis Vaticanae) refers to the fact that the pope is the head of state of the Vatican City. The title has come into use since 1929 when the Lateran Treaty created the state. The pope has secular legal authority in all state affairs, and under international law as head of state, has immunity from the jurisdiction of courts of other countries, though not from international tribunals.

== Titles no longer in use ==
=== Apostolic Lord ===
Between the 6th and 11th centuries, "Apostolic Lord" ("Domnus Apostolicus") was used as a reference to the fact that the pope occupied the Sedes apostolica (Apostolic See), a church founded by an Apostle. Although the title is no longer in use as a papal title, it does still occur in the Litany of the Saints: "Ut domnum Apostólicum et ommes ecclesiásticos órdines in sancta religióne conserváre dignéris, te rogámus, audi nos." ("That you would vouchsafe to preserve the Apostolic Lord, and all orders of the Church in holy religion, we beseech you, hear us.").

Originally in the 5th and 6th centuries, in Gaul, the term "Apostolic See" was applied to any local church and "Apostolic Lord" to its Bishops. However, since the late 8th century, the title was commonly reserved for the pope, as can be seen in documentation from Francia and England. At the Council of Reims in 1049, the bishop of Compostela was excommunicated for having used the expression, and it was said to him that "only the pontiff of the Roman See is the primate of the Universal and Apostolic Church."

=== Most Holy Lord ===
The term "Most Holy Lord" ("Sanctissimus Dominus"), variations of which include "Our Lord", "Our Most Holy Lord" or just "Most Holy"; was used occasionally from the mid-12th century until the 19th century. This title had merely protocol value and no theological significance. The expression was used in letters that made some reference to the pope. It is first recorded in the letter of King John of England in 1213 to Pope Innocent III (r. 1198–1216), and is later used in the decrees of the Council of Trent in the 16th century. Its last use is recorded in an instruction of the Apostolic Penitentiary on civil marriage in 1866, referring to Pope Pius IX (r. 1846–1878).

== Non-official titles ==
=== Head of the Church ===
In Catholic ecclesiology, the pope is often called the "Head of the Church" ("Caput Ecclesiae"), the "Visible Head of the Church", or the "Head of the Universal Church", among other variants. Christ himself is the invisible Head of the Church (Colossians 1.18, and Ephesians 4.15). According to Catholic belief, Christ, by giving the leadership of the Church to Peter, made him and his successors the visible Head of the Church. Thus, the bull Unam Sanctam of 1302 establishes that the "Church (...) has (...) only one head, and not two like a monster: it is Christ and Peter, Christ's Vicar, and Peter's successor." In this doctrine, there is a close collaboration between Christology and ecclesiology.

However, there are other variations of the title, which means Peter may also be called the "Head of the Apostolic College" or "Head of the Apostles" indicating that he was the leader of the apostles. The popes in turn are called the "Head of the College of Bishops" or "Head of the Bishops", who succeeded the Apostolic College.

The term "Head of the Church" was originally applied to the Roman Church, indicating its leadership and place in the Mystical Body of Christ and the Universal Church. One of its earliest records appears in the letter "Institutio" by Pope Boniface I (r. 418–422) in 422 to the bishops of Thessaly. However, the term did not come into regular use until the 11th century, the Roman Church being jointly referred to as "mater" ("mother"), "fundamentum" ("foundation"), "cardo" (heart), and "magistra" ("teacher"). From the 13th century onward the title was commonly reserved for the pope.

=== Holy Father ===
The title "Holy Father" ("Sancte Pater"), or fully "Most Holy Father", is historically used in conjunction with the style "His Holiness" and is used in invocations of the pope.

There is no official explanation as to the meaning of this title. It is likely the word "Pater" (Latin, meaning "Father") is just an affectionate allusion to the role of the pope as father and leader of Christians. However, the term Church Father is also used as a title for the great Christian theologians and teachers of the first eight centuries of the Church, who are believed to have provided the correct interpretation of Tradition and distinguished authentic doctrines from heresies. Thus, the application of this expression to the pope may be an allusion to his functions, which are similar to those of the Holy Fathers.

== Form of address ==
The proper style for the Pope is "His Holiness", "Sua Sanctitas" in Latin or "Sua Santità" (in Italian). The form "Your Holiness" is used for speech addressed to him immediately, with "His Holiness" therefore being employed in indirect references. The style is used officially, for example, in letters addressed to the pope.

== See also ==
- Papal name
- Papal renunciation
- History of the papacy
- History of the Catholic Church
- Papacy in early Christianity
