= Pope Anterus =

Head of the Catholic Church from 235 to 236

Pope Saint Anterus
- Bishop of Rome
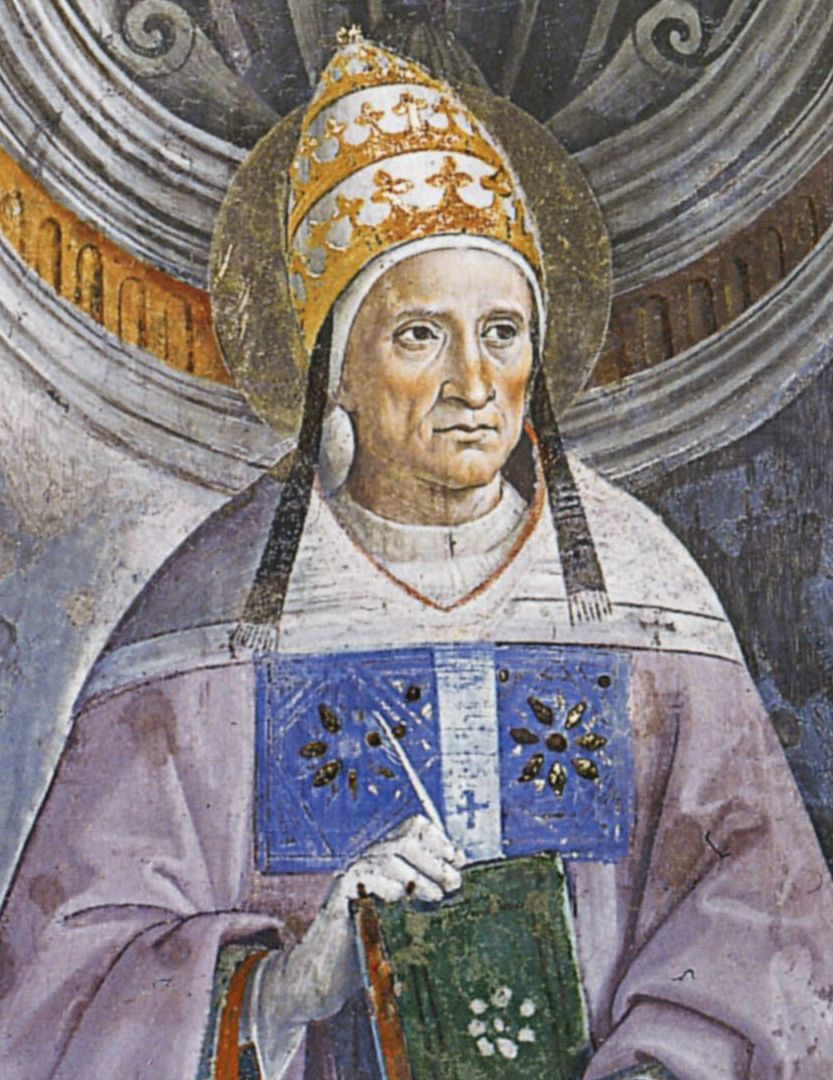
- 15th century mural depicting St. Anterus by Pietro Perugino from the Sistine Chapel
- Church: Catholic Church
- Papacy began: 21 November 235
- Papacy ended: 3 January 236
- Predecessor: Pontian
- Successor: Fabian

Personal details
- Born: Petilia Policastro, Calabria, Italy, Roman Empire
- Died: 3 January 236 Rome, Italy, Roman Empire

Sainthood
- Feast day: 3 January (Roman Catholic); 18 August (Russian Orthodox)

Pope Anterus (Latin: Anterus, Classical Greek: Ανθηρός, romanized: Antheros) was the bishop of Rome from 21 November 235 until his death on 3 January 236.

== Life ==
Anterus was the son of Romulus, born in Petilia Policastro, Calabria, Italy. He is thought to have been of Greek origin, and his name may indicate that he was a freed slave. He succeeded Pope Pontian, who had been deported from Rome to Sardinia, along with the antipope Hippolytus. He created one bishop, for the city of Fondi.

Some scholars believe Anterus was martyred, because he ordered greater strictness in searching into the acts of the martyrs, exactly collected by the notaries appointed by Pope Clement I. Other scholars doubt this and believe it is more likely that he died in undramatic circumstances during the persecutions of Emperor Maximinus the Thracian.

He was buried in the papal crypt of the Catacomb of Callixtus, on the Appian Way in Rome. The site of his sepulchre was discovered by Giovanni Battista de Rossi in 1854, with some broken remnants of the Greek epitaph engraved on the narrow oblong slab that closed his tomb; only the Greek term for bishop was legible. His ashes had been removed to the Church of Saint Sylvester in the Campus Martius and were discovered on 17 November 1595, when Pope Clement VIII rebuilt that church.

Pope Anterus is remembered in the Catholic Church on 3 January and in the Russian Orthodox Church on 18 August.

== See also ==
- List of popes
- List of Catholic saints

Titles of the Great Christian Church
Preceded by Pontian	Bishop of Rome; 235–236	Succeeded by Fabian
