= Pontifex (project) =

1980s aircraft scheduling project

PONTIFEX (Planning Of Non-specific Transportation by an Intelligent Fleet EXpert) was a mid-1980s project that introduced a novel approach to complex aircraft fleet scheduling, partially funded by the European Commission's Strategic Programme for R&D in Information Technology.

Since the mathematical problems stemming from nontrivial fleet scheduling easily become computationally unsolvable, the PONTIFEX idea consisted in a seamless merge of algorithms and heuristic knowledge embedded in rules. The system, based on domain knowledge collected from airliners Alitalia, KLM, Swissair, and TAP Portugal, was first adopted by Swissair and Alitalia in the late 1980s, then also by the Italian railroad national operator, for their cargo division. It was still in use as of 2008.
