= General Roman Calendar of 1954 =

Revision of the General Roman Calendar

In 1954, Pope Pius XII (1939–1958) made changes to the General Roman Calendar, incorporating the same calendar established by Pope Pius X (1903–1914) following his liturgical reforms, as well as changes that were made by Pope Pius XI (1922–1939), such as the institution of the Feast of Christ the King (assigned to the last Sunday in October). Some of Pope Pius the XII's changes include the institution of the Feast of the Immaculate Heart of Mary (August 22, which was previously the octave day of the Assumption of Mary) in 1944, the inscription of Pius X into the General Calendar (September 3) following his 1954 canonization, and the institution of the Feast of the Queenship of Mary (May 31) in October 1954.

The General Calendar of 1954 is generally not authorized for liturgical use by traditional groups in communion with the Holy See. Some sedevacantists continue to use it, as well as Old Roman Catholics, as their members consider it to be the last calendar before the revisions that began in 1955. Indults have been granted, however, to certain communities in full communion with Rome, such as some apostolates of the Institute of Christ the King Sovereign Priest and the Priestly Fraternity of Saint Peter.

== Rank of feast days ==
The ranking of feast day had grown from an original division between doubles and simples. By the time of the Tridentine calendar it included semidoubles and, later, the distinction between first and second class doubles. In 1604, Pope Clement VIII added the new rank of greater double. In 1955, Pope Pius XII abolished the rank of semidouble.

The rank of feast days determines which Mass is said when two feast days occur on the one day, as well as when a feast day falls on Sundays or certain other privileged days. Feast days were classified as Simple, Semidouble, or Double, with feast days of the Double Rite further divided into Double of the I Class, Double of the II Class, Greater Double or Major Double, and Double, in order of descending rank. On ferias and many feast days of simple rank, the celebrant was permitted to substitute a Mass of his own choice such as a votive Mass, or a Mass for the Dead.

What the original meaning of the term "double" may have been is not entirely certain. Some think that the greater festivals were thus styled because the antiphons before and after the psalms were "doubled", i.e. twice repeated entire on these days. Others, with more probability, point to the fact that before the ninth century in certain places, for example at Rome, it was customary on the greater feast days to recite two sets of Matins, the one of the feria or week-day, the other of the festival. Hence such days were known as "doubles".

The Catholic Encyclopedia of the early years of the twentieth century shows the incremental crowding of the calendar (which had increased further by 1954) in the following table based on the official revisions of the Roman Breviary in 1568, 1602, 1631, 1882 and on the situation in 1907.

Pope	Date	Doubles, I Class	Doubles, II Class	Greater Doubles	Doubles	Semidoubles	Total
Pius V	1568	19	17	0	53	60	149
Clement VIII	1602	19	18	16	43	68	164
Urban VIII	1631	19	18	16	45	78	176
Leo XIII	1882	21	18	24	128	74	275
-	1907	23	27	25	133	72	280

In 1907, when, in accordance with the rules in force since the time of Pope Pius V, feast days of any form of double, if impeded by falling on the same day with a feast day of higher class, were transferred to another day, this classification of feast days was of great practical importance for deciding which feast day to celebrate on any particular day. Pope Pius X simplified matters considerably in his 1911 reform of the Roman Breviary. In the case of occurrence the lower-ranking feast day could become a commemoration within the celebration of the higher-ranking one. Further retouches were made by Pope Pius XII in 1955, Pope John XXIII in 1960, and Pope Paul VI in 1969.

=== Sundays ===
Sundays were divided into greater and lesser Sundays, with the greater Sundays being further divided into two classes. The Greater Sundays of the I class were the I Sunday of Advent, the four Sundays of Lent, Passion Sunday, Palm Sunday, Easter Sunday, Low Sunday, and Pentecost. No feast day whatsoever could be celebrated on these days, although they admitted commemorations except on Easter and Pentecost. Greater Sundays of the II class permitted the celebration of Doubles of the I Class only, and consisted of the other three Sundays in Advent and the three pre-Lenten Sundays. All other Sundays (II to V after Easter and the Sundays after Epiphany and Pentecost, except for those that might occur during an Octave, which followed the rules for the Octave), were lesser Sundays or Sundays per annum ("through the year"), and only the celebration of Doubles of the I or II Class, or a feast of the Lord, took precedence over them. The Sunday within the Octave of the Nativity was a special case, due to the fixed date of Christmas and the high rank of the feast days following it. If December 29, 30, or 31 were a Sunday, the Mass assigned to it was celebrated on that day; otherwise, it was celebrated on December 30.

Before the reform of Pope Pius X in 1911, ordinary Doubles took precedence over most of the Semidouble Sundays, resulting in many of the Sunday Masses rarely being said. While retaining the Semidouble rite for Sundays, the reform permitted only the most important feast days, Doubles of the I or II class, to be celebrated on Sunday. When a feast of the rank of double of the I or II class fell on a Sunday, the Mass would be that of the feast, with a commemoration of the occurring Sunday; the Gospel of the omitted Sunday Mass would be read at the end of Mass instead of the usual Gospel "In principio erat Verbum" of St. John. When a feast of a rank lower than that occurred with a Sunday, the feast would be commemorated in the Sunday Mass by including a commemoration of the feast, and its Gospel would be read at the end of Mass, provided it was a "proper" Gospel, i.e. one not taken from the Common.

Following the reform of Pope Pius X, only three feasts were assigned to a Sunday: the feast days of the Holy Name, the Holy Family, and the Most Holy Trinity. A fourth, Christ the King, was added in 1925.

=== Ferias ===
Ferias also were classified into three categories:

- Greater privileged ferias: Ash Wednesday and Monday, Tuesday, and Wednesday of Holy Week. No feast day could be celebrated on these days.
- Greater non-privileged ferias: The ferias of Advent, Lent, and Passion Week, Rogation Monday, and the Ember Days. Any feast day except a Simple could occur on these days, with a commemoration of the feria.
- On all other ferias, any feast day of whatever rank could be celebrated without any commemoration of the feria.

Ember Days are four separate sets of three days within the same week — specifically, the Wednesday, Friday, and Saturday — roughly equidistant in the circuit of the year, that were formerly set aside for fasting and prayer. These days set apart for special prayer and fasting were considered especially suitable for the ordination of clergy. The Ember Days are known in Latin as quatuor tempora (the "four seasons"), or jejunia quatuor temporum ("fasts of the four seasons"). They occur in the weeks between the third and fourth Sundays of Advent, between the first and second Sundays of Lent, between Pentecost and Trinity Sunday, and beginning the first Wednesday after the Exaltation of the Holy Cross (September 14), which is between the liturgical third and fourth Sundays of September. (Note: The rubrics of the Breviary defined the liturgical first Sunday of August, September, October and November, which primarily determined which books of Scripture were read during that week at Matins, as the Sunday closest to the first day of the month, in this manner: "That which is called the I Sunday of the month, is that which is on the Kalends, or nearest the Kalends of that month: so that, if the Kalends be Monday, Tuesday, or Wednesday, then the I Sunday of the month, on which the book of Scripture to be begun is placed, is that which precedes the Kalends. But if Thursday or Friday, or Saturday, it is that which follows." The first Sunday of September, therefore, could fall between 29 August and 4 September. The 1960 reforms changed this to the actual first Sunday of the month, which also adjusted the possible dates of the September Ember Days.)

Rogation Days are, in the calendar of the Western Church, four days traditionally set apart for solemn processions to invoke God's mercy. They are April 25, the Major Rogation (or Greater Litanies), coinciding with St. Mark's Day (but transferred to the following Tuesday if they fell on Easter); and the three days preceding Ascension Thursday, the Minor Rogations (or Lesser Litanies). These are indicated below in the main body of the calendar and in the Movable Feasts section.

=== Vigils ===
In the Tridentine calendar the vigils of Christmas, the Epiphany, and Pentecost were called "major vigils"; the rest were "minor" or "common" vigils In early times, every feast day had a vigil, but the increase in the number of feast days and abuses connected with the evening and night service of which the vigils originally consisted, led to their diminishment. Nevertheless, the Roman Rite kept many more vigils than other Latin liturgical rites such as the Ambrosian Rite and the Mozarabic Rite. If a Vigil fell on a Sunday, it was transferred to the previous Saturday, although the Vigil of Christmas took precedence over the IV Sunday of Advent.

Prior to the suppression of some vigils by Pope Pius XII in 1955, there were three classes of Vigils. The Vigils of Christmas and Pentecost were of the I class, and took precedence over any feast day. The Vigil of Epiphany was of the II class, and permitted only Doubles of the I or II classes, or any feast of the Lord. All other vigils were "common" and took precedence only over ferias and Simple feast days, but were anticipated on Saturday if they fell on Sunday. Most feasts of the Apostles had Vigils; the exceptions being those that fell in Eastertide, when Vigils were not permitted. The Vigil of St. Matthias was unique, in that it was normally commemorated on February 23, the feast day of St. Peter Damian, but in leap year, was kept on February 24, the traditional leap day of the Roman calendar.

=== Octaves ===
The Tridentine calendar had many octaves, without any indication in the calendar itself of distinction of rank between them, apart from the fact that the Octave Day (the final day of the octave) was ranked higher than the days within the octave. Several octaves overlapped, so that, for instance, on 29 December the prayer of the saint of the day, Saint Thomas Becket, was followed by the prayers of Christmas, of Saint Stephen, of Saint John the Evangelist and of the Holy Innocents. The situation remained such until the reform of Pope Pius X.

To cut down on the monotony of repeating the same prayers in Mass and Office every day for eight days, Pope Pius X classified the octaves as "privileged", "common" or "simple"

The privileged octaves were of three "ranks". (Note: Ordo" in Latin, not "classis" (class), the word used for feast days, the word that was also used in Pope John XXIII's revision of the rubrics for all kinds of liturgical days.) The first rank belonged to the octaves of Easter and Pentecost (no feast day could be celebrated in these octaves or even, until Vespers on Tuesday, be commemorated), the second to those of Epiphany and Corpus Christi (the Octave Day ranked as a Greater Double, the days within the octave as Semidoubles, giving way only to Doubles of the I Class, and on the Octave day itself only to a Double of the I class that was celebrated in the entire Church), the third rank to those of Christmas, the Ascension, and the Sacred Heart (these gave way to any feast day above the level of Simple).

The common octaves were those of the Immaculate Conception, the Assumption, the Nativity of Saint John the Baptist, the Solemnity of Saint Joseph, Saints Peter and Paul, and All Saints, as well as, locally, the principal patron saint of a church, cathedral, order, town, diocese, province, or nation. These too gave way to any feast day above the level of Simple; the difference between these and the third privileged rank was that ferial psalms were said during common octaves, while the psalms from the feast day were used during privileged octaves.

The simple octaves were those of Saint Stephen, Saint John the Evangelist, the Holy Innocents, Saint Lawrence, the Nativity of Mary and, locally, secondary patrons. These were all Doubles of the II class, their Octave day was a Simple and, in contrast to the situation before Pope Pius X, their Mass was not repeated nor a Commemoration made, except on the Octave day, as simple Octaves had no days within the Octave.

In Pope Pius XII's reform, only the octaves of Christmas, Easter and Pentecost were kept. The days within the Easter and Pentecost octaves were raised to double rite, had precedence over all feast days, and did not admit commemorations.

== January ==
- 1: Circumcision of the Lord and Octave of the Nativity, Double of the II Class.
- 2: Octave of St. Stephen Protomartyr, Simple.
- 3: Octave of St. John Apostle and Evangelist, Simple.
- 4: Octave of the Holy Innocents Martyrs, Simple.
- 5: Vigil of the Epiphany, Semidouble, Com. of St. Telesphorus Pope and Martyr.
- 6: Epiphany of the Lord, Double of the I Class with a privileged Octave of the II rank.
- 7: Of the II day within the Octave of the Epiphany, Semidouble.
- 8: Of the III day within the Octave of the Epiphany, Semidouble.
- 9: Of the IV day within the Octave of the Epiphany, Semidouble.
- 10: Of the V day within the Octave of the Epiphany, Semidouble.
- 11: Of the VI day within the Octave of the Epiphany, Semidouble, Com. of St. Hyginus Pope and Martyr.
- 12: Of the VII day within the Octave of the Epiphany, Semidouble.
- 13: Octave of the Epiphany, Greater Double.
- 14: St. Hilary Bishop, Confessor, and Doctor of the Church, Double, Com. of St. Felix Priest and Martyr.
- 15: St. Paul first hermit, Confessor, Double, Com. of St. Maurus.
- 16: St. Marcellus I Pope and Martyr, Semidouble.
- 17: St. Anthony Abbot, Double.
- 18: Chair of St. Peter Apostle at Rome, Greater Double, Com. of St. Paul Apostle, and of St. Prisca Virgin and Martyr.
- 19: Ss. Marius, Martha, Audifax, and Abachum Martyrs, Simple, Com. of St. Canute, Martyr.
- 20: Ss. Fabian Pope and Sebastian Martyrs, Double.
- 21: St. Agnes, Roman Virgin and Martyr, Double
- 22: Ss. Vincent and Anastasius Martyrs, Semidouble.
- 23: St. Raymund of Peñafort Confessor, Semidouble, Com. of St. Emerentiana Virgin and Martyr.
- 24: St. Timothy Bishop and Martyr, Double.
- 25: Conversion of St. Paul Apostle, Greater Double, Com. of St. Peter.
- 26: St. Polycarp Bishop and Martyr, Double.
- 27: St. John Chrysostom Bishop, Confessor, and Doctor of the Church, Double.
- 28: St. Peter Nolasco Confessor, Double, Com. of St. Agnes Virgin and Martyr second.
- 29: St. Francis de Sales Bishop, Confessor, and Doctor of the Church, Double.
- 30: St. Martina Virgin and Martyr, Semidouble.
- 31: St. John Bosco Confessor, Double.

Sunday between the Circumcision and Epiphany [or January 2, when no such Sunday occurs]: The most holy Name of Jesus, Double of the II Class.
Sunday within the Octave of the Epiphany: The Most Holy Family of Jesus, Mary, Joseph, Greater Double.

== February ==
- 1: St. Ignatius Bishop and Martyr, Double.
- 2: Purification of the Blessed Virgin Mary, Double of the II Class.
- 3: St. Blase Bishop and Martyr, Simple.
- 4: St. Andrew Corsini Bishop and Confessor, Double.
- 5: St. Agatha Virgin Martyr, Double.
- 6: St. Titus Bishop and Confessor, Double, Com. of St. Dorothy Virgin Martyr.
- 7: St. Romuald Abbot, Double.
- 8: St. John of Matha Confessor, Double.
- 9: St. Cyril Bishop of Alexandria, Confessor, and Doctor of the Church, Double, Com. of St. Apollonia Virgin Martyr.
- 10: St. Scholastica Virgin, Double.
- 11: Apparition of the Blessed Virgin Mary Immaculate, Greater Double.
- 12: The Seven Holy Founders of the Order of Servants of the Blessed Virgin Mary Confessors, Double.
- 13: Feria
- 14: St. Valentine Priest and Martyr, Simple.
- 15: Ss. Faustinus and Jovita Martyrs, Simple.
- 16: Feria
- 17: Feria
- 18: St. Simeon Bishop and Martyr, Simple.
- 19: Feria
- 20: Feria
- 21: Feria
- 22: Chair of St. Peter at Antioch, Greater Double, Com. of St. Paul.
- 23: St. Peter Damian Bishop, Confessor, and Doctor of the Church, Double, Com. of the Vigil.
- 24: St. Matthias Apostle, Double of the II Class.
- 25: Feria
- 26: Feria
- 27: St. Gabriel of Our Lady of Sorrows, Double
- 28: Feria

In leap year the month of February is of 29 days, and the Feast of St. Matthias is celebrated on the 25th day and the Feast of St. Gabriel of Our Lady of Sorrows on the 28th day of February, and twice is said Sexto Kalendas, that is on the 24th day and 25th day; and the dominical letter, which was taken up in the month of January, is changed to the preceding; that, if in January, the dominical letter was A, it is changed to the preceding, which is g, etc.; and the letter f is kept twice, on the 24th and 25th. (Note: Kalendarium, Breviarium Romanum; Ecclesiastical Latin: "In anno bissextili mensis Februarius est dierum 29, et Festum S. Matthiae celebratur die 25 ac Festum S. Gabrielis a Virgine Perdolente die 28 Febr., et bis dicitur Sexto Kalendas, id est die 24 et die 25; et littera dominicalis, quae assumpta fuit in mense Januario, mutatur in praecedentem; ut, si in Januario, littera dominicalis fuerit A, mutetur in praecedentem, quae est g, etc.; et littera f bis servit, 24 et 25. English, "In a leap year, the month of February has 29 days, and the Feast of St. Matthias is celebrated on the 25th and the Feast of St. Gabriel of the Sorrowful Virgin on the 28th of February, and the Sexto Kalendas is said twice, that is, on the 24th and the 25th; and the dominical letter, which was assumed in the month of January, is changed to the preceding one; so that, if in January, the dominical letter was A, it is changed to the preceding one, which is g, etc.; and the letter f is used twice, 24th and 25th")

== March ==
- 1: Feria
- 2: Feria
- 3: Feria
- 4: St. Casimir Confessor, Semidouble, Com. of St. Lucius I Pope and Martyr.
- 5: Feria
- 6: Ss. Perpetua and Felicity Martyrs, Double.
- 7: St. Thomas Aquinas Confessor and Doctor of the Church, Double.
- 8: St. John of God Confessor, Double.
- 9: St. Frances of Rome Widow, Double.
- 10: The Forty Holy Martyrs, Semidouble.
- 11: Feria
- 12: St. Gregory I Pope, Confessor, and Doctor of the Church, Double.
- 13: Feria
- 14: Feria
- 15: Feria
- 16: Feria
- 17: St. Patrick Bishop and Confessor, Double.
- 18: St. Cyril Bishop of Jerusalem, Confessor, and Doctor of the Church, Double.
- 19: St. Joseph, Spouse of the Blessed Virgin Mary, Confessor, and Patron of the Universal Church, Double of the I Class.
- 20: Feria
- 21: St. Benedict Abbot, Greater Double.
- 22: Feria
- 23: Feria
- 24: St. Gabriel the Archangel, Greater Double.
- 25: Annunciation of the Blessed Virgin Mary, Double of the I Class.
- 26: Feria
- 27: St. John Damascene Confessor and Doctor of the Church, Double.
- 28: St. John Capistran Confessor, Semidouble.
- 29: Feria
- 30: Feria
- 31: Feria

Friday after Passion Sunday: Seven Sorrows of the Blessed Virgin Mary, Greater Double, Com. of the Feria.

== April ==
- 1: Feria
- 2: St. Francis of Paula Confessor, Double.
- 3: Feria
- 4: St. Isidore Bishop, Confessor, and Doctor of the Church, Double.
- 5: St. Vincent Ferrer Confessor, Double.
- 6: Feria
- 7: Feria
- 8: Feria
- 9: Feria
- 10: Feria
- 11: St. Leo I Pope, Confessor, and Doctor of the Church, Double.
- 12: Feria
- 13: St. Hermenegild Martyr, Semidouble.
- 14: St. Justin Martyr, Double, Com. of Saints Tiburtius, Valerian and Maximus, Martyrs.
- 15: Feria
- 16: Feria
- 17: St. Anicetus Pope and Martyr, Simple.
- 18: Feria
- 19: Feria
- 20: Feria
- 21: St. Anselm Bishop, Confessor, and Doctor of the Church, Double.
- 22: Ss. Soter and Cajus Popes and Martyrs, Semidouble.
- 23: St. George Martyr, Semidouble.
- 24: St. Fidelis of Sigmaringen Martyr, Double.
- 25: St. Mark Evangelist, Double of the II Class.
- 26: Ss. Cletus and Marcellinus Popes and Martyrs, Semidouble.
- 27: St. Peter Canisius Confessor and Doctor of the Church, Double.
- 28: St. Paul of the Cross Confessor, Double, Com. of St. Vitalis Martyr.
- 29: St. Peter Martyr, Double.
- 30: St. Catherine of Siena Virgin, Double.

Wednesday within the second week after the Octave of Easter: Solemnity of St. Joseph, Spouse of the Blessed Virgin Mary, Confessor, and Patron of the Universal Church, Double of the I Class with a common Octave (from 1871 to 1954)

== May ==
- 1: Ss. Philip and James Apostles, Double of the II Class.
- 2: St. Athanasius, Bishop, Confessor, and Doctor of the Church, Double.
- 3: Invention of the Holy Cross, Double of the II Class, Com. of Ss. Alexander, Pope, Eventius and Theodulus Martyrs, and Juvenal, Bishop and Confessor.
- 4: St. Monica Widow, Double.
- 5: St. Pius V Pope and Confessor, Double.
- 6: St. John Apostle before the Latin Gate, Greater Double.
- 7: St. Stanislaus Bishop and Martyr, Double.
- 8: Apparition of St. Michael, Greater Double
- 9: St. Gregory Nazianzen Bishop, Confessor, and Doctor of the Church, Double.
- 10: St. Antoninus Bishop and Confessor, Double, Com. of Ss. Gordian and Epimachus Martyrs.
- 11: Feria
- 12: Ss. Nereus, Achilleus, Domitilla Virgin, and Pancras Martyrs, Semidouble.
- 13: St. Robert Bellarmine Bishop, Confessor, and Doctor of the Church, Double.
- 14: St. Boniface Martyr, Simple.
- 15: St. John Baptist de la Salle Confessor, Double.
- 16: St. Ubald Bishop and Confessor, Semidouble.
- 17: St. Paschal Baylon Confessor, Double.
- 18: St. Venantius Martyr, Double.
- 19: St. Peter Celestine Pope and Confessor, Double, Com. of St. Pudentiana Virgin.
- 20: St. Bernardine of Siena Confessor, Semidouble.
- 21: Feria
- 22: Feria
- 23: Feria
- 24: Feria
- 25: St. Gregory VII Pope and Confessor, Double, Com. of St. Urban I Pope and Martyr, Double.
- 26: St. Philip Neri Confessor, Double, Com. of St. Eleutherius Pope and Martyr.
- 27: St. Bede the Venerable Confessor and Doctor of the Church, Com. of St. John I Pope and Martyr, Double.
- 28: St. Augustine Bishop and Confessor, Double.
- 29: St. Mary Magdalen de Pazzi Virgin, Semidouble.
- 30: St. Felix I Pope and Martyr, Simple.
- 31: Blessed Virgin Mary, Queen Double of the II Class, Com. of St. Petronilla Virgin.

== June ==
- 1: St. Angela Merici Virgin, Double.
- 2: Ss. Marcellinus, Peter, and Erasmus Bishop, Martyrs, Simple.
- 3: Feria
- 4: St. Francis Caracciolo Confessor, Double.
- 5: St. Boniface Bishop and Martyr, Double.
- 6: St. Norbert Bishop and Confessor, Double.
- 7: Feria
- 8: Feria
- 9: Ss. Primus and Felician Martyrs, Simple.
- 10: St. Margaret Queen, Widow, Semidouble.
- 11: St. Barnabas Apostle, Greater Double.
- 12: St. John of San Facundo Confessor, Double, Com. of Ss. Basilides, Cyrinus, Nabor and Nazarius Martyrs.
- 13: St. Anthony of Padua Confessor and Doctor of the Church, Double.
- 14: St. Basil the Great Bishop, Confessor, and Doctor of the Church, Double.
- 15: Ss. Vitus, Modestus, and Crescentia Martyrs, Simple.
- 16: Feria
- 17: Feria
- 18: St. Ephraem Syrus Deacon, Confessor, and Doctor of the Church, Double, Com. of Ss. Mark and Marcellianus Martyrs.
- 19: St. Juliana Falconieri Virgin, Double, Com. of Ss. Gervase and Protase Martyrs.
- 20: St. Silverius Pope and Martyr, Simple.
- 21: St. Aloysius Gonzaga Confessor, Double.
- 22: St. Paulinus Bishop and Confessor, Double
- 23: Vigil.
- 24: The Nativity of St. John the Baptist, Double of the I Class with a common Octave.
- 25: St. William Abbot, Double, Com. of the Octave.
- 26: Ss. John and Paul Martyrs, Double, Com. of the Octave.
- 27: Of the IV day within the Octave of St. John the Baptist, Semidouble.
- 28: St. Irenaeus Bishop and Martyr, Double, Com. of the Octave and of the Vigil.
- 29: Ss. Peter and Paul Apostles, Double of the I Class with a common Octave.
- 30: Commemoration of St. Paul Apostle, Greater Double, Com. of St. Peter Apostle and of the Octave of St. John the Baptist.

== July ==
- 1: The Most Precious Blood of our Lord Jesus Christ, Double of the I Class, Com. of the Octave day of St. John the Baptist.
- 2: Visitation of the Blessed Virgin Mary, Double of the II Class, Com. of Ss. Processus and Martinian Martyrs.
- 3: St. Leo II Pope and Confessor, Semidouble, Com. of the Octave of the Holy Apostles.
- 4: Of the VI day within the Octave of Ss. Peter and Paul Apostles, Semidouble.
- 5: St. Anthony Mary Zaccaria Confessor, Double, Com. of the Octave of the Holy Apostles.
- 6: Octave of Ss. Peter and Paul Apostles, Greater Double.
- 7: Ss. Cyril and Methodius Bishops and Confessors, Double.
- 8: St. Elizabeth Queen, Widow, Semidouble.
- 9: Feria
- 10: The Seven Holy Brothers Martyrs, Semidouble, and Ss. Rufina and Secunda Virgins and Martyrs.
- 11: St. Pius I Pope and Martyr, Simple.
- 12: St. John Gualbert Abbot, Double, Com. of Ss. Nabor and Felix Martyrs.
- 13: St. Anacletus Pope and Martyr, Semidouble.
- 14: St. Bonaventure Bishop, Confessor, and Doctor of the Church, Double.
- 15: St. Henry II Emperor, Confessor, Semidouble.
- 16: Commemoration of the Blessed Virgin Mary of Mt. Carmel, Greater Double.
- 17: St. Alexius Confessor, Semidouble.
- 18: St. Camillus de Lellis Confessor, Double, Com. of St. Symphorosa and her seven Sons Martyrs.
- 19: St. Vincent de Paul Confessor, Double.
- 20: St. Jerome Emiliani Confessor, Double, Com. of St. Margaret Virgin Martyr.
- 21: St. Praxedes Virgin, Simple.
- 22: St. Mary Magdalene Penitent, Double.
- 23: St. Apollinaris Martyr, Double, Com. of St. Liborius Bishop and Confessor.
- 24: Vigil. Com. of St. Christina Virgin and Martyr.
- 25: St. James Apostle, Double of the II Class, Com. of St. Christopher Martyr.
- 26: St. Anne Mother of the Blessed Virgin Mary, Double of the II Class.
- 27: St. Pantaleon Martyr, Simple.
- 28: Ss. Nazarius and Celsus Martyrs, Victor I Pope and Martyr, and St. Innocent I Pope and Confessor, Semidouble.
- 29: St. Martha Virgin, Semidouble, Com. of Ss. Felix II Pope, (Note: It is perhaps unclear when the identification of the Saint Felix of 29 July with Antipope Felix II was abandoned. The identification is still found in the 1920 typical edition of the Roman Missal, with feasts updated to the late 1920s Archived 2020-03-01 at the Wayback Machine, but does not appear in the 1962 typical edition, which calls him simply a martyr (see General Roman Calendar of 1960). The 1952 Marietti printing of the Missal, which precedes 1954, the reference year for this article, also omits the numeral "II" and the word "Papae", however, the 1952 Pustet and the 1956 Typis Polyglottis Vaticanis printings of the Breviary still list Felix as a Pope and with the numeral II. The baselessness of the identification was recognized long before: in its 1909 article on Felix II the Catholic Encyclopedia referred to this identification as a "distortion of the true facts".) Simplicius, Faustinus, and Beatrice Martyrs.
- 30: Ss. Abdon and Sennen Martyrs, Simple.
- 31: St. Ignatius Confessor, Greater Double.

== August ==
- 1: St. Peter in Chains, Greater Double, Com. of St. Paul and the Holy Machabees Martyrs.
- 2: St. Alphonsus Mary of Liguori Bishop, Confessor, and Doctor of the Church, Double, Com. of St. Stephen I Pope and Martyr.
- 3: Invention of St. Stephen Protomartyr, Semidouble.
- 4: St. Dominic Confessor, Greater Double.
- 5: Dedication of Our Lady of the Snows, Greater Double.
- 6: Transfiguration of our Lord Jesus Christ, Double of the II Class, Com. of Ss. Sixtus II Pope, Felicissimus and Agapitus Martyrs.
- 7: St. Cajetan Confessor, Double, Com. of St. Donatus Bishop and Martyr.
- 8: Ss. Cyriacus, Largus and Smaragdus Martyrs, Semidouble.
- 9: St. John Vianney Confessor and Priest, Double, Com. of the Vigil and St. Romanus Martyr.
- 10: St. Laurence Martyr, Double of the II Class with a simple Octave.
- 11: Ss. Tiburtius and Susanna Virgin, Martyrs, Simple.
- 12: St. Clare Virgin, Double.
- 13: Ss. Hippolytus and Cassian Martyrs, Simple.
- 14: Vigil. Com. of St. Eusebius Confessor.
- 15: Assumption of the Blessed Virgin Mary, Double of the I Class with a common Octave.
- 16: St. Joachim Father of the Blessed Virgin Mary, Confessor, Double of the II Class.
- 17: St. Hyacinth Confessor, Double, Com. of the Octave of the Assumption and the Octave Day of St. Laurence.
- 18: Of the IV day within the Octave of the Assumption, Semidouble, Com. of St. Agapitus Martyr.
- 19: St. John Eudes Confessor, Double, Com. of the Octave of the Assumption.
- 20: St. Bernard Abbot, Confessor, and Doctor of the Church, Double, Com. of the Octave of the Assumption.
- 21: St. Jane Frances de Chantal Widow, Double, Com. of the Octave of the Assumption.
- 22: Immaculate Heart of the Blessed Virgin Mary, Double of the II Class, Com. of Ss. Timothy, Hippolytus Bishop, and Symphorianus Martyrs.
- 23: St. Philip Benizi Confessor, Double, Com. of the Vigil.
- 24: St. Bartholomew Apostle, Double of the II Class.
- 25: St. Louis King, Confessor, Semidouble.
- 26: St. Zephyrinus Pope Martyr, Simple.
- 27: St. Joseph Calasanctius Confessor, Double.
- 28: St. Augustine Bishop, Confessor, and Doctor of the Church, Double, Com. of St. Hermes Martyr.
- 29: Beheading of St. John the Baptist, Greater Double, Com. of St. Sabina Martyr.
- 30: St. Rose of St. Mary Virgin of Lima, Double, Com. of Ss. Felix and Adauctus Martyrs.
- 31: St. Raymond Nonnatus Confessor, Double.

== September ==
- 1: St. Giles Abbot, Simple, Com. of the Holy Twelve Brothers Martyrs.
- 2: St. Stephen King, Confessor, Semidouble.
- 3: St. Pius X Pope and Confessor, Double.
- 4: Feria
- 5: St. Laurence Justinian Bishop and Confessor, Semidouble.
- 6: Feria
- 7: Feria
- 8: Nativity of the Blessed Virgin Mary, Double of the II Class with a simple Octave, Com. of St. Adrian Martyr.
- 9: St. Gorgonius Martyr, Simple.
- 10: St. Nicholas of Tolentino Confessor, Double.
- 11: Ss. Protus and Hyacinth Martyrs, Simple.
- 12: The Most Holy Name of Mary, Greater Double.
- 13: Feria
- 14: Exaltation of the Holy Cross, Greater Double.
- 15: Seven Sorrows of the Blessed Virgin Mary, Double of the II Class, Com. of St. Nicomedes Martyr.
- 16: St. Cornelius Pope and St. Cyprian Bishop, Martyrs, Semidouble, Com. of Ss. Euphemia Virgin, Lucy and Geminian Martyrs.
- 17: Impression of the sacred Stigmata of St. Francis Confessor, Double.
- 18: St. Joseph of Cupertino Confessor, Double.
- 19: St. Januarius Bishop and Companions Martyrs, Double.
- 20: St. Eustace and Companions Martyrs, Double, Com. of the Vigil.
- 21: St. Matthew Apostle and Evangelist, Double of the II Class.
- 22: St. Thomas of Villanova Bishop and Confessor, Double, Com. of Ss. Maurice and Companions Martyrs.
- 23: St. Linus Pope and Martyr, Semidouble, Com. of St. Thecla Virgin and Martyr.
- 24: Our Lady of Ransom, Greater Double.
- 25: Feria
- 26: Ss. Cyprian and Justina Virgin, Martyrs, Simple.
- 27: Ss. Cosmas and Damian Martyrs, Semidouble.
- 28: St. Wenceslaus Duke, Martyr, Semidouble.
- 29: Dedication of St. Michael Archangel, Double of the I Class.
- 30: St. Jerome Priest, Confessor, and Doctor of the Church, Double.

== October ==
- 1: St. Remigius Bishop and Confessor, Simple.
- 2: The Holy Guardian Angels, Greater Double.
- 3: St. Teresa of the Child Jesus Virgin, Double.
- 4: St. Francis of Assisi Confessor, Greater Double.
- 5: St. Placid and companions Martyrs, Simple.
- 6: St. Bruno Confessor, Double.
- 7: The most Holy Rosary of the Blessed Virgin Mary, Double of the II Class, Com. of St. Mark Pope and Confessor, and Ss. Sergius, Bacchus, Marcellus and Apuleius Martyrs.
- 8: St. Bridget Widow, Double.
- 9: St. John Leonard Confessor, Double, Com. of Ss. Denis Bishop, Rusticus Priest, and Eleutherius Martyrs.
- 10: St. Francis Borgia Confessor, Semidouble.
- 11: The Maternity of the Blessed Virgin Mary, Double of the II Class.
- 12: Feria
- 13: St. Edward King, Confessor, Semidouble.
- 14: St. Callistus I Pope and Martyr, Double.
- 15: St. Teresa Virgin, Double.
- 16: St. Hedwig Widow, Semidouble.
- 17: St. Margaret Mary Alacoque Virgin, Double.
- 18: St. Luke Evangelist, Double of the II Class.
- 19: St. Peter of Alcantara Confessor, Double.
- 20: St. John Cantius Confessor, Double.
- 21: St. Hilarion Abbot, Simple, Com. of St. Ursula and Companions Virgins and Martyrs.
- 22: Feria
- 23: Feria
- 24: St. Raphael Archangel, Greater Double.
- 25: Ss. Chrysanthus and Daria Martyrs, Simple.
- 26: St. Evaristus Pope and Martyr, Simple.
- 27: Vigil.
- 28: Ss. Simon and Jude Apostles, Double of the II Class.
- 29: Feria
- 30: Feria
- 31: Vigil.

Last Sunday in October: The Feast of our Lord Jesus Christ the King, Double of the I Class, Com. of the Sunday.

== November ==
- 1: All Saints, Double of the I Class with a common Octave.
- 2 or, if 2 November is a Sunday, 3 November: Commemoration of all the Faithful Departed, Double
- 3: Of the III day within the Octave of All Saints, Semidouble.
- 4: St. Charles Bishop and Confessor, Double, Com. of the Octave of All Saints and Ss. Vitalis and Agricola Martyrs.
- 5: Of the V day within the Octave of All Saints, Semidouble.
- 6: Of the VI day within the Octave of All Saints, Semidouble.
- 7: Of the VII day within the Octave of All Saints, Semidouble.
- 8: Octave of All Saints, Greater Double, Com. of the Holy Four Crowned Martyrs.
- 9: Dedication of the Archbasilica of the most Holy Saviour, Double of the II Class, Com. of St. Theodore Martyr.
- 10: St. Andrew Avellino Confessor, Double, Com. of Ss. Tryphon, Respicius, and Nympha Martyrs.
- 11: St. Martin Bishop and Confessor, Double, Com. of St. Mennas Martyr.
- 12: St. Martin I Pope and Martyr, Semidouble.
- 13: St. Didacus Confessor, Semidouble.
- 14: St. Josaphat Bishop and Martyr, Double.
- 15: St. Albert the Great Bishop, Confessor, and Doctor of the Church, Double.
- 16: St. Gertrude Virgin, Double.
- 17: St. Gregory Thaumaturgus Bishop and Confessor, Semidouble.
- 18: Dedication of the Basilicas of Ss. Peter and Paul, Greater Double
- 19: St. Elisabeth Widow, Double, Com. of St. Pontianus Pope and Martyr.
- 20: St. Felix of Valois Confessor, Double.
- 21: Presentation of the Blessed Virgin Mary, Greater Double
- 22: St. Cecilia Virgin and Martyr, Double.
- 23: St. Clement I Pope and Martyr, Double, Com. of St. Felicitas Martyr.
- 24: St. John of the Cross Confessor and Doctor of the Church, Double, Com. St. Chrysogonus Martyr.
- 25: St. Catherine Virgin and Martyr, Double.
- 26: St. Sylvester Abbot, Double, Com. of St. Peter of Alexandria Bishop and Martyr.
- 27: Feria
- 28: Feria
- 29: Vigil. Commemoration of St. Saturninus.
- 30: St. Andrew Apostle, Double of the II Class.

== December ==
- 1: Feria
- 2: St. Bibiana Virgin and Martyr, Semidouble.
- 3: St. Francis Xavier Confessor, Greater Double.
- 4: St. Peter Chrysologus Bishop, Confessor, and Doctor of the Church, Double, Com. of St. Barbara Virgin and Martyr.
- 5: Com. of St. Sabbas Abbot.
- 6: St. Nicholas Bishop and Confessor, Double.
- 7: St. Ambrose Bishop, Confessor, and Doctor of the Church, Double, Com. of the Vigil.
- 8: The Immaculate Conception of the Blessed Virgin Mary, Double of the I Class with a common Octave.
- 9: Of the II day within the Octave of the Immaculate Conception, Semidouble.
- 10: Of the III day within the Octave of the Immaculate Conception, Semidouble, Com. of St. Melchiades Pope and Martyr.
- 11: St. Damasus I Pope and Confessor, Semidouble, Com. of the Octave of the Immaculate Conception.
- 12: Of the V day within the Octave of the Immaculate Conception, Semidouble.
- 13: St. Lucy Virgin and Martyr, Double, Com. of the Octave of the Immaculate Conception.
- 14: Of the VII day within the Octave of the Immaculate Conception, Semidouble.
- 15: Octave of the Immaculate Conception, Greater Double.
- 16: St. Eusebius Bishop and Martyr, Semidouble.
- 17: Feria
- 18: Feria
- 19: Feria
- 20: Vigil.
- 21: St. Thomas Apostle, Double of the II Class.
- 22: Feria
- 23: Feria
- 24: Vigil.
- 25: Nativity of our Lord Jesus Christ, Double of the I Class with a privileged Octave of the III rank.
- 26: St. Stephen Protomartyr, Double of the II class with a simple Octave, Com. of the Octave of the Nativity.
- 27: St. John Apostle and Evangelist, Double of the II class with a simple Octave, Com. of the Octave of the Nativity.
- 28: The Holy Innocents, Double of the II class with a simple Octave, Com. of the Octave of the Nativity.
- 29: St. Thomas Bishop and Martyr, Double, Com. of the Octave of the Nativity.
- 30: Of the VI day within the Octave of the Nativity, Semidouble.
- 31: St. Sylvester I Pope and Confessor, Double, Com. of the Octave of the Nativity.

Although not listed on the general Calendar, a commemoration of St. Anastasia Martyr is made at the second Mass on Christmas Day.

== Moveable feasts ==
The moveable feasts are those connected with the Easter cycle, and Easter is the date relative to which their position is ultimately determined. The date of Easter is determined relative to the lunar calendar as used by the Hebrews. The rule has since the Middle Ages been phrased as "Easter is observed on the Sunday after the first full moon on or after the day of the vernal equinox." However, this does not reflect the actual ecclesiastical rules precisely. One reason for this is that the full moon involved (called the Paschal full moon) is not an astronomical full moon, but an ecclesiastical moon. Another difference is that the astronomical vernal equinox is a natural astronomical phenomenon, which can fall on 20 or 21 March, while the ecclesiastical vernal equinox is a fixed March 21 (on the Gregorian calendar). Easter is determined from tables which determine Easter based on the ecclesiastical rules described above, which do not always coincide with the astronomical full moon. The moveable feasts are given below:

Septuagesima Sunday (9th Sunday before Easter)
Sexagesima Sunday (8th Sunday before Easter)
Quinquagesima Sunday (7th Sunday before Easter)
Ash Wednesday (Wednesday after Quinquagesima Sunday)
Passion Sunday (Sunday 2 weeks before Easter)
Feast of the Seven Sorrows of the Virgin Mary (Friday after 2nd Sunday before Easter)
Palm Sunday (Sunday before Easter)
Holy Thursday (Thursday before Easter)
Good Friday (Friday before Easter)
Holy Saturday (Saturday before Easter)
Easter Sunday, the Solemnity of Solemnities, the Resurrection of Our Lord Jesus Christ
Low Sunday (Sunday after Easter)
The Solemnity of St. Joseph, spouse of the Virgin Mary, confessor, and patron of the Universal Church (Wednesday after the 2nd Sunday after Easter)
The Octave of St. Joseph, spouse of the Virgin Mary, confessor and patron of the Universal Church (Wednesday after the 3rd Sunday after Easter)
The Lesser Litanies at St. Mary Major (Monday after the 5th Sunday after Easter)
The Lesser Litanies at St. John Lateran (Tuesday after the 5th Sunday after Easter)
The Vigil of the Ascension of our Lord Jesus Christ and the Lesser Litanies at St. Peter's (Wednesday after the 5th Sunday after Easter)
The Ascension (Thursday after the 5th Sunday after Easter)
The Octave of the Ascension (Thursday after the 6th Sunday after Easter)
The Vigil of Pentecost (Saturday after the 6th Sunday after Easter)
Pentecost (7th Sunday after Easter)
Holy Trinity and the Octave of Pentecost (8th Sunday after Easter)
Corpus Christi (Thursday after the 8th Sunday after Easter)
Octave of Corpus Christi (Thursday after the 9th Sunday after Easter)
Sacred Heart of Jesus (Friday after the 9th Sunday after Easter)
Octave of the Sacred Heart of Jesus (Friday after the 10th Sunday after Easter)

The 1954 calendar assigned special celebrations also to the days within these Octaves, as to the days within the Octaves of fixed feasts.

== Feasts celebrated in some places (pro Aliquibus Locis) ==
The pre-1962 Roman Missal also listed a number of celebrations in the section headed "Mass for Some Places". These celebrations were:

The Holy House of Loreto (10 December)
The Expectation of the Blessed Virgin Mary (18 December)
The Betrothal of the Virgin Mary with Saint Joseph (23 January)
Saint Ildephonsus (23 January)
The Flight into Egypt (17 February)
Saint Margaret of Cortona (26 February)
The Prayer of Christ (Tuesday after Septuagesima)
Commemoration of the Passion of Christ (Tuesday after Sexagesima)
The Sacred Crown of Thorns (Friday after Ash Wednesday)
The Sacred Lance and Nails (Friday after the First Sunday in Lent)
The Holy Shroud (Friday after the Second Sunday in Lent)
The Five Holy Wounds (Friday after the Third Sunday in Lent)
The Precious Blood (Friday after the Fourth Sunday in Lent)
Saint Catherine of Genoa (22 March)
Saint Benedict Joseph Labre (16 April)
Our Lady of Good Counsel (26 April)
Saint Isidore the Farmer (15 May)
Saint John Nepomucene (16 May)
Saint Rita of Cascia (22 May)
Saint John Baptist de Rossi (23 May)
Our Lady Help of Christians (24 May)
Saint Ferdinand III (30 May)
Saint Joan of Arc (30 May)
Our Lady Queen of All Saints and Mother of Fair Love (31 May)
Our Lady Mediatrix of All Graces (31 May)
Our Lady Queen of the Apostles (Saturday after the Ascension)
The Immaculate Heart of Mary (Saturday after the octave of Corpus Christi)
The Eucharistic Heart of Jesus (Thursday after the octave of Corpus Christi)
Our Lady Mother of Grace (9 June)
Saint John Francis Regis (16 June)
Our Lady of Prompt Succor (27 June)
All Holy Popes (3 July)
Saint Lawrence of Brindisi (7 July)
Saint Veronica Giuliani (9 July)
Humility of the Blessed Virgin Mary (17 July)
Our Lady Mother of Mercy (Saturday after the 4th Sunday of July)
Saint Emygdius (9 August)
Saint Philomena (11 August)
Our Lady Refuge of Sinners (13 August)
Saint John Berchmans (13 August)
Saint Roch (16 August)
Empress Helena (18 August)
Our Lady of Consolation (Saturday after the Feast of St. Augustine)
Our Lady Help of the Sick (Saturday after the last Sunday in August)
Saint Rose of Viterbo (4 September)
Saint Peter Claver (9 September)
Saint Gregory the Illuminator (1 October)
Purity of the Blessed Virgin Mary (16 October)
Feast of the Holy Redeemer (23 October)
The Sacred Relics (5 November)
Saint Stanislaus Kostka (13 November)
Our Lady Mother of Divine Providence (Saturday after the 3rd Sunday in November)
St. Leonard of Port Maurice (26 November)
Our Lady of the Miraculous Medal (27 November)

== See also ==
- List of saints
- Moveable feast
- Name days in the Czech Republic
- Name days in Sweden
- Namesdays
- General Roman Calendar
- Tridentine calendar
- General Roman Calendar of Pope Pius XII
- General Roman Calendar of 1960
- General Roman Calendar of 1969
