= General Roman Calendar of Pope Pius XII =

Pope Pius XII made the decree Cum nostra hac ætate 23 March 1955, enacting several changes to the General Roman Calendar, which had been most recently updated in 1954. That version remained in force until 1960, when Pope John XXIII decreed a new revision, called the General Roman Calendar of 1960.

The General Calendar of Pope Pius XII is not authorized for liturgical use by traditional groups in communion with the Holy See. Most sedevacantists prefer to use the General Roman Calendar of 1954, as well as Old Roman Catholics, as their members consider it to be the last calendar before by the revisions that began in 1955. However, a few sedevacantists do observe the revisions beginning in 1955, while excluding those of the John XXIII, such as the Congregation of Mary Immaculate Queen.

== Changes to the Calendar ==
=== Rank of feasts ===
The grade and rite of "Semi-Double" was suppressed, and the liturgical days formerly celebrated as that rite were to be celebrated in the simple rite except the Vigil of Pentecost which was raised to the double rite.

=== Sundays ===
The Sundays of Advent and Lent and those that follow up to Low Sunday, and also Pentecost Sunday, were to be celebrated as doubles of the first class, outranking all feasts; but when feasts of the first class occurred on the second, third or fourth Sunday of Advent, Masses of the feast were permitted except the conventual Mass. Sundays previously celebrated in the Semi-Double rite were raised to the Double rite. An impeded Sunday Office and Mass was to be neither anticipated nor resumed. A feast or title or any mystery of Jesus falling on a Sunday per annum was thenceforth to take the place of the Sunday, with the latter merely commemorated.

=== Vigils ===
The Vigil of the Nativity of the Lord and the vigil of Pentecost were privileged vigils. The Vigils of the Ascension of Our Lord, the Assumption of the Blessed Virgin Mary, Saint John the Baptist, Saints Peter and Paul and Saint Lawrence were to be common vigils and, if they occurred on a Sunday, were not to be anticipated, but simply omitted. All other vigils, including those marked in particular calendars, were suppressed.

=== Octaves ===
Only the Octaves of Easter, Christmas and Pentecost were to be celebrated; all others occurring either in the universal or in particular calendars were suppressed. The days within the Easter and Pentecost octaves were raised to the Double rite, had precedence over all feasts, and did not admit commemorations. But the days in the Octave of Christmas, although of the Double rite, continued to be celebrated as before.

From 2 to 5 January, unless some feast occurred, the Office was to be of the current feria in the simple rite. The Mass was to be the same as that of 1 January but without the Credo and the special "Communicantes".

With the suppression of the Octave of Epiphany, the days from 7 to 12 January became feriæ per annum (in the Simple rite); up to the Sunday following Epiphany, the Mass was to be the same as that of the Epiphany, but without the Credo and without the special "Communicantes"; after the Sunday, the mass was to be that of the Sunday (which on that Sunday itself remained continually impeded by the Feast of the Holy Family). On 13 January the Commemoration of the Baptism of our Lord was to be celebrated in the major double rite, using for the Office and the Mass those previously said on the Octave of the Epiphany. But if 13 January occurred on Sunday, the Office and Mass were to be those of the "Feast of the Holy Family" without any commemoration of the Baptism of Our Lord.

The days from the Ascension of Our Lord to the Vigil of Pentecost exclusive became feriæ of Eastertide (in the Simple rite); the Mass was to be that of the Feast of the Ascension, but without the Credo and the special Communicantes (even on the Friday before Pentecost, where hitherto the Mass of the Sunday had to be taken). The days of the suppressed Octaves of Corpus Christi and the Most Sacred Heart of Jesus became feriæ per annum.

=== Feasts of the Saints ===
Saints' feasts previously celebrated in the Semi-Double rite were to be treated as Simple feasts, and those previously celebrated in the Simple rite were reduced to a commemoration. If any feast not of the first or second class occurred on the ferias of Lent and Passiontide, from Ash Wednesday to the Saturday before Palm Sunday, the Office (if recited privately) and the Mass could be either of the feria or of the feast.

=== Changes related to St. Joseph and others ===
By a separate decree of the same year 1955, Pope Pius XII instituted the feast of "Saint Joseph the Worker" on 1 May (moving the feast of "Saints Philip and James Apostles" from 1 May, where it had been since the sixth century, to 11 May, and suppressing the "Solemnity of Saint Joseph, Spouse of the Blessed Virgin Mary" that, since Pope Pius IX's decree of 10 September 1847, had been celebrated on the second Wednesday after the Octave of Easter).

== January ==
- 1: Circumcision of the Lord and Octave of the Nativity, Double of the II Class.
- 2: Feria
- 3: Feria
- 4: Feria
- 5: Com. of St. Telesphorus Pope and Martyr.
- 6: Epiphany of the Lord, Double of the I Class.
- 7: Feria
- 8: Feria
- 9: Feria
- 10: Feria
- 11: Com. of St. Hyginus Pope and Martyr.
- 12: Feria
- 13: Baptism of our Lord Jesus Christ, Greater Double.
- 14: St. Hilary Bishop, Confessor, and Doctor of the Church, Double, Com. of St. Felix Priest and Martyr.
- 15: St. Paul first hermit, Confessor, Double, Com. of St. Maurus.
- 16: St. Marcellus I Pope and Martyr, Simple.
- 17: St. Anthony Abbot, Double.
- 18: Chair of St. Peter Apostle at Rome, Greater Double, Com. of St. Paul Apostle, and of St. Prisca Virgin and Martyr.
- 19: Com. of Ss. Marius, Martha, Audifax, and Abachum Martyrs, Com. of St. Canute, Martyr.
- 20: Ss. Fabian Pope and Sebastian Martyrs, Double.
- 21: St. Agnes, Roman Virgin and Martyr, Double
- 22: Ss. Vincent and Anastasius Martyrs, Simple.
- 23: St. Raymund of Peñafort Confessor, Simple, Com. of St. Emerentiana Virgin and Martyr.
- 24: St. Timothy Bishop and Martyr, Double.
- 25: Conversion of St. Paul Apostle, Greater Double, Com. of St. Peter.
- 26: St. Polycarp Bishop and Martyr, Double.
- 27: St. John Chrysostom Bishop, Confessor, and Doctor of the Church, Double.
- 28: St. Peter Nolasco Confessor, Double, Com. of St. Agnes Virgin and Martyr second.
- 29: St. Francis de Sales Bishop, Confessor, and Doctor of the Church, Double.
- 30: St. Martina Virgin and Martyr, Simple.
- 31: St. John Bosco Confessor, Double.

Sunday between the Circumcision and Epiphany [or January 2, when no such Sunday occurs]: The most holy Name of Jesus, Double of the II Class.
Sunday after Epiphany: The Most Holy Family of Jesus, Mary, Joseph, Greater Double.

== February ==
- 1: St. Ignatius Bishop and Martyr, Double.
- 2: Purification of the Blessed Virgin Mary, Double of the II Class.
- 3: Com. of St. Blase Bishop and Martyr.
- 4: St. Andrew Corsini Bishop and Confessor, Double.
- 5: St. Agatha Virgin Martyr, Double.
- 6: St. Titus Bishop and Confessor, Double, Com. of St. Dorothy Virgin Martyr.
- 7: St. Romuald Abbot, Double.
- 8: St. John of Matha Confessor, Double.
- 9: St. Cyril Bishop of Alexandria, Confessor, and Doctor of the Church, Double, Com. of St. Apollonia Virgin Martyr.
- 10: St. Scholastica Virgin, Double.
- 11: Apparition of the Blessed Virgin Mary Immaculate, Greater Double.
- 12: The Seven Holy Founders of the Order of Servants of the Blessed Virgin Mary Confessors, Double.
- 13: Feria
- 14: Com. of St. Valentine Priest and Martyr.
- 15: Com. of Ss. Faustinus and Jovita Martyrs.
- 16: Feria
- 17: Feria
- 18: Com. of St. Simeon Bishop and Martyr.
- 19: Feria
- 20: Feria
- 21: Feria
- 22: Chair of St. Peter at Antioch, Greater Double, Com. of St. Paul.
- 23: St. Peter Damian Confessor, Double.
- 24: St. Matthias Apostle, Double of the II Class.
- 25: Feria
- 26: Feria
- 27: St. Gabriel of Our Lady of Sorrows, Double
- 28: Feria

In leap year the month of February is of 29 days, and the Feast of St. Matthias is celebrated on the 25th day and the Feast of St. Gabriel of Our Lady of Sorrows on the 28th day of February, and twice is said Sexto Kalendas, that is on the 24th day and 25th day; and the dominical letter, which was taken up in the month of January, is changed to the preceding; that, if in January, the dominical letter was A, it is changed to the preceding, which is g, etc.; and the letter f is kept twice, on the 24th and 25th.

== March ==
- 1: Feria
- 2: Feria
- 3: Feria
- 4: St. Casimir Confessor, Simple, Com. of St. Lucius I Pope and Martyr.
- 5: Feria
- 6: Ss. Perpetua and Felicity Martyrs, Double.
- 7: St. Thomas Aquinas Confessor and Doctor of the Church, Double.
- 8: St. John of God Confessor, Double.
- 9: St. Frances of Rome Widow, Double.
- 10: The Forty Holy Martyrs, Simple.
- 11: Feria
- 12: St. Gregory I Pope, Confessor, and Doctor of the Church, Double.
- 13: Feria
- 14: Feria
- 15: Feria
- 16: Feria
- 17: St. Patrick Bishop and Confessor, Double.
- 18: St. Cyril Bishop of Jerusalem, Confessor, and Doctor of the Church, Double.
- 19: St. Joseph, Spouse of the Blessed Virgin Mary, Confessor, and Patron of the Universal Church, Double of the I Class.
- 20: Feria
- 21: St. Benedict Abbot, Greater Double.
- 22: Feria
- 23: Feria
- 24: St. Gabriel the Archangel, Greater Double.
- 25: Annunciation of the Blessed Virgin Mary, Double of the I Class.
- 26: Feria
- 27: St. John Damascene Confessor and Doctor of the Church, Double.
- 28: St. John Capistran Confessor, Simple.
- 29: Feria
- 30: Feria
- 31: Feria

Friday after Passion Sunday: Seven Sorrows of the Blessed Virgin Mary, Greater Double, Com. of the Feria.

== April ==
- 1: Feria
- 2: St. Francis of Paula Confessor, Double.
- 3: Feria
- 4: St. Isidore Bishop, Confessor, and Doctor of the Church, Double.
- 5: St. Vincent Ferrer Confessor, Double.
- 6: Feria
- 7: Feria
- 8: Feria
- 9: Feria
- 10: Feria
- 11: St. Leo I Pope, Confessor, and Doctor of the Church, Double.
- 12: Feria
- 13: St. Hermenegild Martyr, Simple.
- 14: St. Justin Martyr, Double, Com. of Saints Tiburtius, Valerian and Maximus, Martyrs.
- 15: Feria
- 16: Feria
- 17: Com. of St. Anicetus Pope and Martyr.
- 18: Feria
- 19: Feria
- 20: Feria
- 21: St. Anselm Bishop, Confessor, and Doctor of the Church, Double.
- 22: Ss. Soter and Cajus Popes and Martyrs, Simple.
- 23: St. George Martyr, Simple.
- 24: St. Fidelis of Sigmaringen Martyr, Double.
- 25: St. Mark Evangelist, Double of the II Class.
- 26: Ss. Cletus and Marcellinus Popes and Martyrs, Simple.
- 27: St. Peter Canisius Confessor and Doctor of the Church, Double.
- 28: St. Paul of the Cross Confessor, Double, Com. of St. Vitalis Martyr.
- 29: St. Peter Martyr, Double.
- 30: St. Catherine of Siena Virgin, Double.

== May ==
- 1: St. Joseph the Worker, Spouse of the Blessed Virgin Mary, Confessor, Double of the I Class.
- 2: St. Athanasius, Bishop, Confessor, and Doctor of the Church, Double.
- 3: Invention of the Holy Cross, Double of the II Class, Com. of Ss. Alexander, Pope, Eventius and Theodulus Martyrs, and Juvenal, Bishop and Confessor.
- 4: St. Monica Widow, Double.
- 5: St. Pius V Pope and Confessor, Double.
- 6: St. John Apostle before the Latin Gate, Greater Double.
- 7: St. Stanislaus Bishop and Martyr, Double.
- 8: Apparition of St. Michael, Greater Double
- 9: St. Gregory Nazianzen Bishop, Confessor, and Doctor of the Church, Double.
- 10: St. Antoninus Bishop and Confessor, Double, Com. of Ss. Gordian and Epimachus Martyrs.
- 11: Ss. Philip and James Apostles, Double of the II Class.
- 12: Ss. Nereus, Achilleus, Domitilla Virgin, and Pancras Martyrs, Simple.
- 13: St. Robert Bellarmine Bishop, Confessor, and Doctor of the Church, Double.
- 14: Com. of St. Boniface Martyr.
- 15: St. John Baptist de la Salle Confessor, Double.
- 16: St. Ubald Bishop and Confessor, Simple.
- 17: St. Paschal Baylon Confessor, Double.
- 18: St. Venantius Martyr, Double.
- 19: St. Peter Celestine Pope and Confessor, Double, Com. of St. Pudentiana Virgin.
- 20: St. Bernardine of Siena Confessor, Simple.
- 21: Feria
- 22: Feria
- 23: Feria
- 24: Feria
- 25: St. Gregory VII Pope and Confessor, Double, Com. of St. Urban I Pope and Martyr, Double.
- 26: St. Philip Neri Confessor, Double, Com. of St. Eleutherius Pope and Martyr.
- 27: St. Bede the Venerable Confessor and Doctor of the Church, Com. of St. John I Pope and Martyr, Double.
- 28: St. Augustine Bishop and Confessor, Double.
- 29: St. Mary Magdalen de Pazzi Virgin, Simple.
- 30: Com. of St. Felix I Pope and Martyr.
- 31: Blessed Virgin Mary, Queen Double of the II Class, Com. of St. Petronilla Virgin.

== June ==
- 1: St. Angela Merici Virgin, Double.
- 2: Com. of Ss. Marcellinus, Peter, and Erasmus Bishop, Martyrs.
- 3: Feria
- 4: St. Francis Caracciolo Confessor, Double.
- 5: St. Boniface Bishop and Martyr, Double.
- 6: St. Norbert Bishop and Confessor, Double.
- 7: Feria
- 8: Feria
- 9: Com. of Ss. Primus and Felician Martyrs.
- 10: St. Margaret Queen, Widow, Simple.
- 11: St. Barnabas Apostle, Greater Double.
- 12: St. John of San Facundo Confessor, Double, Com. of Ss. Basilides, Cyrinus, Nabor and Nazarius Martyrs.
- 13: St. Anthony of Padua Confessor and Doctor of the Church, Double.
- 14: St. Basil the Great Bishop, Confessor, and Doctor of the Church, Double.
- 15: Com. of Ss. Vitus, Modestus, and Crescentia Martyrs.
- 16: Feria
- 17: Feria
- 18: St. Ephraem Syrus Deacon, Confessor, and Doctor of the Church, Double, Com. of Ss. Mark and Marcellianus Martyrs.
- 19: St. Juliana Falconieri Virgin, Double, Com. of Ss. Gervase and Protase Martyrs.
- 20: Com. of St. Silverius Pope and Martyr.
- 21: St. Aloysius Gonzaga Confessor, Double.
- 22: St. Paulinus Bishop and Confessor, Double
- 23: Vigil.
- 24: The Nativity of St. John the Baptist, Double of the I Class.
- 25: St. William Abbot, Double.
- 26: Ss. John and Paul Martyrs, Double.
- 27: Feria
- 28: St. Irenaeus Bishop and Martyr, Double, Com. of the Vigil.
- 29: Ss. Peter and Paul Apostles, Double of the I Class.
- 30: Commemoration of St. Paul Apostle, Greater Double, Com. of St. Peter Apostle.

== July ==
- 1: The Most Precious Blood of our Lord Jesus Christ, Double of the I Class.
- 2: Visitation of the Blessed Virgin Mary, Double of the II Class, Com. of Ss. Processus and Martinian Martyrs.
- 3: St. Leo II Pope and Confessor, Simple.
- 4: Feria
- 5: St. Anthony Mary Zaccaria Confessor, Double.
- 6: Feria
- 7: Ss. Cyril and Methodius Bishops and Confessors, Double.
- 8: St. Elizabeth Queen, Widow, Simple.
- 9: Feria
- 10: The Seven Holy Brothers Martyrs, Simple, and Ss. Rufina and Secunda Virgins and Martyrs.
- 11: Com. of St. Pius I Pope and Martyr.
- 12: St. John Gualbert Abbot, Double, Com. of Ss. Nabor and Felix Martyrs.
- 13: St. Anacletus Pope and Martyr, Simple.
- 14: St. Bonaventure Bishop, Confessor, and Doctor of the Church, Double.
- 15: St. Henry II Emperor, Confessor, Simple.
- 16: Commemoration of the Blessed Virgin Mary of Mt. Carmel, Greater Double.
- 17: St. Alexius Confessor, Simple.
- 18: St. Camillus de Lellis Confessor, Double, Com. of St. Symphorosa and her seven Sons Martyrs.
- 19: St. Vincent de Paul Confessor, Double.
- 20: St. Jerome Emiliani Confessor, Double, Com. of St. Margaret Virgin Martyr.
- 21: Com. of St. Praxedes Virgin.
- 22: St. Mary Magdalene Penitent, Double.
- 23: St. Apollinaris Martyr, Double, Com. of St. Liborius Bishop and Confessor.
- 24: Com. of St. Christina Virgin and Martyr.
- 25: St. James Apostle, Double of the II Class, Com. of St. Christopher Martyr.
- 26: St. Anne Mother of the Blessed Virgin Mary, Double of the II Class.
- 27: Com. of St. Pantaleon Martyr.
- 28: Ss. Nazarius and Celsus Martyrs, Victor I Pope and Martyr, and St. Innocent I Pope and Confessor, Simple.
- 29: St. Martha Virgin, Simple, Com. of Ss. Felix II Pope, Simplicius, Faustinus, and Beatrice Martyrs.
- 30: Com. of Ss. Abdon and Sennen Martyrs.
- 31: St. Ignatius Confessor, Greater Double.

== August ==
- 1: St. Peter in Chains, Greater Double, Com. of St. Paul and the Holy Machabees Martyrs.
- 2: St. Alphonsus Mary of Liguori Bishop, Confessor, and Doctor of the Church, Double, Com. of St. Stephen I Pope and Martyr.
- 3: Invention of St. Stephen Protomartyr, Simple.
- 4: St. Dominic Confessor, Greater Double.
- 5: Dedication of Our Lady of the Snows, Greater Double.
- 6: Transfiguration of our Lord Jesus Christ, Double of the II Class, Com. of Ss. Sixtus II Pope, Felicissimus and Agapitus Martyrs.
- 7: St. Cajetan Confessor, Double, Com. of St. Donatus Bishop and Martyr.
- 8: Ss. Cyriacus, Largus and Smaragdus Martyrs, Simple.
- 9: St. John Vianney Confessor and Priest, Double, Com. of the Vigil and St. Romanus Martyr.
- 10: St. Laurence Martyr, Double of the II Class.
- 11: Com. of Ss. Tiburtius and Susanna Virgin, Martyrs.
- 12: St. Clare Virgin, Double.
- 13: Com. of Ss. Hippolytus and Cassian Martyrs.
- 14: Vigil. Com. of St. Eusebius Confessor.
- 15: Assumption of the Blessed Virgin Mary, Double of the I Class.
- 16: St. Joachim Father of the Blessed Virgin Mary, Confessor, Double of the II Class.
- 17: St. Hyacinth Confessor, Double.
- 18: Com. of St. Agapitus Martyr.
- 19: St. John Eudes Confessor, Double.
- 20: St. Bernard Abbot, Confessor, and Doctor of the Church, Double.
- 21: St. Jane Frances de Chantal Widow, Double.
- 22: Immaculate Heart of the Blessed Virgin Mary, Double of the II Class, Com. of Ss. Timothy, Hippolytus Bishop, and Symphorianus Martyrs.
- 23: St. Philip Benizi Confessor, Double.
- 24: St. Bartholomew Apostle, Double of the II Class.
- 25: St. Louis King, Confessor, Simple.
- 26: Com. of St. Zephyrinus Pope Martyr.
- 27: St. Joseph Calasanctius Confessor, Double.
- 28: St. Augustine Bishop, Confessor, and Doctor of the Church, Double, Com. of St. Hermes Martyr.
- 29: Beheading of St. John the Baptist, Greater Double, Com. of St. Sabina Martyr.
- 30: St. Rose of St. Mary Virgin of Lima, Double, Com. of Ss. Felix and Adauctus Martyrs.
- 31: St. Raymond Nonnatus Confessor, Double.

== September ==
- 1: Com. of St. Giles Abbot, Com. of the Holy Twelve Brothers Martyrs.
- 2: St. Stephen King, Confessor, Simple.
- 3: St. Pius X Pope and Confessor, Double.
- 4: Feria
- 5: St. Laurence Justinian Bishop and Confessor, Simple.
- 6: Feria
- 7: Feria
- 8: Nativity of the Blessed Virgin Mary, Double of the II Class, Com. of St. Adrian Martyr.
- 9: Com. of St. Gorgonius Martyr.
- 10: St. Nicholas of Tolentino Confessor, Double.
- 11: Com. of Ss. Protus and Hyacinth Martyrs.
- 12: The Most Holy Name of Mary, Greater Double.
- 13: Feria
- 14: Exaltation of the Holy Cross, Greater Double.
- 15: Seven Sorrows of the Blessed Virgin Mary, Double of the II Class, Com. of St. Nicomedes Martyr.
- 16: St. Cornelius Pope and St. Cyprian Bishop, Martyrs, Simple, Com. of Ss. Euphemia Virgin, Lucy and Geminian Martyrs.
- 17: Impression of the sacred Stigmata of St. Francis Confessor, Double.
- 18: St. Joseph of Cupertino Confessor, Double.
- 19: St. Januarius Bishop and Companions Martyrs, Double.
- 20: St. Eustace and Companions Martyrs, Double.
- 21: St. Matthew Apostle and Evangelist, Double of the II Class.
- 22: St. Thomas of Villanova Bishop and Confessor, Double, Com. of Ss. Maurice and Companions Martyrs.
- 23: St. Linus Pope and Martyr, Simple, Com. of St. Thecla Virgin and Martyr.
- 24: Our Lady of Ransom, Greater Double.
- 25: Feria
- 26: Com. of Ss. Cyprian and Justina Virgin, Martyrs.
- 27: Ss. Cosmas and Damian Martyrs, Simple.
- 28: St. Wenceslaus Duke, Martyr, Simple.
- 29: Dedication of St. Michael Archangel, Double of the I Class.
- 30: St. Jerome Priest, Confessor, and Doctor of the Church, Double.

== October ==
- 1: Com. of St. Remigius Bishop and Confessor.
- 2: The Holy Guardian Angels, Greater Double.
- 3: St. Teresa of the Child Jesus Virgin, Double.
- 4: St. Francis of Assisi Confessor, Greater Double.
- 5: Com. of St. Placid and companions Martyrs.
- 6: St. Bruno Confessor, Double.
- 7: The most Holy Rosary of the Blessed Virgin Mary, Double of the II Class, Com. of St. Mark Pope and Confessor, and Ss. Sergius, Bacchus, Marcellus and Apuleius Martyrs.
- 8: St. Bridget Widow, Double.
- 9: St. John Leonard Confessor, Double, Com. of Ss. Denis Bishop, Rusticus Priest, and Eleutherius Martyrs.
- 10: St. Francis Borgia Confessor, Simple.
- 11: The Maternity of the Blessed Virgin Mary, Double of the II Class.
- 12: Feria
- 13: St. Edward King, Confessor, Simple.
- 14: St. Callistus I Pope and Martyr, Double.
- 15: St. Teresa Virgin, Double.
- 16: St. Hedwig Widow, Simple.
- 17: St. Margaret Mary Alacoque Virgin, Double.
- 18: St. Luke Evangelist, Double of the II Class.
- 19: St. Peter of Alcantara Confessor, Double.
- 20: St. John Cantius Confessor, Double.
- 21: Com. of St. Hilarion Abbot, Com. of St. Ursula and Companions Virgins and Martyrs.
- 22: Feria
- 23: Feria
- 24: St. Raphael Archangel, Greater Double.
- 25: Com. of Ss. Chrysanthus and Daria Martyrs.
- 26: Com. of St. Evaristus Pope and Martyr.
- 27: Feria
- 28: Ss. Simon and Jude Apostles, Double of the II Class.
- 29: Feria
- 30: Feria
- 31: Feria

Last Sunday in October: The Feast of our Lord Jesus Christ the King, Double of the I Class, Com. of the Sunday.

== November ==
- 1: All Saints, Double of the I Class.
- 2 or, if 2 November is a Sunday, 3 November: Commemoration of all the Faithful Departed, Double
- 3: Feria
- 4: St. Charles Bishop and Confessor, Double, Com. of Ss. Vitalis and Agricola Martyrs.
- 5: Feria
- 6: Feria
- 7: Feria
- 8: Com. of the Holy Four Crowned Martyrs.
- 9: Dedication of the Archbasilica of the most Holy Saviour, Double of the II Class, Com. of St. Theodore Martyr.
- 10: St. Andrew Avellino Confessor, Double, Com. of Ss. Tryphon, Respicius, and Nympha Martyrs.
- 11: St. Martin Bishop and Confessor, Double, Com. of St. Mennas Martyr.
- 12: St. Martin I Pope and Martyr, Simple.
- 13: St. Didacus Confessor, Simple.
- 14: St. Josaphat Bishop and Martyr, Double.
- 15: St. Albert the Great Bishop, Confessor, and Doctor of the Church, Double.
- 16: St. Gertrude Virgin, Double.
- 17: St. Gregory Thaumaturgus Bishop and Confessor, Simple.
- 18: Dedication of the Basilicas of Ss. Peter and Paul, Greater Double
- 19: St. Elisabeth Widow, Double, Com. of St. Pontianus Pope and Martyr.
- 20: St. Felix of Valois Confessor, Double.
- 21: Presentation of the Blessed Virgin Mary, Greater Double
- 22: St. Cecilia Virgin and Martyr, Double.
- 23: St. Clement I Pope and Martyr, Double, Com. of St. Felicitas Martyr.
- 24: St. John of the Cross Confessor and Doctor of the Church, Double, Com. St. Chrysogonus Martyr.
- 25: St. Catherine Virgin and Martyr, Double.
- 26: St. Sylvester Abbot, Double, Com. of St. Peter of Alexandria Bishop and Martyr.
- 27: Feria
- 28: Feria
- 29: Commemoration of St. Saturninus.
- 30: St. Andrew Apostle, Double of the II Class.

== December ==
- 1: Feria
- 2: St. Bibiana Virgin and Martyr, Simple.
- 3: St. Francis Xavier Confessor, Greater Double.
- 4: St. Peter Chrysologus Bishop, Confessor, and Doctor of the Church, Double, Com. of St. Barbara Virgin and Martyr.
- 5: Com. of St. Sabbas Abbot.
- 6: St. Nicholas Bishop and Confessor, Double.
- 7: St. Ambrose Bishop, Confessor, and Doctor of the Church, Double.
- 8: The Immaculate Conception of the Blessed Virgin Mary, Double of the I Class.
- 9: Feria
- 10: Com. of St. Melchiades Pope and Martyr.
- 11: St. Damasus I Pope and Confessor, Simple.
- 12: Feria
- 13: St. Lucy Virgin and Martyr, Double.
- 14: Feria
- 15: Feria
- 16: St. Eusebius Bishop and Martyr, Simple.
- 17: Feria
- 18: Feria
- 19: Feria
- 20: Feria
- 21: St. Thomas Apostle, Double of the II Class.
- 22: Feria
- 23: Feria
- 24: Vigil.
- 25: Nativity of our Lord Jesus Christ, Double of the I Class with a privileged Octave of the III rank.
- 26: St. Stephen Protomartyr, Double of the II class, Com. of the Octave of the Nativity.
- 27: St. John Apostle and Evangelist, Double of the II class, Com. of the Octave of the Nativity.
- 28: The Holy Innocents, Double of the II class, Com. of the Octave of the Nativity.
- 29: St. Thomas Bishop and Martyr, Double, Com. of the Octave of the Nativity.
- 30: Of the VI day within the Octave of the Nativity, Double.
- 31: St. Sylvester I Pope and Confessor, Double, Com. of the Octave of the Nativity.

Although not listed on the general Calendar, a commemoration of St. Anastasia Martyr is made at the second Mass on Christmas Day.

== Moveable feasts ==
The moveable feasts are those connected with the Easter cycle, and Easter is the date relative to which their position is ultimately determined. The date of Easter is determined relative to the lunar calendar as used by the Hebrews. The rule has since the Middle Ages been phrased as "Easter is observed on the Sunday after the first full moon on or after the day of the vernal equinox." However, this does not reflect the actual ecclesiastical rules precisely. One reason for this is that the full moon involved (called the Paschal full moon) is not an astronomical full moon, but an ecclesiastical moon. Another difference is that the astronomical vernal equinox is a natural astronomical phenomenon, which can fall on 20 or 21 March, while the ecclesiastical vernal equinox is a fixed March 21 (on the Gregorian calendar). Easter is determined from tables which determine Easter based on the ecclesiastical rules described above, which do not always coincide with the astronomical full moon. The moveable feasts are given below:

- Septuagesima Sunday (9th Sunday before Easter)
- Sexagesima Sunday (8th Sunday before Easter)
- Quinquagesima Sunday (7th Sunday before Easter)
- Ash Wednesday (Wednesday after Quinquagesima Sunday)
- Passion Sunday (Sunday 2 weeks before Easter)
- Feast of the Seven Sorrows of the Virgin Mary (Friday after 2nd Sunday before Easter)
- Palm Sunday (Sunday before Easter)
- Holy Thursday (Thursday before Easter)
- Good Friday (Friday before Easter)
- Holy Saturday (Saturday before Easter)
- Easter Sunday, the Solemnity of Solemnities, the Resurrection of Our Lord Jesus Christ
- Low Sunday (Sunday after Easter)
- The Lesser Litanies at St. Mary Major (Monday after the 5th Sunday after Easter)
- The Lesser Litanies at St. John Lateran (Tuesday after the 5th Sunday after Easter)
- The Vigil of the Ascension of our Lord Jesus Christ and the Lesser Litanies at St. Peter's (Wednesday after the 5th Sunday after Easter)
- The Ascension (Thursday after the 5th Sunday after Easter)
- The Vigil of Pentecost (Saturday after the 6th Sunday after Easter)
- Pentecost (7th Sunday after Easter)
- Holy Trinity and the Octave of Pentecost (8th Sunday after Easter)
- Corpus Christi (Thursday after the 8th Sunday after Easter)
- Sacred Heart of Jesus (Friday after the 9th Sunday after Easter)

The 1955 calendar assigned special celebrations also to the days within the Octaves of Easter and Pentecost, as to the days within the Octave of Christmas.

== Feasts celebrated in some places (pro Aliquibus Locis) ==
The 1955 Roman Missal also listed a number of celebrations in the section headed "Mass for Some Places". These celebrations were:

- The Holy House of Loreto (10 December)
- The Expectation of the Blessed Virgin Mary (18 December)
- The Betrothal of the Virgin Mary with Saint Joseph (23 January)
- Saint Ildephonsus (23 January)
- The Flight into Egypt (17 February)
- Saint Margaret of Cortona (26 February)
- The Prayer of Christ (Tuesday after Septuagesima)
- Commemoration of the Passion of Christ (Tuesday after Sexagesima)
- The Sacred Crown of Thorns (Friday after Ash Wednesday)
- The Sacred Lance and Nails (Friday after the First Sunday in Lent)
- The Holy Shroud (Friday after the Second Sunday in Lent)
- The Five Holy Wounds (Friday after the Third Sunday in Lent)
- The Precious Blood (Friday after the Fourth Sunday in Lent)
- Saint Catherine of Genoa (22 March)
- Saint Benedict Joseph Labre (16 April)
- Our Lady of Good Counsel (26 April)
- Saint Isidore the Farmer (15 May)
- Saint John Nepomucene (16 May)
- Saint Rita of Cascia (22 May)
- Saint John Baptist de Rossi (23 May)
- Our Lady Help of Christians (24 May)
- Saint Ferdinand III (30 May)
- Saint Joan of Arc (30 May)
- Our Lady Queen of All Saints and Mother of Fair Love (31 May)
- Our Lady Mediatrix of All Graces (31 May)
- Our Lady Queen of the Apostles (Saturday after the Ascension)
- The Immaculate Heart of Mary (Saturday after the 9th Sunday after Easter)
- The Eucharistic Heart of Jesus (Thursday after the 10th Sunday after Easter)
- Our Lady Mother of Grace (9 June)
- Saint John Francis Regis (16 June)
- Our Lady of Perpetual Help (27 June)
- All Holy Popes (3 July)
- Saint Lawrence of Brindisi (7 July)
- Saint Veronica Giuliani (9 July)
- Humility of the Blessed Virgin Mary (17 July)
- Our Lady Mother of Mercy (Saturday after the 4th Sunday of July)
- Saint Emygdius (9 August)
- Saint Philomena (11 August)
- Our Lady Refuge of Sinners (13 August)
- Saint John Berchmans (13 August)
- Saint Roch (16 August)
- Empress Helena (18 August)
- Our Lady of Consolation (Saturday after the Feast of St. Augustine)
- Our Lady Help of the Sick (Saturday after the last Sunday in August)
- Saint Rose of Viterbo (4 September)
- Saint Peter Claver (9 September)
- Saint Gregory the Illuminator (1 October)
- Purity of the Blessed Virgin Mary (16 October)
- Feast of the Holy Redeemer (23 October)
- The Sacred Relics (5 November)
- Saint Stanislaus Kostka (13 November)
- Our Lady Mother of Divine Providence (Saturday after the 3rd Sunday in November)
- St. Leonard of Port Maurice (26 November)
- Our Lady of the Miraculous Medal (27 November)

== See also ==
- General Roman Calendar
- Tridentine calendar
- General Roman Calendar of 1954
- General Roman Calendar of 1960
- General Roman Calendar of 1969
