= Traditional Catholic Calendar =

Traditional Catholic Calendar may refer to:

- Tridentine calendar
- General Roman Calendar of 1954
- General Roman Calendar of Pope Pius XII
- General Roman Calendar of 1960
