= Tridentine calendar =

16th-century Roman Catholic calendar of saints

The Tridentine calendar is the calendar of saints to be honoured in the course of the liturgical year in the official liturgy of the Roman Rite as reformed by Pope Pius V and first issued in 1568, implementing a decision of the Council of Trent, which entrusted the task to the Pope.

The text of the Tridentine calendar can be found in the original editions of the Tridentine Roman Breviary and of the Tridentine Roman Missal.

Use of both these texts, which included Pius V's revised calendar, was made obligatory throughout the Latin Church except where other texts of at least two centuries' antiquity were in use, and departures from it were not allowed. The Apostolic Constitution Quod a nobis, which imposed use of the Tridentine Roman Breviary, and the corresponding Apostolic Constitution Quo primum concerning the Tridentine Roman Missal both decreed: "No one whosoever is permitted to alter this letter or heedlessly to venture to go contrary to this notice of Our permission, statute, ordinance, command, precept, grant, indult, declaration, will, decree and prohibition. Should anyone, however, presume to commit such an act, he should know that he will incur the wrath of Almighty God and of the Blessed Apostles Peter and Paul."

== Later editions of the Roman calendar ==
Soon after the publication of this 1907 table, Pope Pius X made a general revision of the rubrics of the calendar, the result of which (with a few additions by Pope Pius XI) can be seen in General Roman Calendar of 1954. This was followed by Pope Pius XII's simplifying revision of 1955 (see General Roman Calendar of Pope Pius XII).

Pope	Date	Doubles, I Class	Doubles, II Class	Greater Doubles	Doubles	Semidoubles	Total
Pius V	1568	19	17	0	53	60	149
Clement VIII	1602	19	18	16	43	68	164
Urban VIII	1631	19	18	16	45	78	176
Leo XIII	1882	21	18	24	128	74	265
Pius X	1907	23	27	25	133	72	280

John XXIII's General Roman Calendar of 1960 reduced the number of celebrations and completely abandoned the ranking as Doubles, Simples, etc.

The General Roman Calendar of 1969 has subsequent adjustments and is currently in general use in the Latin Church (the present General Roman Calendar, observed for instance by the Pope himself).

== The Tridentine calendar ==
=== January ===
- 1 January: Circumcision of the Lord, Double.
- 2 January: Octave of St. Stephen, Double, with commemoration of octaves.
- 3 January: Octave of St. John, Double, with commemoration of the octave of the Holy Innocents.
- 4 January: Octave of the Holy Innocents, Double
- 5 January: Vigil.
- 6 January: Epiphany of the Lord, Double.
- 7 January: Of the Octave of the Epiphany.
- 8 January: Of the Octave.
- 9 January: Of the Octave.
- 10 January: Of the Octave.
- 11 January: Of the Octave of the Epiphany, and commemoration of St Hyginus pope and martyr.
- 12 January: Of the octave.
- 13 January: Octave of the Epiphany, Double.
- 14 January: Hilary bishop and confessor, Semidouble, transferred from yesterday, with commemoration of St Felix Priest and martyr.
- 15 January: Paul the First Hermit, confessor, Semidouble, transferred from 10 January, with commemoration of St Maurus, abbot.
- 16 January: Marcellus pope and martyr, Semidouble.
- 17 January: Anthony Abbot, Double.
- 18 January: Chair of St Peter at Rome, Double, and commemoration of St Prisca virgin and martyr.
- 19 January: Marius, Martha, Audifax, and Abachum martyrs.
- 20 January: Fabian and Sebastian martyrs, Double.
- 21 January: Agnes virgin and martyr, Double.
- 22 January: Vincent and Anastasius martyrs, Semidouble.
- 23 January: Emerentiana virgin and martyr.
- 24 January: Timothy bishop and martyr.
- 25 January: Conversion of St Paul Apostle, Double.
- 26 January: Polycarp bishop and martyr.
- 27 January: John Chrysostom bishop and confessor, Double.
- 28 January: Agnes second.
- 29 January:
- 30 January:
- 31 January:

=== February ===
- 1 February: Ignatius bishop and martyr, Semidouble.
- 2 February: Purification of Blessed Mary, Double.
- 3 February: Blase bishop and martyr.
- 4 February:
- 5 February: Agatha virgin and martyr, Semidouble.
- 6 February: Dorothy virgin and martyr.
- 7 February:
- 8 February:
- 9 February: Apollonia virgin and martyr.
- 10 February:
- 11 February:
- 12 February:
- 13 February:
- 14 February: Valentine Priest and martyr.
- 15 February: Faustinus and Jovita martyrs.
- 16 February:
- 17 February:
- 18 February: Simeon bishop and martyr.
- 19 February:
- 20 February:
- 21 February:
- 22 February: Chair of St Peter at Antioch, Double.
- 23 February: Vigil.
- 24 February: Matthias Apostle, Double.
- 25 February:
- 26 February:
- 27 February:
- 28 February:

In leap years, a day is added and it is of 29 days but the Feast of St. Matthias is celebrated on the 25th day and then is said twice Sexto Kalendas, that is on the 24th and 25th day, and thus the Dominical letter is changed to the one above, that if it be B, into A, if it be C, into B, similarly also in the others.

=== March ===
- 1 March:
- 2 March:
- 3 March:
- 4 March:
- 5 March:
- 6 March:
- 7 March: Thomas Aquinas confessor, Double, and commemoration of Perpetua and Felicity martyrs.
- 8 March:
- 9 March: The Forty Holy Martyrs, Semidouble.
- 10 March:
- 11 March:
- 12 March: Gregory pope and confessor, and Doctor of the Church, Double.
- 13 March:
- 14 March:
- 15 March:
- 16 March:
- 17 March:
- 18 March:
- 19 March: Joseph confessor, Double.
- 20 March:
- 21 March: Benedict Abbot, Double.
- 22 March:
- 23 March:
- 24 March:
- 25 March: Annunciation of Blessed Mary, Double.
- 26 March:
- 27 March:
- 28 March:
- 29 March:
- 30 March:
- 31 March:

=== April ===
- 1 April:
- 2 April:
- 3 April:
- 4 April:
- 5 April:
- 6 April:
- 7 April:
- 8 April:
- 9 April:
- 10 April:
- 11 April: Leo pope and confessor, Double.
- 12 April:
- 13 April:
- 14 April: Tiburtius, Valerian and Maximus, martyrs.
- 15 April:
- 16 April:
- 17 April: Anicetus pope and martyr
- 18 April:
- 19 April:
- 20 April:
- 21 April:
- 22 April: Soter and Caius popes and martyrs, Semidouble.
- 23 April: George martyr, Semidouble.
- 24 April:
- 25 April: Mark Evangelist, Double.
- 26 April: Cletus and Marcellinus popes and martyrs, Semidouble.
- 27 April:
- 28 April: Vitalis martyr.
- 29 April:
- 30 April:

=== May ===
- 1 May: Philip and James Apostles, Double.
- 2 May: Athanasius bishop and confessor, Double.
- 3 May: Invention of the Holy Cross, Double, and commemoration of Ss Alexander, Eventius and Theodulus martyrs, and Juvenal bishop and confessor.
- 4 May: Monica Widow.
- 5 May: Pope Saint Pius V
- 6 May: John before the Latin Gate, Double.
- 7 May: Saint Stanislaus Szczepanowski
- 8 May: Apparition of St. Michael, Double.
- 9 May: Gregory the Theologian bishop and confessor, Double.
- 10 May: Gordian and Epimachus martyrs.
- 11 May:
- 12 May: Nereus, Achilleus, and Pancras martyrs.
- 13 May:
- 14 May: Boniface martyr.
- 15 May:
- 16 May:
- 17 May:
- 18 May:
- 19 May: Pudentiana virgin.
- 20 May:
- 21 May:
- 22 May:
- 23 May:
- 24 May:
- 25 May: Urban pope and martyr.
- 26 May: Eleutherius pope and martyr.
- 27 May: John pope and martyr
- 28 May:
- 29 May:
- 30 May: Felix I pope and martyr.
- 31 May: Petronilla virgin.

=== June ===
- 1 June:
- 2 June: Marcellinus, Peter and Erasmus martyrs.
- 3 June:
- 4 June:
- 5 June:
- 6 June:
- 7 June:
- 8 June:
- 9 June: Primus and Felician martyrs.
- 10 June:
- 11 June: Barnabas Apostle, Double.
- 12 June: Basilides, Cyrinus, Nabor and Nazarius martyrs.
- 13 June:
- 14 June: Basil bishop and confessor, Double.
- 15 June: Vitus, Modestus, and Crescentia martyrs.
- 16 June:
- 17 June:
- 18 June: Mark and Marcellianus Brothers, martyrs.
- 19 June: Gervase and Protase martyrs.
- 20 June: Silverius pope and martyr.
- 21 June:
- 22 June: Paulinus bishop and confessor
- 23 June: Vigil.
- 24 June: Nativity of St. John the Baptist, Double.
- 25 June: Of the octave of the Nativity of St. John the Baptist.
- 26 June: John and Paul martyrs, Semidouble, with commemoration of the octave of the Nativity of St. John the Baptist.
- 27 June: Of the octave of the Nativity of St. John the Baptist.
- 28 June: Leo II pope and confessor, Semidouble, with commemoration of the Octave and of the Vigil.
- 29 June: Peter and Paul Apostles, Double.
- 30 June: Commemoration of St Paul Apostle, Double, with commemoration of the Octave of St John.

=== July ===
- 1 July: Octave of St. John the Baptist, Double, with commemoration of the octave of the Apostles.
- 2 July: Visitation of Blessed Mary, Double, with commemoration of the Apostles and of Ss. Processus and Martinian martyrs.
- 3 July: Of the octave of the Apostles.
- 4 July: Of the octave.
- 5 July: Of the octave.
- 6 July: Octave of the Apostles Peter and Paul, Double.
- 7 July:
- 8 July:
- 9 July:
- 10 July: The Seven Brothers martyrs and Ss. Rufina and Secunda virgins and martyrs, Semidouble.
- 11 July: Pius pope and martyr.
- 12 July: Nabor and Felix martyrs.
- 13 July: Anacletus pope and martyr, Semidouble.
- 14 July: Bonaventure bishop and confessor, Semidouble.
- 15 July:
- 16 July:
- 17 July: Alexius confessor.
- 18 July: Symphorosa with her seven sons martyrs.
- 19 July:
- 20 July: Margaret virgin and martyr.
- 21 July: Praxedes virgin.
- 22 July: Mary Magdalene, Double.
- 23 July: Apollinaris bishop and martyr, Semidouble.
- 24 July: Vigil, and commemoration of Saint Christina virgin and martyr.
- 25 July: James Apostle, Double and commemoration of Saint Christopher martyr in private Masses.
- 26 July:
- 27 July: Pantaleon martyr.
- 28 July: Nazarius, Celsus, and Victor pope and martyr, and Innocent pope and confessor, Semidouble.
- 29 July: Martha virgin, Semidouble, and commemoration of Ss Felix, pope, Simplicius, Faustinus, and Beatrice martyrs.
- 30 July: Abdon and Sennen martyrs.
- 31 July:

=== August ===
- 1 August: Peter in Chains, Double, and commemoration of the Holy Machabees martyrs.
- 2 August: Stephen pope and martyr.
- 3 August: Invention of Saint Stephen protomartyr, Semidouble.
- 4 August: Dominic confessor, Double.
- 5 August: Dedication of Our Lady of the Snows, Double.
- 6 August: Transfiguration of the Lord, Double and commemoration of Ss. Xystus the Second pope, Felicissimus, and Agapitus martyrs.
- 7 August: Donatus bishop and martyr.
- 8 August: Cyriacus, Largus and Smaragdus martyrs, Semidouble.
- 9 August: Vigil, and commemoration of St. Romanus martyr.
- 10 August: Laurence martyr, Double.
- 11 August: Of the octave of St Laurence with commemoration of Saint Tiburtius and Saint Susanna martyrs.
- 12 August: Of the octave and commemoration of St Clare virgin.
- 13 August: Of the octave and commemoration of St Hippolytus and his companions and of Cassian martyrs.
- 14 August: Of the octave with commemoration of the Vigil and of St Eusebius confessor.
- 15 August: Assumption of the Blessed Virgin Mary, Double.
- 16 August: Of the octave of the Assumption of Blessed Mary with commemoration of the Octave of St. Laurence.
- 17 August: Octave of St. Laurence, Double, and commemoration of the Octave of the Assumption.
- 18 August: Of the octave, and commemoration of St Agapitus martyr.
- 19 August: Of the octave.
- 20 August: Bernard Abbot, Double, with commemoration of the Octave of the Assumption.
- 21 August: Of the Octave.
- 22 August: Octave of the Assumption of Blessed Mary, Double, and commemoration of Ss Timothy, Hippolytus and Symphorian martyrs.
- 23 August: Vigil.
- 24 August: Bartholomew Apostle, Double. At Rome celebrated on the 25th.
- 25 August: Louis king of France, confessor.
- 26 August: Zephyrinus pope and martyr.
- 27 August:
- 28 August: Augustine bishop, confessor and Doctor of the Church, Double, and commemoration of Saint Hermes martyr.
- 29 August: Beheading of St. John the Baptist, Double, and commemoration of St Sabina martyr.
- 30 August: Felix and Adauctus martyrs.
- 31 August:

=== September ===
- 1 September: St. Giles Abbot, and commemoration of the Holy Twelve Brothers martyrs.
- 2 September:
- 3 September:
- 4 September:
- 5 September:
- 6 September:
- 7 September:
- 8 September: Nativity of Blessed Mary, Double, and commemoration of St. Adrian martyr in private Masses.
- 9 September: Of the Octave of Saint Mary and commemoration of St. Gorgonius martyr.
- 10 September: Of the octave.
- 11 September: Of the octave, and commemoration of Ss. Protus and Hyacinth martyrs.
- 12 September: Of the octave.
- 13 September: Of the octave.
- 14 September: Exaltation of the Holy Cross, Double, with commemoration of the Octave of the Nativity of St. Mary.
- 15 September: Octave of the Nativity of Blessed Mary, Double, with commemoration of St. Nicomedes martyr.
- 16 September: Cornelius and Cyprian bishops and martyrs, Semidouble, and commemoration of Ss Euphemia, Lucy and Geminianus martyrs.
- 17 September:
- 18 September:
- 19 September:
- 20 September: Vigil, and commemoration of St Eustace and Companions martyrs.
- 21 September: Matthew Apostle, Double.
- 22 September: Maurice and companions martyrs.
- 23 September: Linus pope and martyr, Semidouble, and commemoration of St Thecla virgin and martyr.
- 24 September:
- 25 September:
- 26 September: Cyprian and Justina martyrs.
- 27 September: Cosmas and Damian martyrs, Semidouble.
- 28 September:
- 29 September: Dedication of St Michael Archangel, Double.
- 30 September: Jerome Priest, confessor, and Doctor of the Church, Double.

=== October ===
- 1 October: Remigius bishop and confessor.
- 2 October:
- 3 October:
- 4 October: Francis confessor, Double.
- 5 October:
- 6 October:
- 7 October: Mark pope and confessor, and commemoration of Ss Sergius, Bacchus, Marcellus and Apuleius martyrs.
- 8 October:
- 9 October: Denis, Rusticus, and Eleutherius martyrs, Semidouble.
- 10 October:
- 11 October:
- 12 October:
- 13 October:
- 14 October: Callistus pope and martyr, Semidouble.
- 15 October:
- 16 October:
- 17 October:
- 18 October: Luke Evangelist, Double.
- 19 October:
- 20 October:
- 21 October: Hilarion Abbot, and commemoration of Saint Ursula and companions virgins and martyrs.
- 22 October:
- 23 October:
- 24 October:
- 25 October: Chrysanthus and Daria martyrs.
- 26 October: Evaristus pope and martyr.
- 27 October: Vigil.
- 28 October: Simon and Jude Apostles, Double.
- 29 October:
- 30 October:
- 31 October: Vigil.

=== November ===
- 1 November: Feast of all Saints, Double, and (in the calendar given in the 1568 Roman Breviary but not in the 1570 Roman Missal) commemoration of Caesarius martyr.
- 2 November: Commemoration of all the Faithful Departed, Double, and of the octave of all Saints.
- 3 November: Of the octave.
- 4 November: Of the octave and commemoration of Ss. Vitalis and Agricola martyrs.
- 5 November: Of the octave.
- 6 November: Of the octave.
- 7 November: Of the octave.
- 8 November: Octave of all Saints, Double, and commemoration of the Holy Four Crowned Martyrs.
- 9 November: Dedication of the Basilica of the Saviour, Double, and commemoration of St. Theodore martyr.
- 10 November: Tryphon, Respicius, and Nympha martyrs.
- 11 November: Martin bishop and confessor, Double, and commemoration of St. Menas martyr.
- 12 November: Martin pope and martyr, Semidouble.
- 13 November:
- 14 November:
- 15 November:
- 16 November:
- 17 November: Gregory Thaumaturgus bishop and confessor.
- 18 November: Dedication of the Basilicas of Peter, and Paul, Double
- 19 November: Pontianus pope and martyr.
- 20 November:
- 21 November:
- 22 November: Cecilia virgin and martyr, Semidouble.
- 23 November: Clement pope and martyr, Semidouble, and commemoration of St Felicitas martyr.
- 24 November: Chrysogonus martyr.
- 25 November: Catherine virgin and martyr, Double.
- 26 November: Peter of Alexandria bishop and martyr.
- 27 November:
- 28 November:
- 29 November: Vigil, and commemoration of Saturninus martyr.
- 30 November: Andrew Apostle, Double.

=== December ===
- 1 December:
- 2 December: Bibiana virgin and martyr.
- 3 December:
- 4 December: Barbara virgin and martyr, Commemoration.
- 5 December: Sabbas Abbot, Commemoration.
- 6 December: Nicholas bishop and confessor, Semidouble.
- 7 December: Ambrose bishop, confessor, and Doctor of the Church, Double.
- 8 December: Conception of Blessed Mary, Double.
- 9 December:
- 10 December: Melchiades pope and martyr, Commemoration.
- 11 December: Damasus pope and confessor, Semidouble.
- 12 December:
- 13 December: Saint Lucy virgin and martyr, Double.
- 14 December:
- 15 December:
- 16 December:
- 17 December:
- 18 December:
- 19 December:
- 20 December: Vigil.
- 21 December: Thomas the Apostle, Double.
- 22 December:
- 23 December:
- 24 December: Vigil.
- 25 December: Nativity of our Lord Jesus Christ, Double.
- 26 December: Stephen Protomartyr, Double and commemoration of the Octave of the Nativity.
- 27 December: John Apostle and Evangelist, Double and commemoration of the Octaves.
- 28 December: The Holy Innocents, Double and commemoration of the Octaves.
- 29 December: Thomas of Canterbury bishop and martyr, Semidouble, and commemoration of the Octaves.
- 30 December: Of the Sunday within the Octave of the Nativity, or of the Octave, with commemoration of the other Octaves.
- 31 December: Sylvester pope and confessor, Double, with commemoration of the Octaves.

== See also ==
- General Roman Calendar
- General Roman Calendar of 1954
- General Roman Calendar of Pope Pius XII
- General Roman Calendar of 1960
- General Roman Calendar of 1969
- List of saints
- Roman Missal
- Tridentine Mass
