= Rufina and Secunda =

Roman virgin-martyrs and Christian saints

Saints Rufina and Secunda
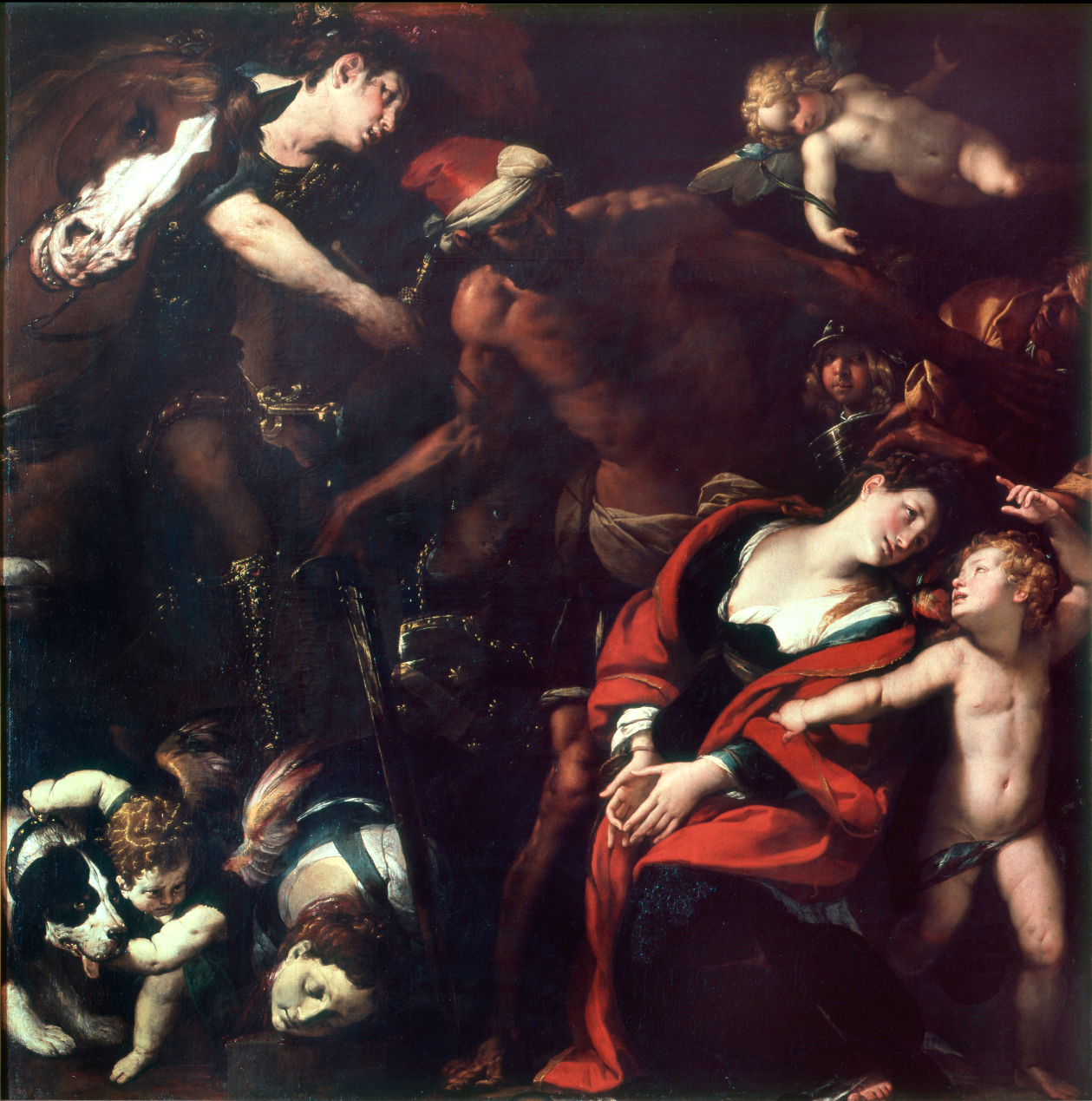
- The Martyrdom of Saints Secunda and Rufina. Collaborative painting by Il Morazzone, Giulio Cesare Procaccini, and Giovanni Battista Crespi (1620–1625)

Virgin martyrs
- Born: 3rd century Rome, Roman Empire
- Died: 257; Rome
- Venerated in: Catholic Church
- Canonized: Pre-Congregation
- Feast: July 10
- Attributes: floating in the Tiber River with weights attached to their necks

Rufina and Secunda (died 257) were Roman virgin-martyrs and Christian saints. Their feast day is celebrated on 10 July.

== Legend ==
According to the legendary Acts, they suffered in 257 during the persecution of Emperor Valerian.

Their legend states that they were daughters of a Roman senator named Asterius. Their fiancés, Armentarius and Verinus, were Christians, but renounced their faith when Valerian began his persecutions. Escaping to Etruria, Rufina and Secunda were captured and brought before a prefect, who tortured and then beheaded them.

Their bodies were buried on the Via Aurelia and the church of Sante Rufina e Secunda in Rome was dedicated to them.

== Historicity ==
In the notes attached to the publication of Pope Paul VI's 1969 revision of the General Roman Calendar, it is stated that of these two saints, whose feast was inserted into the Roman Calendar in the 12th century on the occasion of the transfer of their relics to the Lateran Basilica, nothing is really known except their names and the fact that they were buried at the ninth milestone of the Via Cornelia.

They are mentioned in the Bern manuscript of the Martyrologium Hieronymianum, and are recorded also in seventh century Itineraries as on the Via Cornelia, where Pope Damasus I erected a Basilica over their grave. The town on this spot, Santa Rufina, became the See of one of the suburbicarian dioceses that was later united with Porto as Porto-Santa Rufina.

== Feast day ==
The feast day of Sts Rufina and Secunda was included in the Tridentine calendar as a "semi-double". The General Roman Calendar of Pope Pius XII reduced it to a "simple", and in the General Roman Calendar of 1960 it became a third-class feast. According to the Roman Missal, they may now be celebrated everywhere with their own Mass on their feast day, unless in some locality an obligatory celebration is assigned to that day.

== In art ==
Rufina and Secunda are sometimes depicted as two maidens floating in the Tiber River with weights attached to their necks.

In the 1620s, the Italian painters Il Morazzone, Giulio Cesare Procaccini, and Giovanni Battista Crespi collaborated on the Martyrdom of Saints Rufina and Secunda, which was praised as "the painting by three hands".
