= Lucy and Geminian =

Saints Lucy and Geminian
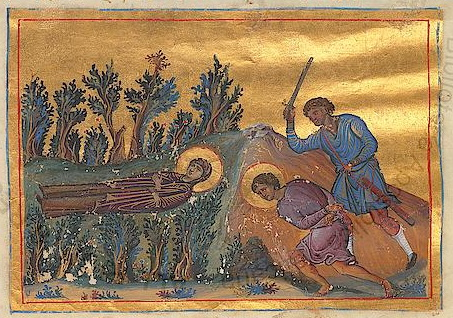

Martyrs
- Died: c. 300; Rome
- Venerated in: Roman Catholic Church; Eastern Orthodox Church
- Feast: 16 September (pre-1970 General Roman Calendar, a duplication of the 13 December feast); 17 September (Byzantine Rite)

Lucy and Geminian were venerated on 16 September as saints who died as martyrs in Rome during the persecution of Diocletian in about 290 or 300 or, more precisely, in 304. Veneration for them was ancient but their story is "only known from fabulous acts." Lucy appears to be in reality the same as the Lucy of Syracuse whose feast is on 13 December, but the Geminian who was venerated on 16 September seems to be a fictitious character, not to be confused with Geminianus, Bishop of Modena.

== Legend ==
According to the legend, Lucy was a 75-year-old widow and Geminian a young catechist. Lucy was accused by her son, Eutropius (or Euprepius), of being a Christian. She was brought before Diocletian, who at first attempted to dissuade her and then placed her in a cauldron of burning pitch; Lucy lived for three days in the cauldron. When Diocletian heard that she was still alive, he ordered her to be carried around the city, with weights loaded on her body.

When Lucy was paraded by Geminian's house, the statues of Roman gods in his home shattered miraculously and a dove made the sign of the cross over Geminian's head. He followed Lucy, asking for instruction in the Christian religion as well as baptism. A priest named Protasius helped him with his request. Seventy-five people were converted to Christianity by the example of Geminian. The judge presiding at their trial was thrown from his horse on a stone bridge; his body was never found. Lucy and Geminian were ultimately beheaded. They were buried by a woman named Maxima.

== General Roman Calendar ==
A commemoration of "Saints Lucy and Geminianus" was included in the Tridentine calendar and remained in the General Roman Calendar until 1969, but was then omitted as a duplication of the 13 December feast of Saint Lucy, while the Geminian mentioned in the legend of Saint Lucy seems to be a merely fictitious personage. Some traditional Catholics continue to observe the pre-1970 calendar.
