= Agapitus of Palestrina =

Martyr child saint

Saint Agapitus
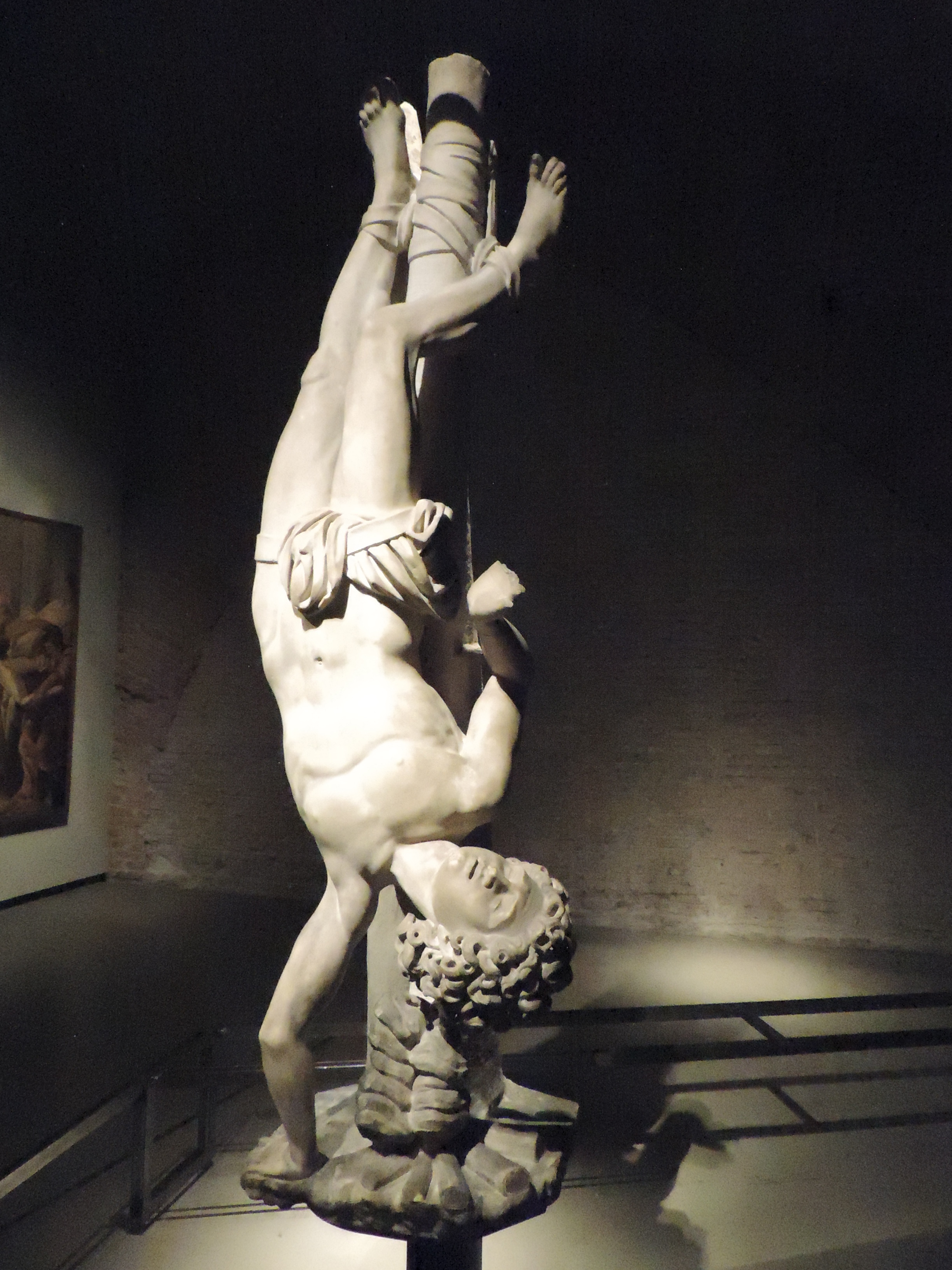
- Statue of St Agapitus by Marco Antonio Prestinari (ca. 1605–1607) in Museo del Duomo, Milan

Martyr
- Born: 3rd century AD; Latium
- Died: c. 267 AD or 274 AD; Palestrina, Lazio, Italy
- Venerated in: Roman Catholic Church; Eastern Orthodox Church
- Canonized: Pre-Congregation
- Major shrine: Cathedral of San Agapito, Palestrina
- Feast: April 18; August 18
- Patronage: Palestrina; invoked against colic

Agapitus (Italian: Agapito) is venerated as a martyr saint, who died on August 18, perhaps in 274, a date that the latest editions of the Roman Martyrology say is uncertain.

According to his legend, 16-year-old Agapitus, who may have been a member of the noble Anicia family of Palestrina, was condemned to death, under the prefect Antiochus and the Emperor Aurelian, for being a Christian. After being captured and tortured during the persecution of Aurelian, he was taken to the local arena in Palestrina and thrown to the wild beasts. However, the animals refused to touch him and so he was beheaded.

== Veneration ==
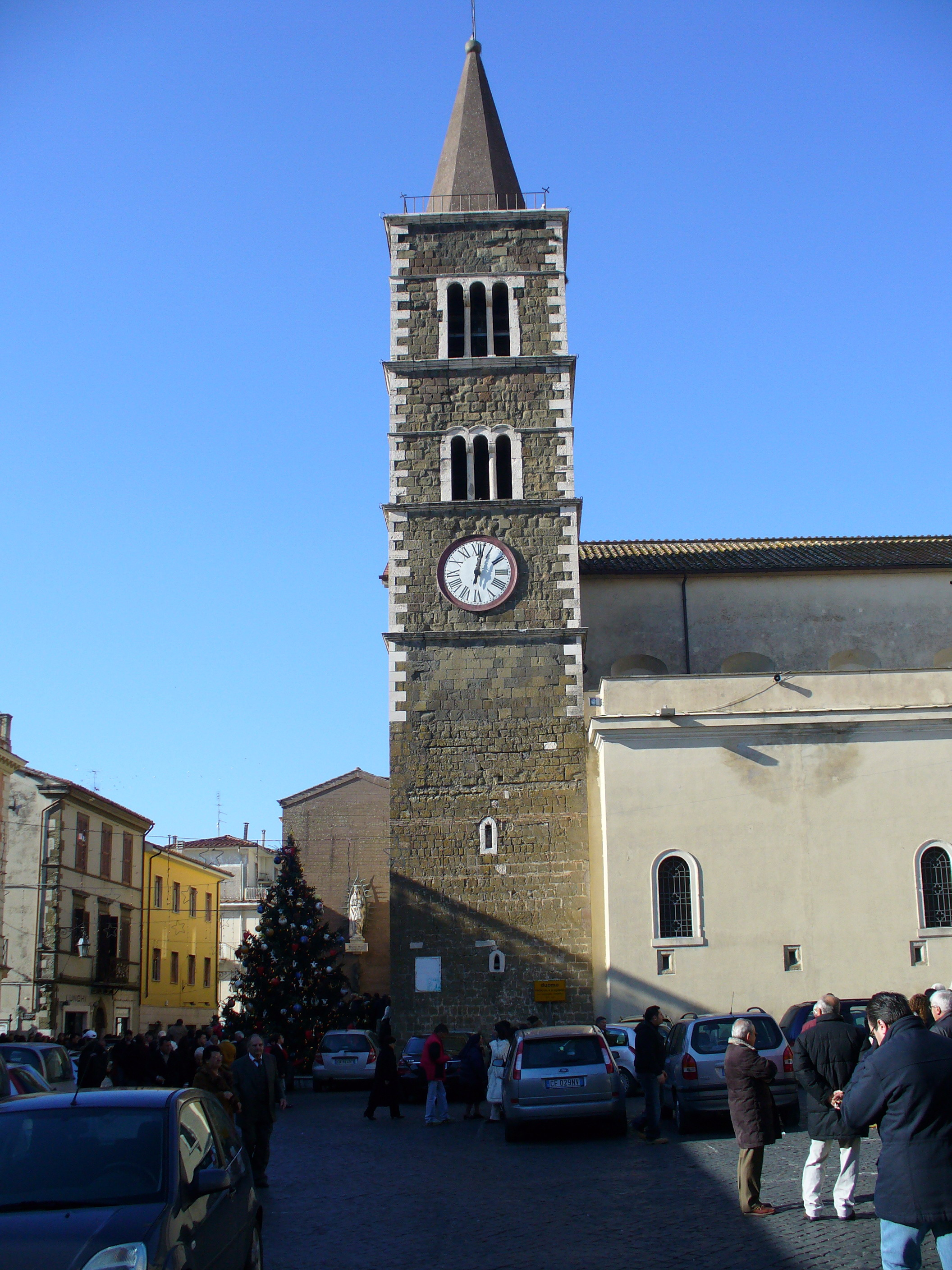
Cathedral of San Agapito, Palestrina.

Agapitus is mentioned in the ancient martyrologies, including the Martyrologium Hieronymianum of Jerome, the Fulda Martyrology. Based on doubts regarding the details of his martyrdom, some of which were related in earlier editions of the Roman Martyrology, editions from the end of the 20th century onward give only: "In Palestrina, Lazio, Saint Agapitus, martyr." Around the 5th century, Pope Felix III built a basilica in his honour on the supposed site of his martyrdom. His relics were kept in the basilica, and a cemetery grew around it. At some uncertain date, his relics were transferred to the present cathedral of Palestrina. Some of them were transferred to Besançon. and other places in Europe.

Agapitus is honoured in the Tridentine calendar by a commemoration added to the Mass and canonical hours in the liturgy of the day within the Octave of the Assumption. Pope Pius XII abolished all octaves apart from those of Christmas, Easter, and Pentecost, including that of the Assumption. Accordingly, in the General Roman Calendar of 1960 the celebration of Saint Agapitus appears as a commemoration in the ordinary weekday Mass.
