= Boniface of Tarsus =

Catholic and Eastern Orthodox martyr

Saint Boniface of Tarsus
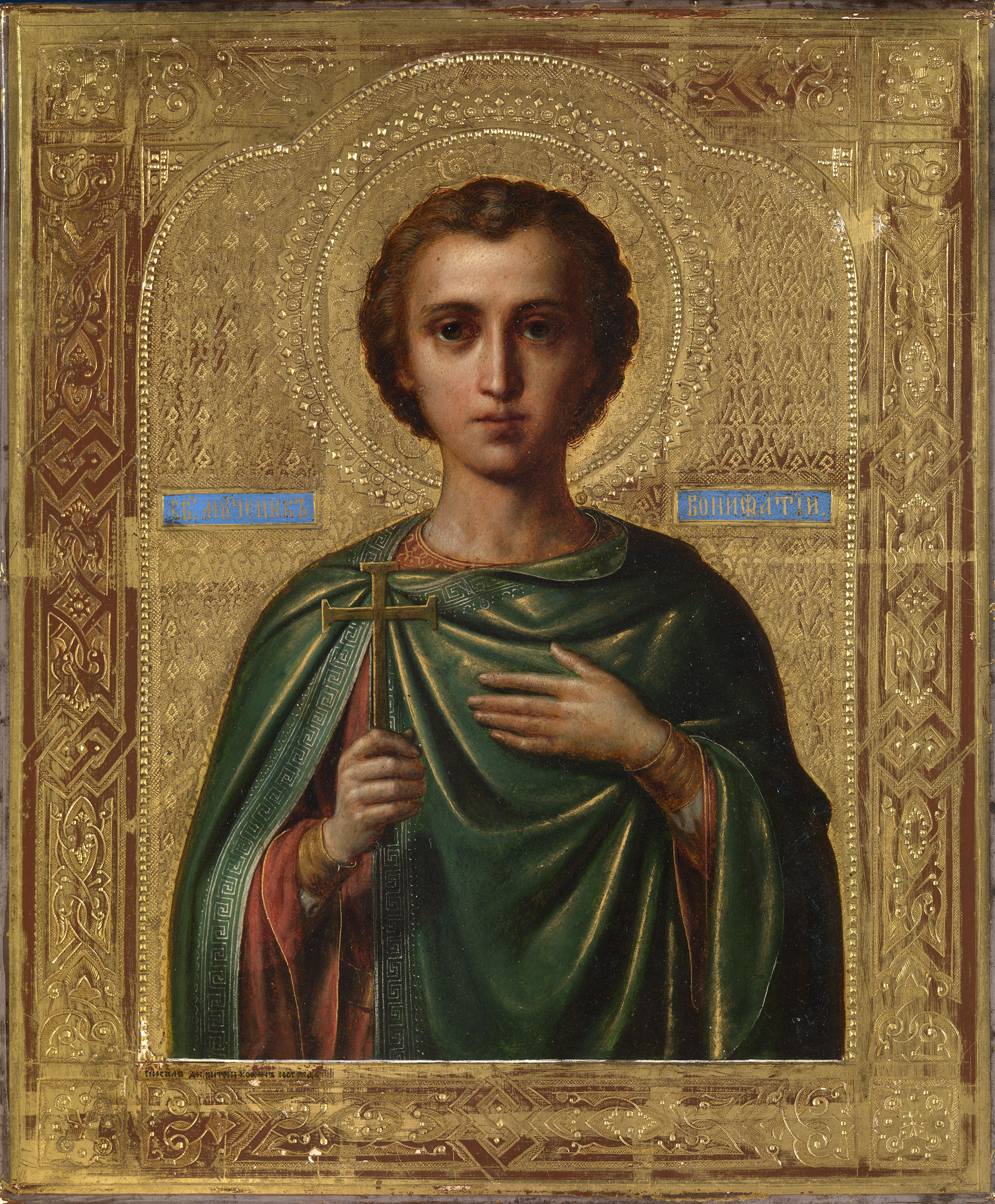

Martyr
- Born: Third century Rome (modern-day Italy)
- Died: Tarsus, Cilicia (modern-day Tarsus, Mersin, Turkey)
- Venerated in: Catholic Church; Eastern Orthodox Church
- Canonized: Pre-Congregation
- Feast: 19 December (Eastern Orthodox Church; 14 May in pre-1969 General Roman Calendar

Saint Boniface of Tarsus (Greek: Βονιφάτιος) was, according to legend, executed for being a Christian in the year 307 at Tarsus, where he had gone from Rome in order to bring back to his mistress Aglaida (also written Aglaia) relics of the martyrs.

== Biography ==
Aglaida and Boniface (painting by Alexandre Cabanel)

Boniface was one of Aglaida's slaves, the steward of her household. Both were pagans and lived in debauchery together; some legends say they were lovers. Nevertheless, he was generous to the poor, hospitable to strangers, and compassionate to those in misfortune.

Hearing of reported miracles of healing in connection with the relics of martyrs, Aglaida decided to send him on an errand to collect holy relics. Finding upon arrival at Tarsus that the authorities were torturing Christians, he openly declared himself to be a Christian. After various tortures, he was beheaded with a sword. His own body constituted the relics that were brought back to Aglaida, who in turn became a Christian.

In his memory she constructed a church, which today is the Church of Santi Bonifacio e Alessio. She distributed her wealth to the poor and lived in a monastery for 15 years. She apparently received the divine gift to exorcise evil spirits.

== Veneration ==
The Eastern Orthodox Church celebrates both of them on 19 December as the "Martyr Boniface at Tarsus in Cilicia and Righteous Aglaida of Rome". He is invoked against drunkenness.

In the 12th century, the name of Boniface (without Aglaida) was included on 14 May in the General Roman Calendar with the lowest rank of feast ("simple"). In 1955, Pope Pius XII reduced the celebration to a commemoration within the ferial Mass (see General Roman Calendar of Pope Pius XII). Because of the totally fabulous character of the story, the 1969 revision of the General Roman Calendar removed entirely the mention of this Boniface, who also is not among the nine saints of this name that the Roman Martyrology recognizes.

Because of the date of his feast, Boniface of Tarsus was one of three who, because a cold spell was believed to be common on 12–14 May, were called the Ice Saints in Switzerland, Poland, Bohemia and eastern Germany, a tradition known also to Martin Luther.
