= Simplicius, Faustinus and Beatrix =

Christian saints and martyrs

Saints Simplicius, Faustinus and Beatrix
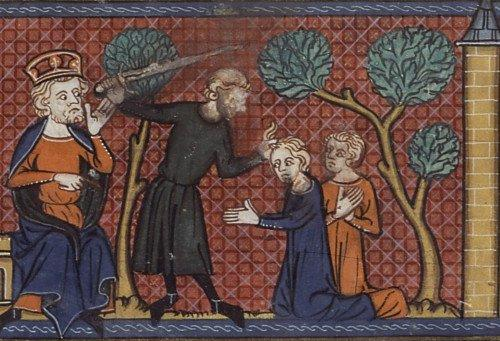
- The Martyrdom of Saints Simplicius and Faustinus. From a 14th-century manuscript.

Martyrs
- Died: 302 or 303
- Venerated in: Catholic Church
- Canonized: Pre-Congregation
- Major shrine: Santa Maria Maggiore
- Feast: July 29
- Attributes: Saint Simplicius is represented with a pennant, on the shield of which are three lilies, called the crest of Simplicius; the lilies are a symbol of purity of heart. Saint Beatrix has a cord in her hand, because she was strangled.

Saints Simplicius, Faustinus and Beatrix (or Beatrice, Viatrix) were siblings martyred in Rome during the Diocletianic Persecution (302 or 303).

== Legend ==
The legend about them is that the brothers Simplicius and Faustinus were cruelly tortured on account of their Christian faith, beaten with clubs, and finally beheaded; their bodies were thrown into the Tiber (according to another version a stone was tied to them and they were drowned). Their sister Beatrix had the bodies drawn out of the water and buried. Beatrix is thought to be a manuscript corruption of the name "Viatrix".

Then for seven months she lived with a pious woman named Lucina and together they secretly helped persecuted Christians. Finally she was discovered and arrested. Her accuser was Lucretius, a neighboring kinsman, who desired to obtain possession of her lands. She asserted before the judge that she would never sacrifice to demons, because she was a Christian. As punishment, she was strangled in prison. Her friend Lucina buried her with her brothers in the cemetery ad Ursum Pileatum on the Via Portuensis.

Divine punishment soon overtook the accuser Lucretius, who at a feast was mocking the folly of the martyrs. A small child cried out, "Thou hast committed murder and hast taken unjust possession of land. Thou art a slave of the devil." And the devil at once took possession of him and tortured him for three hours, eventually throwing him into a bottomless pit. The terror of those present was so great that they became Christians. This is the story of the legend. Trustworthy Acts concerning the history of the two brothers and sister are no longer in existence.

== Veneration ==
Of these martyrs, apart from their names, nothing is known except that they were buried on July 29 in the Cemetery of Generosa on the Via Portuensis. Their feast day is thus July 29. Because of the extremely limited knowledge about them, they are no longer included in the General Roman Calendar, but, since they are included in the Roman Martyrology, they continue to be officially venerated and may be included in local liturgical calendars. From the time of the Tridentine calendar until 1969, the General Roman Calendar included a commemoration of them within the liturgy of Saint Martha on July 29.

Pope Leo II (682–683) translated their relics to a church which he had built in Rome in honor of Santa Bibiana. Later the greater part of the relics of the martyrs were taken to the Church of Santa Maria Maggiore.

The Benedictine Sisters of Perpetual Adoration have relics purported to be those of Saint Beatrice at their monastery in Clyde, Missouri, where a wax effigy of the saint lies in a glass case.

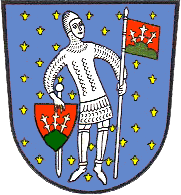
Lauterbach, coat of arms

=== Patronage ===
Saint Simplicius is the patron saint of Lauterbach and one of the patrons of the city of Fulda. Images of Simplicius can be found on monuments, house facades and as a work of art throughout Lauterbach.

=== Iconography ===
Saint Simplicius is represented in art with a pennant, on the shield of which are three lilies, called the crest of Simplicius; the lilies are a symbol of purity of heart. Saint Beatrix is portrayed with a cord in her hand, because she was strangled. Their feast day is July 29.
