= Basilides, Cyrinus, Nabor and Nazarius =

Italian Roman Catholic saints

Saint Nazarius and Companions
- Died: ~303 AD
- Venerated in: Catholic Church
- Feast: 12 June

Basilides, Cyrinus, Nabor and Nazarius are saints of the Catholic Church, mentioned in the Martyrology of Bede and earlier editions of the Roman Martyrology for 12 June as four Roman martyrs who suffered death under Diocletian.

It has been said that their names were taken from the Martyrologium Hieronymianum, in the Bern MS., where it says: Romæ, via Aurelia miliario V, Basiledis, Tribuli, Nagesi, Magdaletis, Zabini, Aureli, Cirini, Nabori, Nazari, Donatellæ, Secundæ. The second name in the list, Tribulus, is derived from a place-name, Tripoli, as is evident from the Echternach MS., and those following it have also an African origin.

The group of three supposedly Roman saints, Cyrinus, Nabor, Nazarius, to which was later added Basilides, has in the "Sacramentarium Gelasianum" its special form of invocation in the Canon of the Mass. The date and the circumstances of their deaths are unknown.

In the Tridentine calendar, the four have a joint commemoration on 12 June, which was removed from the General Roman Calendar in 1969 because of the completely fabulous character of their Passio. The 12 June celebration was in reality a conflation of three distinct commemorations on the same day: the burial of Saint Basilides, a Roman martyr, on the Via Aurelia, the transfer on the Via Appia of the relics of Saint Quirinus of Sescia, and the dedication of the Basilica of the Milanese martyrs Nabor and Nazarius on the Via Aurelia.

Of the four named, the Roman Martyrology now mentions only Basilides among the saints honoured on 12 June.

In an ancient itinerary to the graves of the Roman martyrs, mention is made of a mortuary chapel of this martyr Basilides on the Via Aurelia.

The relics of Nazarius and Nabor were transferred by Chrodegang of Metz to his diocese, Nazarius specifically to Lorsch Abbey.
