= Marcellus and Apuleius =

Saint Marcellus
- Born: third or fourth century Capua, Campania
- Died: third or fourth century Capua, Campania
- Venerated in: Catholic Church Eastern orthodox church
- Canonized: pre-congregation
- Feast: 7 October

Marcellus and Apuleius were third- or fourth-century martyrs who were inserted in the General Roman Calendar in the 13th century. They were recognized as saints by the Catholic Church, with 7 October as their feast day. Apuleius is considered purely legendary, and is no longer recognized.

== Recognition ==
Marcellus was associated with a Saint Apuleius, which led to them being mentioned together in some editions of the Roman Martyrology. In the Tridentine calendar, Marcellus was commemorated with Apuleius and two other saints on 7 October, the feast day of Pope Mark. The Sacramentarium of Pope Gelasius assigned a mass to them. In 1716, this day became the feast of Our Lady of the Rosary, and the commemoration of Marcellus and Apuleius was moved to 8 October.

Marcellus were restored to 7 October in 1969 and Apuleius was expunged from the official list of saints of the Catholic Church, as without historical foundation. Although the veneration of the two saints is very old, their existing Acts are not genuine and agree to a great extent with those of Saints Nereus and Achilleus.

== Monks of Ramsgate account ==
The Monks of Ramsgate wrote in their Book of Saints (1921),

Apuleius and Marcellus (SS.) MM. (Oct.7)
(1st cent.) According to the Roman Martyrology, St. Apuleius and his fellow-martyr (by some said to have been his own brother), Marcellus, were at one time followers of Simon Magus, but were converted at sight of the miracles wrought by the Apostle St. Peter. They gained the crown of martyrdom under a judge by name Aurelian, and were burled without the walls of Rome. There is a tradition that it was they who interred the body of St. Peter on the Vatican Hill after his crucifixion, which they carried out "after the manner of the Jews", in order that in his tomb as in his death, the Apostle might be like to his Divine Master. SS. Apuleius and Marcellus are commemorated In all the ancient Martyrologles and in many Liturgies.

== Butler's account ==
The hagiographer Alban Butler (1710–1773) wrote in his Lives of the Fathers, Martyrs, and Other Principal Saints under October 7,

SS. Marcellus and Apuleius, MM., at Rome

FAMOUS in ancient Martyrologies, honoured with a mass in Pope Gelasius's Sacramentary published by Cardinal Thomasius. The Emperor Lewis II. in 872, received their relics from the pope, which his wife Angilberga bestowed on the nunnery which she founded at Placentia in Italy, in which city these martyrs are honoured with singular devotion.

== Sources ==
- Butler, Alban (1846), The Lives of the Fathers, Martyrs, and Other Principal Saints, D. & J. Sadlier
- Calendarium Romanum, Libreria Editrice Vaticana, 1969
- Löffler; Klemens (1912), "Sergius and Bacchus", The Catholic Encyclopedia, vol. 13, New York: Robert Appleton Company This article incorporates text from this source, which is in the public domain.
- Martyrologium Romanum, Libreria Editrice Vaticana, 2001
- St. Augustine's Abbey, Ramsgate (1921). The Book of saints : a dictionary of servants of God canonized by the Catholic Church. London: A. & C. Black, ltd. OCLC 671676136. This article incorporates text from this source, which is in the public domain.
