= Feast of the Prayer of Christ =

The Feast of the Prayer of Christ is a former feast of the Roman Catholic liturgical year.
