= Commemoration of the Passion of Christ =

The Commemoration of the Passion of Christ was a feast of the Roman Catholic Church, listed in the Roman Missal up to 1962 as observed in some places, and kept on the Tuesday after Sexagesima. Its object is the devout remembrance and honour of Christ's sufferings for the redemption of mankind.

== History ==
Whilst the feast in honour of the instruments of Christ's Passion—the Holy Cross, Lance, Nails, and Crown of Thorns—called "Arma Christi", originated during the Middle Ages, this commemoration is of more recent origin. It appears for the first time in the Breviary of Meissen (1517) as a festum simplex for 15 November. The same Breviary has a feast of the Holy Face for 15 January and of the Holy Name for 15 March.

These feasts disappeared with the introduction of Lutheranism. As found in the appendix of the Roman Breviary, it was initiated by Paul of the Cross (d. 1775). The Office was composed by Tommaso Struzzieri, Bishop of Todi, the associate of St. Paul.

This Office and the corresponding feast were approved by Pope Pius VI (1775–99) for the Discalced Clerics of the Holy Cross and the Passion of Christ (commonly called Passionists), founded by Paul of the Cross. The feast is celebrated by them as a double of the first class with an octave. At the same time Pius VI approved the other Offices and feasts of the Mysteries of Christ's Passion: the Feast of the Prayer of Our Lord in the Garden (Tuesday after Septuagesima); the Feast of the Crown of Thorns (Friday after Ash-Wednesday); the Holy Lance and Nails (Friday after the first Sunday in Lent); and for the following Fridays: the feasts of the Holy Winding Sheet, the Five Wounds, and the Precious Blood of Christ (cf. appendix to the Roman Breviary).

These feasts were, at least in part, adopted by many dioceses and religious orders. Most of them are found in the proprium of Salerno (a. 1798), as also is the feast of the Passion (a double of the first class with an octave). This latter feast was celebrated with an octave in all the dioceses of the former Kingdom of Naples.

On 30 August 1809, the privilege of the feast (double major) was granted to the Diocese of Leghorn for the Friday before Passion Sunday. In the old St. Louis Ordo (1824) it was assigned to Friday after Ash-Wednesday, which day it still retains in the Baltimore Ordo. The seven Offices of the Mysteries of the Passion of Christ were adopted by the City of Rome in 1831 and since then all the dioceses that have the feast of the Passion of Christ in their calendar keep it on the Tuesday after Sexagesima.

By permission of Pope Leo XIII (8 May 1884) the octave in the calendar of the Passionists is privileged and admits only feasts of the first and second class. By a decree of 5 July 1883, the votive office of the Passion of Christ may be said every Friday which is not taken up by a semi-double or a double Office, except during the period from Passion Sunday to Low Sunday and from 18 December to 13 January. The Office composed by Struzzieri is rich and full of pious sentiment; the hymns, however, are rather modern.
