= Tiburtius, Valerian, and Maximus =

Roman Christian martyrs

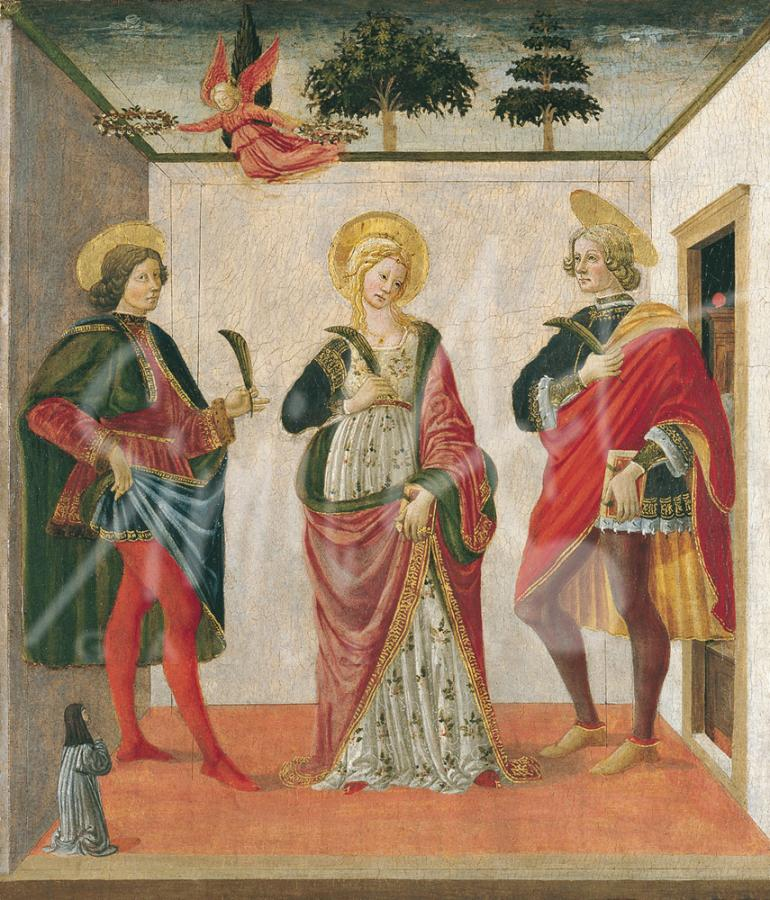
Saints Cecilia, Valerian, and Tiburtius by Botticini

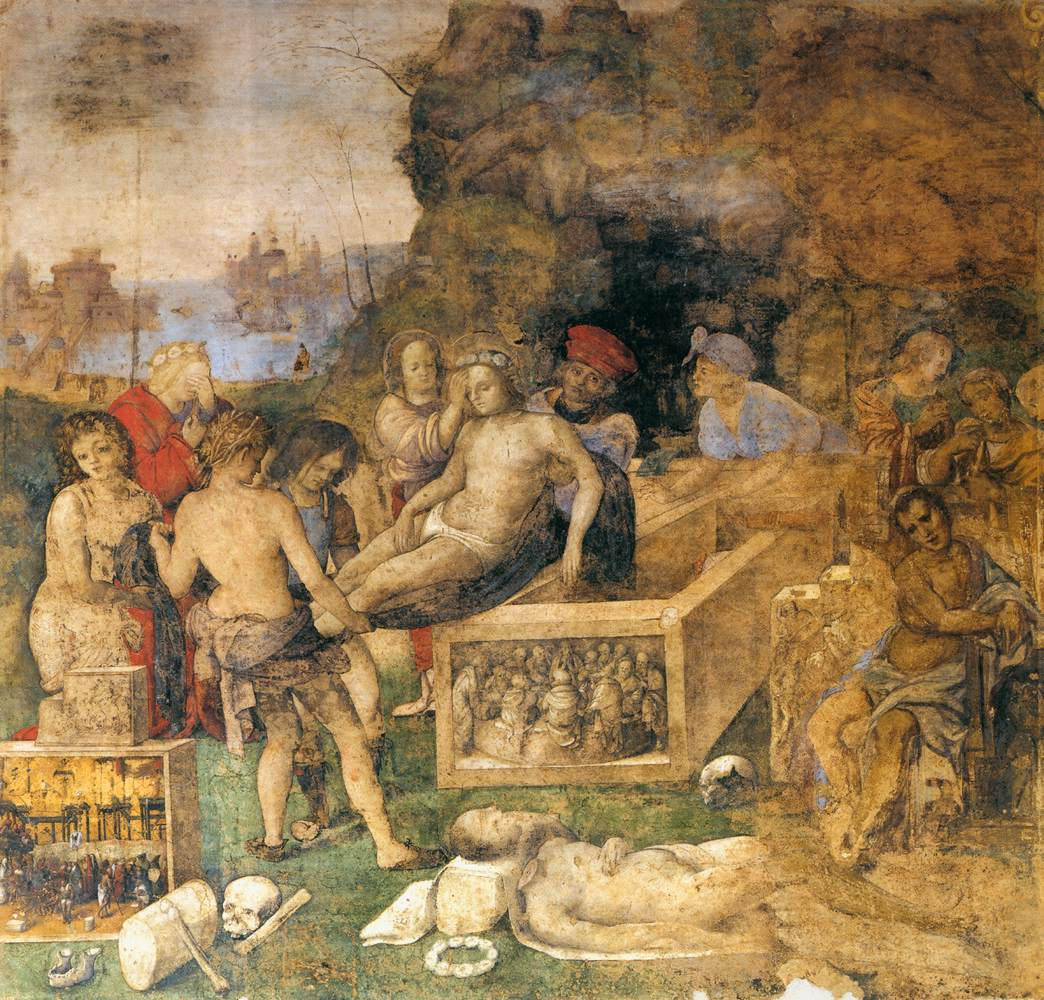
Amico Aspertini: Burial of Saints Valerian and Tiburtius

Saints Tiburtius, Valerian, and Maximus are three Christian martyrs who were buried on 14 April of some unspecified year in the Catacombs of Praetextatus on the Via Appia near Rome.

According to the legendary Acts of Saint Cecilia, a mid-fifth-century Acts of the Martyrs composition that has no historical value, Valerian was the husband of Saint Cecilia, Tiburtius his brother, and Maximus, a soldier or official who was martyred with these two. The story was retold by Chaucer. Devotional publications make the story more credible by simplifying it.

The three martyrs were traditionally honoured with a joint feast day on 14 April, as shown in the Tridentine calendar. The 1969 revision of the General Roman Calendar removed this celebration, since the only thing really known about them is the historical fact of their burial in the Catacombs of Praetextatus. However, it allowed them to be honoured in local calendars.

The 2001 decree of promulgation of the revised Roman Martyrology declared: "In accordance with the Constitution Sacrosanctum Concilium of the Second Vatican Ecumenical Council on the Sacred Liturgy, 'the accounts of martyrdom or the lives of the saints are to accord with the facts of history' (art. 92 c), the names of saints included in the Martyrology and their notices have to be subjected more carefully than before to the judgement of historical study."

Accordingly, the revised Roman Martyrology now merely states, under 14 April: "At Rome, in the cemetery of Praetextatus on the Appian Way, Saints Tiburtius, Valerian and Maximus, martyrs."

The Eastern Orthodox Church honors them together with Saint Cecilia on 22 November.
