= General Roman Calendar of 1969 =

Latest version of the General Roman Calendar

The seasons of the liturgical year of the Ordinary Form of the Roman Rite of the Latin Catholic Church.

The 1969 edition of the General Roman Calendar was promulgated on 1 January 1970 by Paul VI's Mysterii Paschalis. It is the current version of the General Roman Calendar.

== Selection of saints included ==
While canonization involves the addition of the saint's name to the Roman Martyrology, it does not necessarily involve the insertion of the saint's name also into the General Roman Calendar, which mentions only a very limited selection of canonized saints.

Compared to the previous edition of the calendar, around 200 saints were removed in the 1969 calendar, including Valentine and Christopher.

Christopher is recognized as a saint of the Catholic Church, being listed as a martyr in the Roman Martyrology under 25 July. In 1969, Paul VI issued the motu proprio Mysterii Paschalis. In it, he recognized that, while the written Acts of Saint Christopher are merely legendary, attestations to the veneration of the martyr date from ancient times. His change in the calendar of saints included "leaving the memorial of Saint Christopher to local calendars" because of the relatively late date of its insertion into the Roman calendar.

== Liturgical year ==
In the liturgical books, the document General Roman Calendar (which lists not only fixed celebrations but also some moveable ones) is printed immediately after the document Universal Norms on the Liturgical Year and the Calendar, which states that "throughout the course of the year the Church unfolds the entire mystery of Christ and observes the birthdays of the Saints". The birth of a saint to heaven is as a rule celebrated on a fixed day of the year (although sometimes they may be moved either to or from a Sunday), but the mysteries of Christ are often celebrated on dates that always vary from year to year. The Catholic Church's year combines two cycles of liturgical celebrations. One has been called the Proper of Time or Temporale, associated with the moveable date of Easter and the fixed date of Christmas. The other is associated with fixed calendar dates and has been called the Proper of Saints or Sanctorale. The General Roman Calendar includes celebrations that belong to the Proper of Time or Temporale and is not limited to those that make up the Proper of Saints or Sanctorale. An instance where two observances occur on the same date is called an occurrence.

== Transfer of celebrations ==
Some celebrations listed in the General Roman Calendar are transferred to another date:

For the pastoral advantage of the people, it is permissible to observe on the Sundays in Ordinary Time those celebrations that fall during the week and have special appeal to the devotion of the faithful, provided the celebrations take precedence over these Sundays in the Table of Liturgical Days.

== Updates ==
The General Calendar is printed, for instance, in the Roman Missal and the Liturgy of the Hours. These are up to date when printed, but additional feasts may be added later. For that reason, if those celebrating the liturgy have not inserted into the books a note about the changes, they must consult the current annual publication, known as the "Ordo", for their country or religious congregation. These annual publications, like those that, disregarding the feasts that are obligatory in the actual church where the liturgy is celebrated, list only celebrations included in the General Calendar, are useful only for the current year, since they omit celebrations impeded because of falling on a Sunday or during periods such as Holy Week and the Octave of Easter.

== Diocesan and parish calendars ==
The calendar for a diocese is typically based on a national calendar, with a few additions. For instance, the anniversary of the dedication of the cathedral is celebrated as a solemnity in the cathedral church and as a feast in all the other churches of the diocese. The feast day of the principal patron saint of the diocese is celebrated as a feast throughout the diocese.

== Reception ==
Louis Bouyer had harsh words concerning this version of the General Roman Calendar:

I prefer to say nothing, or little, about the new calendar, the handiwork of a trio of maniacs who suppressed, with no good reason, Septuagesima and the Octave of Pentecost and who scattered three quarters of the Saints higgledy-piggledy, all based on notions of their own devising! Because these three hotheads obstinately refused to change anything in their work and because the pope wanted to finish up quickly to avoid letting the chaos get out of hand, their project, however insane, was accepted!

— Louis Bouyer, Memoirs
