= Romanus Ostiarius =

Roman Christian martyr and saint (died c.258)

Saint Romanus Ostiarius
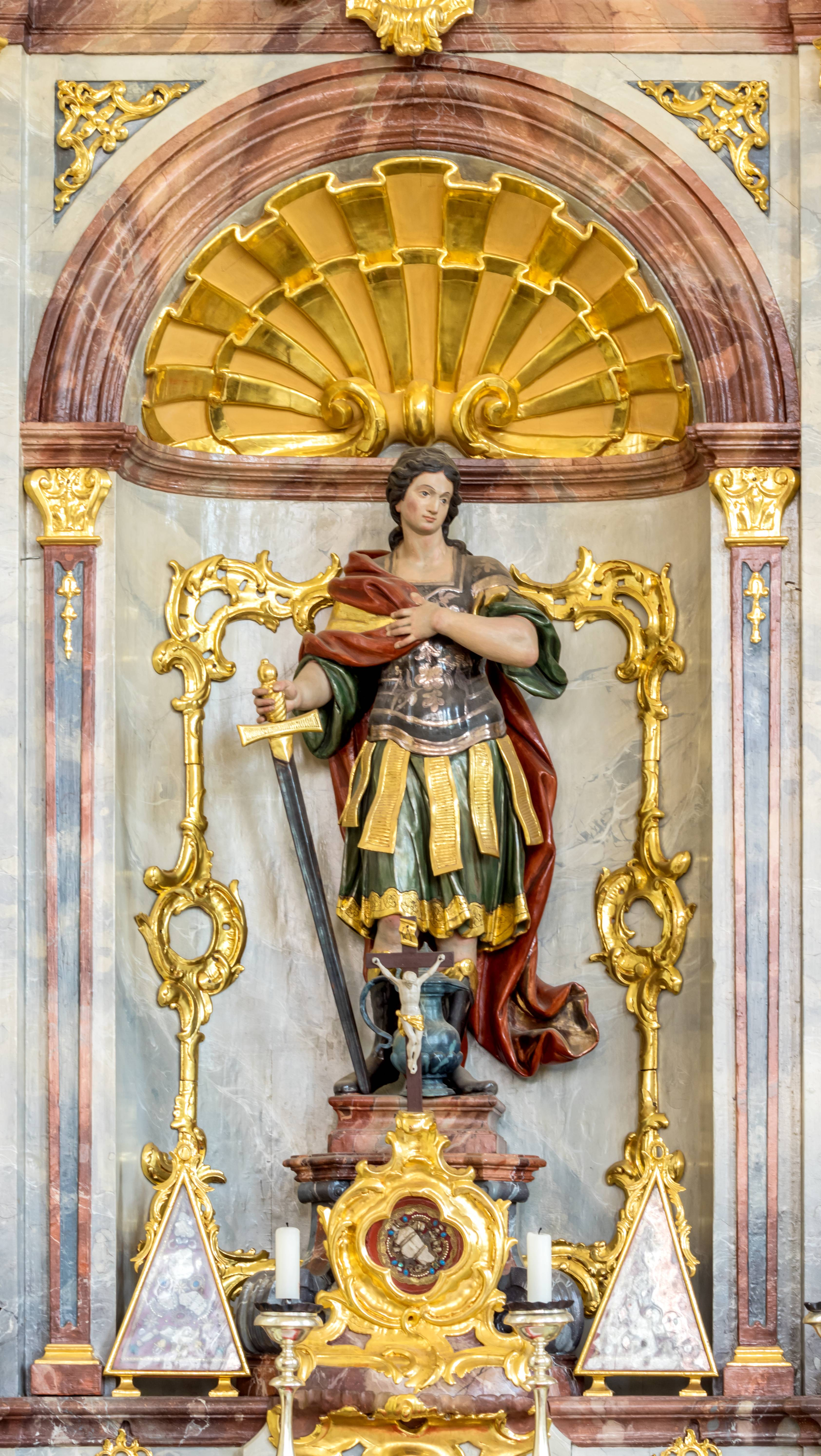

Martyr
- Died: c. 258
- Venerated in: Catholic Church; Eastern Orthodox Church
- Major shrine: Relics in the churches of San Lorenzo and Santa Catarina dei Funari, Rome
- Feast: August 9

Saint Romanus Ostiarius is a saint of the Catholic Church and Eastern Orthodox Church. His legend states that he was a soldier who converted to Christianity by the example of Saint Lawrence, who baptized Romanus after the soldier was imprisoned. He became a church ostiary in Rome and was later martyred.
