= Antipope Felix II =

Antipope from 355 to 365

- Papacy began: 355
- Papacy ended: 358
- Predecessor: Novatian
- Successor: Ursicinus
- Opposed to: Pope Liberius

Personal details
- Died: 22 November 365 Porto, Rome, Italy
- Denomination: Roman Catholic

Antipope Felix II (died 22 November 365) was installed as Pope in 355 AD after the Emperor Constantius II banished the reigning Pope, Liberius, for refusing to subscribe to a sentence of condemnation against Saint Athanasius. He was previously an Archdeacon of Rome.

== Biography ==
In May 357 AD the Roman laity, which had remained faithful to Liberius, demanded that Constantius, who was on a visit to Rome, should recall Liberius. The Emperor planned to have Felix and Liberius rule jointly, but when Liberius returned Felix was forced to retire to Porto, near Rome, where, after making an unsuccessful attempt to establish himself again in Rome, he died on 22 November 365 AD.

This Felix was later confused with a Roman martyr named Felix, with the result that he was included in lists of the Popes as Felix II and that the succeeding Popes of the same name (Pope Felix III and Pope Felix IV) were given wrong numerals, as was Antipope Felix V.

The Catholic Encyclopedia (1909) called this confusion a "distortion of the true facts" and suggested that it arose because the "Liber Pontificalis", which at this point may be registering a reliable tradition, says that this Felix built a church on the Via Aurelia, which is where the Roman martyr of an earlier date was buried. However, a more recent source says that of the martyr Felix nothing is known except his name, that he was a martyr, and that he was buried in the cemetery on the Via Portuensis that bears his name.

The Catholic Encyclopedia remarked that "the real story of the antipope was lost and he obtained in local Roman history the status of a saint and a confessor. As such he appears in the Roman Martyrology on 29 July." At that time (1909) the Roman Martyrology had the following text:

At Rome, on the Aurelian Way, St. Felix II, pope and martyr. Being expelled from his See by the Arian emperor Constantius for defending the Catholic faith, and being put to the sword privately at Cera in Tuscany, he died gloriously. His body was taken away from that place by clerics, and buried on the Aurelian Way. It was afterwards brought to the Church of the Saints Cosmas and Damian, where, under the Sovereign Pontiff Gregory XIII, it was found beneath the altar with the relics of the holy martyrs Mark, Marcellian, and Tranquillinus, and with the latter was put back in the same place on 31 July. In the same altar were also found the bodies of the holy martyrs Abundius, a priest, and Abundantius, a deacon, which were shortly after solemnly transferred to the church of the Society of Jesus, on the eve of their feast.

This entry was based on what the Catholic Encyclopedia called later legends that confound the relative positions of Felix and Liberius. More recent editions of the Roman Martyrology have instead:

At Rome, at the third milestone on the Via Portuensis, in the cemetery dedicated to his name, Saint Felix, martyr.

The feast day of the Roman martyr Felix is 29 July. The antipope Felix died, as stated above, on a 22 November, and his death was not a martyr's, occurring when the Peace of Constantine had been in force for half a century.

As well as the Roman Martyrology, the Roman Missal identified the Saint Felix of 29 July with the antipope. This identification, still found in the 1920 typical edition, does not appear in the 1962 typical edition. To judge by the Marietti printing of 1952, which omits the numeral "II" and the word "Papae", the correction had already been made by then. One Catholic writer excuses this by saying that the antipope "himself did refuse to accept Arianism, and so his feast has been kept in the past on [29 July]".

== See also ==
- Papal selection before 1059
