= Most Precious Blood (disambiguation) =

The Most Precious Blood refers to the Eucharist, a Christian rite.

Most Precious Blood can also refer to:

- Adorers of the Blood of Christ (Latin: Sorores Adoratrices Pretiosissimi Sanguinis, ASC, est. 1834), a Catholic institute of consecrated life for women
- Archconfraternity of the Most Precious Blood (est. 1808)
  - Scapular of the Most Precious Blood
- Feast of the Most Precious Blood, in the General Roman Calendar from 1849 to 1969
- Litany of the Most Precious Blood of Jesus (pub. 1960)
- Missionaries of the Precious Blood (Latin: Congregatio Missionariorum Pretiosissimi Sanguinis, C.PP.S., est. 1815), a Catholic community of priests and brothers
- Precious Blood Hospital (Caritas) (Chinese: 寶血醫院（明愛）, est. 1937), in Hong Kong
- Precious Blood Secondary School (Chinese: 寶血女子中學, est. 1945), a girls' school in Hong Kong
- Precious Blood Secondary School (Riruta) (est. 1964) in Nairobi, Kenya
- Sodality of the Precious Blood, a confraternity of male priests in the Church of England

== Other uses ==
- Most Precious Blood (band), an American band
- Most Precious Blood, a 1998 album by Indecision
- Precious Blood (song) (1990), by American punk rock band the Gits

== See also ==
- Precious Blood Catholic Church (disambiguation)
- Sisters of the Precious Blood (disambiguation)
- Holy Blood (disambiguation)
- Church on Blood (disambiguation)
