= Sisters of the Precious Blood =

Sisters of the Precious Blood may refer to:

- Adorers of the Blood of Christ (Sorores Adoratrices Pretiosissimi Sanguinis, ASC, est. 1834), a Catholic institute of consecrated life for women
- Bernadines of the Precious Blood, a congregation of nuns founded as an offshoot of the reformed Cistercians
- Daughters of the Precious Blood, a congregation of nuns established in the Netherlands in 1862
- Daughters of Charity of the Most Precious Blood, a congregation established in Italy in 1873
- Sisters Adorers of the Precious Blood, a congregation of nuns established in Quebec, Canada, in 1861
- Sisters of the Precious Blood (Baden), a Roman Catholic female religious order founded in Gurtweil, Baden, in 1857
- Sisters of the Precious Blood (Monza), a female religious teaching and social congregation founded in Monza, Italy, in 1874
- Sisters of the Precious Blood (Switzerland), a Roman Catholic female religious order founded in Grisons, Switzerland, in 1834
- Society of the Precious Blood, an Anglican order of Augustinian nuns founded in 1905

== See also ==
- Most Precious Blood (disambiguation)
- Holy Blood (disambiguation)
- Precious Blood Catholic Church (disambiguation)
- Church on Blood (disambiguation)
