= Feast of the Most Precious Blood =

Feast in the General Roman Calendar from 1849 to 1969

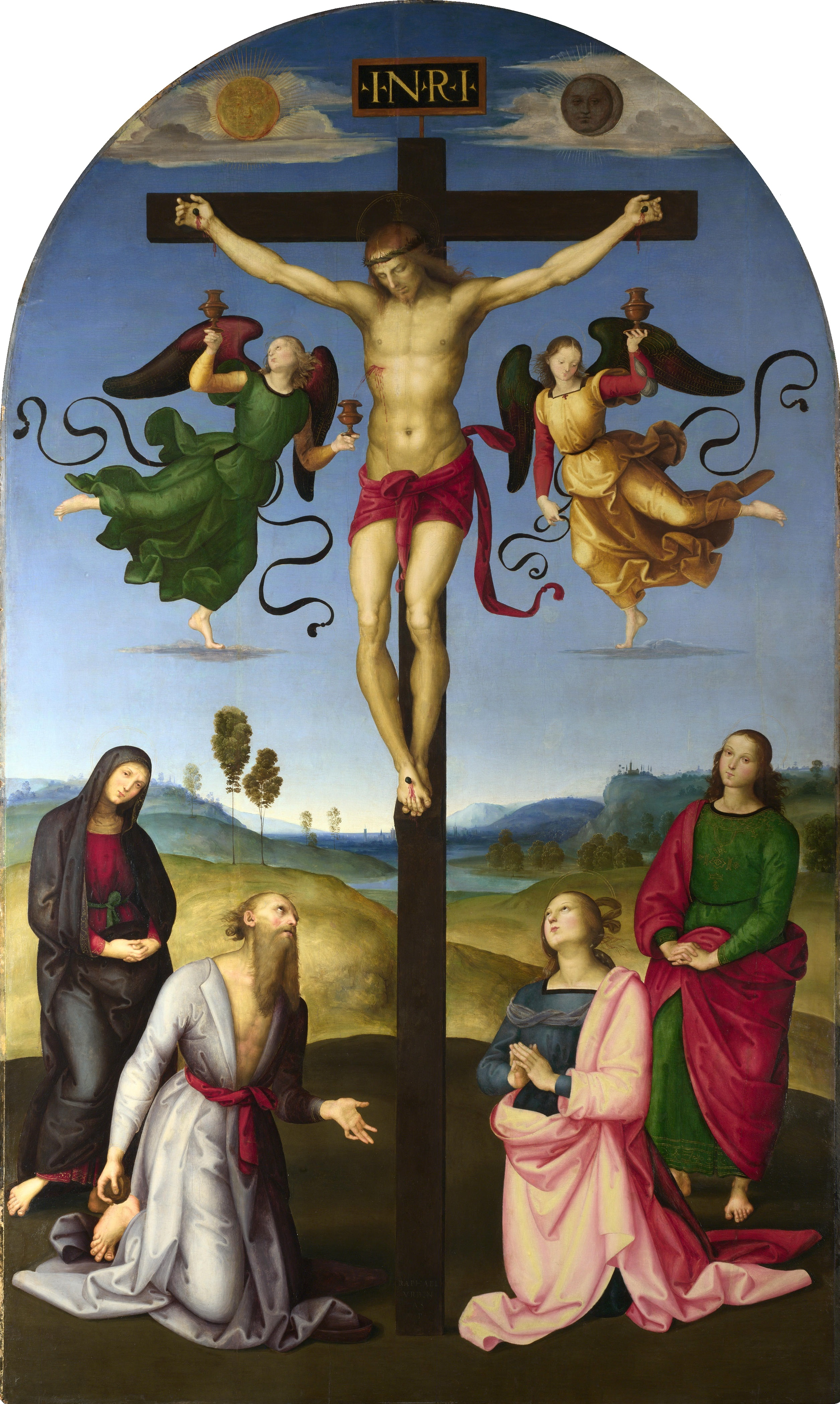
Angels are collecting the Most Precious Blood of Christ at his crucifixion

The Feast of the Most Precious Blood of Our Lord Jesus Christ was in the General Roman Calendar from 1849 to 1969. It was focused on the Blood of Christ and its salvific nature.

== History ==
The feast, celebrated in Spain in the 16th century, was later introduced to Italy by Gaspar del Bufalo.

For many dioceses, there were two days to which the office of the Precious Blood was assigned, the office for both being the same. The reason was that the office was at first granted only to the Fathers of the Most Precious Blood. Later, as one of the offices of the Fridays of Lent, it was assigned to the Friday after the fourth Sunday in Lent (Laetare Sunday) in some dioceses, including, by decision of the Fourth Provincial Council of Baltimore (1840), those in the United States.

When Pope Pius IX went into exile at Gaeta in the Kingdom of the Two Sicilies (1849), he had as his companion Giovanni Merlini, the third superior general of the Fathers of the Most Precious Blood. After they had arrived at Gaeta, Merlini suggested that the pope make a vow to extend the feast of the Precious Blood to the entire church, if he would again recover possession of the Papal States. The pope took the matter into consideration, but a few days later, on 30 June 1849, the day the French army conquered Rome and the insurgents of the Roman Republic capitulated, he sent Joseph Stella to Merlini with the message: "The pope does not deem it expedient to bind himself by a vow; instead His Holiness is pleased to extend the feast immediately to all Christendom."

On 10 August of the same year, Pope Pius officially included the Feast of the Most Precious Blood of Our Lord Jesus Christ in the General Roman Calendar, for celebration on the first Sunday in July, that is the first Sunday after 30 June, which is the anniversary of the liberation of the city of Rome from the insurgents.

In reducing the number of feasts fixed for Sundays, Pope Pius X assigned the date of 1 July to this feast. In 1933, Pope Pius XI raised the feast to the rank of Double of the 1st Class to mark the 1,900th anniversary of Jesus's passion. In Pope John XXIII's 1960 revision of the General Roman Calendar, it was made a Class I Feast (see General Roman Calendar of 1960).

The feast was removed from the General Roman calendar in 1969, "because the Most Precious Blood of Christ the Redeemer is already venerated in the solemnities of the Passion, of Corpus Christi, of the Sacred Heart of Jesus, and in the feast of the Exaltation of the Holy Cross. But the Mass of the Most Precious Blood of Our Lord Jesus Christ is placed among the Votive Masses".

The feast nonetheless continues to be celebrated as a solemnity in calendars of some religious orders such as the Missionaries of the Precious Blood, the Congregation of the Passion of Jesus Christ, and the Adorers of the Blood of Christ. Furthermore, it is celebrated by parishes and communities that observe the 1962 Calendar. The whole month of July is still kept dedicated to the Most Precious Blood.

== Significance ==
In Catholic belief, the Blood of Christ is precious because it is Christ's own great ransom paid for the redemption of mankind. In this belief, as there was to be no remission of sin without the shedding of blood, the "Incarnate Word" not only offered his life for the salvation of the world, but he offered to give up his life by a bloody death, and to hang bloodless, soulless and dead upon the Cross for the salvation of humanity. Jesus is said to have given his life – his blood – for the sake of all humanity, atoning for every form of human sin. The devotion to the Most Precious Blood is thus understood to be a call to repentance and reparation.

== Liturgy ==
The collect for the Votive Mass of the Precious Blood is as follows:

"O God, who by the Precious Blood of your Only Begotten Son have redeemed the whole world, preserve in us the work of your mercy, so that ever honouring the mystery of our salvation, we may merit to obtain its fruits. Through Our Lord …

The readings are taken from Exodus 24, 3–8 and John 19, 31–37 (the Descent from the Cross). The hymn at Lauds is the Salvete Christi Vulnera ("Hail, Ye Wounds of Christ") which is dated to at least 1798.
