= Holy Blood (disambiguation) =

Holy Blood is an alternative term for the Blood of Christ and may refer to:

- Relic of the Holy Blood, any of several relics claiming to be the blood of Christ
- Basilica of the Holy Blood, a church in Bruges
- Heiligenblut am Großglockner, a municipality in Austria
- Holy Blood (band), a Ukrainian Christian black / folk metal band
- Holy Blood of Wilsnack, a pilgrim site in Germany
- Procession of the Holy Blood, a procession in Bruges
- Santa Sangre, a film by Alejandro Jodorowsky
- The Holy Blood and the Holy Grail, a book by Michael Baigent, Richard Leigh, and Henry Lincoln

== See also ==
- Most Precious Blood (disambiguation)
- Precious Blood Catholic Church (disambiguation)
- Sisters of the Precious Blood (disambiguation)
- Church on Blood (disambiguation)
