= Giovanni Merlini =

Italian Roman Catholic priest (1795–1873)

Blessed Giovanni Merlini C.PP.S.
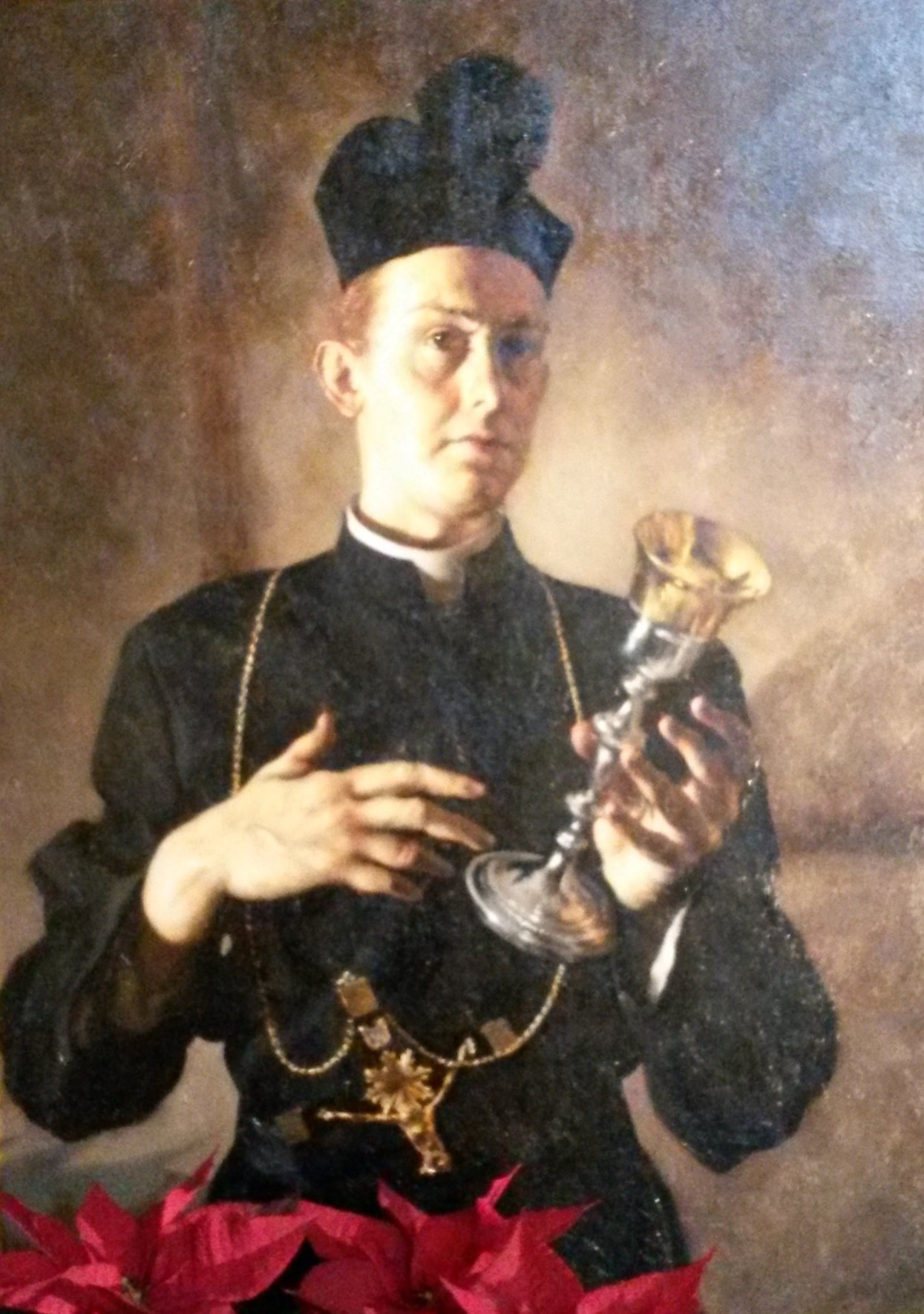

Priest
- Born: 28 August 1795; Spoleto, Perugia, Papal States
- Died: 12 January 1873 (aged 77); Rome, Kingdom of Italy
- Resting place: Santa Maria in Trivio, Rome, Italy
- Venerated in: Roman Catholic Church
- Beatified: 12 January 2025, Archbasilica of Saint John Lateran, Rome, Italy by Cardinal Marcello Semeraro
- Feast: 12 January
- Attributes: Priest's habit

Giovanni Merlini (28 August 1795 – 12 January 1873) was an Italian Roman Catholic priest and a professed member in the Missionaries of the Precious Blood. Merlini was a close friend of Saint Gaspare del Bufalo who founded the order and was also a close friend to Pope Pius IX who provided assistance in helping the order spread for its activities. He also served as the third Moderator General for the order from 1847 until his death. He was also a noted spiritual director and provided spiritual counsel to Saint Maria de Mattias as she went establishing a religious congregation of her own.

The beatification process for Merlini opened in the 1880s in Rome and took several decades to complete. In 1973, he was named Venerable after Pope Paul VI confirmed that the late priest had practised heroic virtue during his lifetime. Giovanni Merlini was beatified in Rome on Sunday, 12 January 2025.

== Life ==
Giovanni Merlini was born in Spoleto on 28 August 1795 as the third of thirteen children to Luigi Merlini and Antonia Claudi. His father - who settled in Spoleto - was descended from a noble Sicilian line but set up a business in Spoleto. He attended school in his hometown, where he was noted for his pious temperament, and he received his First Communion in 1808 in the Sant'Ansano church from the Barnabite Bishop (and future cardinal) Antonio Maria Cadolini.

He decided to pursue the priesthood despite his parents making their objections known to him and commenced his studies for the priesthood in 1809 in Spoleto. He received his sacerdotal ordination on 19 December 1818 in his hometown from Bishop Francesco Canali (future cardinal). Merlini learnt from his schoolmate and friend Fr. Antonio Lipparelli that Saint Gaspare del Bufalo would be in the area conducting a retreat. The two decided to join the retreat. Merlini enrolled on 6 July 1820 in a course for the Spiritual Exercises that Saint Gaspare del Bufalo was conducting in the San Felice convent in Giano dell'Umbria. It was here that he became acquainted with the priest, with the two becoming close friends and confidants. In 1820, he became part of the Missionaries of the Precious Blood that del Bufalo had founded in 1815. The two would encounter initial difficulties in the role of their order, with the most resistance coming from Pope Leo XII and his two successors, who disliked the premise of their order.

Merlini became a noted spiritual director and provided spiritual counsel to Saint Maria de Mattias, whom he aided in founding her religious congregation titled the Sisters Adorers of the Most Precious Blood. He also provided spiritual counsel to the convert (and mother of the Russian ambassador to Naples) Princess Adelaide Wolkonska. Merlini aided his friend del Bufalo at his deathbed in 1837. Part of his role in the order included preaching in several Italian cities - such as in L'Aquila in 1826 - in addition to overseeing the formation of the newer members in the order.

He also became a close friend and confidant to Pope Pius IX (who once served as the Archbishop of Spoleto). He joined the pope during the latter's exile to Gaeta after losing the Papal States to the Roman Republic and asked the pope to extend the Feast of the Precious Blood to the entire church in 1849. Merlini made this request not long after their arrival in Gaeta and had suggested to the pope that he do this if he ever regained possession of the Papal States. Pius IX gave the matter consideration, but then on 30 June 1849, the French took Rome and returned the Papal States to the pope upon the Roman Republic's capitulation. Merlini learnt in correspondence that the pope would assent to his request which he saw to on 10 August 1849 in which the pope applied the feast to the General Roman Calendar. Pius IX was also a benefactor to the order and helped them set up houses in Alsace and Bavaria while aiding in establishing the order's motherhouse in a convent adjacent to the Santa Maria in Trivio church in Rome.

Merlini succeeded Fr. Biagio Valentini as the order's third Moderator General on 28 December 1847 after having served as the interim leader since 26 August due to Valentini's declining health. His tenure saw the order expand into the United States of America.

Merlini died in 1873 after he sustained injuries in a traffic collision in Rome near the Santa Maria in Trivio church. The last thing he did before he died was to forgive the coachman who had run into him. His remains were interred in Campo Verano but later exhumed and relocated in March 1946 to the Santa Maria in Trivio church next to his friend Gaspare del Bufalo. Fr. Enrico Rizzoli succeeded him as the order's fourth Moderator General.

== Beatification process ==
The beatification process for Merlini commenced in Rome in 1880 in an informative process that concluded later in 1883. Merlini's writings were approved by theologians on 23 December 1914. The formal introduction to the cause came under Pope Pius XI on 25 June 1927, granting Merlini the title of Servant of God. The Congregation for Rites later validated the informative process and an apostolic process on 28 June 1957 in Rome. The cause remained inactive until 7 July 1971, when the Congregation for the Causes of Saints and their consultants approved the cause, as did the C.C.S. members alone on 9 May 1972.

Merlini became titled as Venerable on 10 May 1973 after Pope Paul VI confirmed that the late priest had lived a model life and had practised heroic virtue to a favourable degree during his lifetime.

Merlini's beatification depends upon the papal confirmation of a miracle attributed to his intercession, which is in most cases a healing that neither science nor medicine can explain. The diocesan process to investigate one such case opened in the Naples archdiocese (which Cardinal Crescenzio Sepe inaugurated) on 6 February 2019.

On 23 May 2024, Pope Francis, after meeting with Prefect Marcello Semeraro of Dicastery for the Causes of Saints, recognized a miracle attributed to the intercession of Merlini. The Holy Father issued a Decree convening a Consistory of Cardinals to deliberate his beatification. Since then, the Vatican has announced his beatification would take place at St. John Lateran on Sunday, 12 January 2025.

== See also ==
- Feast of the Most Precious Blood
