= Archconfraternity of the Most Precious Blood =

The Archconfraternity of the Most Precious Blood was founded by Francesco Albertini, canon of the Basilica di San Nicola in Carcere, Rome, in 1808.

== Background ==
Confraternities in honor of the Blood of Christ first arose in Spain. In the life of the Carmelite lay brother Francis of the Infant Jesus (d. 1601), mention is made of such a confraternity as existing in Valencia. It was said of the Carmelite Anna of St. Augustine (d. 1624), that "she received with hospitality those who went about collecting alms for the confraternities of the Precious Blood erected in many places".

Ravenna, Italy, possessed one at an early date. Another was erected in Rome under Pope Gregory XIII and confirmed by Pope Sixtus V, but merged later on with the Archconfraternity of the Gonfalone.

== History ==
The association was founded by Francesco Albertini, canon of the Basilica di San Nicola in Carcere, Rome, where since 1708 devotions in honour of the Precious Blood had been held. Albertini conceived of a sodality,

To promote the greater glory of God, the devotion and frequent reception of the sacraments among the people, especially in the poor artisans, workers, and peasants, and to obtain a more abundant suffrage for the souls of the deceased, particularly of those who died in the inns and in those places where they are ordinarily most forgotten.

The “Pious Association in Honour of the Most Precious Blood” was established on 8 December 1808. Gaspar del Bufalo, of Santa Maria in Vincis, was a close associate of Albertini and preached the sermon at the opening Mass. Some months later Albertini composed the "Chaplet of the Precious Blood".

The confraternity was canonically erected by Pope Pius VII through his cardinal vicar, 27 February 1809. After the deportation of Pope Pius VII in 1809, Albertini and del Bufalo refused to take the oath of allegiance to Napoleon Bonaparte, and were sent into exile to northern Italy where they were imprisoned for four years. Albertini was then deported to Corsica.

After the defeat of Napoleon, Albertini and del Bufalo each returned Rome. Pope Pius VII was troubled by the spiritual situation in Rome after he returned from exile and decided that missions should be established throughout the Papal States. In 1814, he selected del Bufalo and some other priests to undertake the responsibility, assigning them to the abbey of San Felice at Giano dell'Umbria, in the Umbria region of Italy. On 15 August 1815, Gaspar del Bufalo founded the Missionaries of the Precious Blood, a Society of Apostolic Life composed of secular priests and brothers who live in community.

The confraternity was raised to the rank of an archconfraternity, 26 September 1815, and enriched with numerous indulgences. Albertini was appointed his successor as Bishop of the Diocese of Terracina, Priverno e Sezze in March 1819, but died of malaria in November at the age of 49.

Confraternities had been introduced into America by the Passionists, and canonically erected in the numerous houses and parishes founded by them after their arrival (1844).

In England it was erected in the church of St. Wilfrid, Staffordshire, 1847 by Frederick William Faber, but was in August 1850 it was transferred to the London Oratory, where it continues to meet weekly in the chapel of Our Lady of Dolours.

Today the former archconfraternity is known as Sanguis Christi Union, being an international association of the faithful of Pontifical Right.

== See also ==
- Scapular of the Most Precious Blood
