= Newman University (Kansas) =

Catholic university in Wichita, Kansas, U.S.

- Former names: Sacred Heart College (1933–1973); Kansas Newman College (1973–1998)
- Motto: Caritas Christi urget nos (Latin)
- Motto in English: The charity of Christ urges us
- Type: Private university
- Established: 1933; 93 years ago
- Founder: Adorers of the Blood of Christ
- Religious affiliation: Roman Catholic (Adorers of the Blood of Christ)
- President: Kathleen S. Jagger
- Dean: Lori Steiner
- Academic staff: 207
- Students: 2,787 (fall 2023)
- Undergraduates: 2,398 (fall 2023)
- Postgraduates: 389 (fall 2023)
- Location: Wichita, Kansas, U.S. 37°40′20″N 97°22′42″W
- Campus: Urban 61 acres (250,000 m^{2})
- Colors: Navy and red
- Nickname: Jets
- Sporting affiliations: NCAA Division II – The MIAA
- Mascot: Johnny Jet
- Website: newmanu.edu

Newman University is a private Catholic university in Wichita, Kansas, United States. It is named for John Henry Newman and was founded by the Adorers of the Blood of Christ in 1933.

== History ==
Naming history
Years	Name
1933–1950	Sacred Heart Junior College
1950–1973	Sacred Heart College
1973–1998	Kansas Newman College
1998–present	Newman University

The college was founded in 1933 by the Adorers of the Blood of Christ as Sacred Heart Junior College. Courses were offered for women only, initially leading to degrees in home economics, nursing, teaching, and secretarial science. In 1950, the college becomes a four-year institution and renamed to Sacred Heart College. The college added more facilities and courses during the 1950s and began accepting male students on a limited basis in 1958 in evenings and summer. The school became fully coeducational in 1965 and was accredited by the North Central Association of Colleges and Secondary schools in 1967. The name of the school was changed to Kansas Newman College in 1973 and to Newman University in 1998. The school is named in honor of Saint John Henry Newman.

=== Presidents ===
President	Institution name	Years of tenure
Kathleen S. Jagger	Newman University	2020–present
Noreen M. Carrocci	Newman University	2007–2019
Aidan O. Dunleavy	Newman University	2000–2006
Tarcisia Roths	Kansas Newman College, Newman University	1991–2000
Timothy Duszynski	Kansas Newman College	1989–1990
Robert J. Giroux	Kansas Newman College	1982–1989
Rev. Roman S. Galiardi	Sacred Heart College, Kansas Newman College	1971–1982
Sylvia Gorges	Sacred Heart College	1961–1971
Mary Hilary Yoggerst	Sacred Heart College	1954–1961
Rev. Edward P. McCarthy	Sacred Heart College	1950–1954
Rev. Charles A. Smith	Sacred Heart Junior College	1946–1950
Rev. Leon A. McNeill	Sacred Heart Junior College	1933–1946

== Campus ==
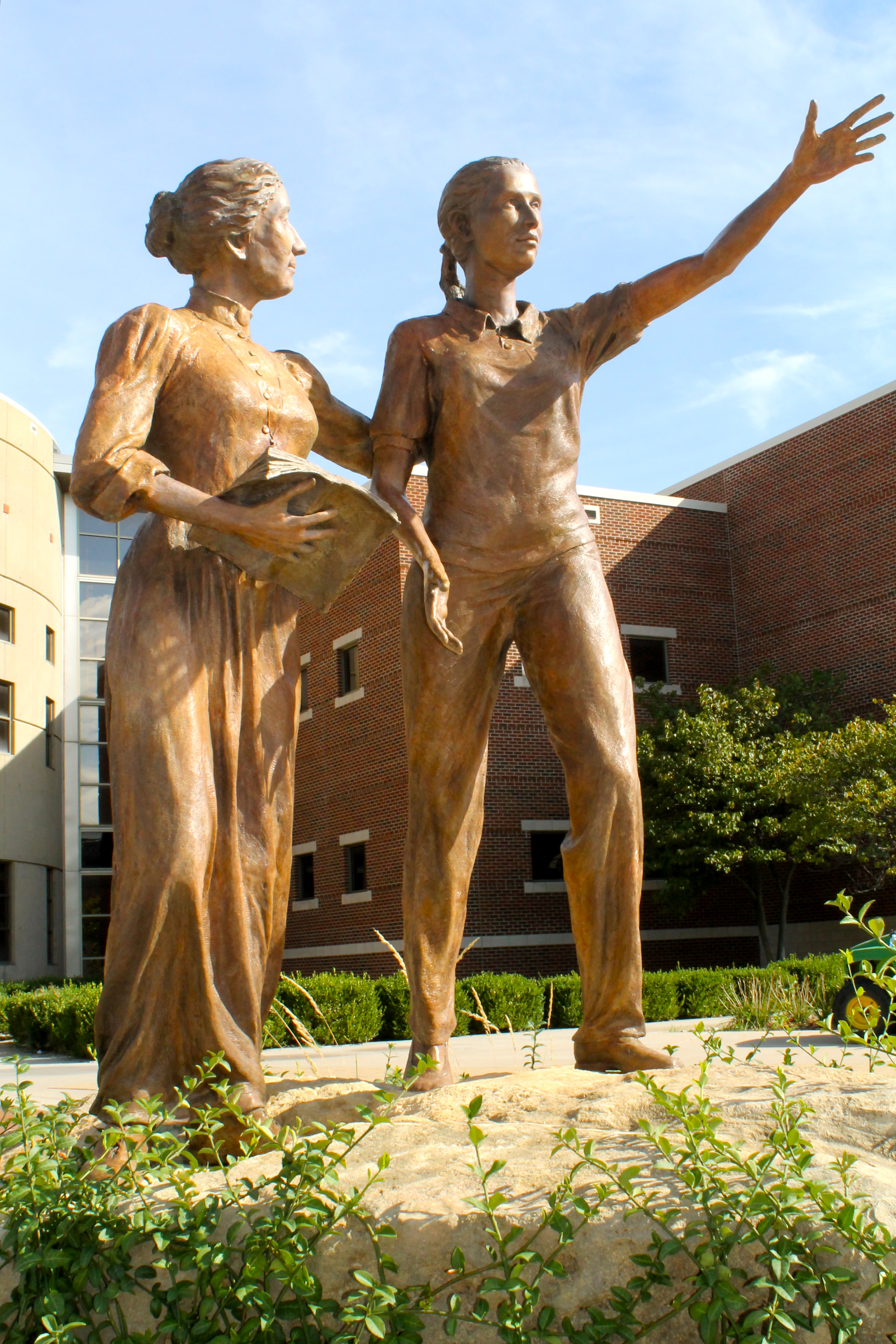
St. Maria De Mattias Statue (2013)

The main buildings of Newman University are all dedicated to someone important in Newman's history.

The Fine Arts Center is named after Maria De Mattias, the founder of the Adorers of the Blood of Christ. Maria taught herself to write and subsequently taught those from her local area who could not afford an education. Other figures from the history of the university have also had buildings named after them at Newman, such as Monsignor Leon A. McNeill, who was the first president of Newman as a college.

In 2010 Newman University began construction on the Bishop Gerber Science Center which now houses state-of-the-art science labs and classrooms. The project was completed in 2017.

The Gymnasium is named after the O'Shaughnessy family which has made generous donations towards Newman and were the lead donors for the athletic department. The family also supports scholarships and other buildings around campus such as De Mattias Fine Arts Hall.

The Dugan Library and conference center was named after John E. and Marilyn K. Dugan of Wichita for their donation of $2 million after the previous library was demolished.

Name of Building	Function Of Building
Sacred Heart	Administration, Campus Ministry, Financial Aid Services, Human Resources, Learning Center, St. John's Chapel, Classrooms, and Computer Lab
Dugan Library and Student Center	Alumni Center, Library, Computers, Student Center
Eck Hall	Classrooms, Nursing Department
Bishop Gerber Science Center	Sciences and Lab classrooms
McNeill Hall	Professors Offices
Mabee Dining Center	Breakfast, Lunch, Dinner
De Mattias Fine Arts Center	Black Box Theater, Performance Hall, Steckline Gallery, Gorges Atruim, and Classrooms
O'Shaughnessy Hall	Gymnasium

== Student life ==
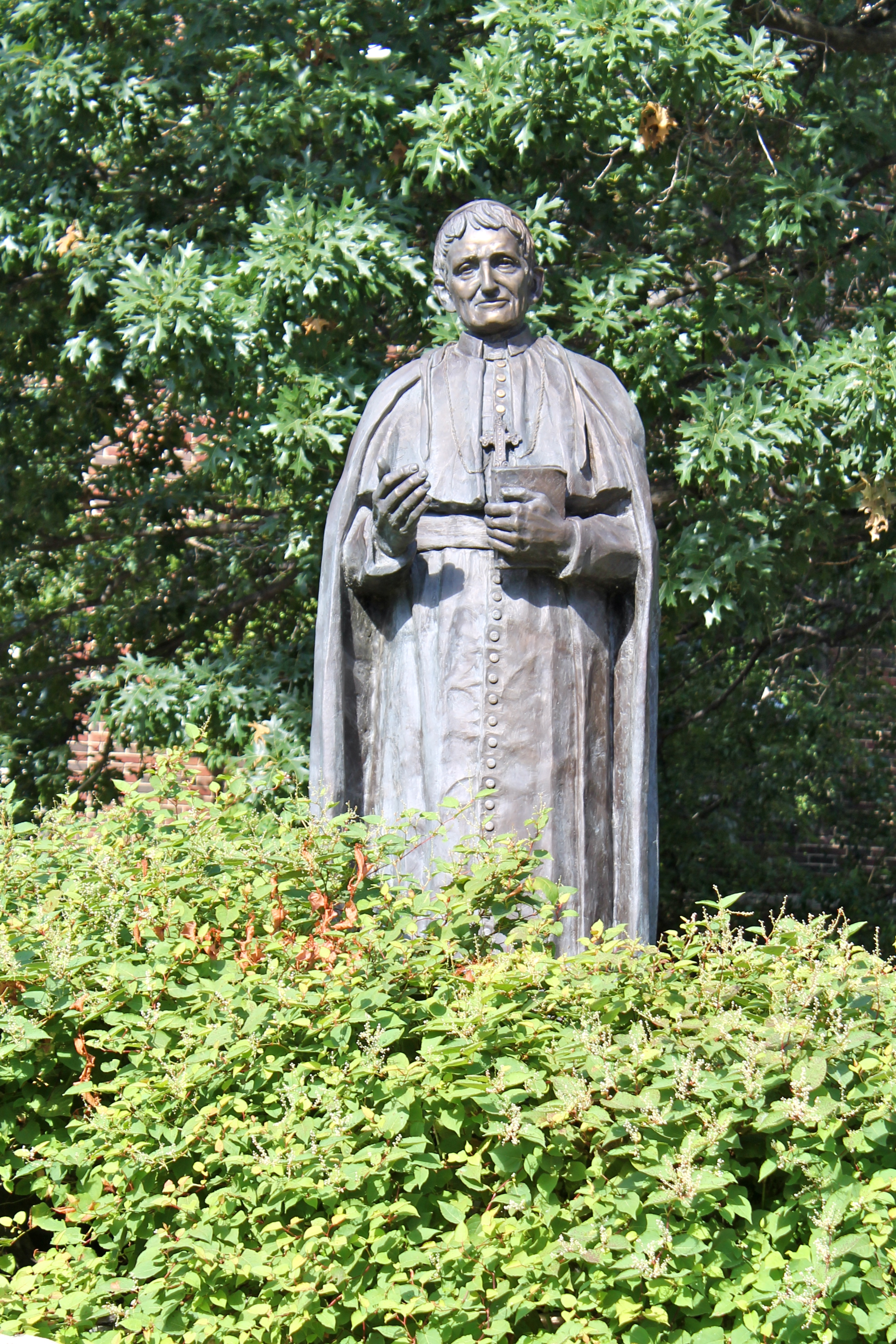
John Henry Saint Newman Statue (2013)

=== Admissions ambassadors ===
These students dedicate their time to touring campus with potential students. Those who visit to learn more about the university will interact with ambassadors for a large portion of their visit.

=== Clubs and organizations ===
Newman University has more than 30 active clubs and organizations ranging from The Multicultural Leadership Organization to a Disc Golf Club. Many students are inducted into nationally recognized academic organizations such as Pi Gamma Mu.

These communities provide opportunities for students to develop their leadership, promote awareness of issues, expand professional and personal competencies, and engage with Newman University and local communities outside of the classroom.

=== Resident assistant ===
Resident Assistants (RAs) are individuals who make sure that students living in the residence halls are abiding by the rules of Newman University. RAs also make sure to interact with their residents and organize events throughout the year to help strengthen the residence hall community. The residence halls are listed below:

- Carrocci Hall
- Beata Hall
- Merlini Hall
- Fugate Hall

=== Student government association ===
The Student Government Association (SGA) represents the whole student population at Newman University. Their main focus is to find ways in which to better the experience of students while they attend Newman University.

=== Campus Ministry ===
Campus Ministry hosts faith-based events throughout the year with the help of campus ministers and student volunteers. Along with a daily Mass, the organization hosts events such as bible studies, liturgical lunches, game nights, and service trips.

=== Service scholars ===
Many of the scholarships awarded at Newman have an annual community service requirement. The three main scholarships awarded with these requirements are ASC Community Leader, Saint Newman, and the Presidential Scholarship.

==== Scholarships ====
At Newman, the Saint Newman Scholarship is the highest academic award offered. The requirements include: 4.0 high school GPA, 30+ ACT, 64 community service hours annually, and 3.4 cumulative GPA while at Newman.

The Presidential Scholarship is $12,000 annually and awarded for high academic achievement. The requirements include: 3.8-3.9 high school GPA, 28-29 ACT, 64 community service hours annually, and must maintain 3.25 cumulative GPA while at Newman.

The ASC Community Leader Scholarship is working to keep the mission of Newman and the mission of the founders, the Adorers of the Blood of Christ, strong in the Newman community. ASC scholars participate in service and leadership classes as well as complete 90 hours of community service. The requirements include: 3.0 high school GPA, outstanding community service, interview, 90 hours community service annually, 4 years of service classes. Seniors are required to organize a Capstone project that consist of 45 hours (from the 90 hours) of community service.

== Athletics ==
The Newman athletic teams are called the Jets. The university is a member of the Division II level of the National Collegiate Athletic Association (NCAA), primarily competing in the Mid-America Intercollegiate Athletics Association (MIAA) for most of its sports as an associate member since the 2019–20 academic year (before achieving full member status in 2022–23); while its men's soccer team competes in the Great American Conference (GAC). The Jets previously competed in the D-II Heartland Conference from 2006–07 to 2018–19; and in the defunct Midlands Collegiate Athletic Conference (MCAC) of the National Association of Intercollegiate Athletics (NAIA) from 1999–2000 to 2005–06.

Newman competes in 19 intercollegiate varsity sports: Men's sports include baseball, basketball, bowling, cross country, golf, soccer, tennis, triathlon and wrestling; while women's sports include basketball, bowling, cheer & dance, cross country, golf, soccer, softball, tennis, triathlon and volleyball.

=== Mascot ===
Newman University introduced their new mascot, "Johnny Jet", in September 2010.

== Notable people ==
=== Alumni ===
- Dax (1994- ), rapper
- Alex Ciabattoni (1994- ), basketball forward
- Tony Fulton (1972- ), Nebraska state legislator
- Issoufou Idrissa (1976- ), Nigerien soccer striker
- Tom Malone (1953- ), Kansas Court of Appeals judge
- Karen Muenster (1942- ), Minority Whip in the South Dakota Senate
- Rick Roder, baseball umpire, author
- Clare Vanderpool (1965- ), children's book author
- Ponka-We Victors (1981- ), Kansas state legislator

=== Faculty and staff ===
- Robert Beattie, lawyer, crime writer
- Cliff Brown (1956- ), soccer coach
- Naomi Hirahara (1962- ), novelist, editor
