= Maria De Mattias =

Italian Roman Catholic saint (1805–1866)

Saint Maria Matilda De Mattias A.S.C.
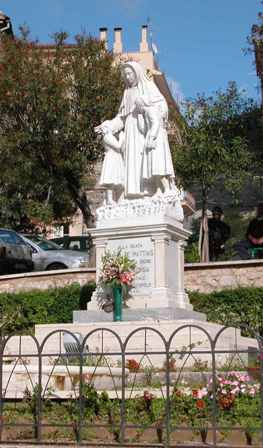
- Born: February 4, 1805; Vallecorsa, Province of Frosinone, Italy
- Died: August 20, 1866 (aged 61); Rome, Italy
- Venerated in: Roman Catholic Church
- Beatified: 1 October 1950 by Pope Pius XII
- Canonized: 18 May 2003 by Pope John Paul II
- Major shrine: Chapel of the Precious Blood, General Motherhouse of the Sisters Adorers, Rome, Italy
- Feast: 4 February
- Attributes: Foundress

Maria Matilda De Mattias (February 4, 1805 – August 20, 1866) was an Italian woman who founded the religious congregation of the Sisters Adorers of the Blood of Christ. She is a saint in the Catholic Church, having been canonized by Pope John Paul II in 2003.

== Background ==
Maria was born into a period of constant political turmoil. The civil life of Vallecorsa was marred by the feuding of a number of competing factions. The small kingdoms and republics on the Italian peninsula were constantly at war with one another. Commerce was disrupted; in the face of economic uncertainty and lack of steady work, young men who found it easier to live by banditry joined those who were outlaws for political reasons, holed up in mountain enclaves. They lived by raiding and intimidating the peasants and villagers. Gang leaders became popular and romantic figures.

== Biography ==
=== Early years ===
De Mattias was born 4 February 1805 in Vallecorsa, in the Province of Frosinone, Italy, to a religious and upper-class family which valued education. She was the second of four children of Giovanni de Mattias and Ottavia de Angelis. Because her family had property and wealth, it was not safe for Maria and her brothers to play outside—the bandits made a practice of kidnapping children for ransom. Although women during her time did not normally receive a formal education, she was able to teach herself how to read and write. In her mid-teens, she was withdrawn and focused more on her looks than religion. She was proud of her long blond hair, and spent hours before her mirror, posing and arranging her clothes. However, at the age of 16 she was inspired by a mystical vision and began to break out from her sheltered upbringing.

=== Religious life ===
In 1822 Gaspar del Bufalo, founder of the Missionaries of the Precious Blood, preached a mission in her town. De Mattias decided that she would devote her life to caring for the needy and spreading the word of God. Through the preaching of del Bufalo on devotion to the Precious Blood of Jesus, Maria De Mattias was drawn to see this mystery of Christ's life as a model for self-sacrifice. On March 4, 1834, at the age of 29, under the guidance of del Bufalo's successor, Giovanni Merlini, she founded the Congregation of the Sisters Adorers of the Blood of Christ to advance this service. She had been called by the administrator of Anagni, Bishop Giuseppe Maria Lais, to teach the young girls—she had learned to read and write on her own.

The religious order was founded as an apostolic order, an active teaching order, rather than a monastic order. In 1855 the young order received papal approval. Maria De Mattias made a public vow of chastity, receiving a gold heart imprinted with three drops of blood. The symbol was given to her by John Merlini, her spiritual director who later served as superior general of the Precious Blood Missionaries. A silver heart is still worn by the sisters around the globe.

De Mattias spent over 30 years travelling throughout Italy to help establish communities of her Sisters. This involved treks ranging from walking long distances to taking treacherous journeys on donkeys. She was so eager to proclaim the mystery of Jesus' redemptive love shown through his shedding of his Precious Blood that she would preach in towns wherever she went.

Her communities were often very poor, sometimes not even having food in their cupboards, but they were always willing to share whatever they had with the poor among whom they lived. During her lifetime, the Congregation established over 70 communities throughout Europe.

De Mattias died in Rome on August 20, 1866 and was buried in Rome's Campo Verano Cemetery, in a tomb donated by Pope Pius IX.

== Veneration ==
On 28 June 1896, the required waiting period after De Mattias's death at that time, the process for her canonization was begun at the request of Caterina Pavoni, her successor as Superior General of the congregation then.

She was beatified October 1, 1950 by Pope Pius XII, at which time her remains were transferred to the chapel of the Precious Blood at the Congregation's general motherhouse in Rome. She was canonized on May 18, 2003, by Pope John Paul II.

== Feast day ==
Normally the feast of a saint is on the day of his or her death, but this is not always the case. For Maria de Mattias, the feast is celebrated on February 4, her birthday.

== Legacy ==
Today the almost 2,000 Sisters of the Congregation continue the work of their foundress around the world. In addition to Italy, communities are also established in Bolivia, Brazil, China, Guatemala, Liberia, South Korea the United States, and Vietnam. In October 1992, five Sisters Adorers from the United States were murdered during a civil war then raging in Liberia.
