= Church on Blood =

In the Russian Orthodox tradition, Church on Blood (храм на крови) is a church commemorating the spot of a murder. There are four such churches:

- Church of St. Demetrius on Blood in Uglich (17th century) – commemorates the murder of Tsarevich Demetrius
- Church of the Savior on Blood in St. Petersburg (19th century) – commemorates the murder of Alexander II of Russia
- Church of All Saints, Yekaterinburg (21st century) – commemorates the murder of Nicholas II of Russia and his family
- Church of the New Martyrs and Confessors of the Russian Orthodox Church a.k.a. Lubyanka Church on Blood (21st century) – commemorates the Gulag victims. It stands next to the infamous Lubyanka Building on the grounds of the Sretensky Monastery

== See also ==
- Holy Blood (disambiguation)
- Most Precious Blood (disambiguation)
- Precious Blood Catholic Church (disambiguation)
- Sisters of the Precious Blood (disambiguation)
