= Chris Jaksa =

American emergency physician and baseball umpire

Chris Jaksa is an emergency physician and former professional baseball umpire. Along with fellow umpire instructor Rick Roder, Jaksa co-authored the only complete re-write of baseball's professional rules; this work is commonly known as the "Jaksa/Roder Manual."

== Umpiring career ==
Jaksa put his studies on hold at the University of Michigan and attended the Joe Brinkman Umpire School in 1984. Upon graduation from the program, he entered professional baseball and umpired in the Appalachian League (1984), Midwest League (1985-1987), Carolina League (1988), and Southern League (1989). He was the head rules instructor at the Brinkman school from 1987 to 1989. In Jaksa's last season as an umpire, he appeared in an ESPN documentary on minor league umpires.

== After baseball ==
After six seasons of umpiring minor league baseball, Jaksa went back to college at Michigan, earning a philosophy degree in 1993 and a medical degree in 1997. He completed an emergency medicine residency at SUNY Buffalo and practices in the emergency room at Modesto and Manteca Kaiser Permanente in California.
