= Patricia of Naples =

Italian Catholic saint

Saint Patricia of Naples
- Born: seventh century Constantinople (modern-day Istanbul, Turkey)
- Died: ~665 AD; Naples, Italy
- Venerated in: Catholic Church; Eastern Orthodox Church
- Feast: August 25
- Patronage: Naples (co-patron)

Patricia of Naples (or Patricia of Constantinople) (Italian: Santa Patrizia) (died ca. 665 AD) is an Italian virgin and saint. Tradition states that she was noble; she may have been related to the Roman Emperor. Some sources say that she was a descendant of Constantine the Great. The particulars traditional about her are unreliable and in some instances contradictory.

Wishing to escape a marriage arranged by Constans II and become a nun, she went to Rome. There she received the veil from Pope Liberius. Upon the death of her father, she returned to Constantinople and, renouncing any claim to the imperial crown, distributed her wealth to the poor. She then planned to go on pilgrimage to Jerusalem.

However, a terrible storm shipwrecked her on the shores of Naples. Finding refuge on the tiny island of Megarides (the site of the present-day Castel dell'Ovo), the site of a small hermitage, Patricia died shortly after from disease.

== Venerations ==
The monastery of Sante Patricia contained her relics. During the turbulent events of 1864 [what events?], they were translated to the monastery of San Gregorio Armeno. Covered in wax, her relics were contained in an urn of gold, gems, and silver, and were placed in the monastery's chapel. The monastery also preserves her blood. Her blood, like that of Januarius, the other, more famous patron saint of Naples, is also said to liquefy periodically. The associated legend states that after Patricia died, a zealous man pulled out one of her teeth, causing the body to hemorrhage. Patricia's followers collected the blood and exposed it. It then liquefied.
