= Rick Roder =

Rick Roder is an author, editor, consultant, and educator specializing in baseball rules and umpiring. He attended the Joe Brinkman Umpire School in 1987 and was a professional umpire from 1987 to 1996. His umpiring experience included the Pioneer League (1987), Midwest League (1988-1989), Texas League (1990 and 1992), Southern League (1991), Pacific Coast League (1993), International League (1994), and American Association (1995-1996). He was the head rules instructor at the Brinkman school from 1990 to 1995 and co-authored the only complete re-write of baseball's professional rules (commonly known as the "Jaksa/Roder Manual") with fellow instructor Chris Jaksa. Roder has authored three other books on rules and umpiring. He is also the author of Frontiers of Faith: A History of the Diocese of Sioux City and We Are Called: A History of St. Mary's Parish, Remsen, Iowa.

Roder is a graduate of Newman University (formerly Kansas Newman College) in Wichita, KS, where he was a pitcher for the Jet's baseball team.
