= Salvete Christi Vulnera =

Salvete Christi Vulnera is the Office hymn at Lauds of the feast of the Most Precious Blood in the Traditional Roman Breviary. Translated from Latin, "Salvete Christi Vulnera" means "Hail, wounds of Christ."
