= Relic of the Holy Blood =

There have been many relics claiming to be or contain the Holy Blood, that is, the blood of Christ.

The following churches claim or claimed to have such a relic:

- Basilica of the Holy Blood, Bruges
- Basilica di Sant'Andrea di Mantova, Mantua
- Fécamp Abbey
- Reichenau Abbey – see Translatio sanguinis Domini
- Sainte-Chapelle, Paris
- St. James's Church, Rothenburg ob der Tauber
- Weingarten Abbey

The following relics contain what is claimed to be the blood of Christ:

- Sudarium of Oviedo
- Shroud of Turin
- Westminster blood relic

== See also ==
- Liquefying blood relics
- Relics associated with Jesus
