= Liquefying blood relics =

Christian relics reported to undergo periodic liquefaction

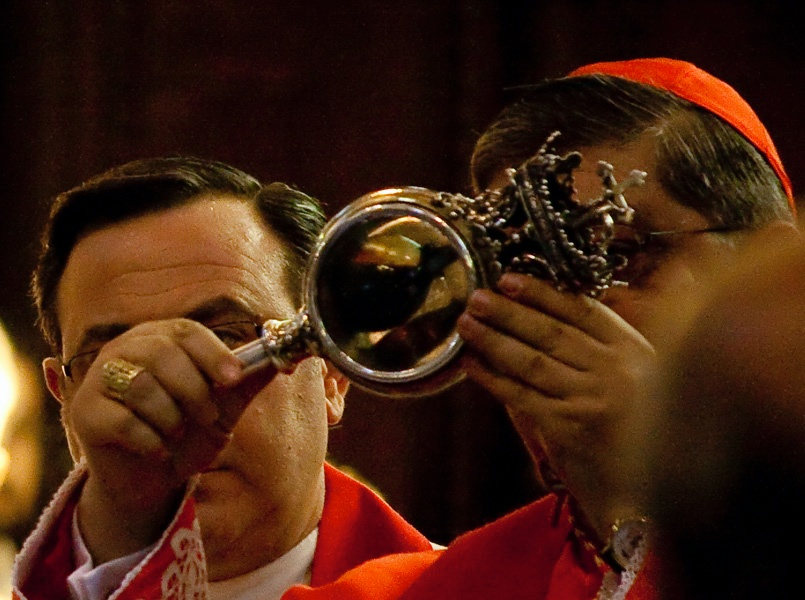
- Cardinal Crescenzio Sepe during the rite of the liquefaction of the blood of Januarius.

Information
- Type: Miracle
- Denomination: Catholic

Location
- Country: Italy

Liquefying blood relics are Christian relics, primarily in Campania, Italy, that are reported to undergo periodic transitions from an apparently solid state to a liquid state during religious observances or on particular feast days. An example is the relic traditionally identified as the blood of Januarius in Naples, similar phenomena have been reported for relics associated with Patricia of Naples, Pantaleon, and Lawrence of Rome.

In Italy, there are around 190 claimed blood vial relics of saints that are venerated, particularly clustered around Naples, though only a small minority undergo periodic state changes.

== Overview ==
Locations of liquefying blood relics

Reports of liquefying blood relics are concentrated in southern Italy, especially in Campania. The phenomenon has attracted attention from religious authorities, historians, and chemists. Scholarly discussions have examined both the devotional significance of the relics and possible natural explanations for the reported liquefactions.

== Major relics ==
=== Januarius ===
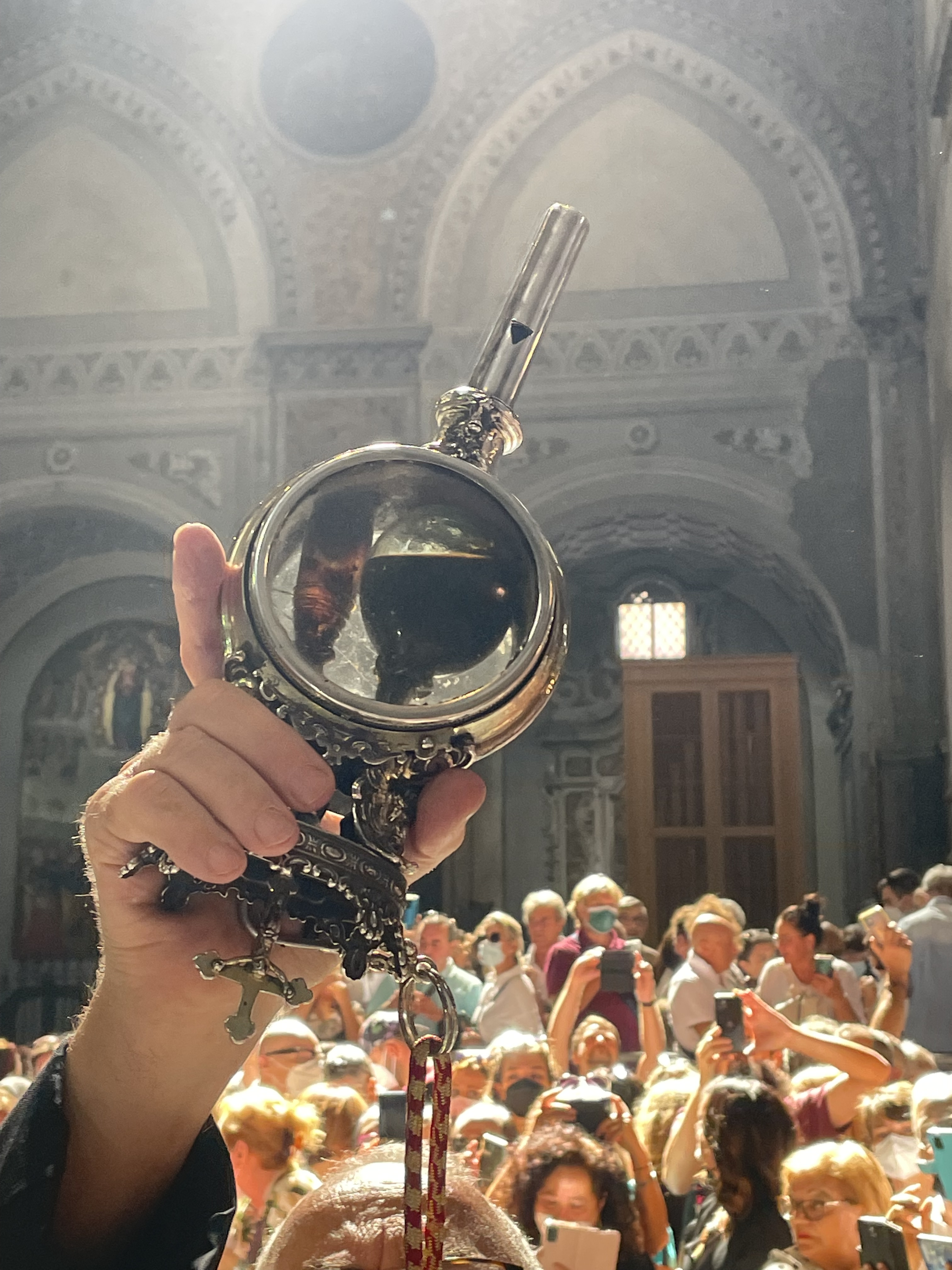
Ampoule associated with Januarius.

The first mention of Januarius' blood occurred ten centuries after his death. According to tradition, his blood is preserved in two sealed ampoules and liquefies during ceremonies held at Naples Cathedral. The liquefaction has been documented since the Middle Ages and has become a major element of Neapolitan religious culture.

Recently, thousands of people assemble to witness this event in Naples Cathedral three times a year: on 19 September (Saint Januarius's Day, commemorating his martyrdom), 16 December (celebrating his patronage of Naples and its archdiocese), and the Saturday before the first Sunday of May (commemorating the reunification of his relics).

While the Catholic Church has always supported the celebrations, it has never formulated an official statement on the phenomenon and maintains a neutral stance about scientific investigations.

=== Patricia of Naples ===
According to local tradition, a vial containing the blood of Patricia of Naples is preserved at the Monastery of Saint Gregory Armeno in Naples. The blood is said to liquefy periodically.

=== Pantaleon ===
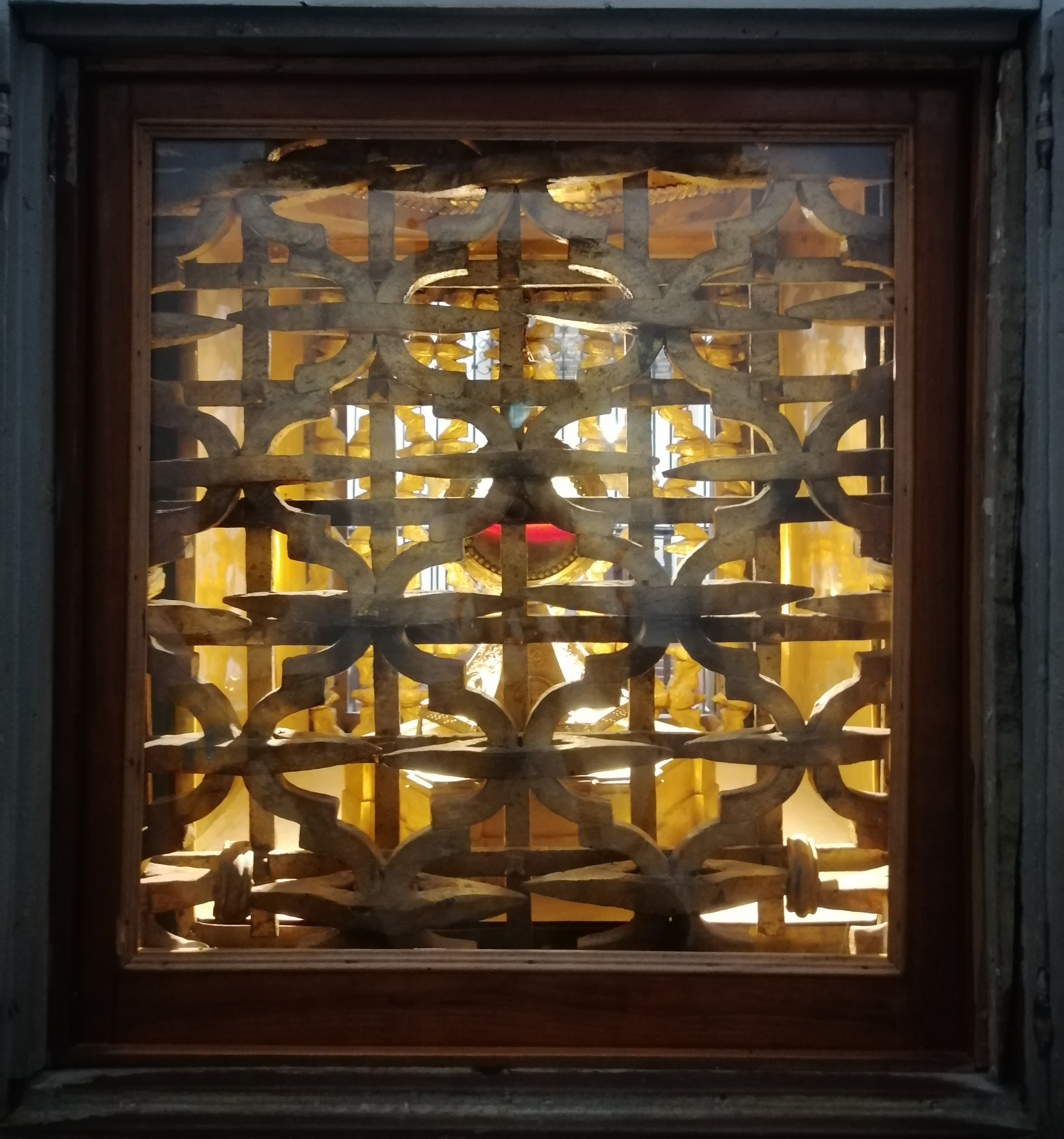
Tabernacle said to contain the blood of Pantaleon, located behind the side altar of Mary of the Assumption and Pantaleon at the Ravello Cathedral

A relic associated with Saint Pantaleon is preserved in Ravello. The substance contained in the relic is reported to liquefy annually and has long been compared with the blood relic of Saint Januarius.

Alphonsus Liguori wrote:

At Ravello, a city in the kingdom of Naples, there is a vial of his blood, which becomes blood every year [on his feastday], and may be seen in this state interspersed with the milk, as I, the author of this work, have seen it.

=== Lawrence of Rome ===
A relic venerated as the blood of Saint Lawrence is preserved in Amaseno. According to local tradition, the relic liquefies during celebrations connected with the saint's feast day.

== Scientific explanations ==
Natural explanations have been proposed and demonstrated for such liquefaction. These include:

- Thixotropy, in which a gel-like substance becomes fluid when agitated. According to Luigi Garlashchelli this is doable using the medieval period's materials and techniques. French physics professor Henri Broch reproduced the miracle using that technique in 1981, with vegetable oil.
- Temperature-dependent melting of low-melting compounds. Components such as fats, waxes, or gelatines, when combined with oil-soluble red dyes will melt when ambient temperatures rise slightly.

Other saints' blood cults have been discontinued since the 16th century, which skeptic James Randi takes as evidence that local artisans or alchemists had a secret recipe for manufacturing this type of relic.

Church authorities have been reluctant to allow researchers to investigate the phenomenon directly by studying the vial's exact contents.

Luigi Garlaschelli in 2026 would release another study on the phenomenon of liquifying blood relics across Italy, and restated that they can be replicated using only 14th century materials, similar to his previous work in the 1990s and 2000s. The investigation included those of St. Lawrence, St. Pantaleone and that of St. Januarius.

== Historical study ==
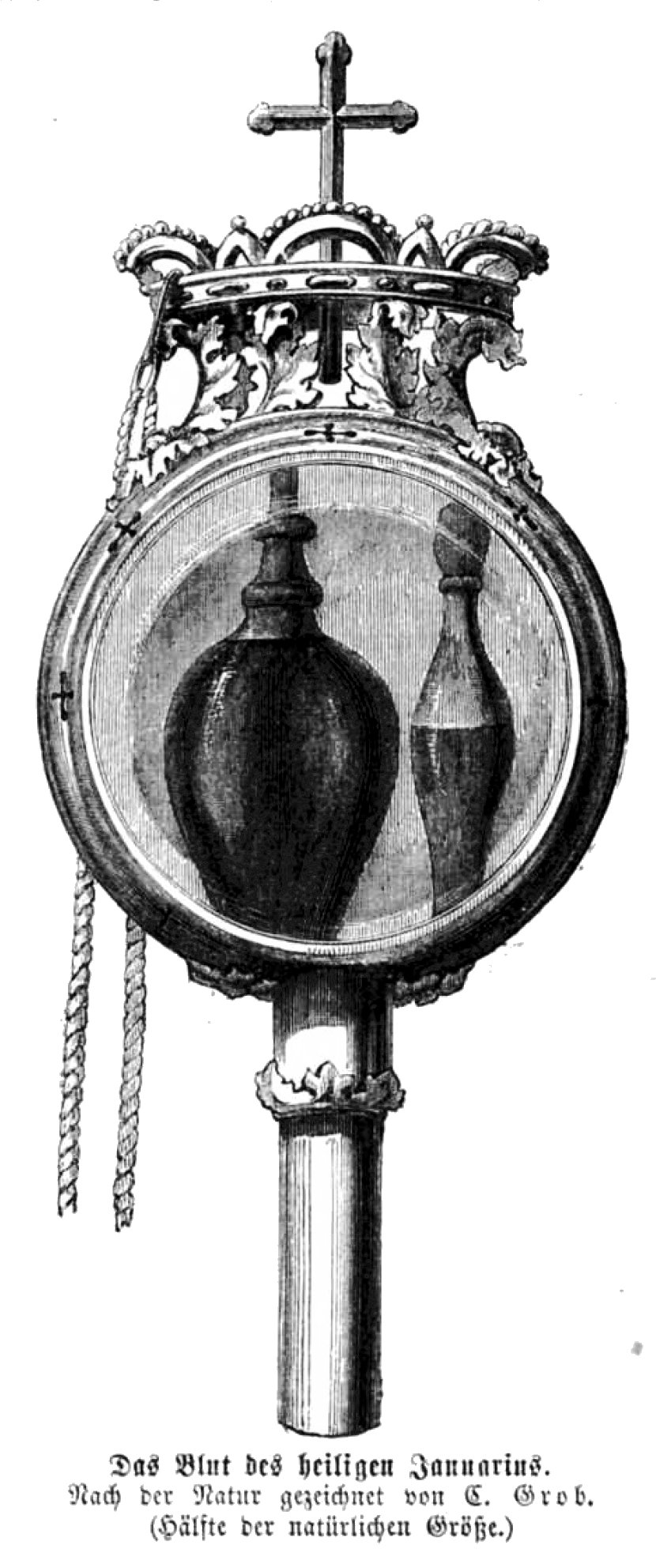
Drawing of the reliquary containing the two ampoules said to hold Januarius' blood, c. 1860

The liquefaction of blood relics has been discussed by historians of religion and historians of science. Francesco Paolo de Ceglia has argued that debates surrounding the blood of Saint Januarius reflected broader developments in early modern European thought regarding miracles and natural philosophy. Helen Hills has examined the role of the relic of Saint Januarius within the religious and artistic culture of Naples.

== Usage in literature ==
Voltaire used January's liquefying blood relic as an example when writing that while the unthinking masses will blindly follow both truth and folly alike, presenting absurd superstitions as religious fact to critical thinkers is dangerous, as it causes them to realize the falsehood, and reject faith entirely.

Alexandre Dumas argued that if it is a trickery, it being kept secret for centuries would be more miraculous than the miracle itself.

Sigmund Freud used an allusion to the miracle of the liquefaction of Saint Januarius's blood to complete one of his analyses.

== See also ==
- Relic of the Holy Blood
- Weeping Statues
