= Sisters of the Precious Blood (Monza) =

Religious organization in Italy

- 45°35′01″N 09°16′25″E

Founder
- Marie Mathilde Bucchi

Regions with significant populations
- Italy: Monza (headquarters) and 18 others locations including Rome and Palermo.
- Brazil: Pará and around 20 other locations including Brasília and Fortaleza.
- Kenya: Nairobi
- Timor-Leste: Dili
- Myanmar: Mingaladon Township

Religions
- Christianity

Website
- preziosine.it

The Sisters of the Precious Blood (Latin: Congregationis Sororum a Pretiosissimo Sanguine, English: sometimes referred to as Congregation sisters of the Most Precious Blood) is a female religious teaching and social congregation of pontifical right founded in Monza in 1874 and still headquartered there as of 2021. It is dedicated to teaching, charity and social works present in Italy, Brazil, Kenya, Timor-Leste and Myanmar. In 2017, the congregation had 385 sisters in 55 communities.

== History ==
In 1852, a community of young women under the leadership of Marie Mathilde Bucchi (1812–1882) began to work with the Canossian Daughters of Charity in Monza with the aim of creating a Third Order. When it became clear that the community could not continue to work within the Canossian congregation because their rules didn't allow these sisters to have nuns from another class, in 1874 the group formed an autonomous religious congregation and Father Juste Pantalini, a barnabite, wrote new religious constitutions for them. The institute was recognized by diocesan right on May 17, 1876 by the Archbishop of Milan Luigi Nazari di Calabiana and received the approval of the Pope on July 10, 1934. In 1938, they opened up to the work of evangelization by helping the barnabites in missions in Pará. The foundress was recognized as venerable on April 28, 2006 and a sister of the Institute, Alfonsa Clerici, was beatified on October 23, 2011.

== See also ==
- Sisters of the Precious Blood
- École Saint-Joseph
