= Issoufou Idrissa =

Nigerien footballer

Boubacar Idrissa
Personal information
- Full name: Boubacar Idrissa Issoufou
- Date of birth: December 13, 1976 (age 49)
- Place of birth: Niger
- Position: Striker

Youth career
- 1993–1998: Kandadji Sport

Senior career*
Years	Team	Apps	(Gls)
2001	Kansas Jayhawks		
2002–2004	Newman Jets		
2005–2008	Hollywood Way SC		

International career
2003–2008	Niger		
- * Club domestic league appearances and goals

Boubacar Idrissa Issoufou (born December 13, 1976) is a Nigerien football striker.

== Career ==
He has played in 2001 for the Kansas Jayhawks, 2002 between 2004 for Newman Jets and from 2005 to 2008 for Hollywood Way (California State). His nickname is 'Denis American'.

== International career ==
He was a member of the Niger national football team.
