= Precious Blood Catholic Church =

Precious Blood Catholic Church may refer to:

== Belgium ==
- Basilica of the Holy Blood (Dutch: Heilig-Bloedbasiliek, built 1134-1157) in Bruges

== Canada ==
- Precious Blood Roman Catholic Church (Winnipeg)
- Precious Blood Cathedral, Sault Ste. Marie, Ontario

== Germany ==
- Holy Blood of Wilsnack (est. 1383), a pilgrimage site in Brandenburg

== Italy ==
- Preziosissimo Sangue di Nostro Signore Gesù Cristo, Rome

== United Kingdom ==
- Church of the Most Precious Blood, Southwark, London
- Westminster Cathedral (Metropolitan Cathedral of the Most Precious Blood), London

== United States ==
- Precious Blood Catholic Church (Los Angeles), California
- Precious Blood Church fire (27 May 27 1875) in Holyoke, Massachusetts, killing 78 people
- Church of the Most Precious Blood (Manhattan), New York
- Precious Blood Catholic Church (Chickasaw, Ohio)
- Monastery of the Precious Blood (built 1923) in Portland, Oregon
- Most Precious Blood Roman Catholic Church, Rectory and Parochial School, Philadelphia, Pennsylvania
- L'Église du Précieux Sang (built 1873) in Woonsocket, Rhode Island

== See also ==
- Most Precious Blood (disambiguation)
- Holy Blood (disambiguation)
- Sisters of the Precious Blood (disambiguation)
- Church on Blood (disambiguation)
