= Bernadines of the Precious Blood =

Religious congregation

The Bernadines of the Precious Blood were a congregation of nuns founded by Mother Ballou with the assistance of St. Francis de Sales, as an offshoot of the Trappistines.
