= Scapular of the Most Precious Blood =

The Scapular of the Most Precious Blood is a Catholic devotional scapular. It is associated with the Archconfraternity of the Most Precious Blood.

== Archconfraternity of the Most Precious Blood ==
Confraternities which made it their special object to venerate the Blood of Christ first arose in Spain. Ravenna, Italy, possessed one at a very early date. The archconfraternity owes its origin to Mgr. Albertini, then priest at San Nicola in Carcere, Rome, where since 1708 devotions in honor of the Precious Blood had been held. Deeply moved by the misery caused by the French Revolution, he united on 8 December 1808, into a society such as were willing to meditate frequently on the Passion and pray for the conversion of sinners, for the needs of the Church, and for the souls in Purgatory. He composed for them the "Chaplet of the Precious Blood" which they were to recite during his daily Mass. The confraternity was canonically erected by Pius VII through his cardinal vicar, 27 February 1809, raised to the rank of an archconfraternity on 26 September 1815.

In England it was erected in the church of St. Wilfrid, Staffordshire, in 1847, but was transferred to the church of the London Oratory on 12 August 1850. Prior to this it had been introduced into America by the Passionists, and canonically erected in the numerous houses and parishes founded by them after their arrival in 1844. As a rule, they enroll such as desire it at the end of their missions.

For the scapular it is prescribed only that it be of red cloth. The scapular as used in Rome bears on one portion a representation of the chalice with the Precious Blood adored by angels; the other segment which hangs at the back is simply a smaller portion of red cloth.

== See also ==
- Scapular
