= Daughters of the Precious Blood =

The Daughters of the Precious Blood were a Roman Catholic female religious order founded in the Netherlands in 1862.

== History ==
The order Daughters of the Precious Blood (Filia Pretiosi Sanguinis) was founded by Maria Seraphina Spiehermans in Sittard (Holland) in 1862. It was approved on 12 July 1890 by Pope Leo XIII who appointed Cardinal Camillo Mazzella as the cardinal protector.

The Daughters of the Precious have been active in helping the Holy Ghost Fathers in German East Africa.

== Description ==
The mission of the Daughters of the Precious Blood is to educate girls and care for the sick. It is based in Koningsbosch.
