= Blood of Christ =

Concepts in Christianity

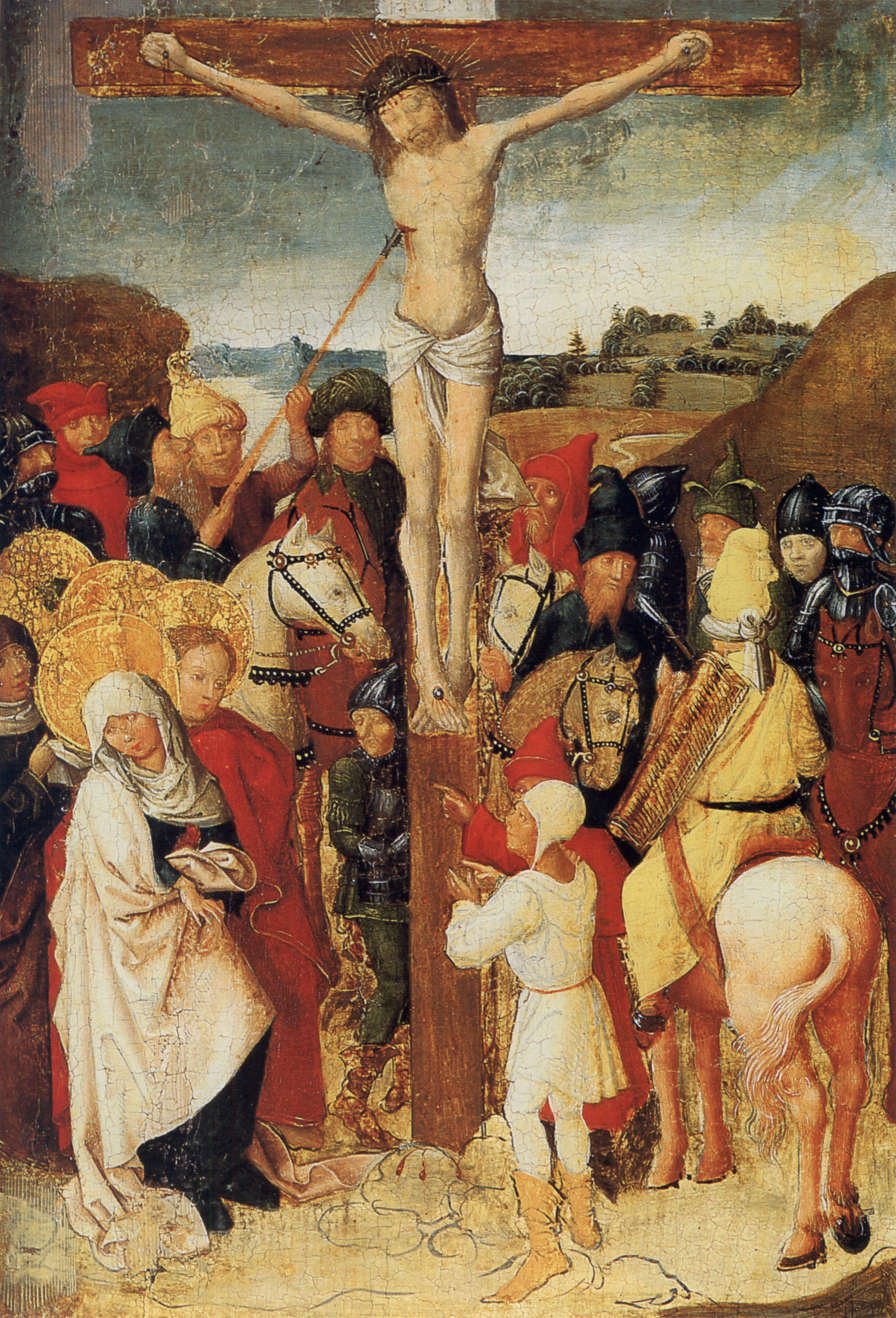
Christ's side pierced by a lance, drawing blood

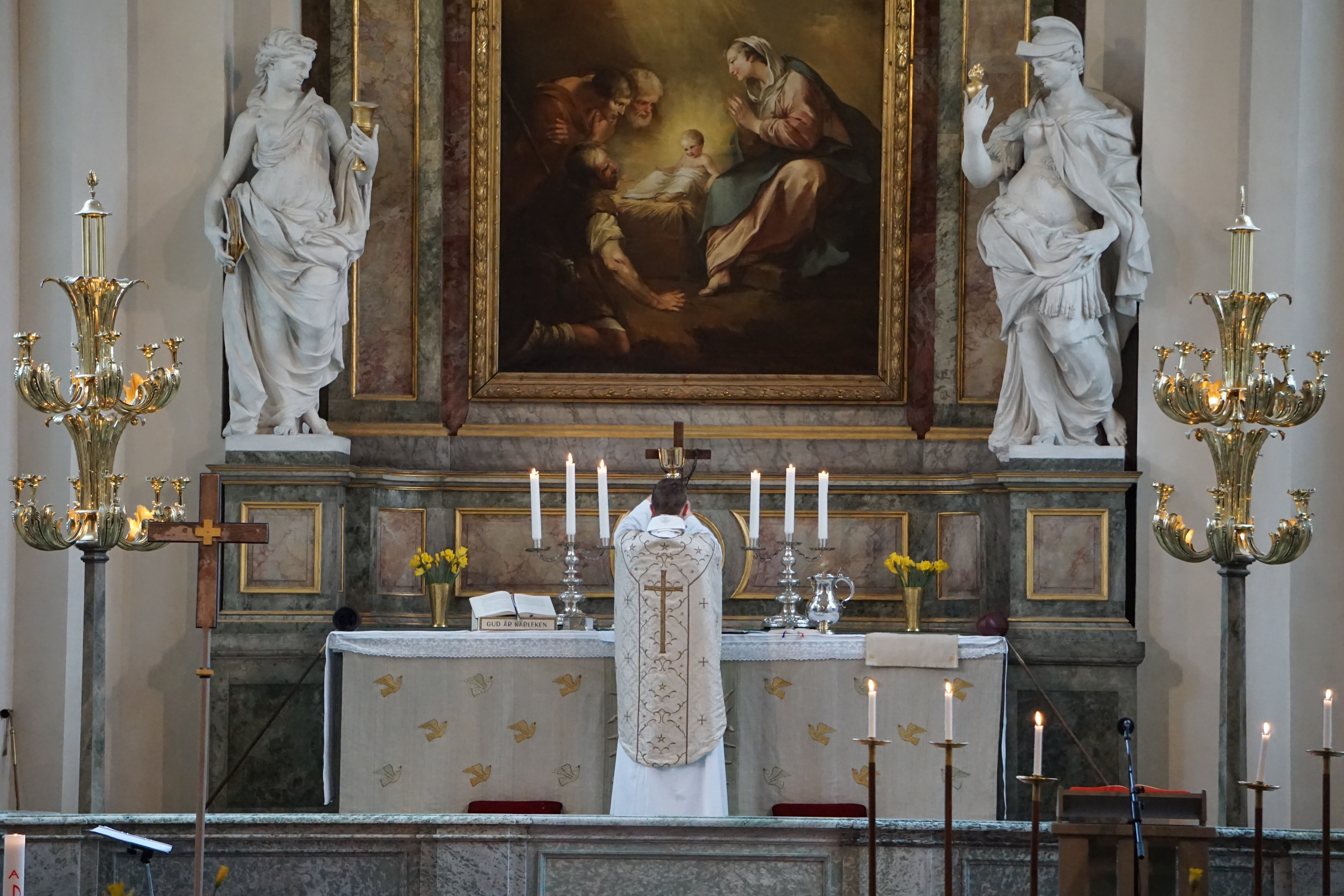
Evangelical-Lutheran priest elevating the chalice during the celebration of the Holy Mass ad orientem at Maria Magdalena Church, Sweden

Blood of Christ, also known as the Most Precious Blood, in Christian theology refers to the physical blood actually shed by Jesus Christ primarily on the Cross, and the salvation which Christianity teaches was accomplished thereby, or the sacramental blood (wine) present in the Eucharist or Lord's Supper, that some Christian denominations believe to be the same blood of Christ shed on the cross.

The Catholic Church, Eastern Orthodox Church, the Oriental Orthodox churches, the Assyrian and Ancient Churches of the East, and the Evangelical-Lutheran churches, together with high church Anglicans, know this as the real presence of Christ in the Eucharist. The Catholic Church uses the term transubstantiation to describe the change of the bread and wine into the body and blood of Christ. The Eastern Orthodox Church used the same term to describe the change, as in the decrees of the 1672 Synod of Jerusalem, and the Catechism of St. Philaret (Drozdov) of Moscow. The Evangelical-Lutheran churches affirm the real presence of Christ in the Eucharist, following the teaching of Martin Luther in defining the presence of Christ in the eucharistic elements as sacramental union, meaning that the fundamental "substance" of the body and blood of Christ are literally present alongside the substance of the bread and wine, which remain present.

The Reformed churches (Continental Reformed, Presbyterian, Reformed Anglican, and Congregationalist traditions) and the Methodist churches teach the real spiritual presence of Christ in the Lord's Supper. The Plymouth Brethren and Unitarians adhere to memorialism.

== History ==
In the early Church, the faithful received the Eucharist in the form of consecrated bread and wine. Saint Maximus explains that in the Old Law the flesh of the sacrificial victim was shared with the people, but the blood of the sacrifice was merely poured out on the altar. Under the New Law, however, Jesus's blood was the drink shared by all of Christ's faithful. St. Justin Martyr, an early Church Father of the 2nd century, speaks of the Eucharist as the same body and blood of Christ that was present in his Incarnation.

The tradition continued in the Church in the East to commingle the species of bread and wine, whereas in the West, the church had the practice of communion under the species of bread and wine separately as the custom, with only a small fraction of bread placed in the chalice. In the West, the communion at the chalice was made less and less efficient, as the dangers of the spread of disease and danger of spillage (which would potentially be sacrilegious) were considered enough of a reason to remove the chalice from common communion altogether, or giving it on only special occasions. However, it was always consecrated and drunk by the priest, regardless of whether or not the laity partook. This was one of the issues debated during the Protestant Reformation. During this time, the Evangelical-Lutheran Churches affirmed the doctrine of communion under both kinds, in which the Body of Christ and the Blood of Christ were offered to the faithful. As a consequence, the Catholic Church first wanted to eliminate ambiguity, reaffirming that Christ was present as body and as blood equally under both species of bread and wine. After the Second Vatican Council, the Catholic Church gave a full permission for all to receive communion from the chalice at every Mass involving a congregation, at the discretion of the priest.

== Theology ==
=== Catholic ===
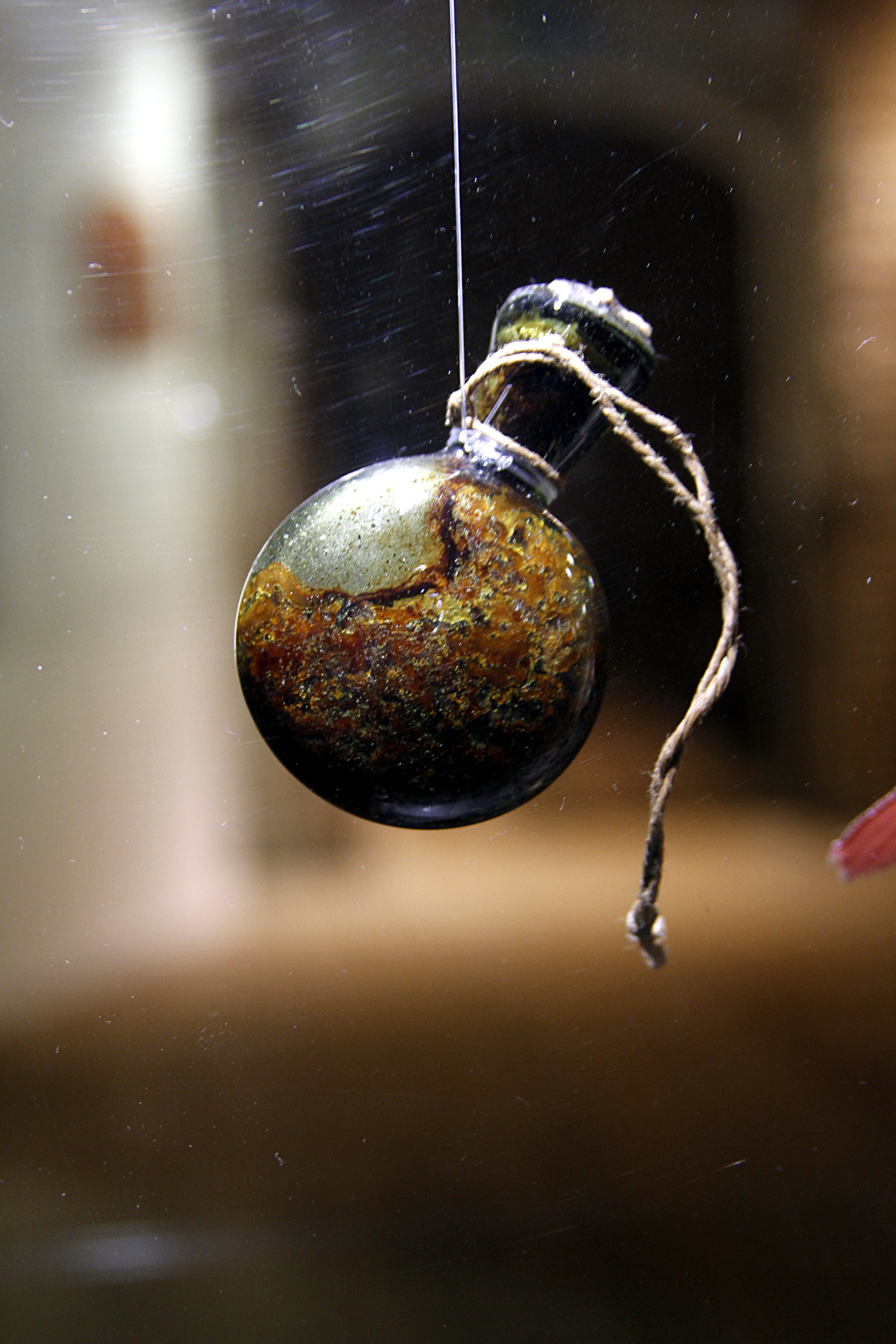
Holy Blood relic in Santa Maria della Scala, Siena.

The Catholic Church teaches that the bread and wine, through transubstantiation, become the body, blood, soul and divinity of Christ—in other words, the whole Christ—when consecrated.

Devotion to the Precious Blood was a special phenomenon of Flemish piety in the fifteenth and sixteenth centuries, that gave rise to the iconic image of Grace as the "Fountain of Life", filled with blood, pouring from the wounded "Lamb of God" or the Holy Wounds of Christ. The image, that was the subject of numerous Flemish paintings, was in part spurred by the renowned relic of the Precious Blood, which had been noted in Bruges at least since the twelfth century, and gave rise, from the late thirteenth century, to the observances, particular to Bruges, of the procession of the "Saint Sang" from its chapel.

Various prayers are part of the Catholic devotion to the Precious Blood. Those that mention the Blood include the Anima Christi, the Chaplet of Mercy of the Holy Wounds of Jesus, and the Chaplet of Divine Mercy.

=== Evangelical-Lutheran ===
The Evangelical-Lutheran churches affirm the real presence of Christ in the Eucharist, with this doctrine being known as the sacramental union; Evangelical-Lutheran theology asserts that the "very body and blood of Christ" is received by the faithful. The real presence of Christ is effected at the Words of Institution:

Throughout his writings, Martin Luther insisted that after the words of institution were spoken, by the power of God’s Word, the true presence of Christ’s Body and Blood had been united to the bread and wine. Particularly interesting writings include his 1520 On the Babylonian Captivity of the Church, where Luther affirmed that the Body and Blood of Christ were present at the time of the elevation—when the pastor raises the host and the chalice after the words of institution.

=== Eastern Orthodox ===
The Eastern Orthodox teach that what is received in Holy Communion is the actual Resurrected Body and Blood of Jesus Christ. In the West, the Words of Institution are considered to be the moment at which the bread and wine become the Body and Blood of Christ. However, for the Eastern Orthodox, there is not one defined moment; rather, all that Orthodox theology states is by the end of the Epiklesis, the change has been completed. The Eastern Orthodox also do not use the Latin theological term Transubstantiation to define the conversion from bread and wine into the Body and Blood of Christ, they use the word metousiosis without the precise theological elaboration that accompanies the term transubstantiation.

==== Devotion ====
In the Eastern Orthodox churches, and those Eastern Catholic Churches which follow the Byzantine Rite, there is no individual devotion to the Blood of Christ separate from the Body of Christ, or separated from the reception of Holy Communion.

When receiving Holy Communion, the clergy (deacons, priests and bishops) will receive the Body of Christ separately from the Blood of Christ. Then, the remaining portions of the consecrated Lamb (Host) is divided up and placed in the chalice and both the Body and Blood of Christ are communicated to the faithful using a liturgical spoon (see also Intinction).

=== Christian Fundamentalism ===
Some Christian Fundamentalists teach that after Jesus' resurrection, he took his blood into heaven and sprinkled it into a literal heavenly mercy seat as a part of his priestly work. According to this doctrine, Jesus carried His blood into heaven, this act being an essential component of His redemptive work for humanity. Proponents of this view often interpret John 20:17—where Jesus tells Mary Magdalene not to touch Him—as indicating that He had not yet completed the task of sprinkling His blood on the heavenly mercy seat.

Some Christians such as Robert Thieme argued that the "blood of Christ" as mentioned in the bible is a mere metaphor for his death, saying the real blood of Christ has no significance in the atonement. Since this position was not held by other faculty members of Dallas theological seminary it caused a local controversy. John Walvoord said to him Christ had to shed his blood to fulfill scriptures such as 1 Peter 1:18-19 and Hebrews 9:22 while Robert G. Walter went somewhat further than Walvoord, arguing that Thieme was outside Christian orthodoxy.

== Artistic depictions ==
The blood shed by Christ was a common theme in early modern Italian art. Paintings of Christ depicted on the cross and as the Man of Sorrows have consistently been some of the bloodiest images in Christian art. The blood of Christ was a compelling artistic symbol of his incarnation and sacrifice. As a theme for contemplation, it provided worshippers with a means to articulate their devotion.

== See also ==
- Blood of Jesus Christ (military order)
- Body of Christ
- Missionaries of the Precious Blood
- Precious Blood Catholic Church
- Feast of the Most Precious Blood
- New Covenant
- Ichor
- Procession of the Holy Blood
- Sacramental wine
- Shroud of Turin
- Society of the Precious Blood – Anglican sisters
- Devotions To The Precious Blood
