= Adorers of the Blood of Christ =

Catholic centralized religious institute

- Sorores Adoratrices Pretiosissimi Sanguinis
- Abbreviation: A.S.C.
- Formation: March 4, 1834; 192 years ago
- Founder: Saint Sr. Maria De Mattias, A.S.C
- Founded at: Acuto, Italy
- Type: Centralized religious institute of consecrated life of pontifical right for women
- Headquarters: Via Beata Maria de Mattias, 10, Rome, Italy
- Members: 1,119 members as of 2020
- Motto: Adoring Love to the Father and Redeeming Love to the humanity, through prayer and service.
- Superior General: Sr. Nadia Coppa, A.S.C.
- Patron saint: St. Francis Xavier
- Parent organization: Catholic Church
- Website: adorers.org

The Adorers of the Blood of Christ (Latin: Sorores Adoratrices Pretiosissimi Sanguinis) are a Catholic centralized religious institute of consecrated life of Pontifical Right for women founded by Maria De Mattias in 1834. Their post-nominal letters are ASC.

The institute operates the Newman University in Wichita, Kansas.

== History ==
The Institute of the Sisters Adorers of the Blood of Christ was established by Maria De Mattias, on March 4, 1834, in Acuto, Italy. She founded it as an active apostolic teaching community, and opened a school for girls. Before long she was joined by others and schools were opened in the small towns of the Papal States and the Kingdom of Naples. On May 30, 1855, Pope Pius IX issued a “decree of praise” approving their work. In 1866, Maria De Mattias died in Rome of tuberculosis. By then sixty-four schools had been opened, including one in London.

In 1875, sisters from Italy established a house in Ruma, Illinois and a second in 1902 in Wichita, Kansas. Sisters from both Wichita and Ruma served the Catholic school in Rulo, Nebraska. In 1933, the Adorers of the Blood of Christ founded Sacred Heart Junior College in Wichita which eventually became Newman University. In March 2014, the order donated 2.5 million dollars to the university. The gift will be used to support emerging science initiatives on the Newman campus.

In October 1992, Sisters Barbara Ann Muttra, Mary Joel Kolmer, Kathleen McGuire, Agnes Mueller, and Shirley Kolmer were killed by soldiers during the first Liberian civil war. In January 2008, Morris Padmore, a former combatant of the defunct National Patriotic Front of Liberia (NPFL) warring faction, testified at the Truth and Reconciliation Commission that the nuns were raped and executed by soldiers under the command of former NPFL general Christopher Vambo. The Adorers of the Blood of Christ were in Liberia since 1971.

== Present day ==
In July 2017, in Columbia, Pennsylvania, the Sisters went to court to oppose the construction of the Atlantic Sunrise pipeline on a right-of-way through their land. In September, a district court judge dismissed the Adorers' complaint. An "open-air" chapel was built in the middle of a corn field to protest the pipeline by erecting a place protected by the freedom of religion in the path of the pipeline to block its construction. A Williams Companies spokesman stated: "We find it ironic that the Adorers would challenge the value of natural gas infrastructure in the lawsuit, while at the same time promoting the availability and use of natural gas at their St. Anne's Retirement Community."

As of 2019, there were about 1,178 members. The motherhouse is in Rome.

== See also ==
- Missionaries of the Precious Blood
- Most Precious Blood (disambiguation)
