= Missionaries of the Precious Blood =

Roman Catholic society of apostolic life

- Congregatio Missionariorum Pretiosissimi Sanguinis (Latin)
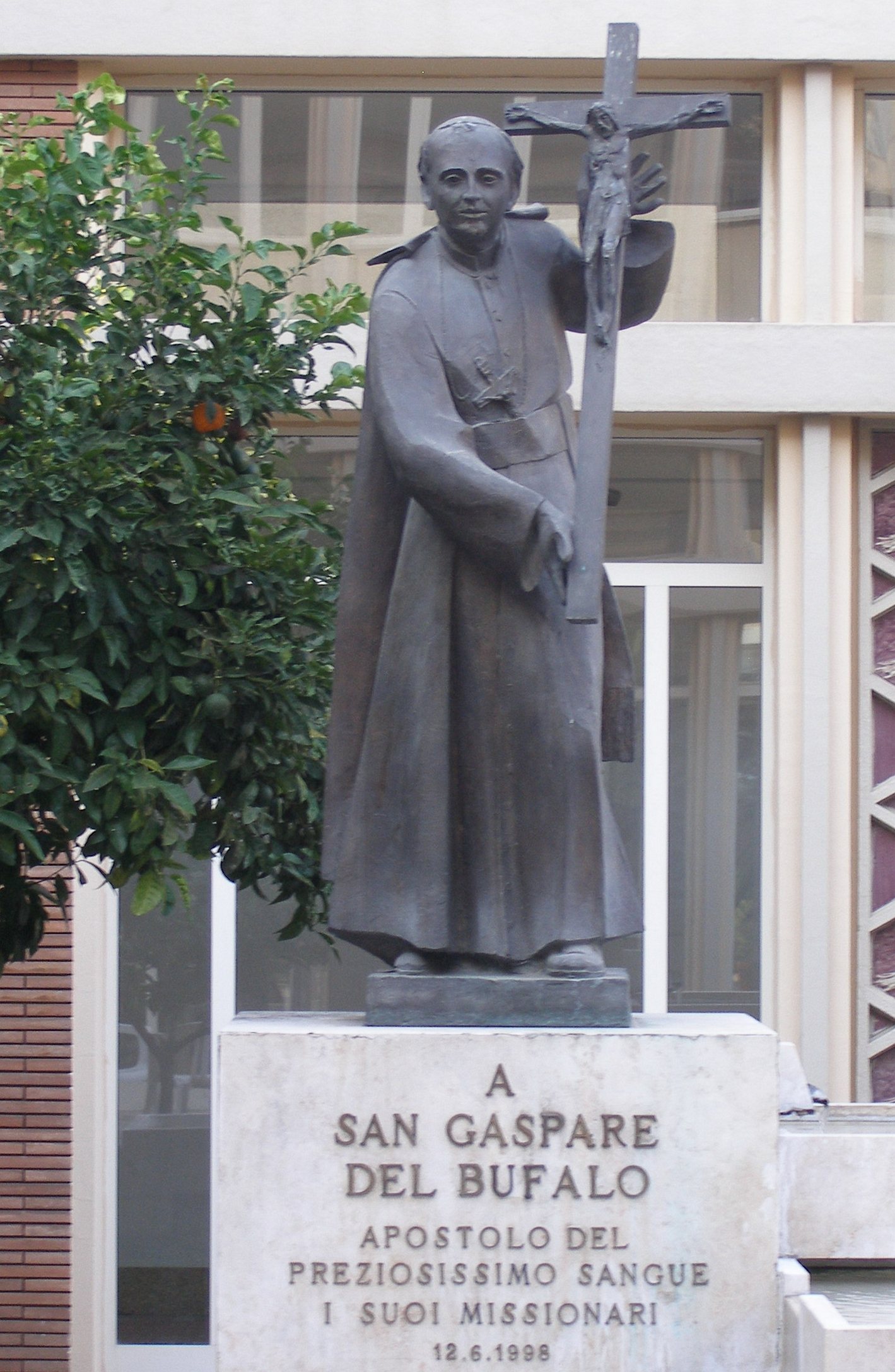
- Statue of Gaspare del Bufalo - Founder of the Congregation
- Abbreviation: C.PP.S. (post-nominal letters)
- Formation: August 15, 1815; 210 years ago
- Founder: Saint Fr. Gaspare del Bufalo, C.PP.S.
- Type: Society of Apostolic Life of Pontifical Right (for Men)
- Headquarters: General Motherhouse; Viale di Porta Ardeatina 66, 00154 Rome, Italy
- Coordinates: 41°54′4.9″N 12°27′38.2″E
- Members: 673 members (484 priests) as of 2018
- Motto: Latin: English:
- Moderator General: Fr. Emanuele Lupi, C.PP.S.
- Parent organization: Roman Catholic Church
- Website: https://www.cppsmissionaries.org/

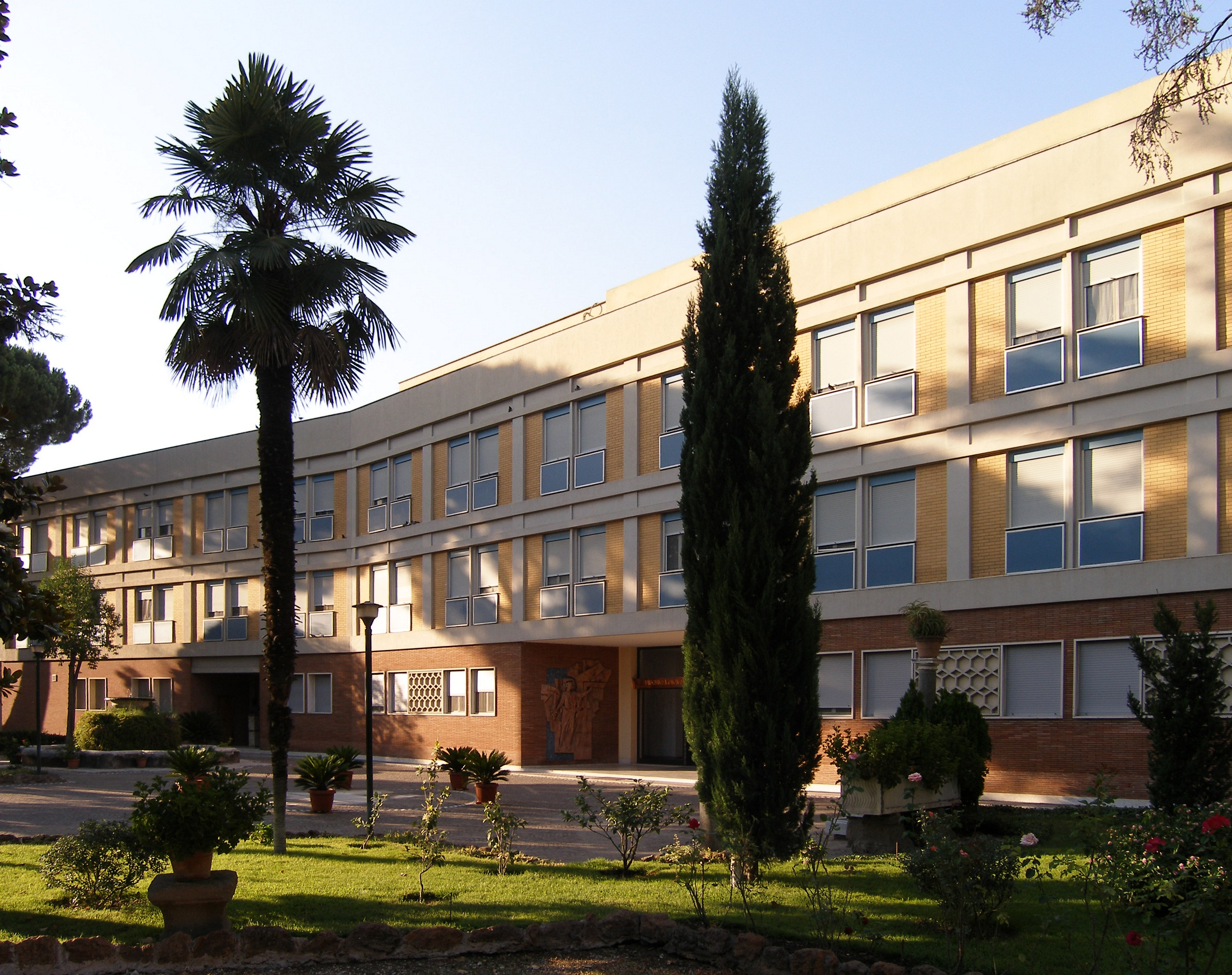
Collegio Preziosissimo Sangue, Rome

The Missionaries of the Precious Blood (Latin: Congregatio Missionariorum Pretiosissimi Sanguinis) is a Catholic community of priests and brothers. The society was founded by Saint Gaspar del Bufalo in 1815.

The name "Missionaries of the Precious Blood" is a shortened English translation of the Latin "Congregatio Missionariorum Pretiosissimi Sanguinis Domini Nostri Jesu Christi" (the Congregation of Missionaries of the Most Precious Blood of Our Lord Jesus Christ). Priests and brothers add the nominal letters C.PP.S. after their names to indicate their membership in the Congregation.

It is a Society of Apostolic Life composed of secular priests and brothers who live in community. Members do not take vows but are held together by the bond of charity only and by a promise of "fidelity to the Congregation of Missionaries of the Precious Blood in accordance with its Constitution and Statutes, giving [themselves] entirely to the service of God": see the formula of incorporation found in C37 of the Normative Texts 2008. The stated charism of the society is to bring the Word of God to where it is most needed.

== History ==
Saint Gaspare del Bufalo founded the society at the request of Pope Pius VII, who was shocked by the spiritual situation in Rome after he returned from exile. Pius decided that missions should be established throughout the Papal States. In 1814, he selected del Bufalo and some other priests to undertake the responsibility, assigning them to the abbey of San Felice at Giano dell'Umbria, in the Umbria region of Italy. Del Bufalo and his confreres made a foundation on 15 August 1815. Soon, several houses were opened, and in 1820 missions were established for the express purpose of reaching out to the bandits who plagued the area.

However, when Leo XII was elected pope in 1823, the growth of the society was checked. Leo XII who, misinformed as to the work of the congregation and its founder, was unfavourably inclined towards its mission and objected to the proposed name, ‘Congregation of the Most Precious Blood’, seeing it as something of a novelty. Eventually, the society was cleared of all accusations and the name was justified by reference to sacred Scripture. When Gaspare died of cholera in 1837 the society had some 200 members and the Rule was given approval in 1841.

Giovanni Merlini was a successor of Gaspare, a native of Spoleto and a friend of Pius IX, who had been elected in 1846, and whose exile at Gaeta he had shared when Pius fled from the Roman Republic in November 1848. Through the influence of Pope Pius IX, several new houses were opened in Italy, and one each in Alsace and Bavaria. The mother-house was established at the Church of Santa Maria in Trivio, Rome. In the 1860s the Italian Government suppressed some twenty-five houses of the society, including the Maria in Trivio property and confiscated the revenues of the seminary at Albano. The Kulturkampf (1871–1878), enacted by the prime minister of Prussia Otto von Bismarck against the Catholic Church, closed the houses in Alsace and in several German-speaking states.

In 1844 the society was introduced into North America by Rev. Francis de Sales Brunner, at the request of John Baptist Purcell the Bishop of Cincinnati. They came to Ohio to serve the German-speaking Catholics. Fr. Brunner's mother, Mother Maria Anna Brunner, established the Sisters of the Precious Blood in Dayton.

The society has remained mostly in the Midwest. It conducts two colleges in Indiana: Calumet College of St. Joseph in Hammond and Saint Joseph's College in Rensselaer (originally a school for Native Americans). It previously ran St. Charles Seminary in Carthagena, Ohio; now a retirement center for priests. The society also runs parishes, primarily in Ohio, Indiana and Missouri. There are also three in California

During the 20th century the Italian province sent members to minister to those of Italian ancestry in North America and eventually, in 1987, these priests and brothers established the Atlantic Province, based in Ontario, Canada. The society continued to prosper throughout and communities were established in Spain (1898), Brazil (1929), Chile (1947), Peru (1962), Tanzania (1966), Guatemala (1976), Croatia (1979), Poland (1982), India (1985), Mexico (1995), Vietnam (1997) and Colombia (2005).

== Formation ==
The members of the society do not undergo a novitiate or take religious vows, but go through a period of formation which takes several years; they also make promises.

Prospective members begin by living in community for a two-year period called ‘Initial Formation’; during this time they experience the daily routine of the members, learn more about the society and engage in some form of apostolic ministry. Candidates undertake daily Eucharist and spiritual direction, and have ample time for prayer and reflection. In North America it is also common for candidates to complete an undergraduate degree if they have not done so previously.

Candidates then enter what is called ‘Special Formation’ which lasts a little longer than a year. During this period, they spend time in other provinces and live with members who are engaged in full-time ministry. If possible they also visit some communities of the Precious Blood Sisters. At the completion of Special Formation, they are temporarily incorporated into the society by making a promise of fidelity and a bond of charity.

In the final stage, the candidates enter ‘Advanced Formation’ during which they focus on how they will serve Christians. For those called to be brothers, training is undertaken in a specific area. They then become permanently incorporated into the society during a ceremony called the Rite of Definitive Incorporation. Those who are called to minister as priests go through the appropriate degree programme at a Catholic university before being ordained to the diaconate and then priesthood. As secular clergy the members of the society take a vow of celibacy as part of being ordained a deacon.

== Ministries ==
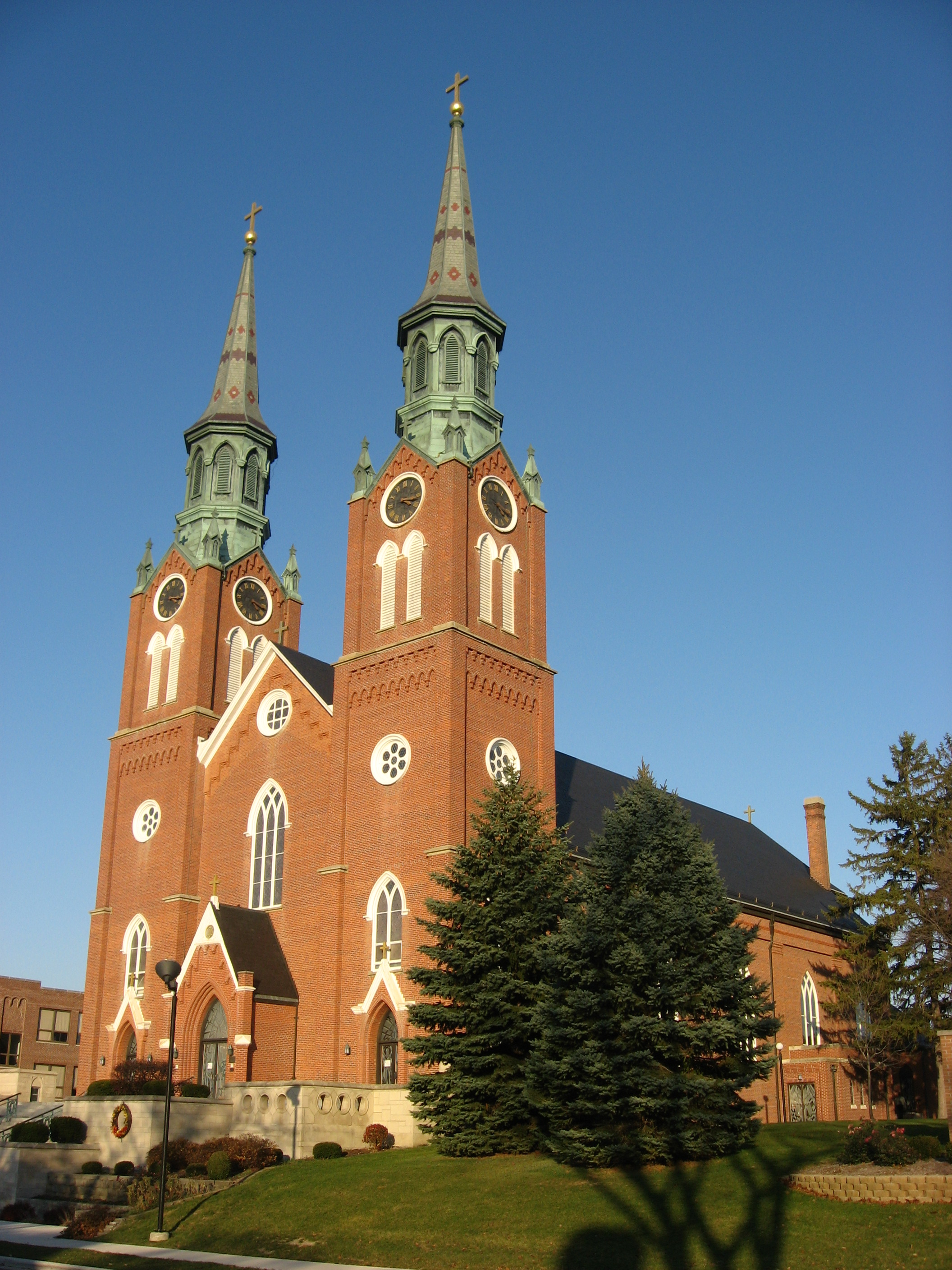
St. Augustine's Catholic Church (Minster, Ohio), a parish staffed by the C.PP.S.

In North America the Missionaries of the Precious Blood minister to those who have experienced family violence and those who live in socio-economically deprived cities such as Chicago. They serve as chaplains in hospitals dedicated to the care of veterans, teach in schools, run parishes and conduct retreats In Europe the members of the society engage in parish ministry, teaching in schools, conducting parish missions, chaplaincy work as well as sending personnel to other countries.

After Vatican II (1962–1965) the society made a concerted effort to minister in more areas of Latin America as well as Africa and Asia. In Tanzania the Canadian members of the society are specifically involved in assisting people to establish and maintain projects such as healthcare, improved agriculture and education. In Chile, the missionaries from the Cincinnati Province minister in a poor parish in Santiago and in the school Saint Gaspar College . In Peru they work in the harsh conditions of La Oroya (one of the most polluted places in the world) a mining town in the Andes. In Guatemala they help staff large urban and rural parishes and established a clinic. In India, due to many states forbidding Hindus from embracing Christianity, the society involves itself with Christians, rather than trying to convert others. The society also ministers to those in the slums, regardless of religion, through such means as health care, caring for street children, orphans and daycare for mothers and children. The Indian Vicariate, there has been great growth in recent years, and the society ordinated 14 young men in 2010.

== Organisation ==
The main administrative body of the society is the General Curia, composed of five elected members: Moderator General, Vice-Moderator and 3 Councillors. Each province, vicariate and mission is headed by a Director elected from among the members.

Collegio Preziosissimo Sangue, Rome

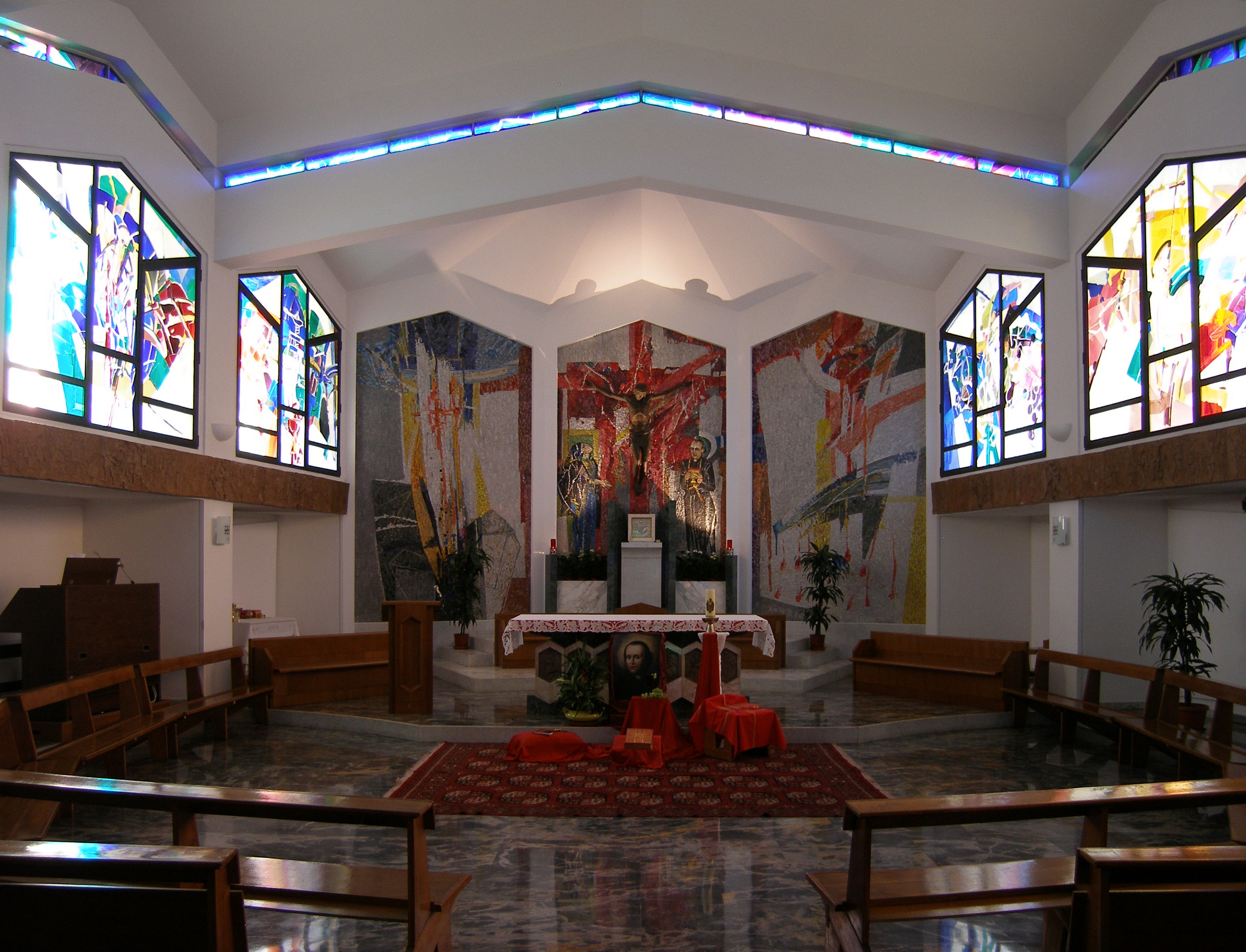
Private chapel

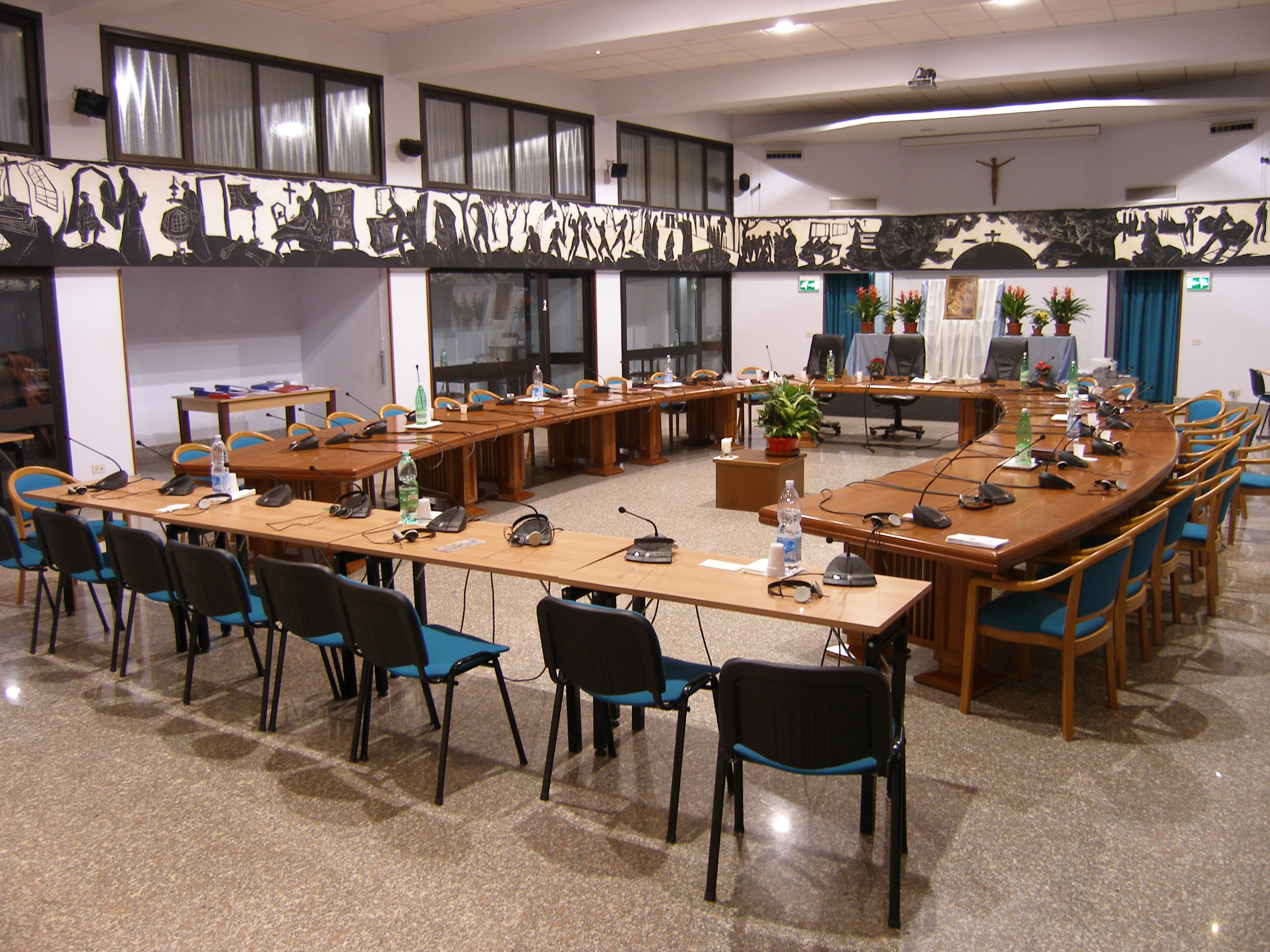
Conference room

As of 2015: Provinces: Atlantic (Canada), Cincinnati, Iberian (Spain and Portugal) Italy, Kansas City, Poland, Tanzania and Teutonic (Austria, Germany and Liechtenstein). Vicariates: Brazil, Chile, and India. Missions: Central America, Colombia, Croatia, Peru, and Vietnam. More than 500 Precious Blood priests and religious brothers serving in about twenty countries.

The congregation also has lay associates, called Companions.

== Spirituality and charism ==
According to the Generalate website,

"Christ's shedding his Blood was for St. Gaspar and is for us the sign of God's great love for all people. This spirituality of the Blood continues to impel us to build community through the inclusion of the marginalized, to walk in solidarity with those who suffer, and to seek reconciliation in a divided world".

After the Second Vatican Council, like all communities, that of the Precious Blood responded to the council's challenge to rediscover their charism. The society, which has maintained its purpose of bringing the Gospel to where it considers it is most needed, declared:

We are united by a bond of charity and rooted in the Spirituality of the Blood of Jesus. We are called to participate in the on-going renewal of the Church and the realisation of the Presence of God among ourselves and those we serve.

In our willingness to be flexible and responsive to changing needs, we fulfill our mission through: • supporting and nurturing one another • embracing a life of prayer • calling forth the gifts of the laity and working in collaboration with them • preaching and witnessing the word of God • promoting conversion and reconciliation

• pursuing justice ever mindful of the poor and marginalised.

== Colleges owned and affiliated ==
- Saint Joseph's College, Indiana
- Calumet College of St. Joseph, Whiting, Indiana

== See also ==
- Adorers of the Blood of Christ
- Consecrated life
- Institutes of consecrated life
- Land of the Cross-Tipped Churches
- Religious institute (Catholic)
- Secular institute
- Vocational Discernment in the Catholic Church
