= General Roman Calendar of 1960 =

Version of the General Roman Calendar

On 25 July 1960, Pope John XXIII approved a revision to the General Roman Calendar by his motu proprio, Rubricarum instructum. It was promulgated by the Sacred Congregation of Rites the following day, 26 July 1960, by the decree Novum rubricarum. This 1960 calendar was incorporated into the 1962 edition of the Roman Missal, continued use of which Pope Benedict XVI authorized in his 7 July 2007 motu proprio Summorum Pontificum, and which Pope Francis updated in his 16 July 2021 motu proprio Traditionis custodes, for use as a Tridentine Mass.

Novum rubricarum replaced the former classifications of Doubles, Semidoubles, and Simples with I, II, and III class feasts and commemorations. It removed some feasts, in particular duplications such as the Feast of the Cross (3 May and 14 September), the Chair of Peter (18 January and 22 February), Saint Peter (1 August and 29 June), Saint John the Evangelist (6 May and 27 December), Saint Michael (8 May and 29 September), and Saint Stephen (3 August and 26 December).

This calendar also incorporated the changes made by Pope Pius XII in 1955, which included the reduction of octaves to three; those of Christmas, Easter and Pentecost.

== Changes to the Calendar ==
=== New ranking system ===
Novum rubricarum abolished the traditional ranking of Sundays, ferias, and feast days as doubles (of varying degrees) and simples—the rank of semidouble having already been suppressed by Pius XII in 1955—and introduced a new system of ranking the various liturgical days of the Roman rite. Feasts previously ranked as doubles of the I class were reclassified as feasts of the I class. Feasts previously ranked as doubles of the II class were reclassified as feasts of the II class. Feasts ranked in 1954 as greater doubles, doubles, and semidoubles were reclassified as feasts of the III class. Feasts that had formerly been ranked as simples and had been reduced to commemorations in Pius XII's 1955 revision of the calendar remained commemorations.

The Sundays of Advent, Lent, and Passiontide, and Low Sunday were classified as Sundays of the I class. All other Sundays of the year—excluding those perpetually impeded by feasts of the I class—became Sundays of the II class.

Ash Wednesday, the ferias of Holy Week, the Paschal Triduum, and the days within the octaves of Easter and Pentecost (including the Ember Days of Pentecost) were classified as ferias of the I class. The ferias of Advent from 17 to 23 December inclusive, the days within the octave of Christmas not impeded by the feasts of saints (29–31 December inclusive), as well as the Ember Days of Advent, Lent, and September were ranked as ferias of the II class. The ferias of Advent, excluding 17–23 December, were ranked as ferias of the III class, as were the ferias of Lent and Passiontide. In addition, the ferias of Lent and Passiontide were given precedence over all feasts of the III class, with III-class feasts reduced to commemorations in years in which they fell during Lent or Passiontide. The remaining ferias of the year were classified ferias of the IV class.

The following feasts were reduced to commemorations:

- the previous greater doubles of
  - Blessed Virgin Mary of Mount Carmel (16 July)
  - Our Lady of Ransom (24 September)
  - The Seven Sorrows of the Blessed Virgin Mary (Friday after the I Sunday in Passiontide)
- the previous doubles of
  - The Impression of the Sacred Stigmata of St. Francis Confessor (17 September)
  - Ss. Eustace and Companions Martyrs (20 September)
  - St. Thomas [of Canterbury] Bishop and Martyr (29 December)
  - St. Sylvester I Pope and Confessor (31 December)
- the previous simples (up to 1955, semidoubles) of
  - St. George Martyr (23 April)
  - St. Alexius Confessor (17 July)
  - Ss. Cyriacus, Largus, and Smaragdus Martyrs (8 August)

The following days of the II class became liturgical days of the I class:

- Octave Day of the Nativity of the Lord (1 January)
- The Commemoration of All the Faithful Departed (2 November or 3 November if 2 November falls on Sunday)

The following greater doubles became liturgical days of the II class:

- The Holy Family of Jesus, Mary, and Joseph (I Sunday after Epiphany)
- The Chair of Saint Peter (22 February)
- The Exaltation of the Holy Cross (14 September)

=== Deletions and additions to the calendar ===
The following feasts were deleted from the calendar:

- doubles of the II class
  - The Finding of the Holy Cross (3 May; considered a duplication of the 14 September feast of the Cross)
- greater doubles
  - The Chair of Saint Peter Apostle at Rome (18 January; merged with the 22 February feast of St. Peter's Chair at Antioch)
  - St. John Apostle and Evangelist Before the Latin Gate (6 May; considered a duplication of the 27 December feast of St. John)
  - The Apparition of St. Michael Archangel (8 May; considered a duplication of the 29 September feast of the Dedication of St. Michael)
  - St. Peter Apostle in Chains (1 August; considered a duplication of the 29 June feast of Ss. Peter and Paul)
- simples (up to 1955, semidoubles)
  - St. Leo II Pope and Confessor (3 July; removed as a result of the transfer of St. Irenaeus to 3 July)
  - St. Anacletus Pope and Martyr (13 July; merged with the 26 April feast of St. Cletus)
  - On the Finding of the Body of St. Stephen Protomartyr (3 August; considered a duplication of the 26 December feast of St. Stephen)

The commemoration of St. Vitalis Martyr (28 April) was likewise deleted, due to doubts about the historicity of his martyrdom.

The following feasts were inscribed in the calendar:

- St. Gregory Barbarigo Bishop and Confessor (17 June, III cl.)
- St. Anthony Mary Claret Bishop and Confessor (23 October, III cl.)

=== Other changes ===
The following feasts were transferred:

- St. Irenaeus Bishop and Martyr (28 June to 3 July; to make room for celebration of the Vigil of Ss. Peter and Paul)
- St. John Mary Vianney Confessor (9 to 8 August; to be nearer to his natalis)

The commemoration of Ss. Sergius, Bacchus, Marcellus, and Apuleius Martyrs was transferred from 7 to 8 October, due to rubrical changes that restricted the number of commemorations allowed on a II-class feast (in this case, the 7 October feast of the Rosary) to only one.

The following titles were changed:

- The Circumcision of the Lord became the Octave Day of the Nativity (1 January)
- The Octave Day of the Epiphany became the Commemoration of the Baptism of the Lord (13 January, II cl.)
- The Chair of St. Peter Apostle at Antioch became The Chair of St. Peter Apostle (22 February)
- The Holy Rosary of the Blessed Virgin Mary became Blessed Virgin Mary of the Rosary (7 October)

The new rubrics also restricted the transferral of impeded feast days that occur in a given year on the same day as a liturgical day of higher rank solely to feasts of the I class (formerly doubles of the I class). Under the older rubrics, both doubles of the I class and doubles of the II class (feasts of the II class under the 1960 rubrics) were transferred when impeded.

=== Post-1960 developments ===
On 25 March 2020, the Congregation for the Doctrine of the Faith made public the decree Cum sanctissima, dated 22 February 2020, which introduced a number of options for use in contemporary celebration of the Office and Mass according to the 1961 Breviary and 1962 Missal. With regard to the liturgical calendar, the decree grants permission for the celebration of feasts of saints canonized after 26 July 1960, using the dates set forth by the Holy See for the liturgical observance of these saints for the universal Church. The decree also allows the option for the celebration of certain III-class feasts during Lent and Passiontide, which heretofore had been forbidden by the 1960 Code of Rubrics.

== January ==
- 1: Octave Day of the Nativity of the Lord, I class.
- 2: Feria.
- 3: Feria.
- 4: Feria.
- 5: Commemoration of St. Telesphorus Pope and Martyr, Comm.
- 6: On the Epiphany of the Lord, I class.
- 7: Feria.
- 8: Feria.
- 9: Feria.
- 10: Feria.
- 11: Commemoration of St. Hyginus Pope and Martyr, Comm.
- 12: Feria.
- 13: On the Commemoration of the Baptism of our Lord Jesus Christ, II class.
- 14: St. Hilary Bishop, Confessor, and Doctor of the Church, III class, Com. of St. Felix Priest and Martyr.
- 15: St. Paul the First Hermit, Confessor, III class, Com. of St. Maurus Abbot.
- 16: St. Marcellus I Pope and Martyr, III class.
- 17: St. Anthony Abbot, III class.
- 18: Commemoration of St. Prisca Virgin and Martyr, Comm.
- 19: Commemoration of Ss. Marius, Martha, Audifax, and Abachum Martyrs, Comm., Com. of St. Canute, Martyr.
- 20: Ss. Fabian Pope and Sebastian Martyrs, III class.
- 21: St. Agnes, Virgin and Martyr, III class
- 22: Ss. Vincent and Anastasius Martyrs, III class.
- 23: St. Raymund of Peñafort Confessor, III class, Com. of St. Emerentiana Virgin and Martyr.
- 24: St. Timothy Bishop and Martyr, III class.
- 25: On the Conversion of St. Paul Apostle, III class, Com. of St. Peter Apostle.
- 26: St. Polycarp Bishop and Martyr, III class.
- 27: St. John Chrysostom Bishop, Confessor, and Doctor of the Church, III class.
- 28: St. Peter Nolasco Confessor, III class, Com. of St. Agnes, Virgin and Martyr second.
- 29: St. Francis de Sales Bishop, Confessor, and Doctor of the Church, III class.
- 30: St. Martina Virgin and Martyr, III class.
- 31: St. John Bosco Confessor, III class.

Sunday between the octave of the Nativity of the Lord and the Epiphany, or, with this lacking, 2 January: The Most Holy Name of Jesus, II class.
I Sunday after Epiphany: The Most Holy Family of Jesus, Mary and Joseph, II class. (Note: Under the Code of Rubrics of 1960, in years in which the feast of the Epiphany (6 January) falls on Sunday, the feast of the Holy Family, which occurs on the following Sunday, takes precedence over the commemoration of the Baptism of our Lord. Under the older rubrics, the feast of the Holy Family was anticipated on the preceding Saturday in years when the Epiphany fell on Sunday, with the octave day of the Epiphany (retitled the commemoration of the Baptism of our Lord in 1960) being observed on Sunday, 13 January.)

== February ==
- 1: St. Ignatius Bishop and Martyr, III class.
- 2: On the Purification of the Blessed Virgin Mary, II class.
- 3: Commemoration of St. Blase Bishop and Martyr, Comm.
- 4: St. Andrew Corsini Bishop and Confessor, III class.
- 5: St. Agatha Virgin and Martyr, III class.
- 6: St. Titus Bishop and Confessor, III class, Com. of St. Dorothy Virgin and Martyr.
- 7: St. Romuald Abbot, III class.
- 8: St. John of Matha Confessor, III class.
- 9: St. Cyril Bishop of Alexandria, Confessor, and Doctor of the Church, III class, Com. of St. Apollonia Virgin and Martyr.
- 10: St. Scholastica Virgin, III class.
- 11: On the Apparition of the Blessed Virgin Mary Immaculate, III class.
- 12: The Seven Holy Founders of the Order of Servants of the Blessed Virgin Mary Confessors, III class.
- 13: Feria.
- 14: Commemoration of St. Valentine Priest and Martyr, Comm.
- 15: Commemoration of Ss. Faustinus and Jovita Martyrs, Comm.
- 16: Feria.
- 17: Feria.
- 18: Commemoration of St. Simeon Bishop and Martyr, Comm.
- 19: Feria.
- 20: Feria.
- 21: Feria.
- 22: Chair of St. Peter, II class, Com. of St. Paul.
- 23: St. Peter Damian Bishop, Confessor, and Doctor of the Church, III class.
- 24: St. Matthias Apostle, II class.
- 25: Feria.
- 26: Feria.
- 27: St. Gabriel of Our Lady of Sorrows, III class
- 28: Feria.

In leap year the month of February is of 29 days, and the feast of St. Matthias is celebrated on the 25th day and the feast of St. Gabriel of Our Lady of Sorrows on the 28th day of February, and twice is said Sixth Kalends, that is on the 24th and 25th; and the dominical letter, which was taken up in the month of January, is changed to the preceding; that, if in January, the dominical letter was A, it is changed to the preceding, which is G, etc.; and the letter F is kept twice, on the 24th and 25th.

== March ==
- 1: Feria.
- 2: Feria.
- 3: Feria.
- 4: St. Casimir Confessor, III class, Com. of St. Lucius I Pope and Martyr.
- 5: Feria.
- 6: Ss. Perpetua and Felicity Martyrs, III class.
- 7: St. Thomas Aquinas Confessor and Doctor of the Church, III class.
- 8: St. John of God Confessor, III class.
- 9: St. Frances of Rome Widow, III class.
- 10: The Forty Holy Martyrs, III class.
- 11: Feria.
- 12: St. Gregory I Pope, Confessor, and Doctor of the Church, III class.
- 13: Feria.
- 14: Feria.
- 15: Feria.
- 16: Feria.
- 17: St. Patrick Bishop and Confessor, III class.
- 18 : St.Cyril Bishop of Jerusalem, Confessor, and Doctor of the Church, III class.
- 19: St. Joseph, Spouse of the Blessed Virgin Mary, Confessor, and Patron of the Universal Church, I class.
- 20: Feria.
- 21: St. Benedict Abbot, III class.
- 22: Feria.
- 23: Feria.
- 24: St. Gabriel the Archangel, III class.
- 25: Annunciation of the Blessed Virgin Mary, I class. (Note: In years in which 25 March falls in either Holy Week or within the octave of Easter, the feast of the Annunciation is transferred to the Monday after Low Sunday.)
- 26: Feria.
- 27: St. John Damascene Confessor and Doctor of the Church, III class
- 28: St. John Capistran Confessor, III class
- 29: Feria.
- 30: Feria.
- 31: Feria.

Friday after the I Sunday in Passiontide: Commemoration of the Seven Sorrows of the Blessed Virgin Mary, Comm.

== April ==
- 1: Feria.
- 2: St. Francis of Paula Confessor, III class.
- 3: Feria.
- 4: St. Isidore Bishop, Confessor, and Doctor of the Church, III class.
- 5: St. Vincent Ferrer Confessor, III class.
- 6: Feria.
- 7: Feria.
- 8: Feria.
- 9: Feria.
- 10: Feria.
- 11: St. Leo I Pope, Confessor, and Doctor of the Church, III class.
- 12: Feria.
- 13: St. Hermenegild Martyr, III class.
- 14: St. Justin, III class, Com. of Saints Tiburtius, Valerian and Maximus Martyrs.
- 15: Feria.
- 16 : Feria.
- 17: Commemoration of St. Anicetus Pope and Martyr, Comm.
- 18: Feria.
- 19: Feria.
- 20: Feria.
- 21: St. Anselm Bishop, Confessor, and Doctor of the Church, III class.
- 22: Ss. Soter and Cajus Popes and Martyrs, III class.
- 23: Commemoration of St. George Martyr, Comm.
- 24: St. Fidelis of Sigmaringen Martyr, III class.
- 25: Greater Litany. – St. Mark Evangelist, II class.
- 26: Ss. Cletus and Marcellinus Popes and Martyrs, III class.
- 27: St. Peter Canisius Confessor and Doctor of the Church, III class.
- 28: St. Paul of the Cross Confessor, III class.
- 29: St. Peter Martyr, III class.
- 30: St. Catherine of Siena Virgin and Doctor of the Church, III class.

== May ==
- 1: St. Joseph the Workman, Spouse of the Blessed Virgin Mary, Confessor, I class.
- 2: St. Athanasius, Bishop, Confessor, and Doctor of the Church, III class.
- 3: Commemoration of Ss. Alexander, Eventius and Theodulus Martyrs, and Juvenal, Bishop and Confessor, Comm.
- 4: St. Monica Widow, III class.
- 5: St. Pius V Pope and Confessor, III class.
- 6: Feria.
- 7: St. Stanislaus Bishop and Martyr, III class.
- 8: Feria.
- 9: St. Gregory Nazianzen Bishop, Confessor, and Doctor of the Church, III class.
- 10: St. Antoninus Bishop and Confessor, III class, Com. of Ss. Gordian and Epimachus.
- 11: Ss. Philip and James Apostles, II class.
- 12: Ss. Nereus, Achilleus, Domitilla Virgin, and Pancras Martyrs, III class.
- 13: St. Robert Bellarmine Bishop, Confessor, and Doctor of the Church, III class.
- 14: Commemoration of St. Boniface Martyr, Comm.
- 15: St. John Baptist de la Salle Confessor, III class.
- 16: St. Ubald Bishop and Confessor, III class.
- 17: St. Paschal Baylon Confessor, III class.
- 18: St. Venantius Martyr, III class.
- 19: St. Peter Celestine Pope and Confessor, III class, Com. of St. Pudentiana Virgin.
- 20: St. Bernardine of Siena Confessor, III class.
- 21: Feria.
- 22: Feria.
- 23: Feria.
- 24: Feria.
- 25: St. Gregory VII Pope and Confessor, III class, Com. of St. Urban I Pope and Martyr.
- 26: St. Philip Neri Confessor, III class, Com. of St. Eleutherius Pope and Martyr.
- 27: St. Bede the Venerable Confessor and Doctor of the Church, III class, Com. of St. John I Pope and Martyr.
- 28: St. Augustine Bishop and Confessor, III class.
- 29: St. Mary Magdalen de Pazzi Virgin, III class.
- 30: Commemoration of St. Felix I Pope and Martyr, Comm.
- 31: Blessed Virgin Mary, Queen, II class, Com. of St. Petronilla Virgin.

== June ==
- 1: St. Angela Merici Virgin, III class.
- 2: Commemoration of Ss. Marcellinus, Peter, and Erasmus Bishop, Martyrs, Comm.
- 3: Feria.
- 4: St. Francis Caracciolo Confessor, III class.
- 5: St. Boniface Bishop and Martyr, III class.
- 6: St. Norbert Bishop and Confessor, III class.
- 7 : Feria.
- 8: Feria.
- 9: Commemoration of Ss. Primus and Felician Martyrs, Comm.
- 10: St. Margaret Queen, Widow, III class.
- 11: St. Barnabas Apostle, III class.
- 12: St. John of San Facundo Confessor, III class, Com. of Ss. Basilides, Cyrinus, Nabor and Nazarius Martyrs.
- 13: St. Anthony of Padua Confessor and Doctor of the Church, III class.
- 14: St. Basil the Great Bishop, Confessor, and Doctor of the Church, III class.
- 15: Commemoration of Ss. Vitus, Modestus, and Crescentia Martyrs, Comm.
- 16: Feria.
- 17: St. Gregory Barbarigo Bishop and Confessor, III class.
- 18: St. Ephraem Syrus Deacon, Confessor, and Doctor of the Church, III class, Com. of Ss. Mark and Marcellianus Martyrs.
- 19: St. Juliana Falconieri Virgin, III class, Com. of Ss. Gervase and Protase Martyrs.
- 20: Commemoration of St. Silverius Pope and Martyr, Comm.
- 21: St. Aloysius Gonzaga Confessor, III class.
- 22: St. Paulinus Bishop and Confessor, III class
- 23: Vigil, II class.
- 24: On the Nativity of St. John the Baptist, I class.
- 25: St. William Abbot, III class.
- 26: Ss. John and Paul Martyrs, III class.
- 27: Feria.
- 28: Vigil, II class.
- 29: Ss. Peter and Paul Apostles, I class.
- 30: On the Commemoration of St. Paul Apostle, III class, Com. of St. Peter Apostle.

== July ==
- 1: The Most Precious Blood of our Lord Jesus Christ, I class.
- 2: On the Visitation of the Blessed Virgin Mary, II class, Com. of Ss. Processus and Martinian Martyrs.
- 3: St. Irenaeus Bishop, Martyr, and Doctor of the Church, III class.
- 4: Feria.
- 5: St. Anthony Mary Zaccaria Confessor, III class.
- 6: Feria.
- 7: Ss. Cyril and Methodius Bishops and Confessors, III class.
- 8: St. Elizabeth Queen, Widow, III class.
- 9: Feria.
- 10: The Seven Holy Brothers Martyrs, and Ss. Rufina and Secunda Virgins and Martyrs, III class.
- 11: Commemoration of St. Pius I Pope and Martyr, Comm.
- 12: St. John Gualbert Abbot, III class, Com. of Ss. Nabor and Felix Martyrs.
- 13: Feria.
- 14: St. Bonaventure Bishop, Confessor, and Doctor of the Church, III class.
- 15: St. Henry II Emperor, Confessor, III class.
- 16: Commemoration of the Blessed Virgin Mary of Mt. Carmel, Comm.
- 17: Commemoration of St. Alexius Confessor, Comm.
- 18: St. Camillus de Lellis Confessor, III class, Com. of St. Symphorosa and her seven Sons Martyrs.
- 19: St. Vincent de Paul Confessor, III class.
- 20: St. Jerome Emiliani Confessor, III class, Com. of St. Margaret Virgin Martyr.
- 21: St. Lawrence of Brindisi Confessor and Doctor of the Church, III class, Com. of St. Praxedes Virgin.
- 22: St. Mary Magdalene Penitent, III class.
- 23: St. Apollinaris Bishop and Martyr, III class, Com. of St. Liborius Bishop and Confessor.
- 24: Commemoration of St. Christina Virgin and Martyr.
- 25: St. James Apostle, II class, Com. of St. Christopher Martyr.
- 26: St. Anne Mother of the Blessed Virgin Mary, II class.
- 27: Commemoration of St. Pantaleon Martyr, Comm.
- 28: Ss. Nazarius and Celsus Martyrs, Victor I Pope and Martyr, and St. Innocent I Pope and Confessor, III class.
- 29: St. Martha Virgin, III class, Com. of Ss. Felix, Simplicius, Faustinus, and Beatrice Martyrs.
- 30: Commemoration of Ss. Abdon and Sennen Martyrs, Comm.
- 31: St. Ignatius Confessor, III class.

== August ==
- 1: Commemoration of the Holy Machabees Martyrs, Comm.
- 2: St. Alphonsus Mary of Liguori Bishop, Confessor, and Doctor of the Church, III class, Com. of St. Stephen I Pope and Martyr.
- 3: Feria.
- 4: St. Dominic Confessor, III class.
- 5: On the Dedication of Our Lady of the Snows, III class.
- 6: On the Transfiguration of our Lord Jesus Christ, II class, Com. of Ss. Xystus II Pope, Felicissimus, and Agapitus Martyrs.
- 7: St. Cajetan Confessor, III class, Com. of St. Donatus Bishop and Martyr.
- 8: St. John Mary Vianney Confessor and Priest, III class, Com. of Ss. Cyriacus, Largus, and Smaragdus Martyrs.
- 9: Vigil, III class, Com. of St. Romanus Martyr.
- 10: St. Laurence Martyr, II class.
- 11: Commemoration of Ss. Saint Tiburtius and Saint Susanna Virgin, Martyrs, Comm.
- 12: St. Clare Virgin, III class.
- 13: Commemoration of Ss. Hippolytus and Cassian Martyrs, Comm.
- 14: Vigil, II class, Com. of St. Eusebius Confessor.
- 15: On the Assumption of the Blessed Virgin Mary, I class.
- 16: St. Joachim Father of the Blessed Virgin Mary, Confessor, II class.
- 17: St. Hyacinth of Poland Confessor, III class.
- 18: Commemoration of St. Agapitus Martyr, Comm.
- 19: St. John Eudes Confessor, III class.
- 20: St. Bernard Abbot and Doctor of the Church, III class.
- 21: St. Jane Frances de Chantal Widow, III class.
- 22: Immaculate Heart of the Blessed Virgin Mary, II class, Com. of Ss. Timothy and Companions Martyrs.
- 23: St. Philip Benizi Confessor, III class.
- 24: St. Bartholomew Apostle, II class.
- 25: St. Louis King, Confessor, III class.
- 26: Commemoration of St. Zephyrinus Pope Martyr, Comm.
- 27: St. Joseph Calasanctius Confessor, III class.
- 28: St. Augustine Bishop, Confessor, and Doctor of the Church, III class, Com. of St. Hermes Martyr.
- 29: On the Beheading of St. John the Baptist, III class, Com. of St. Sabina Martyr.
- 30: St. Rose of Lima Virgin, III class, Com. of Ss. Felix and Adauctus Martyrs.
- 31: St. Raymond Nonnatus Confessor, III class.

== September ==
- 1: Commemoration of St. Giles Abbot, Comm, Com. of the Holy Twelve Brothers Martyrs.
- 2: St. Stephen King, Confessor, III class.
- 3: St. Pius X Pope and Confessor, III class.
- 4: Feria.
- 5: St. Laurence Justinian Bishop and Confessor, III class.
- 6: Feria.
- 7: Feria.
- 8: On the Nativity of the Blessed Virgin Mary, II class, Com. of St. Hadrian Martyr.
- 9: Commemoration of St. Gorgonius Martyr, Comm.
- 10: St. Nicholas of Tolentino Confessor, III class.
- 11: Commemoration of Ss. Protus and Hyacinth Martyrs, Comm.
- 12: The Most Holy Name of Mary, III class.
- 13: Feria.
- 14: On the Exaltation of the Holy Cross, II class.
- 15: Seven Sorrows of the Blessed Virgin Mary, II class, Com. of St. Nicomedes Martyr.
- 16: St. Cornelius Pope and St. Cyprian Bishop, Martyrs, III class, Com. of Ss. Euphemia Virgin, Lucy and Geminianus Martyrs.
- 17: Commemoration of the Impression of the sacred Stigmata of St. Francis Confessor, Comm.
- 18: St. Joseph of Cupertino Confessor, III class.
- 19: St. Januarius Bishop and Companions Martyrs, III class.
- 20: Commemoration of St. Eustace and Companions Martyrs, Comm.
- 21: St. Matthew Apostle and Evangelist, II class.
- 22: St. Thomas of Villanova Bishop and Confessor, III class, Com. of Ss. Maurice and Companions Martyrs.
- 23: St. Linus Pope and Martyr, III class, Com. of St. Thecla Virgin and Martyr.
- 24: Commemoration of Our Lady of Ransom, Comm.
- 25: Feria.
- 26: Commemoration of Ss. Cyprian and Justina Virgin, Martyrs, Comm.
- 27: Ss. Cosmas and Damian Martyrs, III class.
- 28: St. Wenceslaus Duke, Martyr, III class.
- 29: On the Dedication of St. Michael Archangel, I class.
- 30: St. Jerome Priest, Confessor, and Doctor of the Church, III class.

== October ==
- 1: Commemoration of St. Remigius Bishop and Confessor, Comm.
- 2: The Holy Guardian Angels, III class.
- 3: St. Teresa of the Child Jesus Virgin and Doctor of the Church, III class.
- 4: St. Francis of Assisi Confessor, III class.
- 5: Commemoration of St. Placid and companions Martyrs, Comm.
- 6: St. Bruno Confessor, III class.
- 7: Blessed Virgin Mary of the Rosary, II class, Com. of St. Mark Pope and Confessor.
- 8: St. Bridget Widow, III class, Com. of Ss. Sergius and Bacchus, Marcellus and Apuleius Martyrs.
- 9: St. John Leonard Confessor, III class, Com. of St. Denis Bishop, Rusticus Priest, and Eleutherius Martyrs.
- 10: St. Francis Borgia Confessor, III class.
- 11: The Maternity of the Blessed Virgin Mary, II class.
- 12: Feria.
- 13: St. Edward King, Confessor, III class.
- 14: St. Callistus I Pope and Martyr, III class.
- 15: St. Teresa Virgin and Doctor of the Church, III class.
- 16: St. Hedwig Widow, III class.
- 17: St. Margaret Mary Alacoque Virgin, III class.
- 18: St. Luke Evangelist, II class.
- 19: St. Peter of Alcantara Confessor, III class.
- 20: St. John Cantius Confessor, III class.
- 21: Commemoration of St. Hilarion Abbot, Comm., Com. of St. Ursula and Companions Virgins and Martyrs.
- 22: Feria.
- 23: St. Anthony Mary Claret Bishop and Confessor, III class.
- 24: St. Raphael Archangel, III class.
- 25: Commemoration of Ss. Chrysanthus and Daria Martyrs, Comm.
- 26: Commemoration of St. Evaristus Pope and Martyr, Comm.
- 27: Feria.
- 28: Ss. Simon and Jude Apostles, II class.
- 29: Feria.
- 30: Feria.
- 31: Feria.

Last Sunday in October: Our Lord Jesus Christ the King, I class.

== November ==
- 1: All Saints, I class.
- 2 or, if 2 November is a Sunday, 3 November: On the Commemoration of all the Faithful Departed, I class.
- 3: Feria.
- 4: St. Charles Bishop and Confessor, III class, Com. of Ss. Vitalis and Agricola Martyrs.
- 5: Feria.
- 6: Feria.
- 7: Feria.
- 8: Commemoration of the Holy Four Crowned Martyrs, Comm.
- 9: On the Dedication of the Archbasilica of the most Holy Saviour, II class, Com. of St. Theodore Martyr.
- 10: St. Andrew Avellino Confessor, III class, Com. of Ss. Tryphon, Respicius, and Nympha Martyrs.
- 11: St. Martin Bishop and Confessor, III class, Com. of St. Mennas Martyr.
- 12: St. Martin I Pope and Martyr, III class.
- 13: St. Didacus Confessor, III class.
- 14: St. Josaphat Bishop and Martyr, III class.
- 15: St. Albert the Great Bishop, Confessor, and Doctor of the Church, III class.
- 16: St. Gertrude Virgin, III class.
- 17: St. Gregory Thaumaturgus Bishop and Confessor, III class.
- 18: On the Dedication of the Basilicas of Ss. Peter and Paul, III class.
- 19: St. Elizabeth Widow, III class, Com. of St. Pontianus Pope and Martyr.
- 20: St. Felix of Valois Confessor, III class.
- 21: On the Presentation of the Blessed Virgin Mary, III class.
- 22: St. Cecilia Virgin and Martyr, III class.
- 23: St. Clement I Pope and Martyr, III class, Com. of St. Felicitas Martyr.
- 24: St. John of the Cross Confessor and Doctor of the Church, III class, Com. of St. Chrysogonus Martyr.
- 25: St. Catherine Virgin and Martyr, III class.
- 26: St. Sylvester Abbot, III class, Com. of St. Peter of Alexandria Bishop and Martyr.
- 27: Feria.
- 28: Feria.
- 29: Commemoration of St. Saturninus Martyr, Comm.
- 30: St. Andrew Apostle, II class.

== December ==
- 1: Feria.
- 2: St. Bibiana Virgin and Martyr, III class.
- 3: St. Francis Xavier Confessor, III class.
- 4: St. Peter Chrysologus Bishop, Confessor, and Doctor of the Church, III class, Com. of St. Barbara Virgin and Martyr.
- 5: Commemoration of St. Sabbas Abbot, Comm.
- 6: St. Nicholas Bishop and Confessor, III class.
- 7: St. Ambrose Bishop, Confessor, and Doctor of the Church, III class.
- 8: On the Immaculate Conception of the Blessed Virgin Mary, I class.
- 9: Feria.
- 10: Commemoration of St. Melchiades Pope and Martyr, Comm.
- 11: St. Damasus I Pope and Confessor, III class.
- 12: Feria.
- 13: St. Lucy Virgin and Martyr, III class.
- 14: Feria.
- 15: Feria.
- 16: St. Eusebius Bishop and Martyr, III class.
- 17: Feria.
- 18: Feria.
- 19: Feria.
- 20: Feria.
- 21: St. Thomas Apostle, II class.
- 22: Feria.
- 23: Feria.
- 24: Vigil, I class.
- 25: On the Nativity of our Lord Jesus Christ, I class with II class octave. In the second Mass: Commemoration of St. Anastasia Martyr.
- 26: II day within the octave of the Nativity of the Lord: St. Stephen Protomartyr, II class.
- 27: III day within the octave of the Nativity of the Lord: St. John Apostle and Evangelist, II class.
- 28: IV day within the octave of the Nativity of the Lord: The Holy Innocents Martyrs, II class.
- 29: Of the V day within the octave of the Nativity of the Lord, II class, Commemoration of St. Thomas Bishop and Martyr.
- 30: Of the VI day within the Octave of the Nativity, II class.
- 31: Of the VII day within the Octave of the Nativity, II class, Commemoration of St. Sylvester I Pope and Confessor.

The source for the dates above is the Jan. 1960 edition of Acta Apostolicae Sedis.

== Masses for Certain Places (pro Aliquibus Locis) ==
The 1962 typical edition of the Roman Missal—the edition incorporating the changes made for the 1960 General Calendar—collected many (though not all) Mass propers for feasts approved for celebration in certain places in a supplement placed at the end of the Missal; this supplement also incorporated changes mandated by Pope John XXIII regarding the suppression of some local feasts in his 14 February 1961 instruction De calendariis particularibus. Masses listed in this supplement may nowadays be said anywhere on days of the IV class. Some saints listed below are also in the General Calendar above; these saints have proper Masses in the pro Aliquibus Locis supplement that may be said ad libitum in place of the Masses listed in the main body of the Missal.

- 3 January: St. Gaspar del Bufalo Confessor; (Note: Listed as 3 January in 1962 Missals, as that is the nearest day to his date of death (28 December) that is not outranked by the octave of Christmas.) St. Frances Xavier Cabrini Virgin [Transferred to 13 November] (Note: Listed as 3 January in 1962 Missals, as that is the nearest day to her date of death (22 December) that is not outranked by the greater Advent ferias or the octave of Christmas. In places where the Extraordinary Form of the Mass is celebrated, current practice is to transfer this feast to 13 November, the date of her beatification.)
- 23 January: St. Ildephonsus Bishop and Confessor
- 29 January: St. Francis de Sales Bishop, Confessor, and Doctor of the Church [proper Mass]
- 21 February: St. Margaret of Cortona Penitent
- 15 March: St. Louise de Marillac Widow
- 21 March: St. Benedict Abbot [proper Mass]
- 16 April: St. Benedict Joseph Labre Confessor
- 26 April: Our Lady of Good Counsel
- 28 April: St. Peter Chanel Martyr; St. Louis-Marie Grignion de Montfort Confessor
- 29 April: St. Joseph Benedict Cottolengo Confessor
- 3 May: On the Finding of the Holy Cross
- 6 May: St. John Apostle and Evangelist Before the Latin Gate; St. Dominic Savio Confessor
- 8 May: Our Lady, Queen of All Saints and Mother of Fair Love; Our Lady, Mediatrix of All Graces; Our Lady of the Sacred Heart of Jesus; (Note: These three local feast days in honor of the Blessed Virgin Mary were transferred to 8 May from 31 May by decree of Pope John XXIII in De calendariis particularibus due to the insertion into the General Calendar of the feast of the Queenship of Mary (31 May) by Pope Pius XII in 1954.) On the Apparition of St. Michael Archangel
- 15 May: St. Isidore Farmer and Confessor [Observed in some places on 22 March or 25 October]
- 16 May: St. John of Nepomuk Martyr
- 22 May: St. Rita of Cascia Widow
- 23 May: St. John Baptist de Rossi Confessor
- 24 May: Our Lady, Help of Christians
- 30 May: St. Ferdinand King and Confessor; St. Joan of Arc Virgin
- Saturday after the Ascension: Our Lady, Queen of Apostles
- 9 June: Our Lady, Mother of Grace
- 13 June: St. Anthony of Padua Confessor and Doctor of the Church [proper Mass]
- 16 June: St. John Francis Regis Confessor
- 27 June: Our Lady of Perpetual Help; St. Joseph Cafasso Confessor
- 4 July: On the Commemoration of All Holy Popes
- 6 July: St. Maria Goretti Virgin and Martyr
- 9 July: St. Veronica Giuliani Virgin
- 19 July: St. Vincent de Paul Confessor [proper Mass]
- 21 July: St. Lawrence of Brindisi Confessor and Doctor of the Church [proper Mass]
- Saturday before the IV Sunday in July: Our Lady, Mother of Mercy
- 1 August: St. Peter Apostle in Chains
- 3 August: On the Finding of the Body of St. Stephen Protomartyr
- 8 August: St. John Mary Vianney Confessor [proper Mass]
- 11 August: St. Emygdius Bishop and Martyr
- 13 August: Our Lady, Refuge of Sinners
- 16 August: St. Roch Confessor
- 18 August: St. Helena Empress and Widow
- 20 August: St. Bernard Abbot and Doctor of the Church [proper Mass]
- 28 August: St. Augustine Bishop, Confessor, and Doctor of the Church [proper Mass]
- Saturday after the feast of St. Augustine: Our Lady of Consolation
- Saturday before the last Sunday in August: Our Lady, Health of the Sick
- 4 September: Our Lady, Mother of the Divine Shepherd; St. Rose of Viterbo Virgin
- 9 September: St. Peter Claver Confessor
- 15 September: St. Catherine Fieschi Adorno Widow [Observed in some places on 22 March, the date of her conversion]
- 26 September: Ss. Jean, Isaac, and Companions Martyrs
- 1 October: St. Gregory Patriarch of Armenia and Martyr
- 15 October: St. Teresa Virgin [proper Mass]
- 23 October: The Most Holy Redeemer
- 4 November: St. Charles Bishop and Confessor [proper Mass]
- 5 November: On the Holy Relics
- 13 November: St. Stanislaus Kostka Confessor
- Saturday before the III Sunday in November: Our Lady, Mother of Divine Providence
- 24 November: St. John of the Cross Confessor and Doctor of the Church [proper Mass]
- 26 November: St. Leonard of Port Maurice Confessor
- 27 November: Our Lady of the Miraculous Medal
- 7 December: St. Ambrose Bishop, Confessor, and Doctor of the Church [proper Mass]

=== Suppressed Masses ===
In accordance with De calendariis particularibus (par. 32 & 33), the following local feasts "introduced since the Middle Ages by private devotion in the public worship of the Church" were suppressed, unless "truly special reasons" required their continued observance:

- On the Espousals of the Blessed Virgin Mary to St. Joseph (23 January)
- The Flight of Our Lord Jesus Christ into Egypt (17 February)
- The Prayer of Our Lord Jesus Christ (Tuesday after Septuagesima Sunday)
- On the Commemoration of the Passion of Our Lord Jesus Christ (Tuesday after Sexagesima Sunday)
- The Holy Crown of Thorns of Our Lord Jesus Christ (Friday after Ash Wednesday)
- The Holy Lance and Nails of Our Lord Jesus Christ (Friday after the I Sunday in Lent)
- The Holy Shroud of Our Lord Jesus Christ (Friday after the II Sunday in Lent)
- The Five Wounds of Our Lord Jesus Christ (Friday after the III Sunday in Lent)
- The Most Precious Blood of Our Lord Jesus Christ (Friday after the IV Sunday in Lent)
- The Eucharistic Heart of Jesus (Thursday after the [suppressed] octave of Corpus Christi)
- The Humility of the Blessed Virgin Mary (17 July)
- The Purity of the Blessed Virgin Mary (16 October)
- On the Translation of the House of the Blessed Virgin Mary (10 December)
- On the Expectation of the Blessed Virgin Mary (18 December)

In addition, the feast of Saint Philomena (11 August) was removed from all local calendars (save for those of churches named for her and select locations where her cultus was permitted either by indult or tacit approval by the diocesan bishop) due to doubt regarding the historicity of her existence and martyrdom.

== National calendars ==
The following are the proper calendars for certain countries to be used in the celebration of the Roman Rite. National feasts and their ranks have been gathered from liturgical ordos published by various sources, including the FSSP, the Latin Mass Society of England and Wales, and Romanitas Press. This list details only those feasts celebrated in all dioceses and archdioceses of the following countries and does not include feasts proper to specific dioceses and archdioceses.

=== Australia and New Zealand ===
- 1 February: St. Brigid Virgin, II class, Com. of St. Ignatius Bishop and Martyr
- 17 March: St. Patrick Bishop and Confessor, I class
- 28 April: St. Peter Aloysius Mary Chanel Martyr, III class, Com. of St. Paul of the Cross Confessor
- 24 May: Our Lady, Help of Christians, Principal Patroness of Australia and New Zealand, I class
- 9 June: St. Columba Abbot, III class, Com. of Ss. Primus and Felician Martyrs
- 11 July: St. Oliver Plunkett Bishop and Martyr, III class, Com. of St. Pius I Pope and Martyr
- 3 October: St. Teresa Virgin, Principal Patroness of All Missions, I class
- 3 December: St. Francis Xavier Confessor, Principal Patron of All Missions, I class

=== Brazil ===
- 13 February: St. John of Brito Martyr, III class
- 3 May: On the Finding of the Holy Cross, II class, Com. of Ss. Alexander, Eventius and Theodulus Martyrs, and Juvenal Bishop and Confessor
- 13 June: St. Anthony of Padua Confessor and Doctor, II class
- Thursday after Feast of the Sacred Heart: The Eucharistic Heart of Jesus, III class
- 9 July: Our Lady, Queen of Peace, III class
- 15 July: Bl. Inácio de Azevedo and Companions Martyrs, III class, Com. of St. Henry II Emperor and Confessor
- 16 July: Our Lady of Mt. Carmel, III class
- 30 August: St. Rose of Lima Virgin, Principal Patroness of Latin America, I class
- 1 October: Our Lady, Mediatrix of All Graces, III class, Com. of St. Remigius Bishop and Confessor
- 12 October: Our Lady of Aparecida, Principal Patroness of Brazil, I class
- 25 October: St. Anthony of St. Anne Galvão Confessor, III class, Com. of Ss. Chrysanthus and Daria Martyrs
- 5 November: On All Holy Relics in the Churches of Brazil, III class
- 17 November: Ss. Roque Gonzáles and Companion Martyrs, III class, Com. of St. Gregory Thaumaturgus Bishop and Confessor
- 12 December: Our Lady of Guadalupe, Principal Patroness of Latin America, I class

=== Canada ===
- 18 February: St. Mary Bernard Soubirous Virgin, III class
- 19 March: St. Joseph, Spouse of the Blessed Virgin Mary and Confessor, Principal Patron of Canada, I class
- 26 September: Ss. Jean de Brébeuf, Isaac Jogues and Companions Martyrs, Secondary Patrons of Canada, II class, Com. of Ss. Cyprian and Justina Virgin, Martyrs
- 13 November: St. Frances Xavier Cabrini Virgin, III class, Com. of St. Didacus Martyr

=== England and Wales ===
- 1 March: St. David Bishop and Confessor, Principal Patron of Wales, I class (Wales only)
- 12 March: St. Gregory I Pope, Confessor and Doctor of the Church, Apostle to the English, II class (Wales, most dioceses in England)
- 23 April: St. George Martyr, Principal Patron of England, I class (England)/II class (Wales)
- 4 May: The Holy Martyrs of England and Wales, III class, Com. of St. Monica Widow
- 26 May: St. Augustine Bishop and Confessor, II class, Com. of St. Philip Neri Confessor
- II Sunday after Pentecost: External Solemnity of Corpus Christi, II class
- 22 June: St. Alban Martyr, III class, Com. of St. Paulinus Bishop and Confessor
- 9 July: Ss. John Fisher Bishop and Thomas More Martyrs, I class
- 17 July: Our Lady in Porticu, III class (Wales only), Com. of St. Alexius Confessor
- 30 July: Bb. Edward Powell, Richard Featherstone and Companions Martyrs, III class (Wales only), Com. of Ss. Abdon and Sennen, Martyrs
- 3 August: St. Germanus Bishop and Confessor, III class (Wales only)
- 25 September: St. Cadoc Bishop and Martyr, III class (Wales only)
- 13 October: St. Edward King and Confessor, II class
- 5 November: On All Holy Relics in the Churches of Wales, III class (Wales only)
- 29 December: St. Thomas Bishop and Martyr, I class, Com. of the V day within the octave of the Nativity of the Lord

=== France ===
- 3 January: St. Genevieve Virgin, III class (I class in the Archdiocese of Paris)
- 18 February: St. Mary Bernard Soubirous Virgin, III class
- 30 May: St. Joan of Arc Virgin, Secondary Patroness of France, II class
- 3 June: St. Clothilde Queen and Widow, III class
- 1 October: St. Remigius Bishop and Confessor, III class
- 3 October: St. Teresa of the Child Jesus Virgin, Secondary Patroness of France, II class
- 9 October: St. Denis Bishop, Rusticus Priest, and Eleutherius Martyrs, III class, Com. of St. John Leonardi Confessor

=== Korea ===
- 5 July: St. Andrew Kim Taegon Priest and Martyr, I class
- 26 September: CIII Holy Martyrs of Korea, I class
- 3 October: St. Teresa of the Child Jesus Virgin, Principal Patroness of All Missions, I class
- 3 December: St. Francis Xavier Confessor, Principal Patron of All Missions, I class
- 8 December: On the Immaculate Conception of the Blessed Virgin Mary, Principal Patroness of Korea, I class

=== Philippines ===
- 9 January: Jesus of Nazareth of Quiapo, I class
- 3rd Sunday of January: Holy Child of Cebu, I class
- 5 February: XXVI Holy Martyrs of Japan, III class. Com. of St. Agatha Virgin and Martyr
- 3 May: On the Finding of the Holy Cross, II class. Com. of Ss. Alexander, Eventius and Theodulus Martyrs, and Juvenal, Bishop and Confessor
- 15 May: St. Isidore, farmer and confessor, III class. Com. of St. John Baptist de la Salle Confessor
- 19 May: St. Pudentiana Virgin, Secondary Patroness of the Philippines, II class. Com. of St. Peter Celestine Pope and Confessor
- 16 July: Commemoration of Our Lady of Mt. Carmel, II class
- 17 July: On the Triumph of the Holy Cross, II class
- 25 July: St. James, Apostle, II class
- 30 August: St. Rose of Lima Virgin, Secondary Patroness of the Philippines, II class
- 24 September: On the Descent of Our Lady of Mercy, II class
- 28 September: St. Lorenzo Ruiz and Companions, Martyrs, III class. Com. of St. Wenceslaus Duke, Martyr
- 12 October: Our Lady of the Pillar, II class
- 21 October: St. Pedro Calungsod, Martyr, III class. Com. of St. Hilarion Abbot, and St. Ursula and Companions, Martyrs
- 27 November: The Apparition of the Immaculate Virgin Mary of the Miraculous Medal, III class
- 8 December: On the Immaculate Conception of the Blessed Virgin Mary, Principal Patroness of the Philippines, I class
- 12 December: Our Lady of Guadalupe, Heavenly Patroness of the Philippines, I class
- 18 December: Expectation of Our Lady, II class

=== Poland ===
- 15 March: Commemoration of St. Clement Mary Hofbauer Confessor, Comm.
- 23 April: St. Wojciech-Adalbert Bishop and Martyr, Principal Patron of Poland, I class
- 3 May: Our Lady Queen of Poland, Principal Patroness of Poland, I class
- 4 May: St. Florian Martyr, III class, Com. of St. Monica Widow
- 8 May: St. Stanislaus Bishop and Martyr, Principal Patron of Poland, I class
- 16 May: St. Andrew Bobola Priest and Martyr, III class, Com. of St. Ubald Bishop and Confessor
- 24 May: Our Lady Help of Christians, II class
- 30 May: Bl. John Sarkander Priest and Martyr, III class, Com. of St. Felix I Pope and Martyr
- 2 June: Bb. Sadok and Companions Martyrs, III class, Com. of Ss. Marcellinus, Peter, and Erasmus Bishop, Martyrs
- 10 June: Bl. Bogumilus Peter Bishop and Confessor, III class, Com. of St. Margaret Queen and Widow
- 15 June: Bl. Yolanda Widow, III class, Com. of Ss. Vitus, Modestus, and Crescentia Martyrs
- 13 July: Ss. Andrew Zorard and Benedict Confessors, III class
- 15 July: St. Bruno of Querfurt Bishop and Martyr, III class, Com. of St. Henry II Emperor and Confessor
- 18 July: Bl. Szymon of Lipnica Confessor, III class, Com. of Ss. Camillus de Lellis Confessor, Com. of Symphorosa and her seven Sons Martyrs
- 20 July: Bl. Ceslaus Confessor, III class, Com. of Ss. Jerome Emiliani Confessor, Com. of Margaret Virgin and Martyr
- 24 July: Bl. Kinga Virgin, III class, Com. of St. Christina Virgin and Martyr
- 26 August: Our Lady of Częstochowa, I class
- 1 September: Bl. Bronislava Virgin, III class, Com. of St. Giles Abbot, Com. of the Holy Twelve Brothers Martyrs
- 7 September: Bl. Melchior Grodziecki Priest and Martyr, III class
- 25 September: Bl. Ladislaus of Gielniów Confessor, III class
- IV Sunday of September: On the Dedication of the proper church, I class
- 1 October: Bl. John of Dukla Confessor, III class, Com. of St. Remigius Bishop and Confessor
- 9 October: Bl. Wincenty Kadłubek Bishop and Confessor, III class, Com. of St. John Leonard Confessor, Com. of Ss. Denis Bishop, Rusticus Priest, and Eleutherius Martyrs
- 10 October: St. Francis Borgia Confessor, III class, Com. of Victory of Chocim
- 21 October: Bl. Jakub Strzemię Bishop and Confessor, III class, Com. of St. Hilarion Abbot, Com. of Ss. Ursula and Companions Virgins and Martyrs
- 12 November: Ss. Benedict, John, Matthew, Isaac and Krystyn, Protomartyrs of Poland, III class
- 13 November: St. Stanislaus Kostka Confessor, Secondary Patron of Poland, II class, Com. of St. Didacus Confessor
- 17 November: Bl. Salomea Virgin, III class, Com. of St. Gregory Thaumaturgus Bishop and Confessor
- 20 November: St. Martin I Pope and Martyr, III class, (Note: Transferred from the General Calendar date of 12 November) Com. of St. Felix of Valois Confessor
- 2 December: St. Peter Chrysologus Bishop, Confessor, and Doctor of the Church, III class, (Note: Transferred from the General Calendar date of 4 December) Com. of St. Bibiana Virgin and Martyr
- 4 December: St. Barbara Virgin and Martyr, III class

=== Portugal ===
- 16 January: St. Marcellus I Pope and Martyr, III class, Com. of Ss. Berard, Peter, Accursius and Adjutus Martyrs
- 19 January: Commemoration of St. Gonçalo of Amarante Confessor, Com. of Ss. Marius, Martha, Audifax, and Abachum Martyrs
- 4 February: St. John of Brito Martyr, III class, Com. of St. Andrew Corsini Bishop and Confessor
- 13 February: The Five Wounds of Our Lord Jesus Christ, III class
- 18 February: St. Theotonius Confessor, III class, Com. of St. Simeon Bishop and Martyr
- 12 May: Bl. Joana Princess of Portugal, Virgin, III class, Com. of Ss. Nereus, Achilleus, Domitilla Virgin, and Pancras Martyrs
- 13 May: Our Lady of the Rosary of Fátima, II class, Com. of St. Robert Bellarmine Bishop, Confessor, and Doctor of the Church
- 10 June: The Holy Guardian Angel of Portugal, III class, Com. of St. Margaret Queen, Widow
- 13 June: St. Anthony of Lisbon Confessor, Patron of Portugal, I class
- 20 June: Bb. Sancha and Mafalda Princesses of Portugal and Queen of Leon, Widow, Theresa Princess of Portugal, Virgins, III class, Com. of St. Silverius Pope and Martyr
- 15 July: St. Henry II Emperor, Confessor, III class, Com. of Bl. Inácio de Azevedo and Companions Martyrs
- 16 July: Our Lady of Mt. Carmel, III class
- 27 October: Bl. Gonçalo of Lagos Confessor, III class
- 6 November: St. Nuno of St. Mary Confessor, II class
- 8 December: On the Immaculate Conception of the Blessed Virgin Mary, Principal Patroness of Portugal, I class

=== Scotland ===
- 30 November: St. Andrew Apostle, Principal Patron of Scotland, I class
- 14 January: St. Kentigern Bishop and Confessor, III class, Com. of St. Hilary Bishop, Confessor and Doctor of the Church, Com. of St. Felix Priest and Martyr
- 10 March: St. John Ogilvie Martyr, II class, Com. of the Forty Holy Martyrs
- 17 March: St. Patrick Bishop and Confessor, II class
- 9 June: St. Columba Abbot, III class, Com. of Ss. Primus and Felician Martyrs
- 16 September: St. Ninian Bishop and Confessor, III class, Com. of St. Cornelius Pope and St. Cyprian Bishop, Martyrs, Com. of Ss. Euphemia Virgin, Lucy and Geminianus Martyrs
- 16 November: St. Margaret Queen, Secondary Patroness of Scotland, II class, Com. of St. Gertrude Virgin

=== Spain ===
- 27 February: St. Leander Bishop and Confessor, III class, Com. of St. Gabriel of Our Lady of Sorrows
- 10 May: St. John of Ávila Confessor, III class, Com. of St. Antoninus Bishop and Confessor, Com. of Ss. Gordian and Epimachus
- 14 May: St. John Baptist de La Salle Confessor, III class
- 15 May: St. Isidore Farmer and Confessor, III class
- 30 May: St. Ferdinand King and Confessor, III class, Com. of St. Felix I Pope and Martyr
- 16 July: Blessed Virgin Mary of Mt. Carmel, I class
- 25 July: St. James Apostle, Principal Patron of Spain, I class
- 12 October: Our Lady of the Pillar, I class
- 15 October: St. Teresa Virgin, III class
- 8 December: On the Immaculate Conception of the Blessed Virgin Mary, Principal Patroness of Spain, I class

=== United States ===
- 22 January (23 January if 22 January falls on Sunday): Votive Mass for Peace, II class (Note: In places in the United States in which the extraordinary form of the Roman Rite is celebrated, by decree of the United States Conference of Catholic Bishops the Votive Mass for Peace is said in honor of the Day of Prayer for the Legal Protection of Unborn Children for the anniversary of the U.S. Supreme Court decision in Roe v. Wade.)
- II Sunday after Pentecost: External Solemnity of Corpus Christi, II class
- Sunday after 29 June (when 29 June falls on a weekday): External Solemnity of Ss. Peter and Paul Apostles, II class (Note: In years when 1 July (the Feast of the Most Precious Blood, of the I class) falls on Sunday, the External Solemnity of Ss. Peter and Paul is not observed in the United States.)
- I Monday of September (Labor Day): External Solemnity of St. Joseph the Workman, Spouse of the Blessed Virgin Mary, Confessor, II class
- 9 September: St. Peter Claver Confessor, III class, Com. of St. Gorgonius Martyr
- 26 September: Ss. Isaac Jogues, Jean de Brébeuf and Companions Martyrs, III class, Com. of Ss. Cyprian and Justina, Virgin, Martyrs
- II Sunday of October: Votive Mass of the Good Thief, II class in all prisons and reformatories
- 25 October: St. Isidore Farmer and Confessor, III class, Com. of Ss. Chrysanthus and Daria Martyrs
- 13 November: St. Frances Xavier Cabrini Virgin, III class, Com. of St. Didacus Confessor
- 8 December: On the Immaculate Conception of the Blessed Virgin Mary, Principal Patroness of the United States, I class
- 12 December: Our Lady of Guadalupe, Patroness of the Americas, III class

=== Vietnam ===
- First Sunday of September: Ss. Andrew Trần An Dũng-Lạc and Companions Martyrs, I class

== Calendars of traditionalist institutes ==
The following are the proper adaptions currently in use for all members of traditionalist institutes who make exclusive use of the 1961 Breviary and 1962 Missal.

=== Institute of Christ the King Sovereign Priest (ICKSP) ===
- 29 January: St. Francis de Sales, Bishop, Confessor, and Doctor of the Church, Co-principal Patron of the ICKSP, I class
- 7 March: St. Thomas Aquinas, Confessor and Doctor of the Church, Co-principal Patron of the ICKSP, I class
- 21 March: St. Benedict, Abbot, Co-principal Patron of the ICKSP, I class

=== Priestly Fraternity of Saint Peter (FSSP) ===
- 22 February: Chair of St. Peter, Apostle, Principal Patron of the FSSP, I class, Com. of St. Paul
- 7 March: St. Thomas Aquinas, Confessor and Doctor of the Church, Secondary Patron of the FSSP, II class
- 1 August: St. Peter, Apostle, in Chains, III class, Com. of St. Paul, Com. of the Holy Machabees, Martyrs
- 4 November: St. Charles Borromeo, Bishop and Confessor, Patron of Seminarians, I class in all seminaries of the FSSP

=== Society of Saint Pius X (SSPX) ===
- Friday after Passion Sunday: Our Lady of Compassion, I class, Com. of the feria
- 3 September: St. Pius X, Pope and Confessor, Principal Patron of the SSPX, I class
- 15 September: Seven Sorrows of the Blessed Virgin Mary, I class

== Local Calendars ==
To fully comply with the calendar requirements outlined in the 1960 Code of Rubrics that governs the 1962 Missal and the 1961 Breviary, a number of local feasts must be inscribed in the calendars of particular churches where the extraordinary form is offered (and of religious orders and societies dedicated to the use of the sacraments in their 1962 forms) in addition to those listed in the General Calendar and in the national calendars section above. These local feasts include, but are not limited to:

- Feasts of the principal patrons of the nation, the ecclesiastical or civil region or province, and the diocese (I class)
- Anniversary of the dedication of the diocesan cathedral (I class)
- Anniversary of the dedication of the particular church (I class)
- Feast of the titular saint of the particular church or religious order or congregation (I class)
- Feast of the saint-founder of a religious order or congregation (I class)
- Feasts of the secondary patrons of the nation, the ecclesiastical or civil region or province, and the diocese (II class)
- Feasts of certain saints proper to a particular church or region (e.g., a saint whose body is preserved in a particular church) (II class)
- Feast of the beatified founder of a religious order or congregation (II class)
- Feasts of certain saints with some particular significance for a particular place, town, city, or region (e.g., a saint who was born in, had prolonged residence in, or died in a given place, town, city, or region) (II or III class or commemoration)
- Other proper feasts inscribed in the local calendar of the diocese (III class or commemoration)

== See also ==
- Namesdays
- Moveable feast
- List of saints
- General Roman Calendar
- Tridentine calendar
- General Roman Calendar of 1954
- General Roman Calendar of Pope Pius XII
- General Roman Calendar of 1969
