= Claudio Cipolla =

Italian bishop of the Catholic Church

His Eminence Claudio Cipolla
- Monsignor; Bishop of Padua
- Native name: Claudio Cipolla
- Church: Roman Catholic Church
- Province: Padua
- Metropolis: Patriarchate of Venezia
- Diocese: Roman Catholic Diocese of Padua
- See: Padua
- Elected: 18 October 2015
- Predecessor: Antonio Mattiazzo
- Other posts: Parish Vicar of the Parish of Ognissanti, in Mantua^{(1980–1989)} Assistant of the Explorers Club and Guides of the AGESCI^{(1988–1990)} Parish Vicar of the Parish of the Assumption of the Blessed Virgin Mary, in Medole^{(1989–1990)} Provincial Assistant of the AGESCI^{(1989–1992)} Director of Caritas Diocesana^{(1990–2008)} Parish priest of Sant'Antonio di Porto Mantovano^{(1998–2015)} Episcopal Vicar for the Pastoral Sector^{(2008–2015)}

Orders
- Ordination: 24 May 1980 by Bishop Carlo Ferrari
- Consecration: 27 September 2015 by Bishop Roberto Busti
- Rank: Bishop-Priest

Personal details
- Born: Claudio Cipolla; 11 February 1955 (age 71) Goito, Province of Mantua, Italy
- Denomination: Roman Catholic
- Residence: Padua
- Education: Episcopal Seminary of Mantua
- Motto: Confide Surge Vocat Te^{Latin} Trust, Rise He calls you^{English}
- Coat of arms: Claudio Cipolla's coat of arms

Styles of Claudio Cipolla
- Reference style: His Eminence
- Spoken style: Your Eminence
- Religious style: Monsignor
- Informal style: Cardinal

Ordination history of Claudio Cipolla
History
Priestly ordination
- Ordained by: Bishop Carlo Ferrari
Episcopal consecration
- Principal consecrator: Bishop Roberto Busti
- Co-consecrators: Patriarch Francesco Moraglia, Bishop Egidio Caporello, Bishop Nunzio Galantino
Episcopal succession
Bishops consecrated by Claudio Cipolla as principal consecrator
- Renato Marangoni: April 10, 2016

Claudio Cipolla (born 11 February 1955, in Goito) is an Italian bishop of the Catholic Church. He has been Bishop of Padua since 18 October 2015.

== Biography ==
Cipolla was ordained priest in the Diocese of Mantua on 24 May 1980.

When he was appointed Bishop of Padua, Cipolla was pastor in Porto Mantovano and episcopal vicar of the Diocese of Mantua.

He was a scout leader and assistant of the Association of Italian Catholic Guides and Scouts.

He was ordained bishop on 27 September 2015 and consequently installed in Padua on 18 October 2015.

Catholic Church titles
Preceded by Antonio Mattiazzo	Bishop of Padua; 2015–	Succeeded by
