= Giorgio Cornaro (disambiguation) =

Giorgio Cornaro may refer to:

- Giorgio Cornaro (1374–1439), the grandson of Marco Cornaro, doge of Venice, the grandfather of Catherine Cornaro, queen of Chypre
- Giorgio Cornaro (1452–1527), the former's grandson, the great-great-grandson of Marco Cornaro, doge of Venice and the brother of Catherine Cornaro, queen of Chypre
- Giorgio Cornaro (1517–1570), grandson of the former, portrayed by Titian in 1538
- Giorgio Cornaro (bishop of Padua) (1613–1663), Italian Roman Catholic bishop
- Giorgio Cornaro (bishop of Treviso) (1524–1578), Italian Roman Catholic bishop
- Giorgio Cornaro (cardinal) (1658–1722), Italian cardinal
- Portrait of a Man with a Falcon, c. 1537 portrait by Titian
