= Bellinus of Padua =

Italian Roman Catholic saint

Saint Bellino Bertaldo
- Bishop of Padua
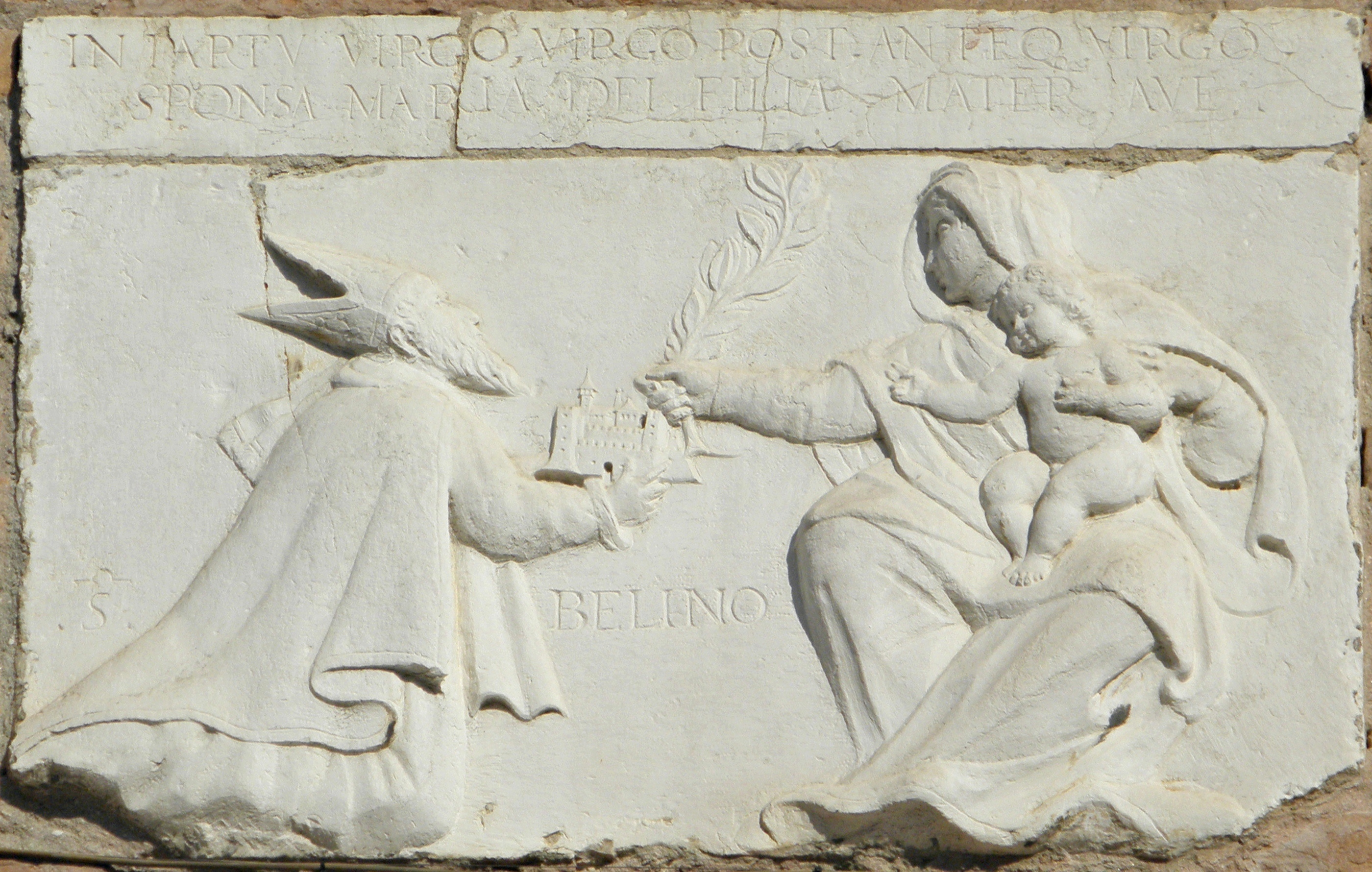
- Church: Roman Catholic Church
- Diocese: Padua
- See: Padua
- Appointed: 1128
- Term ended: 26 November 1145
- Predecessor: Sinibaldo
- Successor: Giovanni Cacio

Orders
- Consecration: c. 1128

Personal details
- Born: Bellino Bertaldo Padua
- Died: 26 November 1145 Fratta, Rovigo, Republic of Venice

Sainthood
- Feast day: 26 November
- Venerated in: Roman Catholic Church
- Canonized: by Pope Eugene IV
- Attributes: Episcopal attire; Dog at his feet; Palm; Keys
- Patronage: Adria; Diocese of Adria; Against dog bites; Against rabies

Bellino Bertaldo (Venetian: San Bełin de Sasonia) (d. 26 November 1145) was an Italian Roman Catholic prelate who served as the Bishop of Padua from 1128 until his murder. Pope Eugene IV later canonized Bellino as a saint.

== Biography ==
Bellino was born into the noble Bertaldi house in Padua.

Bellino opposed his bishop Milone because the latter adhered to Antipope Clement III but he remained dedicated to the legitimate popes during Milone's episcopal tenure. But he would support Bishop Sinibaldo, since he remained dedicated to Pope Paschal II rather than the antipope. Bellino later embarked in 1144, on a pilgrimage to Rome to meet Pope Celestine II, who was impressed upon meeting him that he named Bellino as the new Bishop of Padua. He defended the Church from secular threats and supported ecclesial rights and also led a reform for the diocesan canons and an effort to rebuild the cathedral after its destruction in an earthquake in 1117. He also oversaw the construction of schools.

He was travelling in a forest at Fratta (near Rovigo) en route to Rome when assassins stabbed him to death; the Capodivacca house hired these assassins to kill him for reasons unknown. Bellino's remains were housed in Lugarano at the church of San Giacomo but a flood prompted his relics to be moved to the new church of San Bellino in San Martino di Variano. The relics were moved into a chapel in the same church later in 1647.
