= San Tommaso in Parione =

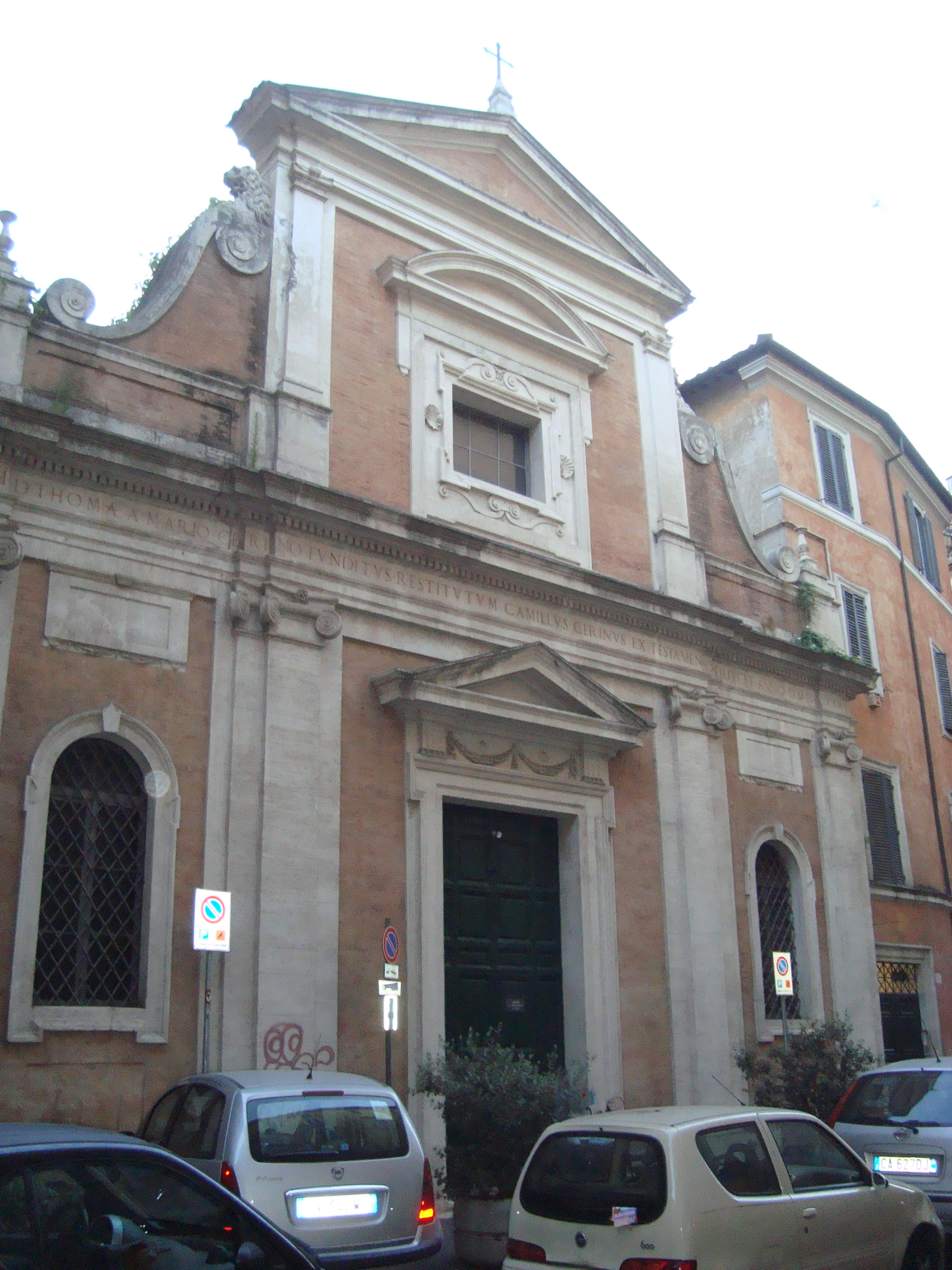
- Facade
- Click on the map for a fullscreen view
- 41°53′55″N 12°28′14″E
- Location: 33 Via Parione; 00186 Roma
- Denomination: Roman and Ethiopian Coptic

History
- Status: national church
- Dedication: Thomas the Apostle
- Consecrated: Reconsecrated 1139

Architecture
- Architectural type: Church
- Years built: Ancient, rebuilt 1582

Clergy
- Pastor: Ethiopian clergy

San Tommaso in Parione is one of the two national churches of Eritrea in Rome. It is dedicated to St Thomas the Apostle. The church is normally open to the public every Sunday .

== History ==
The church has ancient origins, but the first documented date is 1139, when Pope Innocent II consecrated it. It seems certain that this was a reconsecration after a rebuilding or enlargement of the church. The dedication epigraph with the list of relics granted is still walled to the right of the entrance.

In 1449, Pope Nicholas V granted the church to the Company of Scriptors and Copyists of the Curia. It was made a titular church in 1517. St Philip Neri was ordained to the priesthood in the church in 1551. The present church is the result of a rebuilding in 1582. It was built to a design by Francesco Volterra by Mario and Camillo Cerrini. In 1639, Gian Lorenzo Bernini was married here. A "St. Thomas touching Jesus' side" and other paintings were stolen by the French during the occupation that followed the events of the Roman Republic.

The church lost its titular status in 1937 due to the state of disrepair. The title was transferred to Chiesa Nuova. The church is served by the Cistercian Order. At the request of priests and the rector of the Pontifical Ethiopian College, San Tommaso al Parione was made available for the communities of Ethiopians and Eritreans. Mass is celebrated in both the Alexandrine (Coptic) rite and in Ghe'ez.

== Architecture ==
The 16th century brick façade was designed by Jacopo del Duca. It has two stories, with the lower divided into three sections. The middle section has a doorway crowned by a triangular tympanon, and the outer sections have windows. On the upper level is a central window crowned by a rounded tympanon. The middle section is crowned by a tympanon; the outer sections consist only of volutes.

The nave has three aisles separated by pilasters with Ionic capitals. The nave has a visible tile roof, while the outer aisles have plaster ceilings. The high altar, set against the apse wall, has two marble columns on the sides and is crowned by a tympanon. The 17th century altarpiece depicts St Thomas. On the sides are paintings of Cardinal Gregorio Barbarigo and St Philip Neri. The former was Cardinal-titular of this church, while the latter was ordained in this church.

On the left wall are frescoes from the pontificate of Innocent II (1130–1143). One of them depicts St Martin of Tours Dividing his Cloak. There are also paintings from the 19th century, of which The Annunciation by Giuseppe Passeri is the most notable. The church is in need of some restoration.

== Cardinal deacons ==
- Girolamo Doria (1529-1555)
