= Fidentius Armenus =

Second century saint

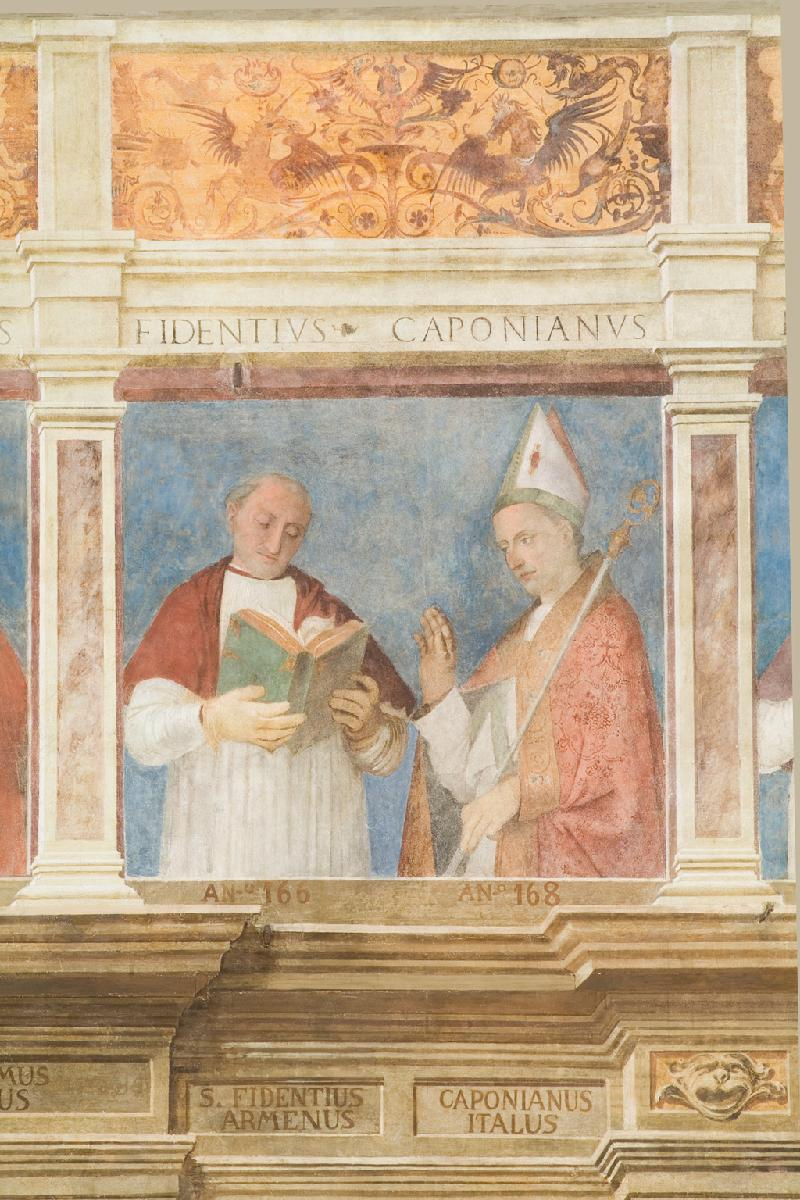
Fidentius (left) beside Bishop Caponianus in a mural by Bartolomeo Montagna in the episcopal palace in Padua (1505–06)

Fidentius Armenus (Italian: Fidenzio Armeno), also called Fidentius of Padua (Italian: Fidenzio di Padova), was a saint whose cultus was kept at Padua in the Middle Ages. His feast day is on 16 November. Nothing is known about him. He is traditionally dated to the second century and considered a martyr. According to some late hagiography, he was killed in the seventh year of Marcus Aurelius (168). His nickname implies that he was Armenian.

When Baronius revised the Roman Martyrology (1586), he listed Fidentius as a bishop of Padua. He was removed from the Martyrology in 2004. In his chronology of the bishops of Padua, Nicolò Antonio Giustinian listed him third from 166 until 168.
