= Gregorio Barbarigo =

Italian Roman Catholic saint

Saint Gregorio Barbarigo
- Bishop of Padua
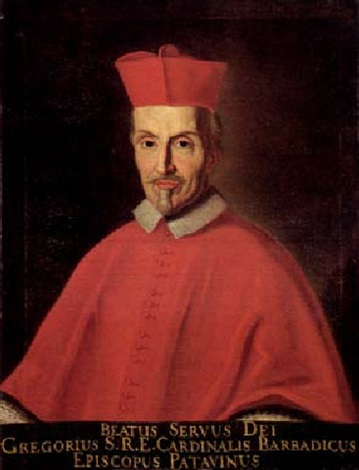
- Gregorio Barbarigo by Ermanno Stroiffi
- Church: Roman Catholic Church
- See: Padua
- Appointed: 24 March 1664
- Installed: 24 April 1664
- Term ended: 18 June 1697
- Predecessor: Giorgio Corner
- Successor: Giorgio Cornaro
- Other post: Cardinal-Priest of San Marco (1677-97)
- Previous posts: Bishop of Bergamo (1657-64); Cardinal-Priest of San Tommaso in Parione (1660-77)

Orders
- Ordination: 21 December 1655 by Gianfrancesco Morosini
- Consecration: 29 July 1657 by Marcantonio Bragadin
- Created cardinal: 5 April 1660 by Pope Alexander VII
- Rank: Cardinal-Priest

Personal details
- Born: Gregorio Giovanni Gaspare Barbarigo; 16 September 1625 Venice, Republic of Venice
- Died: 18 June 1697 (aged 71) Padua, Republic of Venice

Sainthood
- Feast day: 17 June General Roman Calendar of 1960; 18 June General Roman Calendar
- Venerated in: Roman Catholic Church
- Beatified: 6 July 1761; Saint Peter's Basilica, Papal States by Pope Clement XIII
- Canonized: 26 May 1960; Saint Peter's Basilica, Vatican City by Pope John XXIII
- Attributes: Cardinal's attire; Crucifix
- Patronage: Diocese of Bergamo; Diocese of Padua

Ordination history of Gregorio Barbarigo
History
Priestly ordination
- Ordained by: Gianfrancesco Morosoni
- Date: 21 December 1655
Episcopal consecration
- Consecrated by: Marcantonio Bragadin
- Date: 29 July 1657
- Place: Quirinale Palace, Rome, Papal States
Cardinalate
- Elevated by: Pope Alexander VII
- Date: 5 April 1660
Episcopal succession
Bishops consecrated by Gregorio Barbarigo as principal consecrator
- Niels Stensen: 19 September 1677
- Marcantonio Barbarigo: 26 June 1678
- Carlo Felice de Matta: 26 June 1678
- Marcantonio Zollio: 21 August 1678
- Gherardo Gherardi: 16 April 1679
- Gianalberto Badoaro: 20 November 1688

Gregorio Giovanni Gaspare Barbarigo (16 September 1625 – 18 June 1697) was an Italian cardinal and is venerated as a saint of the Roman Catholic Church. He served as the Bishop of Bergamo and later as the Bishop of Padua. Barbarigo was a frontrunner in both the 1689 and 1691 papal conclaves as he had distinguished himself for his diplomatic and scholastic service. He became noted as a scholar for his distinguished learning and as an able pastor for his careful attention to pastoral initiatives and frequent parish visitations.

Barbarigo's beatification was celebrated in 1761 under Pope Clement XIII, while Pope John XXIII canonized the late cardinal in 1960; the latter pope held Barbarigo as a great role model and fostered a devotion to him since the pope had hailed from Bergamo. His liturgical feast is on 17 June in the General Roman Calendar of 1960. On the General Roman Calendar of 1969, it is observed on 18 June.

== Life ==
=== Childhood and education ===
Gregorio Giovanni Gaspare Barbarigo was born on 16 September 1625 in Venice as the eldest of four children to the nobles Giovanni Francesco Barbarigo (a senator) and Lucrezia Leoni (d. 19 March 1631 - plague). His father brought a cousin - Franchesina Lippomani - to look after the children after the death of his wife. His sister was Elena and his two brothers were Pietro and Antonio. He was a relative of the cardinal Marcantonio Barbarigo and the uncle of Cardinal Giovanni Francesco Barbarigo. He was also a relation of Cardinal Angelo Barbarigo. His ancestors included the two Venetian doges Marco Barbarigo and Agostino Barbarigo. His father instructed him in philosophical studies and in mathematics while preceptors taught him Latin and Greek; he also received the rudiments of music.

In 1643, he accompanied as secretary the Venetian ambassador Aloise Contarini to Münster for the negotiations to prepare for the Peace of Westphalia which was signed on 24 October 1648. There, he became acquainted with Archbishop Fabio Chigi (the future Pope Alexander VII) - the nuncio to Cologne and a participant in the negotiations.

He then went to Holland and Flanders and then to Paris. In July 1648, he returned to Venice and continued his studies in Padua.

In 1650, he was elected as a member of the Collegio dei Savi and initiated his political career which he did not find to be good for him. In the winter, in 1653, he went to Rome to ask the advice of Cardinal Chigi who recommended that he not retire as a hermit but follow the ecclesiastical career and begin obtaining a doctorate in law.

=== Priesthood and Bishop of Bergamo ===
Barbarigo obtained a doctorate in "utroque iure" both canon law and civil law on 25 September 1655 and received his ordination to the priesthood on 21 December 1655 from the Cardinal Patriarch of Venice Gianfrancesco Morosini. He left for Rome in late February 1656 for Chigi - now Pope Alexander VII - initiated him into the papal service. He was named a domestic prelate of His Holiness and on 21 April 1656, was appointed as the Referendary of the Tribunals of the Apostolic Signature of Justice and of Grace. On 9 June 1665, he was given a canonicate in the cathedral chapter of Padua without the requirement of residence and in 1656, at the request of the pope, he organized the assistance to the Romans in the Trastevere area who had been stricken with the plague. He oversaw the care of the mothers and their children and the funerals of the deceased in this work. He nursed the sick, buried the dead, and comforted those frightened and in mourning.

On 9 July 1657, the pope appointed him as Bishop of Bergamo and he received his episcopal consecration as such on 29 July 1657 from Marcantonio Bragadin. But before he accepted the post, he decided to celebrate a Mass to discern the will of God when he felt the concrete call to take on the see during the Mass. Barbarigo took possession of his new episcopal see on 2 September through his procurators Rodolfo Roncalli the archdeacon and the vice-capitular Giovanni Battista Lavezzali while he himself arrived there on 27 March 1658. He inspected each of the 279 parishes of the diocese.

=== Cardinalate ===
He was a successful bishop and his fame spread through the ranks so much to the point that his old friend Alexander VII elevated him to the cardinalate on 5 April 1660 at the Quirinale Palace. He was made the Cardinal-Priest of San Tommaso in Parione on 21 June 1660 but later opted to become the Cardinal-Priest of San Marco on 13 September 1677.

In 1664, he was made Bishop of Padua and upon entrance into his new diocese he strove to model himself upon the example of Charles Borromeo. His procurator the Archpriest Galeazzo Mussato took possession of the see on Barbarigo's behalf on 24 April, before the cardinal entered the see on 22 June. He was a strong supporter of the work of the Council of Trent. He made the seminaries of Padua and of Bergamo larger and added an archive and printing press in Padua. He celebrated a diocesan synod from 1–3 September 1683 and wrote the "Regulae Studiorum" in 1690 for ecclesial studies. He also visited all 320 parishes in his diocese.

The cardinal soon learned in 1678 that Elena Cornaro Piscopia was pursuing a theological course and he refused this on the basis that she was a woman. But he allowed for her to obtain a philosophical degree, which she did.

In his role as a cardinal he participated in his first papal conclave in 1667 and also attended those in 1676 and that of 1689 when he emerged as a potential contender though falling short of the votes needed to become pope. The same was said for 1691 which saw him emerge as a greater threat to other contenders. He did not attend the 1669-70 conclave. The election of Pope Innocent XI in 1676 saw the pope ask Barbarigo to remain in Rome until 1679 as his counselor and entrusted Rome's education to him and the reunification of the Eastern Churches. One of his episcopal acts was to consecrate as a bishop Niels Stensen on 19 September 1677 and he also ordained the convert Thomas Nicholson a priest in Padua.

In the 1689 conclave, his candidature received little support from his compatriots with Cardinal Flavio Chigi not supporting his candidature. Cardinal Francesco Maria de' Medici had put his name forth as per an elaborate ruse with the intent of never having Barbarigo elected. Medici's aim was to indeed have a Venetian elected but decided to settle on Pietro Vito Ottoboni who was elected as Pope Alexander VIII. But the 1691 conclave shifted Barbarigo's status as a potential contender for he gained greater ground and almost succeeded in becoming pope. Cardinal d'Estrées included him in his list of potential candidates in light of the impending death of Alexander VIII while Cardinal Leandro Colloredo decided to throw his support behind Barbarigo. Even Chigi - who had blocked his candidature back in 1689 - thought well to advocate Barbarigo's name. But the French were not all that enthralled with Barbarigo since he was considered a leading 'creature' of Alexander VII who had not been too lenient with the French. Cardinals Pietro Ottoboni and Paluzzo Paluzzi Altieri were opposed to his candidature and in the end was elected Antonio Pignatelli as Pope Innocent XII.

Cardinal Barbarigo fostered catechetical instruction and he travelled to each village in his diocese in order to teach and to preach to the people. His compassion to the poor was well known for he gave his household goods and his clothes to the poor for their comfort. He even sold his bed on one occasion to help them.

Barbarigo died after a brief illness on 18 June 1697 in Padua where he was interred in the diocesan cathedral.

== Veneration ==
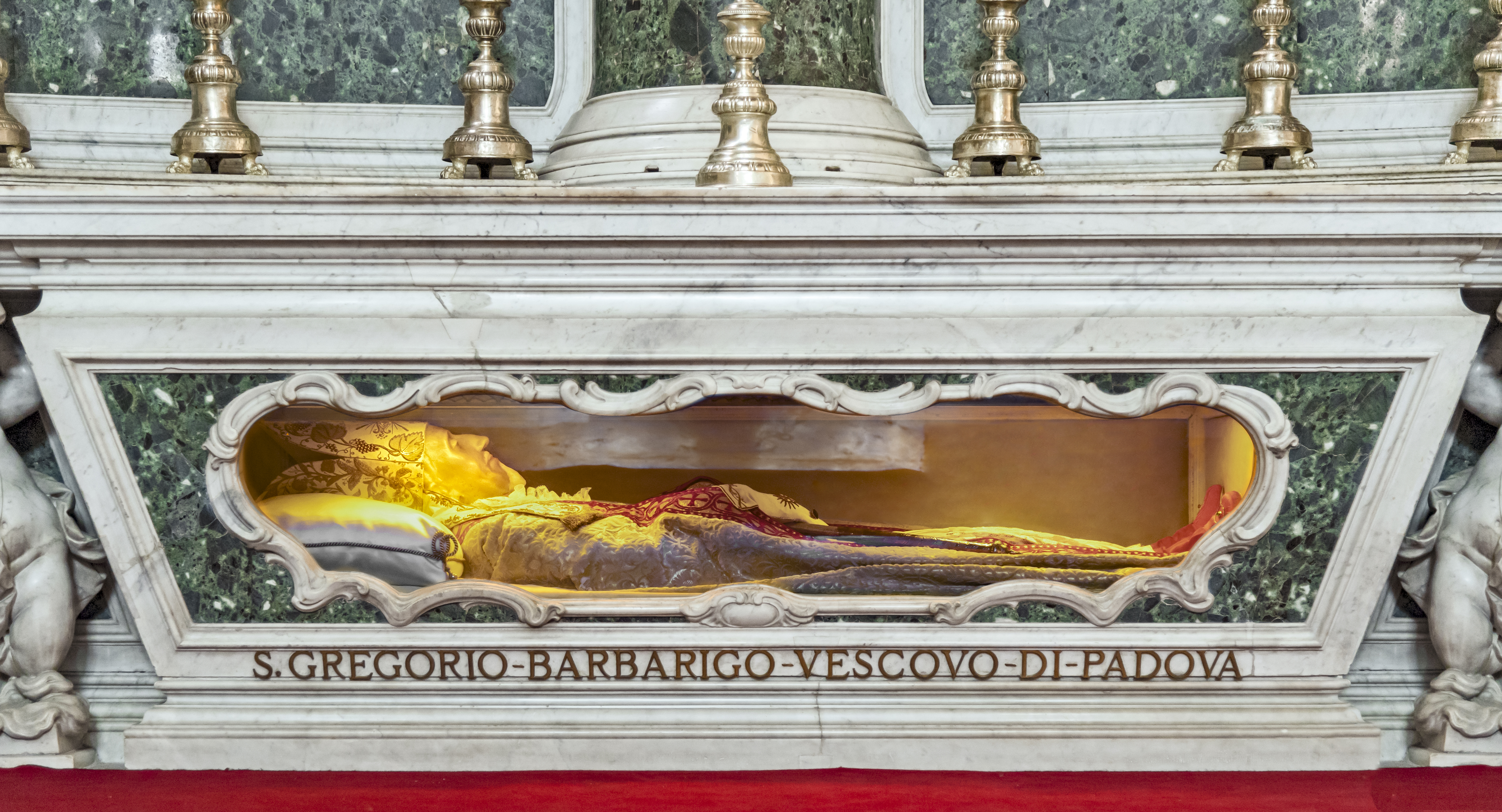
Tomb in Padua.

Bishop Barbarigo was distinguished by his piety and heroic patience and miracles quickly bore witness to his sanctity. His holiness was observed in his life enough to the point that the faithful started to press the competent ecclesial authorities to launch the process for sainthood with the informative phase of the investigation ending on 11 July 1716; the formal introduction to the cause came under Pope Innocent XIII on 3 July 1723.

His remains were exhumed on 25 May 1725 and allegedly found to be incorrupt with his nephew Bishop Giovanni Francesco Barbarigo leading the exhumation initiative. However, the report of the examining physicians was actually equivocal. While medical professionalism prevented them form saying the body was incorrupt, popular opinion and ecclesiastical expectations were otherwise. The report stated that the condition of the body was "wondrous" which fell short of miraculous, a distinction largely lost upon those interested. Pope Benedict XIV beatified Barbarigo on 20 September 1751. The future Pope John XXIII, while still only a priest, signed a petition in 1911 addressed to Pope Pius X requesting Barbarigo's cause go forward for the late cardinal to become a saint; Pius X did so on 28 February 1912 when he issued the decree to resume the cause.

John XXIII is said to have felt a close kinship with the late cardinal and was also said to have manifested a lifelong devotion to him and his work as a model and so included him in the General Roman Calendar of 1960 while assigning 17 June as the liturgical feast since 18 June was assigned to another. But the 1969 revision to the calendar saw the removal of his name which left his feast to a celebration in local calendars. His liturgical feast remains affixed at present to 18 June.

The Church of San Gregorio Barbarigo alle Tre Fontane in Rome is dedicated to him.

Catholic Church titles
Preceded by Luigi Grimani	Bishop of Bergamo; 1657–1664	Succeeded by Daniele Giustiniani
Preceded by Pietro Campori	Cardinal-Priest of San Tommaso in Parione; 1660–1677	Succeeded by Bandino Panciatici
Preceded by Giorgio Cornaro	Bishop of Padua; 1664–1697	Succeeded by Giorgio Cornaro
Preceded by Pietro Vito Ottoboni	Cardinal-Priest of San Marco; 1677–1697	Succeeded by Marcantonio Barbarigo
