= Diocese of Padua =

Roman Catholic diocese in Italy

Coordinates: 45.4167°N 11.8667°E

Diocese of Padua Dioecesis Patavina Diocesi di Padova

Catholic
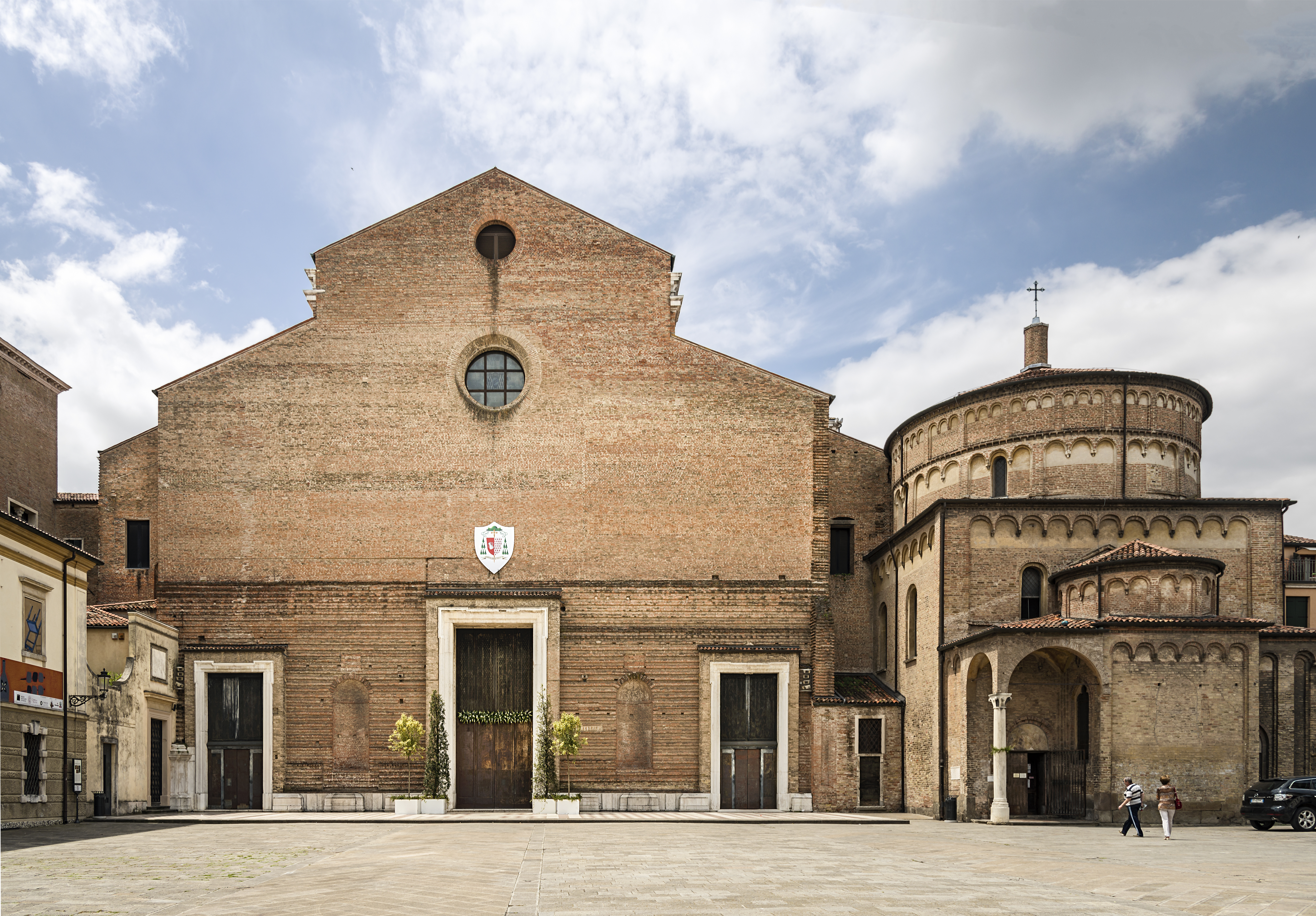
- Padua Cathedral

Location
- Country: Italy

Statistics
- Area: 3,297 km^{2} (1,273 sq mi)
- Population: Total; Catholics: (as of 2023); 1,081,808 ▲; 1,031,636 ▲
- Parishes: 459

Information
- Rite: Roman
- Established: 3rd Century
- Cathedral: Basilica Cattedrale di S. Maria
- Secular priests: 627 (diocesan) ▼231 ▼ (religious orders); 55 Permanent Deacons ▲

Current leadership
- Pope: Leo XIV
- Bishop: Claudio Cipolla
- Bishops emeritus: Antonio Mattiazzo

Map

Website
- www.diocesipadova.it (in Italian)

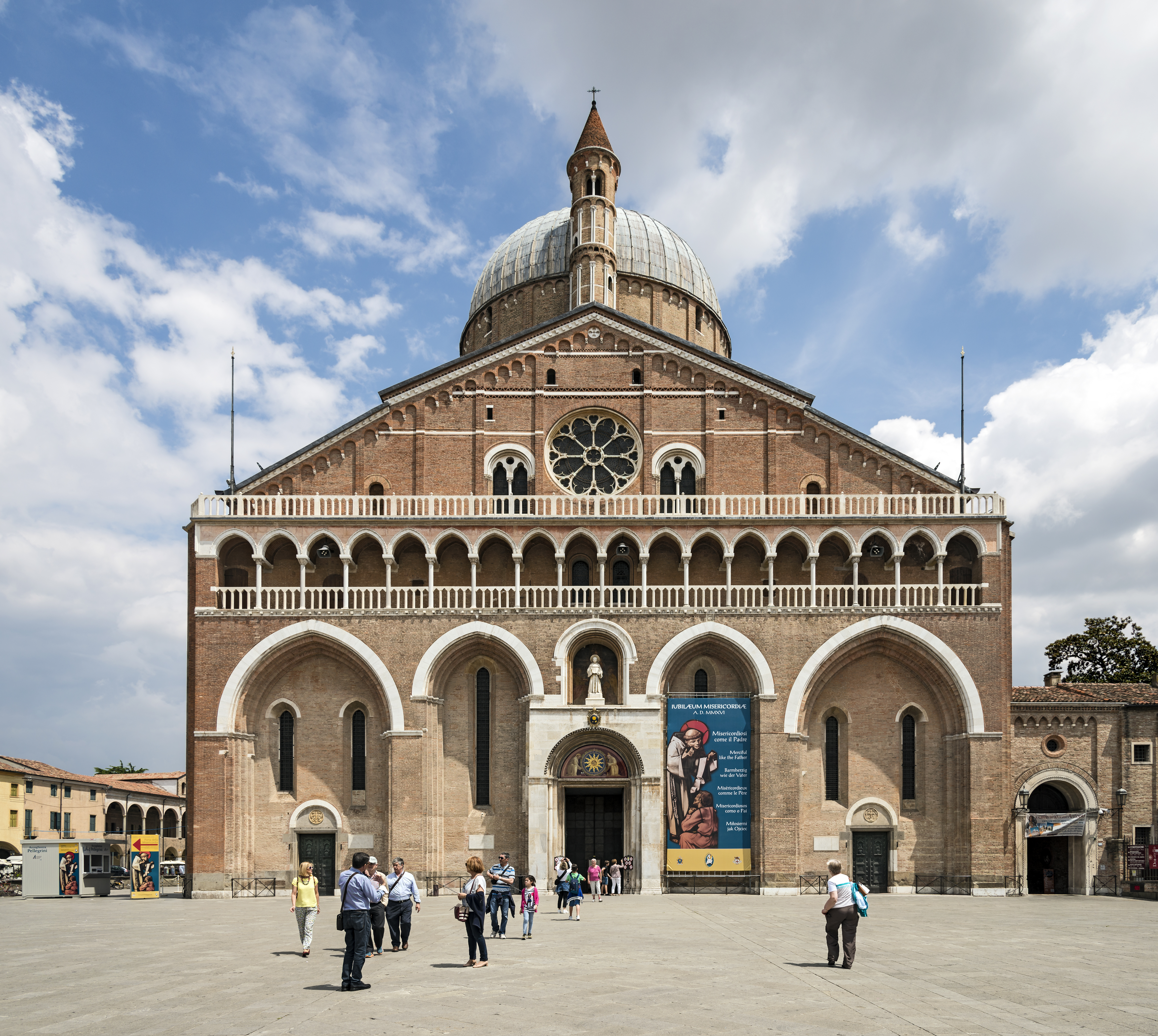
Basilica of Saint Anthony of Padua (Padua)

The Diocese of Padua (Italian: Diocesi di Padova; Latin: Dioecesis Patavina) is a Latin diocese of the Catholic Church in Veneto, northern Italy. It was erected in the 3rd century. The diocese of Padua was originally a suffragan (subordinate) of the Patriarchate of Aquileia. When the Patriarchate was suppressed permanently in 1752, it became a suffragan of the Archdiocese of Udine. In 1818, when the dioceses of northern Italy were reorganized by Pope Pius VII, it became a suffragan of the Patriarchate of Venice, and remains so today.

The current bishop is Claudio Cipolla.

The seat of the bishop of Padua is in the Cathedral-Basilica of Santa Maria Assunta. The diocese also contains the Basilica of Saint Anthony of Padua and the Basilica of Santa Giustina.

== Territory ==
The Diocese of Padua covers the most part of the Province of Padua, out of a main part of the higher plain. It also includes areas from the surrounding provinces of Vicenza (Thiene, Asiago and Plateau of the Sette Comuni, Monte Grappa, southern Valsugana), Venice (Riviera del Brenta), Treviso (Valdobbiadene) and Belluno (Quero).

== History ==
In a manuscript of the 14th century, containing a list of the bishops of Padua, the statement is made that Prosdocimus, a disciple of S. Peter the Apostle, was sent to Pavia in 42, and that he died in the reign of Antoninus Pius (138–160). He baptized Vitalianus, the king of Padua, his wife, and the whole people of Padua (Padua was actually a municipium under the Lex Julia Municipalis). During his episcopate, Duke Andrea Dandolo of Venice came to Padua. Justina (Giustina), the daughter of Vitalianus was driven out and killed. All this information, as Francesco Lanzoni points out, derives from the hagiographical fiction, the "Life of S. Prosdocimus", which is not older than the 12th century. Of his thirty successors in the episcopal list, only two have any external documentation at all, and those two are given in the wrong order in the list. The legendary Fidentius Armenus, supposed third bishop, was venerated as a martyr.

In 1148, following the murder of Bishop Bellino, the Abbot of S. Giustina for the first time joined the Chapter of the cathedral in the election of bishops. Perhaps also the Primicerius of the Parocchi was given the same privilege. They elected Giovanni Caccio, who was confirmed by the Patriarch of Aquileia, and was in office by 29 July 1148.

=== Troubled election of 1283 ===
Following the death of Bishop Joannes Forzate on 4 June 1283, the Canons attempted to gather for an electoral meeting. Trouble began when the Primicerius complained about his right to take part in the election along with the Archpriest and the Canons, and that he had not been summoned to the meeting. On 24 July 1283, he announced his intention to appeal to the pope. Several days later, the Canons assembled again and elected Prosavio, who was then Bishop of Treviso. But he refused the election. On 1 August 1283, another meeting took place with the Archpriest Bovetinus presiding. Five of the Canons voted for Canon Prencevalle di Bonifaccio Conti (Percevalle), while the other five voted for Giovanni dagli Abbati. Five other electors made no nomination. Those who had voted for Giovanni dagli Abbati declared him elected and sought his consent, which was given; they prepared a certificate of election which was to be given to the Patriarch of Aquileia for his approval and canonical institution. Giovanni dagli Abbati requested time to consider his response. The supporters of Prencevalle did the same, and the conflict ended up in the court of the Patriarch, where it was heard in March 1284.

Cardinal Latinus Frangipani Malabranca, the Bishop of Ostia and nephew of Pope Nicholas III (1277–1280), who was papal Legate in the Romandiola, declared that Giovanni dagli Abbati had no right to be considered for election, based on information provided to the effect that Giovanni was a simoniac, living in concubinage, and was a source of scandal.

The Patriarch was prepared to rule in favor of Giovanni, who by that time had two-thirds of the electors on his side, but heavy pressure was applied by the family and friends of Prencevalle, and the Patriarch therefore quashed the entire election. He then, on his own initiative as Metropolitan, provided (appointed) a new bishop, who was Prencevalle, despite the fact that Prencevalle was only in minor orders and required a papal dispensation to be elected bishop. The entire affair was appealed to the Holy See. Despite the appeal, the Patriarch went ahead and consecrated Prencevalle and had him installed as Bishop of Padua.

On 1 July 1286, Pope Honorius IV issued a mandate to the Bishop of Castello, Bartolomeo Quirini, to suspend Prencevalle from the spiritual and temporal administration of the diocese of Padua, and to confiscate all the fruits and other income which he had received from the time of his provision in March 1284. Quirini was ordered to cite Prencevalle to appear at the papal court within six weeks. The Pope appointed Apostolic Administrators for the diocese of Padua, the Archpriest and Canon Andrea Gausoni. Prencevalle failed to appear before the pope, and therefore the Bishop of Castello proceeded against him. Eventually Prencevalle submitted his resignation.

On 4 March 1287, Pope Honorius IV appointed Bernardus, a canon of Agde (France) and an auditor causarum (judge) in the papal court, as the new bishop of Padua.

=== Pileo di Prato ===
Bishop Pietro Pileo di Prato of the diocese of Treviso was appointed bishop of Padua by Pope Innocent VI on 12 June 1359. As bishop, he summoned and presided over a diocesan synod on 8 March 1360. At exactly the same time he was involved in his capacity as Grand Chancellor of the University of Padua, in mediating a dispute between the Law Faculty and the Arts Faculty, as to whether there should be one university or two. On 20 March 1360, he issued his decision, that there should be two institutions, but that the Rector of the Arts should swear to obey the statutes of the Law Faculty. In 1361, he modified the statutes of the cathedral Chapter, allowing younger Canons who were studying at the university to do so without penalty for their absence from their cathedra duties. Bishop Pileo also obtained from Pope Urban V a chair in theology for the University of Padua, only the third such chair to be established, after Paris and Bologna. In 1394, he founded the Collegio Pratense in Padua, for the benefit of scholars studying at the University of Padua, and provided for the institution in his Testament of 1399.

In 1348, Padua, like most large cities in Italy, was attacked by the bubonic plague. A Paduan chronicler reports that scarcely one-third of the population survived the onslaught. In 1382, another major visitation of the plague took place. It began apparently in Friuli, then spread to Belluno, Feltre, Treviso and Venice (where 20,000 people died between May and November 1382). Finally Padua and the Romandiola suffered. All of the monks in S. Maria dell' Alto in Monselice died.

In 1594, the Chapter of the cathedral of the Assumption was composed of four dignities and twenty-two Canons.

=== Reorganization ===
In 1751, pressured both by Austria and Venice, who were exasperated by the numerous discords in the patriarchate of Aquileia, Pope Benedict XIV was compelled to intervene in the ecclesiastical and political disturbances. In the bull "Injuncta Nobis" of 6 July 1751, the patriarchate of Aquileia was completely suppressed, and in its place the Pope created two separate archdioceses, Udine and Goritza. The dioceses which had been suffragans of Aquileia and were under Venetian political control, Padua among them, were assigned to the new archdiocese of Udine.

=== Post-Napoleonic reorganization ===
The violent expansionist military policies of the French First Republic had brought confusion and dislocation to the Po Valley. Following the redistribution of European territories at the Congress of Vienna, the Papacy faced the difficult task of restoring and restructuring the Church in various territories, according to the wishes of their rulers. Padua and Venice were under the control of the Austrian Empire, and therefore a Concordat had to be negotiated with the government of Francis I of Austria. One of the requirements of the Austrian government was the elimination of several metropolitanates and the suppression of a number of bishoprics which were no longer viable due to the bad climate (malaria and cholera) and the impoverishment of the dioceses due to migration and industrialization; it was expected that this would be done to the benefit of the Patriarchate of Venice.

Pope Pius VII, therefore, issued the bull "De Salute Dominici Gregis" on 1 May 1818, embodying the conclusions of arduous negotiations. The metropolitan archbishopric of Udine was abolished and its bishop made suffragan to Venice. The dioceses of Caprularum (Caorle) and Torcella were suppressed and their territories assigned to the Patriarchate of Venice; Belluno and Feltre were united under a single bishop, aeque personaliter, and assigned to Venice; Padua and Verona became suffragans of Venice.

=== Diocesan synods ===
A diocesan synod was an irregularly held, but important, meeting of the bishop of a diocese and his clergy. Its purpose was (1) to proclaim generally the various decrees already issued by the bishop; (2) to discuss and ratify measures on which the bishop chose to consult with his clergy; (3) to publish statutes and decrees of the diocesan synod, of the provincial synod, and of the Holy See.

Bishop Giovanni Savelli (1295–1299) held a diocesan synod in 1296, fragments of whose constitutions were published by Francesco Scipione Dondi dall' Orologio. Bishop Ildebrandino Conti (1319–1352) held a diocesan synod in 1339. Bishop Pietro Pileo di Prata (1359–1370) presided over a synod in 1360.

On 3 June 1433, Bishop Pietro Donato (1428–1447) held a diocesan synod, the constitutions of which were published by Bishop Dondi. Bishop Fantino Dandolo (1448–1459) presided over a diocesan synod in 1457. Another synod was held by Bishop Pietro Barozzi (1487–1507) in 1488.

A diocesan synod was held in 1579 by Bishop Federico Cornaro (1577–1590). Bishop Marco Antonio Cornaro (1632–1639) presided over his seventh diocesan synod in Pavia on 17 and 18 April 1624, and had the decrees published. A diocesan synod was held by Bishop Giorgio Cornaro (bishop of Padua) (1643–1663) on 20–22 August 1647. Bishop Gregory Barbarigo (1664–1697) held a synod in 1683.

== Bishops of Padua ==
=== to 1200 ===
...

- Crispinus (attested 342–346)

...

- Bergullus (attested 571–577)

...

- Dominicus (attested 827)

...

- Rorigus (attested 855)

...

- Petrus (attested 897)

...

- Sibico (attested 927)

...

- Adalbertus (attested 942)

...

- Gauslinus (Causilinus) (attested 964–977)

...

- Urso (Ursus) (attested 998–1027)
- Aistulfus (attested 1031)
- Burchardus (Burhardus) (attested 1034–1040)
- Arnaldus (attested 1046–1047)
- Bernardus Maltraversus (attested 1048–1058)
- Waltolf (1060–1064)
- Oldericus (1064–1080)
- Milo (1084–1095)
- Petrus (1096–1106)
- Sinibaldus (1106–1125)
- Bellinus (1128–1147)
- Giovanni (Kazo) (1148–1164)
- Gerardo Offreducci da Marostica (1165–1213)

=== 1200 to 1500 ===
- Giordano (1214–1228)
- Giacomo Corrado (1229–1239)
- Sigebaldo Caballazio (1243–1249)
- Giovanni Forzatè (1251–1283)
- [Prencevalle (1284–1287)] Intrusus
- Bernardo Platon (1287–1295)
- Giovanni Savelli, O.P. (1295–1299)
- Ottobono di Razzi (1299–1302)
- Pagano della Torre (1302–1319)
- Ildebrandino Conti (1319–1352)
- Giovanni Orsini (1353–1359)
- Pietro Pileo di Prata (1359–1370)
- Giovanni Piacentini (1370–1371)
- Elia Beaufort (1371–1373)
- Raimondo (1374–1386)

Sede vacante (1386–1388)

- Giovanni Anselmini (1388–1392)
- Ugo Roberti (1392–1396)
- Stefano da Carrara (1396–1405) Administrator
- Alberto Micheli (1406–1409)
- Pietro Marcello (1409–1428)
- Pietro Donato (1428–1447)
- Fantino Dandolo (1448–1459)
- Pietro Barbo (1459–1460)
- Jacopo Zeno (1460–1481)
- Pietro Foscari (1481–1485) Administrator
- Hieronymus Lando (1485–1487)
- Pietro Barozzi (1487–1507)

=== 1500 to 1800 ===
- Cardinal Sisto Gara della Rovere (1509–1517)
- Cardinal Marco Cornaro (1517–1524)
- Cardinal Francesco Pisani (1524–1555)
- Cardinal Luigi Pisani (1555–1570)
- Nicolò Ormanetto (1570–1577)
- Cardinal Federico Cornaro (1577–1590)
- Alvise Corner (1590–1594)
- Marco Cornaro (1594–1625).
- Cardinal Pietro Valier (1625–1629)
- Federico Baldissera Bartolomeo Cornaro (1629–1631)
- Marco Antonio Cornaro (Marcantonio Corner) (1632–1639)
- Luca Stella (1639–1641)
- Giorgio Cornaro (1643–1663)
- Gregory Barbarigo (1664–1697)
- Cardinal Giorgio Cornaro (1697–1722)
- Giovanni Francesco Barbarigo (1723–1730)
- Giovanni Minotto Ottoboni (1730–1742)
- Cardinal Carlo Rezzonico (1743–1758)
- Cardinal Sante Veronese (1758–1767)
- Cardinal Antonio Maria Priuli (1767–1772)
- Nicolò Antonio Giustinian, O.S.B. Casin. (1772–1796)

=== since 1800 ===
Sede vacante (1796–1807)

- Francesco Dondi dall'Orologio (1807–1819)
- Modesto Farina (1821–1856)
- Federico Manfredini (1857–1882)
- Giuseppe Callegari (1882–1906)
- Luigi Pellizzo (1906–1923)
- Elia Dalla Costa (1923–1931)
- Carlo Agostini (1932–1949)
- Girolamo Bortignon, OFM Cap (1949–1982)
- Filippo Franceschi (1982–1988)
- Antonio Mattiazzo (1989–2015)
- Claudio Cipolla (2015–present)

== Books ==
=== General references for bishops ===
- Gams, Pius Bonifatius (1873). Series episcoporum Ecclesiae catholicae: quotquot innotuerunt a beato Petro apostolo (in Latin). Ratisbon: Typis et Sumptibus Georgii Josephi Manz. pp. 797–799.
- Eubel, Conradus, ed. (1913). Hierarchia catholica (in Latin). Vol. Tomus I (second ed.). Münster: Libreria Regensbergiana.
- Eubel, Conradus, ed. (1914). Hierarchia catholica (in Latin). Vol. Tomus II (second ed.). Münster: Libreria Regensbergiana.
- Eubel, Conradus; Gulik, Guilelmus (1923). Hierarchia catholica (in Latin). Vol. Tomus III (second ed.). Münster: Libreria Regensbergiana.
- Gauchat, Patritius (Patrice) (1935). Hierarchia catholica (in Latin). Vol. Tomus IV (1592-1667). Münster: Libraria Regensbergiana.
- Ritzler, Remigius; Sefrin, Pirminus (1952). Hierarchia catholica medii et recentis aevi (in Latin). Vol. Tomus V (1667-1730). Patavii: Messagero di S. Antonio.
- Ritzler, Remigius; Sefrin, Pirminus (1958). Hierarchia catholica medii et recentis aevi. Vol. Tomus VI (1730-1799). Patavii: Messagero di S. Antonio.
- Ritzler, Remigius; Sefrin, Pirminus (1968). Hierarchia Catholica medii et recentioris aevi (in Latin). Vol. VII (1800–1846). Monasterii: Libreria Regensburgiana.
- Remigius Ritzler; Pirminus Sefrin (1978). Hierarchia catholica Medii et recentioris aevi (in Latin). Vol. VIII (1846–1903). Il Messaggero di S. Antonio.
- Pięta, Zenon (2002). Hierarchia catholica medii et recentioris aevi (in Latin). Vol. IX (1903–1922). Padua: Messagero di San Antonio. ISBN 978-88-250-1000-8.

=== Studies ===
- Cappelletti, Giuseppe (1854). Le chiese d'Italia dalla loro origine sino ai nostri giorni (in Italian). Vol. decimo (10). Venezia: G. Antonelli. pp. 105–219.
- Cappelletti, Giuseppe (1875). Storia di Padova dalla sua origine sino al presente (in Italian). Vol. primo. Padova: F. Sacchetto. Volume secondo. 1876.
- Dondi dall'Orologio, Francesco Scipione (1802). Dissertazioni sopra l'istoria ecclesiasti di Padova (in Italian). Vol. (Vol. 1). Padua: presso il Seminario.
- Dondi dell' Orologia, Francesco Scipione (1812). Dissertazione Sesta sopra L'Istoria Ecclesiastica Padovana (in Italian). Vol. VI. Padova: tipografia del Seminario.
- Dondi dall' Orologio, Francesco Scipione (1813). Dissertazioni sopra l'istoria ecclesiastica di Padova (in Italian). Vol. Dissertazione settima (7). Padova: tipografia del Seminario.
- Dondi dall' Orologio, Francesco Scipione (1815). Dissertazioni sopra l'istoria ecclesiastica di Padova (in Italian). Vol. Dissertazione VIII. Padova: tipografia del Seminario. pp. 106–112.
- Dondi dall' Orologio, Francesco Scipione (1817). Dissertazioni sopra l'istoria ecclesiastica di Padova (in Italian). Vol. Dissertazione nona (9). Padova: tipografia del Seminario.
- Giustiniani, Niccolò Antonio (1786). Serie cronologica dei Vescovi di Padova (in Italian). Padua: Stamperia del Seminario.
- Kehr, Paul Fridolin (1923). Italia Pontificia Vol. VII:l Venetiae et Histria, Pars I: Provincia Aquileiensis. Berlin: Weidmann, pp. 153–189. (in Latin).
- Lanzoni, Francesco (1927). Le diocesi d'Italia dalle origini al principio del secolo VII (an. 604). Faenza: F. Lega, pp. 911–917. (in Italian)
- Schwartz, Gerhard (1907). Die Besetzung der Bistümer Reichsitaliens unter den sächsischen und salischen Kaisern: mit den Listen der Bischöfe, 951-1122. Leipzig: B.G. Teubner. (in German)
- Stato personale del clero della città e diocesi di Padova per l'anno 1852 (in Italian). Padova: Coi tipi del Seminario. 1852.
- Ughelli, Ferdinando (1720). Italia Sacra sive De Episcopis Italiae et insularum adjacentium (in Latin). Vol. Tomus quintus. Venezia: apud Sebastianum Coleti. pp. 418–469.
