= 1691 conclave =

Election of Catholic Pope Innocent XII

Papal conclave February–July 1691

Dates and location
- 12 February – 12 July 1691; Apostolic Palace, Papal States

Elected pope
- Antonio Pignatelli; Name taken: Innocent XII
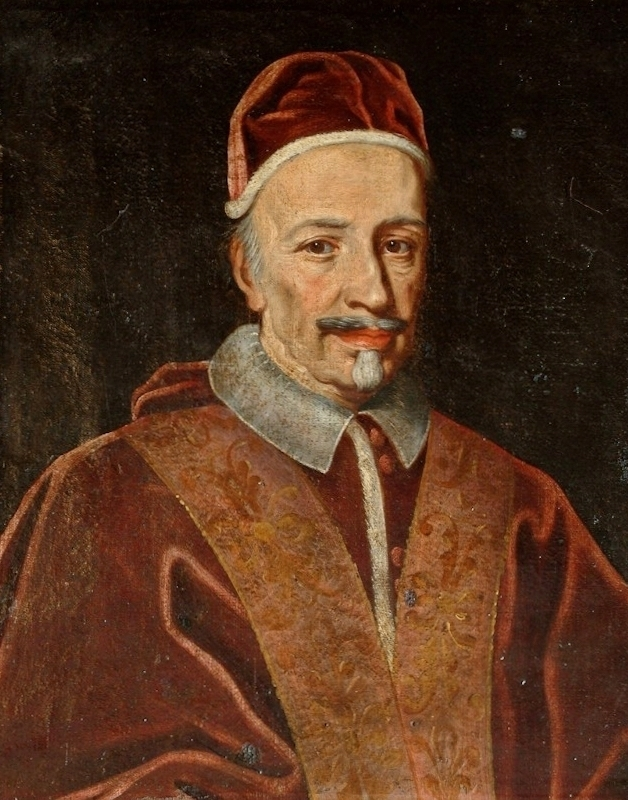

The 1691 papal conclave was convened on the death of Pope Alexander VIII and ended with the election of Cardinal Antonio Pignatelli as Pope Innocent XII. It lasted for five months, from 12 February to 12 July 1691. The conclave became deadlocked after the Catholic monarchs opposed the election of Gregorio Barbarigo, who some members of the College of Cardinals also viewed as too strict. The conclave only ended in July when cardinals started to become ill from the heat, and after French cardinals agreed to vote for Pignatelli despite him coming from Spanish-controlled Naples.

== Background ==
Issues of Gallicanism were prominent in the 1689 conclave that had elected Alexander VIII. Alexander's predecessor, Innocent XI, had refused to confirm new French bishops to the point where thirty-five dioceses lacked a bishop confirmed by Rome in 1688. Alexander's election had been secured by promising that he would confirm the unconfirmed French bishops. Despite this, Alexander's last act as pope before he died was to condemn the Declaration of the Clergy of France on 1 February 1691.

Alexander was also noted for his nepotism that was partially due to his advanced age and belief that his family would have little time to profit from his reign. This was in contrast to his predecessor Innocent XI, who was known for being austere and had not caused any scandals through nepotism.

== Conclave ==
The conclave began on 12 February 1691, and membership in the College of Cardinals was at its statutory maximum of 70 cardinals. Despite this, at the beginning of the conclave only 38 electors were present. The number rose to 44 electors present by 19 February 1691, and by the time of the election of Innocent XII in July, 61 electors were present.

The curial cardinals entered the conclave seeking to elect Gregorio Barbarigo as pope. Leopold I, the Holy Roman Emperor, considered him to be an unacceptable choice because he was a Venetian. While Leopold did not formally exclude Barbarigo, he did not wish for him to be elected. In addition to Leopold, the Spanish ambassador in Rome worked against Barbarigo's election, and Louis XIV of France opposed it because of the wishes of his allies.

Leandro Colloredo, who was the leader of the zelanti faction within the college, initially suggested Barbarigo for the pontificate. Colloredo and his faction also had the backing of Flavio Chigi, the cardinal nephew of Alexander VII, in the conclave. Barbarigo was seen as an individual with a firm moral system, and it was thought that he might abolish nepotism if elected.

Despite Leopold not formally excluding Barbarigo, a rumour spread that he had been excluded, and despite the protests of the zelanti faction of cardinals, enough members of the College of Cardinals recognized the Emperor's ability to exclude a candidate that it prevented his election. Leopold had sent an envoy with two letters for his cardinals: the first public letter declared that he did not wish to see Barbarigo excluded, while the second letter, which was private, expressed his desire that Barbarigo not be elected, but that he did not want to take the blame for the exclusion, but rather wished for the Spanish to be the ones to do so. Additionally, some of the more materialistic cardinals feared that Barbarigo would be similarly strict as Pope Innocent XI, and this factored into his failure to win election.

It was clear to the cardinals that Barbarigo would not be elected pope by the end of April, and the conclave entered a period where it had no clear direction. The daily scrutinies would return no successful candidates, and the afternoon scrutinies would often simply repeat the deadlock that had occurred in the morning. Votes even went to non-cardinals for the first time in a conclave since 1503. There was no clear lead as to who might be elected pope, and at one point several cardinals started a fire in the living quarters by accidentally knocking over a lamp while playing cards. While this caused some of the cells housing the cardinals to be unlivable, three cardinals had died by that point so there was room available to relocate the cardinals who had been put out of their previous housing.

== Election of Innocent XII ==
Federico Altieri began seeking to secure election to the papacy for himself. He had sought to both have a public persona favourable to Leopold I, while also working to curry the favour of Louis XIV. The zelanti faction and Flavio Chigi opposed him, which was enough to stop his victory.

Altieri had positioned himself with his campaign as a credible faction leader within the conclave, and began working to elect his friend Antonio Pignatelli pope. Altieri worked to convince the French cardinals that Pignatelli would not work for the Spanish as pope even though he was from Naples. Pignatelli had received some support in March, but fell short of the majority required for election. At the end of June, however, the heat was increasing and some cardinals became ill. This allowed his candidacy to gain traction, and he was elected pope on 12 July 1691, over the objections of the zelanti faction, and took the name Innocent XII. The conclave was the longest papal election since 1305, having met for more than five months.
