= Mary, Mother of Grace =

Roman Catholic prayer

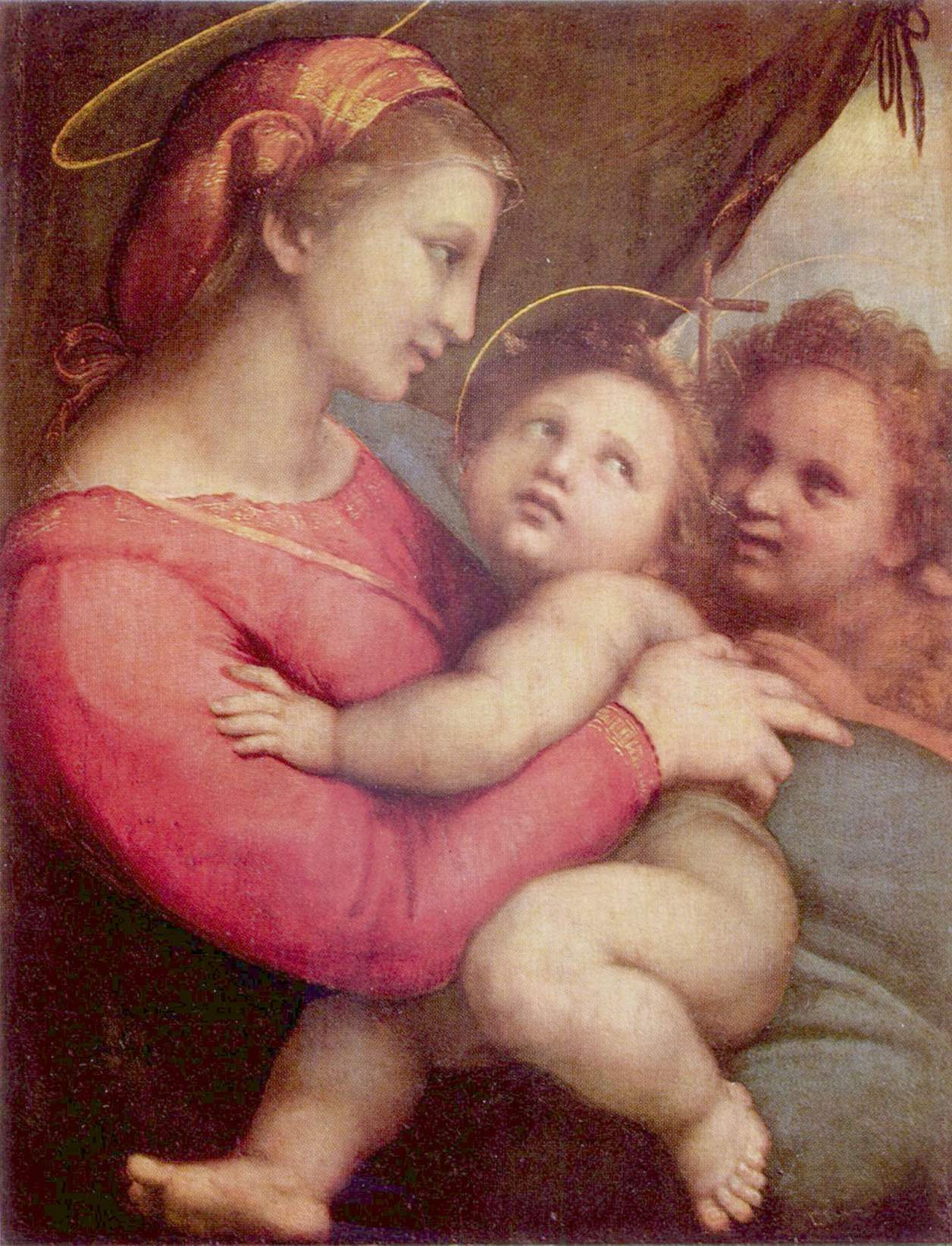
Madonna by Raphael, an example of Marian art

Mary, Mother of Grace (Latin: Maria Mater Gratiae) is a Roman Catholic prayer to the Blessed Virgin Mary.

== Background and origin ==
This prayer is a fragment from within the DEVOTION IN MEMORY OF THE AGONY OF JESUS found in Section VI of the Raccolta.

== Hymn ==
Maria, mater gratiæ,
Dulcis parens clementiæ,
Tu nos ab hoste protege,
Et mortis hora suscipe.
Jesu, tibi sit gloria,
Qui natus es de Virgine,
Cum Patre et almo Spiritu,
In sempiterna sæcula. Amen.

Translation:

Mary, gracious mother,
Sweet fount of mercy,
Protect us from the foe,
And receive us in our hour of death.
Jesu, glory be to Thee,
Born of the Virgin,
With the Father and the Holy Spirit,
For ever and ever. Amen.

== See also ==
- Roman Catholic Mariology
- Raccolta
- Marian devotions
- Blessed Virgin Mary
