= Antonio Mattiazzo =

Italian Catholic prelate (born 1940)

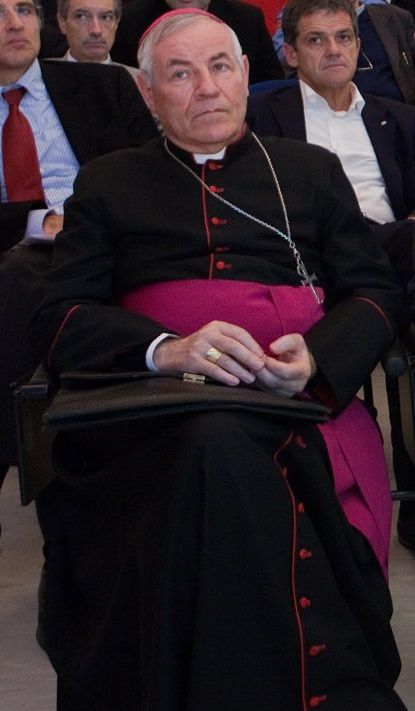
- Antonio Mattiazzo
- Born: 20 April 1940; Rottanova di Cavarzere, Italy
- Education: Pontifical Ecclesiastical Academy, Pontifical Lateran University
- Occupations: Catholic bishop, Apostolic Nuncio
- Known for: Bishop of Padua (1989–2015)

Antonio Mattiazzo (born 20 April 1940) is an Italian prelate of the Catholic Church who was Bishop of Padua with the personal title of archbishop from 1989 to 2015. He worked in the diplomatic service of the Holy See and was Apostolic Nuncio to Ivory Coast, Burkina Faso, and Niger from 1985 to 1989.

== Biography ==
Antonio Mattiazzo was born on 20 April 1940 in Rottanova di Cavarzere, Italy, where his family had traveled from their hometown of Saletto to find work. He entered the seminary of Padua in 1951 and was ordained a priest on 5 July 1964.

To prepare for a diplomatic career he entered the Pontifical Ecclesiastical Academy in 1964. He also studied at the Pontifical Lateran University. His early assignments in the diplomatic service included stints in Nicaragua, the United States, Brazil, France, and in Rome at the offices of the Secretariat of State.

On 16 November 1985, Pope John Paul II named him titular archbishop of Virunum, Apostolic Nuncio to Côte d'Ivoire, and Apostolic Pro-Nuncio to both Burkina Faso and Niger. He received his episcopal consecration on 14 December 1985 from Cardinal Agostino Casaroli.

On 5 July 1989, Pope John Paul appointed him Bishop of Padua with the personal title of archbishop. He was installed there on 17 September.

Pope Francis accepted his resignation on 18 July 2015.
