= Giorgio Cornaro (bishop of Padua) =

Roman Catholic prelate

Most Reverend Giorgio Cornaro
- Bishop of Padua
- Church: Catholic Church
- Diocese: Diocese of Padua
- In office: 1642–1663
- Predecessor: Luca Stella
- Successor: Gregorio Giovanni Gasparo Barbarigo

Orders
- Consecration: 20 July 1642 by Marcantonio Bragadin

Personal details
- Born: 1613 Venice, Italy
- Died: 1663 (age 50) Padua, Italy

Giorgio Cornaro (1613–1663) was a Roman Catholic prelate who served as Bishop of Padua (1642–1663).

== Biography ==
Giorgio Cornaro was born in Venice, Italy in 1613. On 14 July 1642, he was appointed during the papacy of Pope Urban VIII as Bishop of Padua. On 20 July 1642, he was consecrated bishop by Marcantonio Bragadin, Bishop of Vicenza, with Faustus Poli, Titular Archbishop of Amasea, and Giovanni Battista Altieri, Bishop Emeritus of Camerino, serving as co-consecrators. He served as Bishop of Padua until his death in 1663.

== External links and additional sources ==
- Cheney, David M. "Diocese of Padova {Padua}". Catholic-Hierarchy.org. (for Chronology of Bishops) ^{[self-published]}
- Chow, Gabriel. "Diocese of Padova (Italy)". GCatholic.org. (for Chronology of Bishops) ^{[self-published]}

Catholic Church titles
Preceded by Luca Stella	Bishop of Padua; 1642–1663	Succeeded by Gregorio Giovanni Gasparo Barbarigo
