= Rubricarum instructum =

1960 apostolic letter of Pope John XXIII

Rubricarum instructum is an apostolic letter of Pope John XXIII issued motu proprio on July 25, 1960 promulgating the new Code of Rubrics for both the Roman Breviary and the Roman Missal.

== Contents ==
The Code of Rubrics promulgated by Rubricarum instructum (effective January 1, 1961) superseded the existing rubrics for both the Roman Breviary and the Roman Missal as previously codified in 1570 by Pope Pius V in his papal bull Quo primum and revised in 1604 by Pope Clement VIII (Cum sanctissimum), 1634 by Pope Urban VIII (Si quid est), 1911 by Pope Pius X (Divino afflatu), and in 1955 by Pope Pius XII (Cum hac nostra aetate and Maxima redemptionis). A number of rubrical changes were introduced, including a new system of ranking the various liturgical days of the Roman rite (as days of the first, second, third, or fourth class) that superseded the traditional ranking of Sundays and feast days as doubles of varying degrees and simples. A number of simplifications were introduced into the rubrics, including the elimination of many of the patristic readings at Matins and a reduction in the number of commemorations to be observed in the Office and Mass. Several changes were introduced into the rituals to be observed at Mass, such as eliminating the requirement for the celebrant to read the Epistle and Gospel at the altar during solemn Mass while the texts are chanted by the subdeacon and deacon, respectively.

Rubricarum instructum also called for the publication of new typical editions of the Breviary and Missal incorporating the changes introduced by the Code of Rubrics into the text; the revised Breviary was issued in 1961, while the revised Missal was issued in 1962.

== Legacy ==
The Code of Rubrics promulgated by Rubricarum instructum was superseded by subsequent legislation issued in 1965 and 1967, as well as by the introduction of the Mass of Paul VI in 1970 and the Liturgy of the Hours in 1974. However, the 1960 Code of Rubrics remains the official liturgical legislation for clergy who offer the sacraments under the provisions set forth by Pope Benedict XVI in his 2007 motu proprio Summorum Pontificum.
