= Mysterii Paschalis =

Apostolic letter issued by Pope Paul VI in 1969

Mysterii Paschalis is an apostolic letter issued motu proprio (that is, "of his own accord") by Pope Paul VI on 14 February 1969. It reorganized the liturgical year of the Roman Rite and revised the liturgical celebrations of Jesus Christ and the saints in the General Roman Calendar. It promulgated the General Roman Calendar of 1969.

== Content of the apostolic letter ==
By this document, Pope Paul VI implemented the Second Vatican Council's norms for restoring the liturgical year and "approve[d] by Our apostolic authority […] the new Roman Universal Calendar […] and likewise the general norms concerning the arrangement of the liturgical year". The new norms became effective on 1 January 1970.

== Liturgical year ==
The principles indicated in the document Universal Norms for the Liturgical Year were declared applicable both to the Roman Rite and to all other liturgical rites, while the practical norms were to be understood as intended for the Roman Rite alone except in so far as by their very nature they concerned other rites as well.

A liturgical day is defined as running from midnight to midnight except for Sundays and solemnities, which begin on the previous evening.

Sunday, as the day of the resurrection of Christ, is the primordial feast day and does not admit other celebrations of rank below that of a solemnity or a feast of the Lord. In Advent, Lent and Easter, Sundays outrank even solemnities. With a very few exceptions, other celebrations are as a rule not to be assigned so that they always fall on a Sunday. The exceptions are the Holy Family of Jesus, Mary, and Joseph, the Baptism of the Lord, Trinity Sunday, the Feast of Christ the King, and, where any of these is not a holy day of obligation, Epiphany, Ascension of the Lord, and the Body and Blood of Christ.

A new ranking of liturgical days in the Roman Rite was established with regard to celebrations of saints. In accordance with the relative importance of the celebrations, they are ranked as solemnities, feasts, or memorials. The solemnities of the Nativity of the Lord and Easter each have an octave, and memorials can be either obligatory or optional.

Saints of worldwide significance are to be celebrated everywhere, while others are to listed in the General Calendar as optional or are to be left to local or national calendars or those of religious institutes.

Weekdays of special importance are Ash Wednesday and the days of Holy Week, which outrank all other celebrations, and also the Advent weekdays from 17 to 24 December, and all the weekdays of Lent.

== Overview of changes to the Proper of Saints ==
The Second Vatican Council decreed: "Lest the feasts of the saints should take precedence over the feasts which commemorate the very mysteries of salvation, many of them should be left to be celebrated by a particular Church or nation or family of religious; only those should be extended to the universal Church which commemorate saints who are truly of universal importance."

Of devotional feasts, not celebrating an event in the mystery of salvation, Pope Pius V retained only two in the Tridentine calendar (Corpus Christi and Feast of the Holy Trinity), but the following centuries saw the addition of feasts of the Holy Name of Mary (1683), Our Lady of Ransom (1696), Our Lady of the Rosary (1716), Holy Name of Jesus (1721), Our Lady of Mount Carmel (1726), Compassion of the Blessed Virgin Mary (1727), Seven Sorrows of Mary (1814), Precious Blood of Christ (1849), Sacred Heart of Jesus (1856), Our Lady of Lourdes (1907), Holy Family (1921), Christ the King (1925), Maternity of the Blessed Virgin Mary (1931), Immaculate Heart of Mary (1942), Queenship of Mary (1954), and Saint Joseph the Worker (1955).

The devotional feasts of the Lord that have been kept with high ranking are Trinity Sunday, Body and Blood of Christ, Christ the King, the Holy Family, and the Sacred Heart of Jesus. The Holy Name of Jesus was at first removed but later restored as an optional memorial.

The devotional feasts of the Blessed Virgin Mary that have been kept are those of her Motherhood of God (a solemnity), her Queenship, Sorrow, Rosary, and Presentation (obligatory memorials), and as optional memorials Our Lady of Lourdes, the Immaculate Heart of Mary, Our Lady of Mount Carmel, and the Dedication of the Basilica of St Mary Major. Reduction of the number of devotional feasts of Our Lady results in raising of profile of the feasts of the Lord closely associated with the Mother of Jesus (the Annunciation and the Presentation of the Lord) and of the major feasts of mysteries of her life (Immaculate Conception, Nativity, Visitation, and Assumption).

Progress in historical and hagiographical studies led to distinguishing three classes of saints included in the 1960 calendar that it seemed better not to keep in the revision. One class is that of the saints about whom there are serious historical problems. It cannot be affirmed that they did not exist, but the lack of clear grounds for venerating them led to their exclusion from the 1969 calendar with the single exception of Saint Cecilia (22 November) by reason of popular devotion to her. Another class is that of those ancient Roman martyrs about whom there is clear historical evidence but of whom little, if anything, is known other than their names, with the result that they have little meaning for the faithful of today. A third class is that of the founders of the ancient Roman churches known as tituli and about whom there exists a specific genre of legends. For lack of evidence that they were martyrs or confessors, as pictured in the legends, they were excluded from the revision, again with the single exception of Saint Cecilia.

While the many Roman martyrs and popes that remained (the popes reduced from 38 to 15) ensured that the tradition of a Roman calendar was preserved, the revised calendar also endeavored to maintain a certain geographical and chronological balance, by selecting from the martyrs inscribed in the 1960 calendar, the more famous ancient saints and those best known at a popular level in Rome and elsewhere, and adding some medieval and modern martyrs from different countries. A similar selection was made among non-martyr saints, with the result that 30 were removed to particular calendars. For the sake of geographical balance, most of these were Italians.

== Reception ==
The New York Times questioned the removal of popular feast days such as Saint Valentine's Day or the feast of Saint Bernard.

== See also ==
- General Roman Calendar
- General Roman Calendar of 1960
- General Roman Calendar of Pope Pius XII
- General Roman Calendar of 1954
- Tridentine calendar
