= Religious Communities of the Name of Jesus =

Religious Communities of the Name of Jesus may be:

- Knights of the Name of Jesus, the precursor of the Swedish chivalric order of the Seraphim
- Sisters of the Name of Jesus, six congregations of sisters founded in France during the nineteenth century in the Dioceses of Besançon.
- Sisters of the Holy Names of Jesus and Mary - A Quebec based teaching order of nuns
- Confraternity of the Name of Jesus, a Catholic lay association under the care of the Dominicans
