= Society of the Holy Name =

Catholic confraternity

- Dominican Order Coat of Arms
- Formation: early 15th century
- Type: Catholic lay organisations
- Key people: Didacus of Victoria
- Website: www.nahns.com

The Society of the Holy Name, formally known as the Confraternity of the Most Holy Name of God and Jesus, is a Roman Catholic confraternity of the laity and is one of several which are under the care of the Dominican Order. It is open to all Catholic adults. The primary object of the society is to beget reverence for the Holy Name of God and Jesus Christ; it is also dedicated to making reparations, in particular, for blasphemy, perjury and immorality.

== History ==
The Council of Lyons in 1274 emphasized the need for the faithful to have a special devotion to the Holy Name of Jesus. The Dominicans, who were actively spreading the Christian message at this time in a crusade against the Albegensians took on the challenge and preached the power of the Holy Name of Jesus. They spread the devotion extremely effectively. In every Dominican church, altars, confraternities and societies were erected everywhere in honour of the Holy Name.

The devotion grew rapidly with the preaching of the Dominican order and several saints (including Bernardino of Siena, a Franciscan, and John of Capistrano). The devotion and confraternities were given further impetus by several grants of indulgence by Pope Boniface IX and Pope Julius II.

The first Holy Name Society in the modern sense was founded in the early 15th century by Didacus of Victoria, one of the greatest preachers of the devotion to the Divine Name. He founded the "Society of the Holy Name of God" and created a rule for its governance whose purpose "was to suppress the horrible profanation of the Divine Name by blasphemers, perjurers, and by men in their ordinary conversation." Long after Didacus' death in 1450, Pope Pius IV approved the society on April 13, 1564. In later years, the Society of the Holy Name of God merged with the "Confraternity of the Most Holy Name Jesus", maintaining the rule laid down by Didacus. The society was thereafter also known under the title of the "Confraternity Against Oaths". Several Popes following Pius IV in the 16th and 17th centuries also made the Confraternity an object of special preference, including, most notably Pope Innocent IX who strongly encouraged its promotion and issued orders regulating its organisation.

The next major step in the formation of the modern society came on June 21, 1571, when St. Pius V issued his Motu proprio "Decet Romanum", which restricted the canonical erection of the confraternity entirely to the jurisdiction of the Dominican Order and formally recognised "The Confraternity of the Most Holy Names of God".

A final merger came on May 26, 1727, when Pope Benedict XIII confirmed the various privileges on both the "Confraternity of the Holy Name of God" and the "Society of the Name of Jesus" in his document Pretiosus. The two confraternities were essentially merged under the name "The Confraternity of the most Holy Names of God and Jesus", and exclusive rights to their governance were given to the Dominicans. In order to establish a local Society of the Holy Name, approval must be granted by the Dominican order, in the form of Letters patent.

Until the conciliar reforms of the 1970s, the Holy Name Society was a society for men. While some parish Holy Name societies are still all-male, the Holy Name Society as a whole now welcomes both Catholic men and women.

== Membership requirements ==
Membership is open to practicing Catholic men over the age of 18. Membership in the Holy Name Society is typically at the parish level. A candidate may join as a novice member if they reside in an area where there is no active Parish, Deanery or (Arch)diocesan Holy Name Society.

During a novitiate (trial period), candidates undergo an orientation period where they learn the history, purpose, mission, Spiritual Benefits of membership, the Obligations of Membership, and the Holy Name Pledge. "They should be given a copy of the Constitution and By-Laws of the Parish Society so they fully understand the purpose of the Confraternity and how it is governed. During their novitiate ... novice-members should demonstrate their sincerity and commitment by attending all spiritual conferences, devotional activities, and assemblies."

A candidate becomes a full member after undergoing the Induction Ceremony, which is typically conducted on the Feast of the most Holy Name of Jesus, January 3, with their name being entered into the Society's Official Register.

=== Induction ===
This ceremony, which is typically carried out on the Feast of the Holy Name (January 3), consists of a profession of faith in a parish society chartered to the Dominican Order, as well as a series of solemn promises. These promises are to observe the Society's rules and constitutions; to love and respect the Holy Name; to abstain from blasphemy; to reverence Divine law and to respect civil law and civil authority; to love the Pope and to be a full member of the Catholic Church; to believe the Church's teachings, and to teach others of them; and to receive the sacraments regularly, pray often and perform works of physical and mental mortification on a regular basis.

Following the solemn promises, members receive the handbook and a blessed token of the Society (usually a lapel pin).

== Symbols of the Society ==
The Society makes use of a symbol of a man's head, surmounting a rayed halo, with a small Latin cross before his mouth. The motto of the Society is "Hallowed be Thy Name," which sits on the bottom rim of the symbol, the top rim having the letters "HNS," referring to the initials of the Society.

== Activities ==
The apostolate of the society is to assist in parish ministries by performing the Corporal Works of Mercy: to feed the hungry, to clothe the naked, give drink to the thirsty, shelter to the homeless, tend the sick, visit those in prison, and bury the dead; as well as the Spiritual Works of Mercy: to convert sinners, instruct the ignorant, counsel the wayward, comfort the sorrowing, bear adversity patiently, forgive offenses, and pray for the living and the dead.

=== Diocesan and prison ministry ===
The Society performs these in a specific way at a local level by working on Archdiocesan projects. The National Association of the Holy Name Society, however, works with Prison Community in the State of Pennsylvania (USA), and has been doing so for the past 23 years.

=== The canonisation of Blessed John of Vercelli ===
The other cause sought by the Society is the canonization of Blessed John of Vercelli, for which prayers are said at all meetings of the society. He is considered to be the "Founding Father" of the Holy Name Society, as it was he who volunteered the Dominican Order for the duty of promoting devotion to the Holy Name at the Second Council of Lyon in 1274 (due to the death of Thomas Aquinas on his way to the council). He was a learned man, heavily involved in the Council. He was, amongst other things, nearly elected pope, and had been Master General of the Dominican Order.

== Worldwide distribution ==
The Holy Name Society is found in other countries also, although not as strongly as in the United States. Australia has several branches; however numbers have dwindled in comparison to the numbers of the 1950s, when membership numbered in excess of 100,000. The Society had a brief revival beginning in 1998, when the society was canonically erected in Melbourne with ecclesiastical approval, although no subsequent branches have been erected.

== See also ==
- Religious Communities of the Name of Jesus
