= Circumcision of Jesus =

Event from the life of Jesus

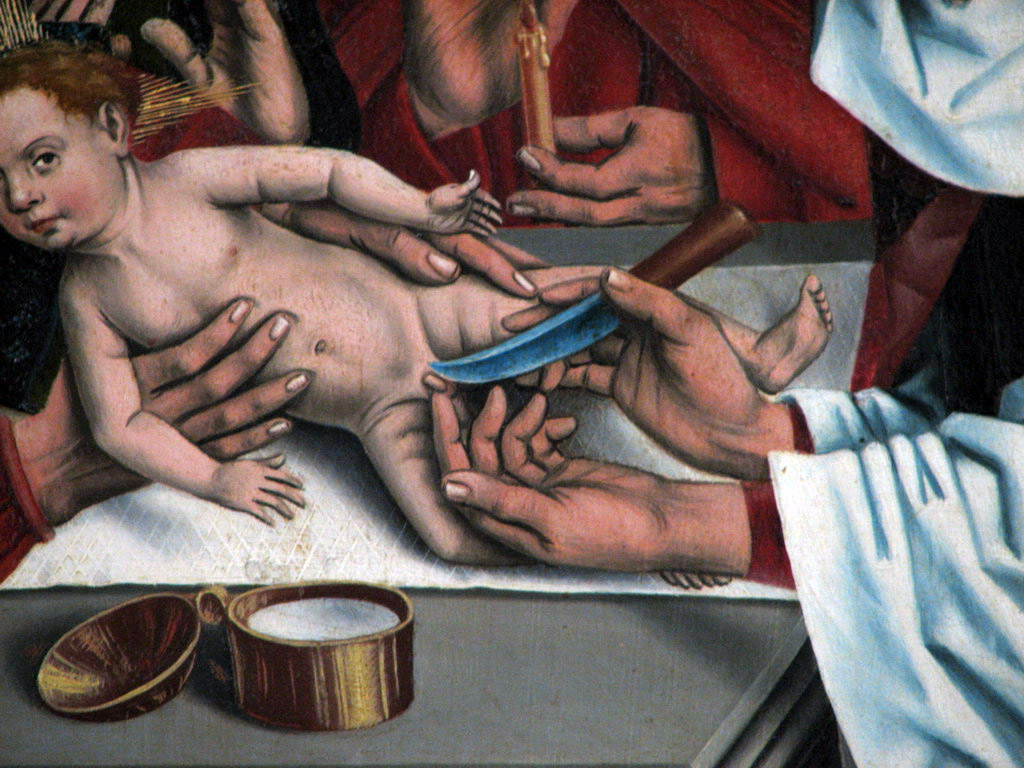
A detail from The Circumcision of Christ by Friedrich Herlin

The circumcision of Jesus is an event from the life of Jesus, according to the Gospel of Luke chapter 2, which states:

And when eight days were fulfilled to circumcise the child, his name was called Jesus, the name called by the angel before he was conceived in the womb.

The eight days after his birth is traditionally observed 1 January. This is in keeping with the Halakha, which dictates that males should be circumcised eight days after birth by a Mohel in a Brit Milah ceremony, at which they are also given their name. The circumcision of Christ became a very common subject in Christian art from the 10th century onwards, one of numerous events in the Life of Christ to be frequently depicted by artists. It was initially seen only as a scene in larger cycles, but by the Renaissance might be treated as an individual subject for a painting, or form the main subject in an altarpiece.

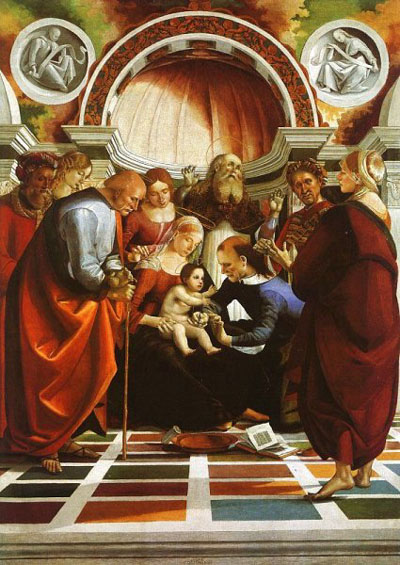
Luca Signorelli's c. 1491 Circumcision of Christ, commissioned by the Confraternity of the Holy Name of Jesus in Volterra, with Simeon at the rear

The event is celebrated as the Feast of the Circumcision in the Eastern Orthodox Church on 1 January in whichever calendar is used, and is also celebrated on the same day by many Anglicans. It is celebrated by Roman Catholics as the Feast of the Holy Name of Jesus, in recent years on 3 January as an Optional Memorial, though it was for long celebrated on 1 January, as some other churches still do. A number of relics claiming to be the Holy Prepuce, the foreskin of Jesus, have surfaced.

== Biblical accounts ==
Luke's account of Jesus's circumcision is extremely short, particularly compared to Paul the Apostle's much fuller description of his own circumcision in the third chapter of his Epistle to the Philippians. This led theologians Friedrich Schleiermacher and David Strauss to speculate that the author of the Gospel of Luke might have assumed the circumcision to be historical fact, or might have been relating it as recalled by someone else.

In addition to the canonical account in the Gospel of Luke, the Arabic Infancy Gospel (a work of apocrypha) contains the first reference to the survival of Christ's severed foreskin. The second chapter has the following story: "And when the time of his circumcision was come, namely, the eighth day, on which the law commanded the child to be circumcised, they circumcised him in a cave. And the old Hebrew woman took the foreskin (others say she took the navel-string), and preserved it in an alabaster-box of old oil of spikenard. And she had a son who was a druggist, to whom she said, "Take heed thou sell not this alabaster box of spikenard-ointment, although thou shouldst be offered three hundred pence for it. Now this is that alabaster-box which Mary the sinner procured, and poured forth the ointment out of it upon the head and feet of our Lord Jesus Christ, and wiped it off with the hairs of her head".

== Depictions in art ==
The circumcision controversy in early Christianity was resolved in the 1st century, so that non-Jewish Christians were not obliged to be circumcised. Saint Paul, the leading proponent of this position, discouraged circumcision as a qualification for conversion to Christianity. Circumcision soon became rare in most of the Christian world, except the Coptic Church of Egypt (where circumcision was a tradition dating to pre-Christian times) and for Judeo-Christians. Perhaps for this reason, the subject of the circumcision of Christ was extremely rare in Christian art of the 1st millennium, and there appear to be no surviving examples until the very end of the period, although literary references suggest it was sometimes depicted.

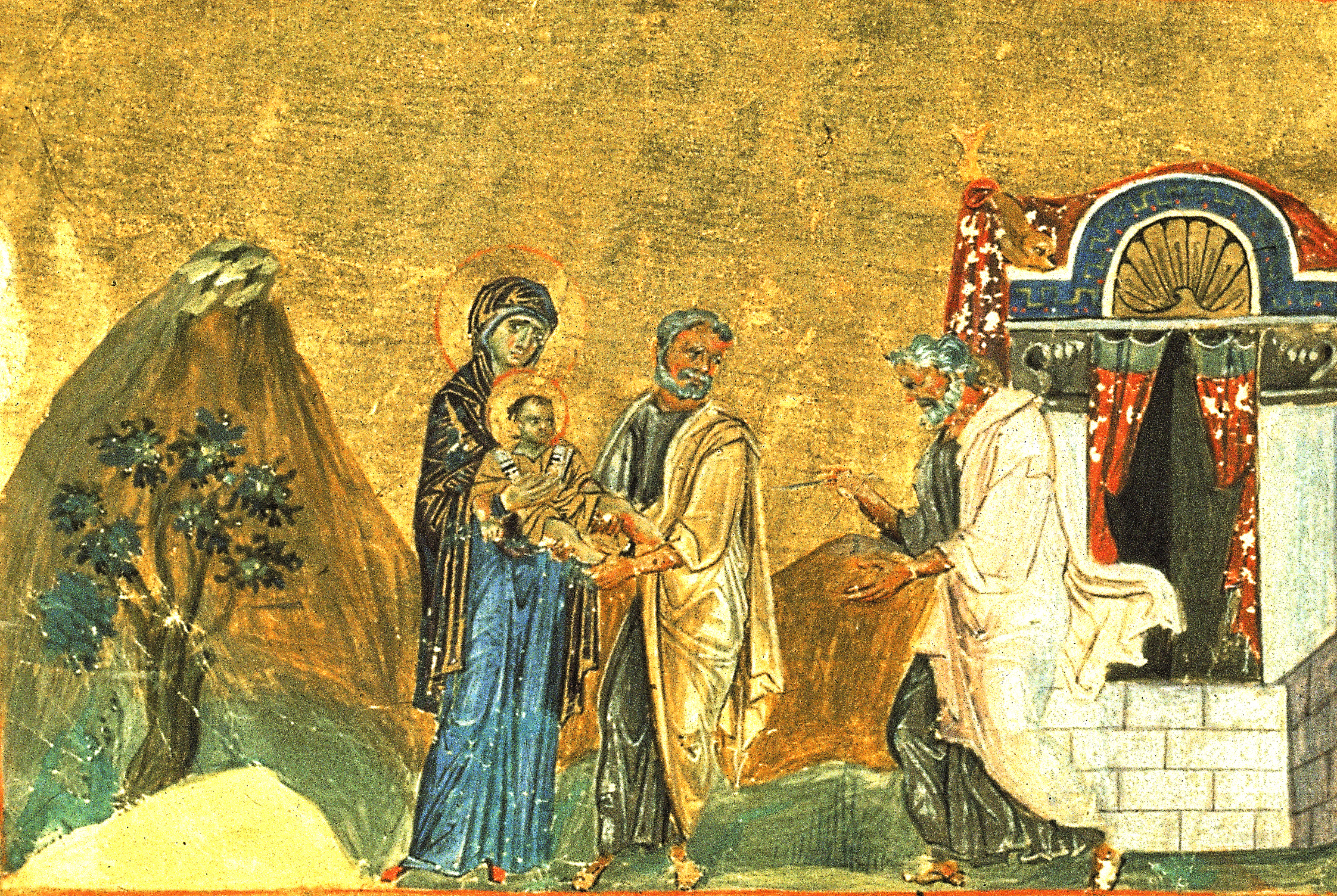
Depiction in the Menologion of Basil II (c. 980)

One of the earliest depictions to survive is a miniature in an important Byzantine illuminated manuscript of 979–984, the Menologion of Basil II in the Vatican Library. This has a scene which shows Mary and Joseph holding the baby Jesus outside a building, probably the Temple of Jerusalem, as a priest comes towards them with a small knife. This is typical of the early depictions, which avoid showing the operation itself. At the period of Jesus's birth, the actual Jewish practice was for the operation to be performed at home, usually by the father, and Joseph is shown using the knife in an enamelled plaque from the Klosterneuburg Altar (1181) by Nicolas of Verdun, where it is next to plaques showing the very rare scenes (in Christian art) of the circumcisions of Isaac and Samson. Like most later depictions these are shown taking place in a large building, probably representing the Temple, though in fact the ceremony was never performed there. Medieval pilgrims to the Holy Land were told Jesus had been circumcised in the church at Bethlehem.

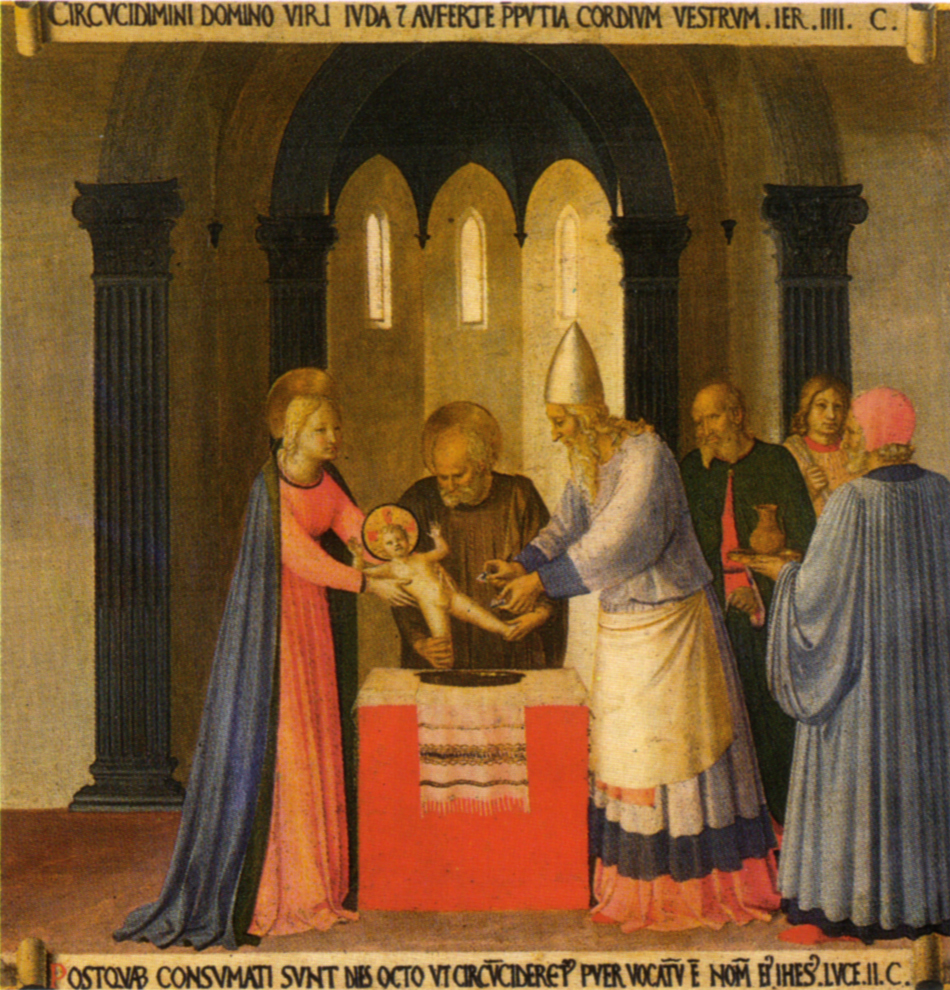
Depiction of the Circumcision of Jesus by Fra Angelico (c. 1450)

The scene gradually became increasingly common in the art of the Western church, and increasingly rare in Orthodox art. Various themes in theological exegesis of the event influenced the treatment in art. As the first drawing of Christ's blood, it was also seen as a forerunner of, or even the first scene of, the Passion of Christ, and was one of the Seven Sorrows of Mary. Other interpretations developed based on it as the naming ceremony equivalent to Christian baptism, the aspect which was eventually to become most prominent in Catholic thinking. Both in this respect and in terms of finding a place in a pictorial cycle, consideration of the circumcision put it in a kind of competition with the much better established Presentation of Jesus; eventually the two scenes were to be conflated in some paintings.

An influential book by Leo Steinberg, The Sexuality of Christ in Renaissance Art and in Modern Oblivion (1983, 2nd edition 1996), explores the explicit depiction of Christ's penis in art, which he argues became a new focus of attention in late medieval art, initially covered only by a transparent veil in the early 14th century, and by the second half of the century completely uncovered, and often being the subject of the gaze or gestures of other figures in the scene. This emphasis is, among other things, a demonstration of Christ's humanity when it appears in depictions of the Madonna and Child and other scenes of Christ's childhood, and also a foreshadowing of Christ's Passion to come in the context of the Circumcision.

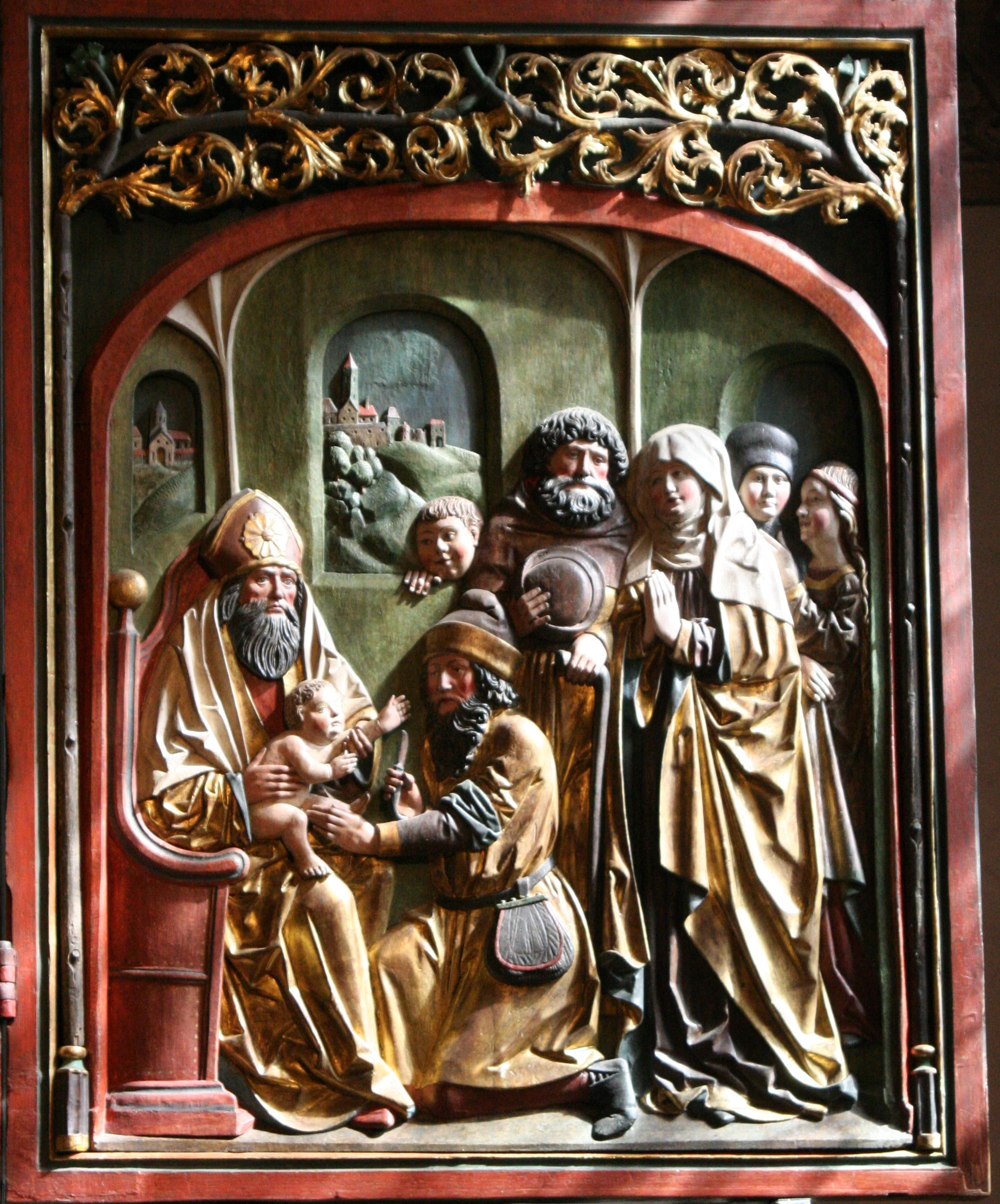
Scene from a German painted wood altarpiece

Having borrowed the large architectural setting in the Temple of the Presentation, later scenes may show the high priest alone holding the baby, as he or a mohel performs the operation, as in the St Wolfgang altarpiece by Michael Pacher (1481), or Dürer's painting (right) and his influential woodcut from his series on the Life of the Virgin. This reflected what had by then become, and remains, standard Jewish practice, where the ceremony is performed in the synagogue and the baby is held by the seated rabbi as the mohel performs the operation. Such an arrangement is seen in a miniature from a German Pentateuch in Hebrew from about 1300, showing the Circumcision of Isaac. Other depictions show the baby held by Mary or Joseph, or both. Many show another baby in the background, presumably the next in the queue.

Other late medieval and Renaissance depictions of circumcision in general show antipathy towards Judaism; caricatures show the procedure as being grotesquely cruel and the mohel as a threatening figure; Martin Luther's anti-Judaic treatise of 1543, On the Jews and Their Lies, devotes many pages to circumcision. Some late-medieval German depictions depict the Circumcision of Christ in a similar vein, with the baby not held by his parents and the officiating Jewish officials given stereotypic features. In at least one manuscript miniature women are shown performing the rite, which has been interpreted as a misogynistic trope, with circumcision represented as a form of emasculation.

By the 15th century the scene was often prominent in large polyptych altarpieces with many scenes in Northern Europe, and began to be the main scene on the central panel in some cases, usually when commissioned by lay confraternities dedicated to the Holy Name of Jesus, which were found in many cities. These often included donor portraits of members, though none are obvious in Luca Signorelli's Circumcision of Christ commissioned by the confraternity at Volterra. The devotion to the Holy Name was a strong feature of the theatrical and extremely popular preaching of Saint Bernardino of Siena, who adopted Christ's IHS monogram as his personal emblem, which was also used by the Jesuits; this often appears in paintings, as may a scroll held by an angel reading Vocatum est nomen eius Jesum.

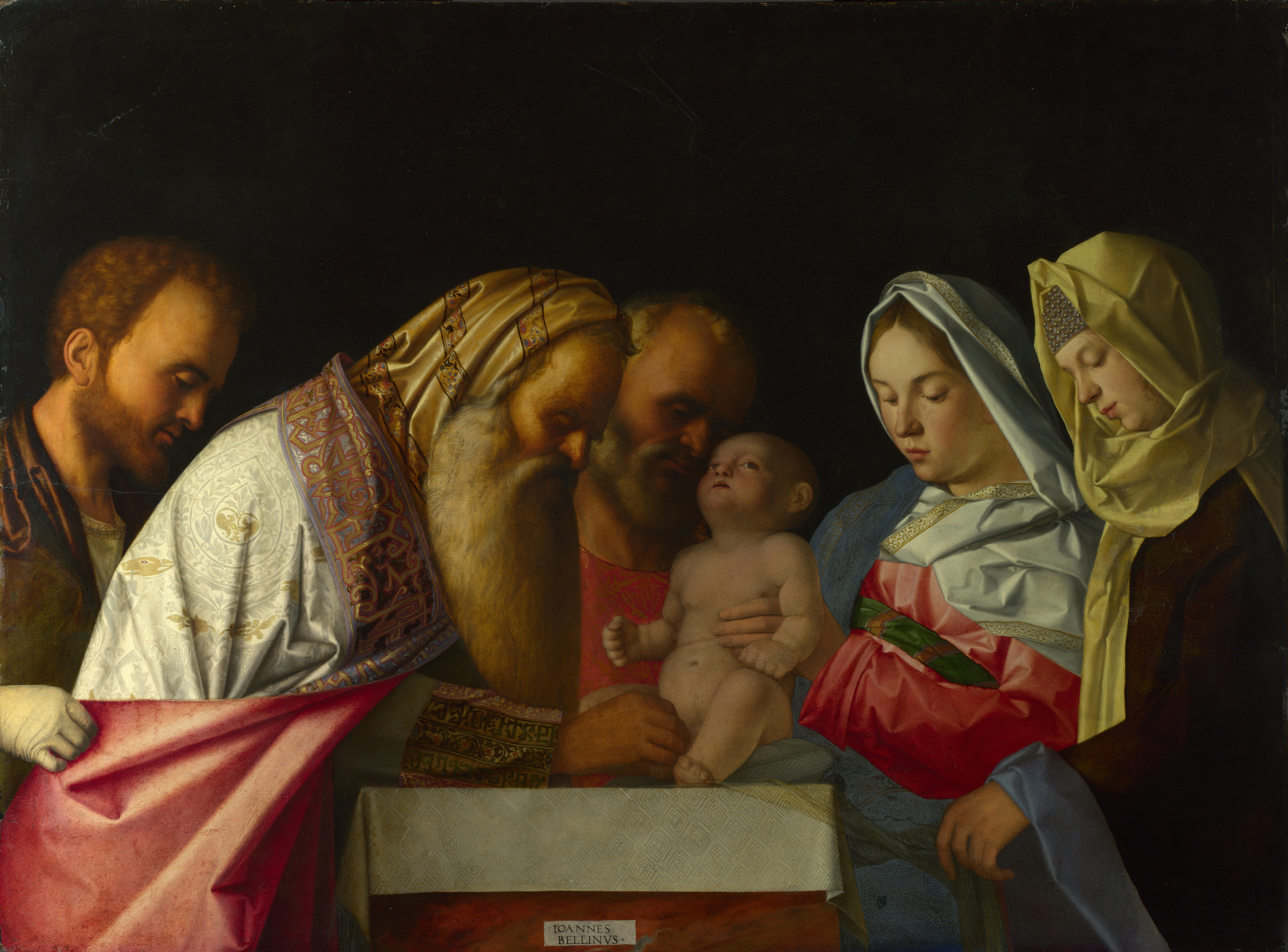
Workshop of Giovanni Bellini (c. 1500)

A smaller composition in a horizontal format originated with the Venetian painter Giovanni Bellini in about 1500 and was extremely popular, with at least 34 copies or versions being produced over the following decades; the nearest to a prime version is in the National Gallery, London, though attributed to his workshop. These appear to have been commissioned for homes, possibly as votive offerings for the safe birth of an eldest son, although the reason for their popularity remains unclear. They followed some other depictions in showing Simeon, the prophet of the Presentation, regarded by then as a High Priest of the Temple, performing the operation on Jesus held by Mary. In other depictions he is a figure in the background, sometimes holding up his hands and looking to heaven, as in the Signorelli. An altarpiece of 1500 by another Venetian painter, Marco Marziale (National Gallery, London), is a thoroughgoing conflation of the Circumcision and Presentation, with the text of Simeon's prophecy, the Nunc dimittis, shown as if in mosaic on the vaults of the temple setting. There were a number of comparable works, some commissioned in circumstances where it is clear that the iconography would have had to pass learned scrutiny, so the conflation was evidently capable of theological approval, although some complaints are also recorded.

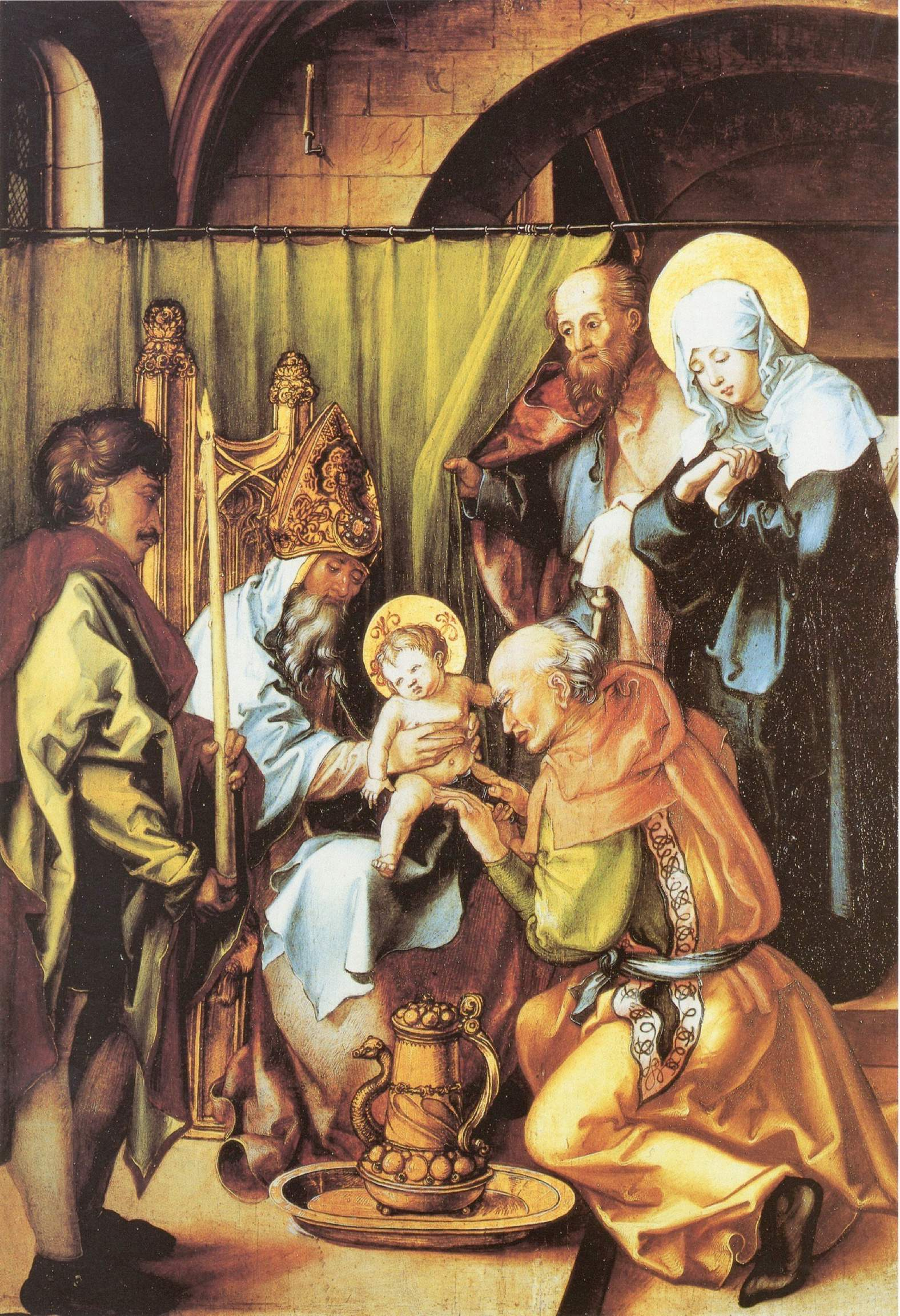
The Circumcision of Christ from the Seven Sorrows Polyptych by Albrecht Dürer

The scene was often included in Protestant art, where this included narrative scenes. It appears on baptismal fonts because of the connection made by theologians with baptism. A painting (1661, National Gallery of Art, Washington) and an etching (1654) by Rembrandt are both unusual in showing the ceremony taking place in a stable. By this period large depictions were rarer in Catholic art, not least because the interpretation of the decrees of the final session of the Council of Trent in 1563 discouraged nudity in religious art, even that of the infant Jesus, which made depicting the scene difficult. Even before this, 16th-century depictions like those of Bellini, Dürer and Signorelli tended to discreetly hide Jesus's penis from view, in contrast to earlier compositions, where this evidence of his humanity is clearly displayed.

Poems on the subject included John Milton's Upon the Circumcision and his contemporary Richard Crashaw's Our Lord in His Circumcision to His Father, which both expounded the traditional symbolism.

== Theological beliefs and celebrations ==
The circumcision of Jesus has traditionally been seen, as explained in the popular 14th-century work the Golden Legend, as the first time the blood of Christ was shed, and thus the beginning of the process of the redemption of man, and a demonstration that Christ was fully human, and of his obedience to Biblical law. Medieval and Renaissance theologians repeatedly stressed this, also drawing attention to the suffering of Jesus as a demonstration of his humanity and a foreshadowing of his Passion. These themes were continued by Protestant theologians like Jeremy Taylor, who in a treatise of 1657 argued that Jesus's circumcision proved his human nature while fulfilling the law of Moses. Taylor also notes that had Jesus been uncircumcised, it would have made Jews substantially less receptive to his Evangelism. However, the Ethiopian Orthodox church has traditionally held that Jesus was divinely circumcised and prophesied that his blood would not be shed until he was crucified.

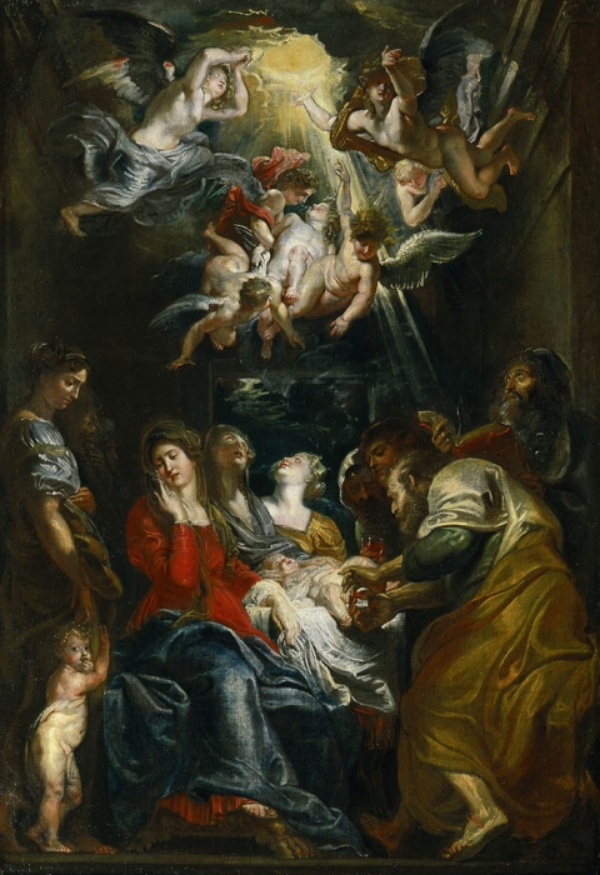
Die Beschneidung Christi, Rubens, 1605

The "Feast of the Circumcision of our Lord" is a Christian celebration of the circumcision, eight days (according to the Semitic and southern European calculation of intervals of days) after his birth, the occasion on which the child was formally given his name, Jesus, a name derived from Hebrew meaning "salvation" or "saviour". It is first recorded from a church council held at Tours in 567, although it was clearly already long-established.

The feast day appears on 1 January in the liturgical calendar of the Eastern Orthodox Church. It also appears in the pre-1960 General Roman Calendar and is celebrated by churches of the Anglican Communion (though in many revised Anglican calendars, such as the 1979 calendar of the Episcopal Church, there is a tendency toward associating the day more with the Holy Name of Jesus) and virtually all Lutheran churches. Johann Sebastian Bach wrote several cantatas for this Feast, "Beschneidung des Herrn" ("Circumcision of the Lord"), including Singet dem Herrn ein neues Lied, BWV 190, for 1 January 1724 in Leipzig.

It finds no place in the present Roman Calendar of the new form of the Roman Rite, replaced on 1 January by the Solemnity of Mary, Mother of God, but is still celebrated by Old Catholics and also by traditionalist Catholics who worship according to the classical Roman Rite (that follows the General Roman Calendar promulgated in 1962). It was for many centuries combined on January 1 with the Feast of the Holy Name of Jesus, before the two were separated, and now that the Feast of the Circumcision has disappeared as such from the official Catholic calendar, the other feast may be regarded as celebrating this too.

== Relics ==
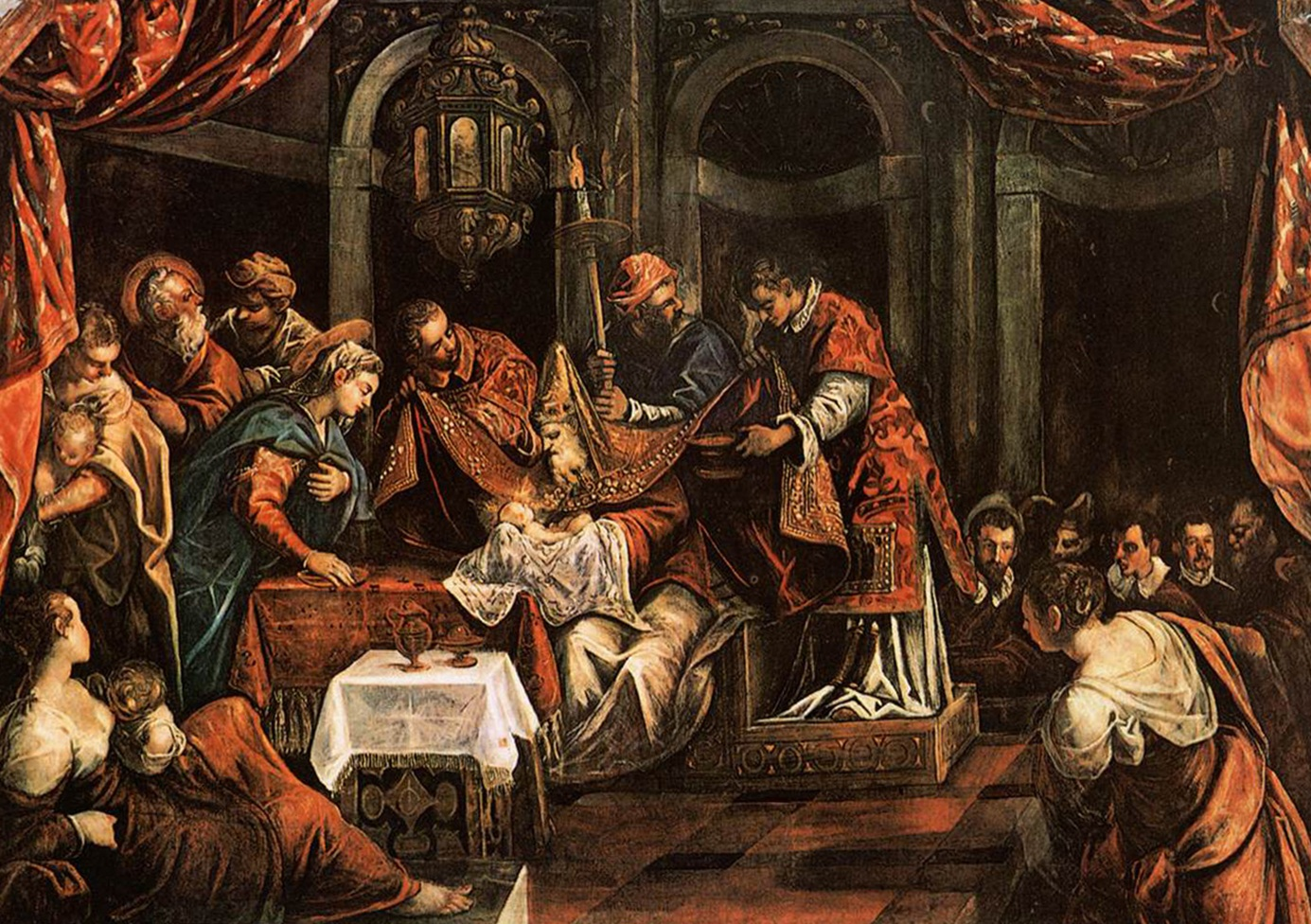
Tintoretto, from the cycle in the Scuola Grande di San Rocco

At various points in history, relics purporting to be the holy prepuce, the foreskin of Christ, have surfaced and various miraculous powers have been ascribed to it. A number of churches in Europe have claimed to possess Jesus' foreskin, sometimes at the same time. The best known was in the Lateran Basilica in Rome, whose authenticity was confirmed by a vision of Saint Bridget of Sweden. In its gold reliquary, it was looted in the Sack of Rome in 1527, but eventually recovered.

Most of the Holy Prepuces were lost or destroyed during the Reformation and the French Revolution. The Prepuce of Calcata is noteworthy, as the reliquary containing the Holy Foreskin was paraded through the streets of this Italian village as recently as 1983 on the Feast of the Circumcision, which was formerly marked by the Roman Catholic Church around the world on January 1 each year, and is now renamed as the Feast of the Holy Name of Jesus. The practice ended, however, when thieves stole the jewel-encrusted case, contents and all. Following this theft, it is unclear whether any purported Holy Prepuces still exist.

Other philosophers contended that with the Ascension of Jesus, all of his body parts – even those no longer attached – ascended as well. One, Leo Allatius, reportedly went so far as to contend that the foreskin became the rings of Saturn; however, this reference is unverifiable.

== Gallery ==
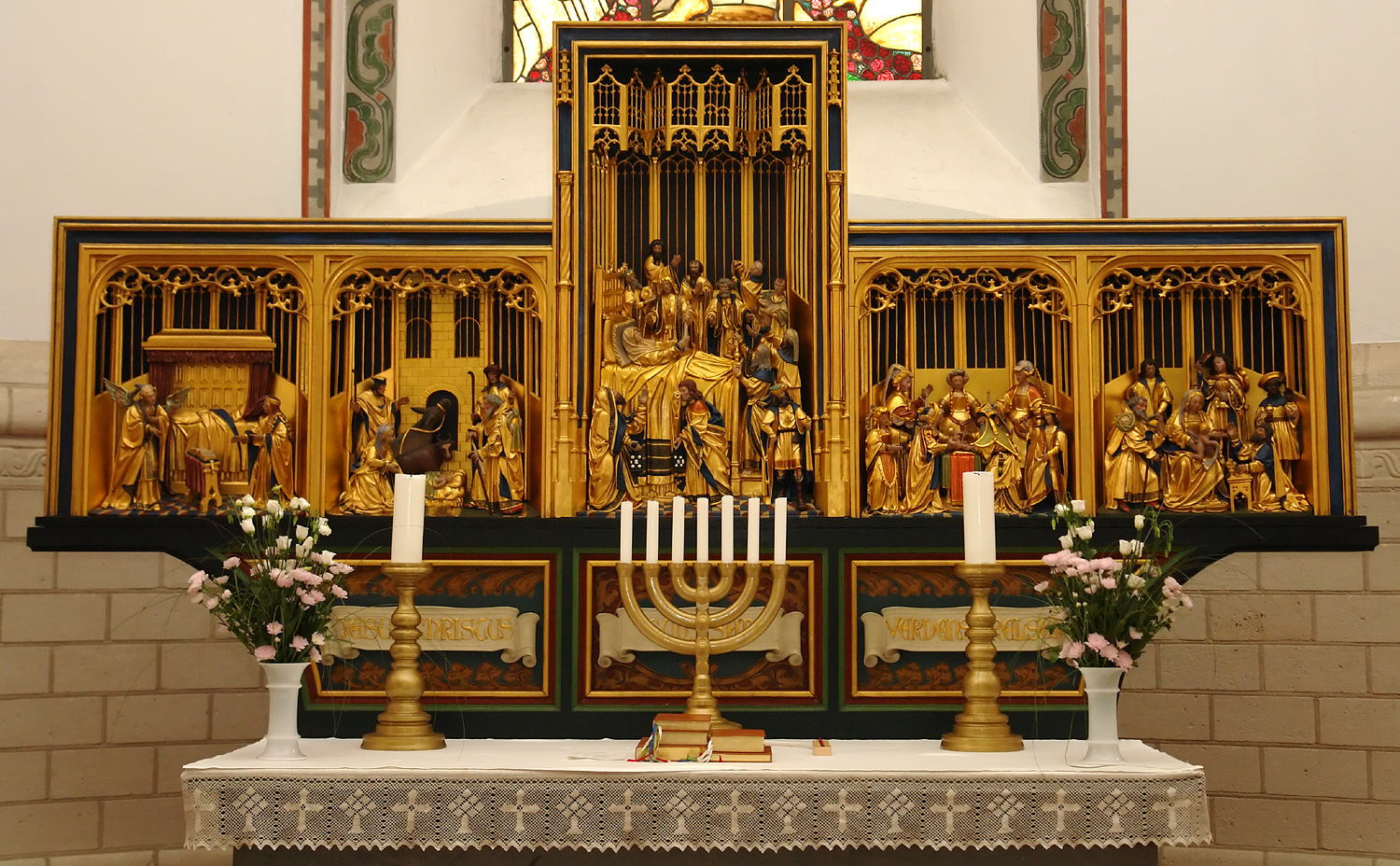
Altarpiece with scenes from the Life of the Virgin, German, 1510

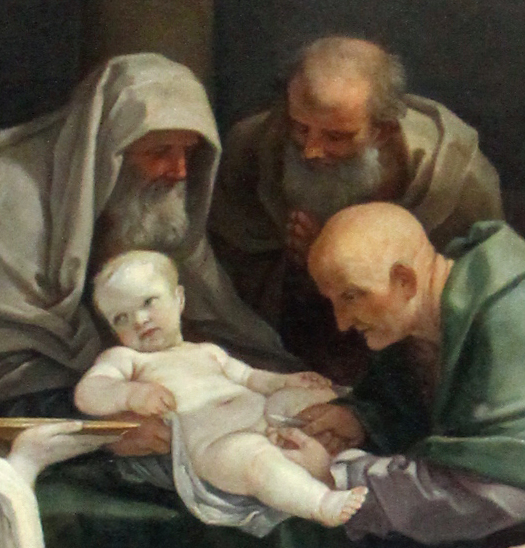
Detail of a Guido Reni painting, c. 1635–1640

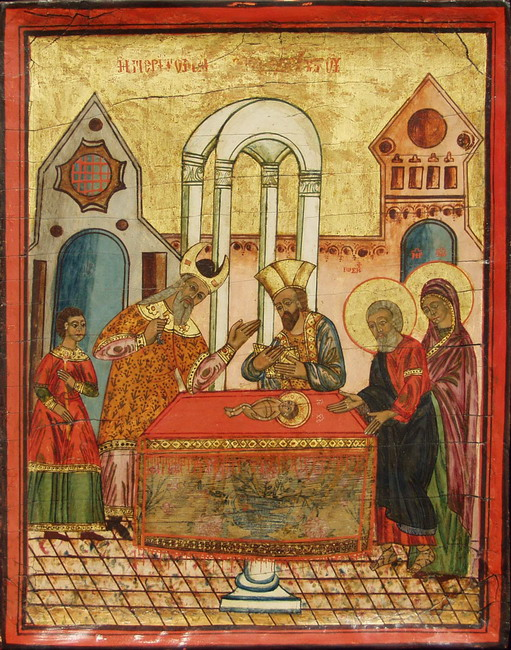
Mid-18th-century Russian icon

== See also ==
- Chronology of Jesus
- Ostentatio genitalium

== Notes ==
Circumcision of Jesus Life of Jesus
Preceded by Adoration of the Shepherds	New Testament; Events	Succeeded by Presentation of Jesus at the Temple
