= Feast of the Circumcision of Christ =

Christian celebration

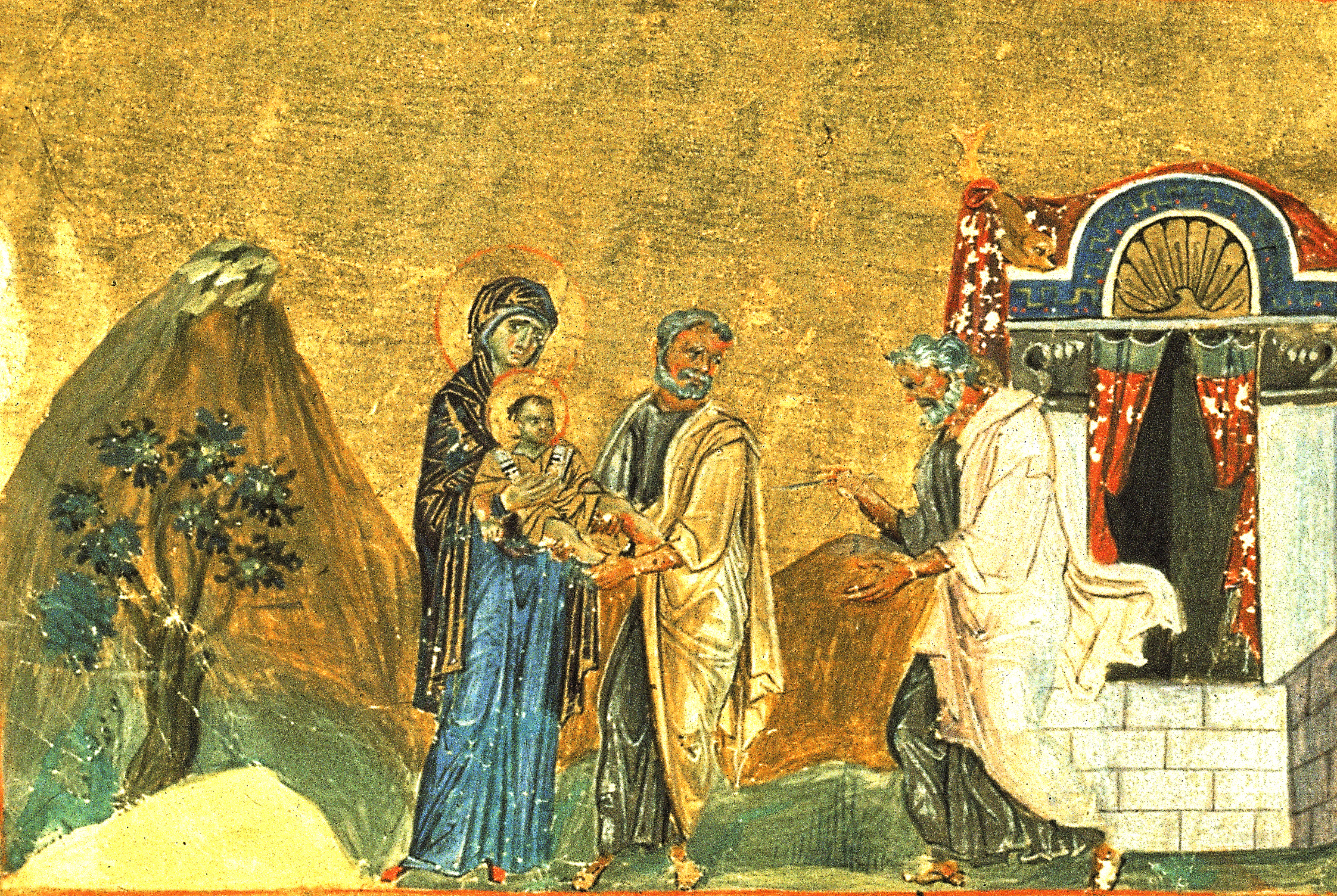
Circumcision of Christ, Menologion of Basil II, 979–984.

The Feast of the Circumcision of Christ is a Christian celebration of the circumcision of Jesus in accordance with Jewish tradition, eight days (according to the Semitic calculation of intervals of days) after his birth, the occasion on which the child was formally given his name.

The circumcision of Jesus has traditionally been seen as the first time the blood of Christ was shed, and thus the beginning of the process of the redemption of man, and a demonstration that Christ is fully human, and of his (parents') obedience to Biblical law.

The feast day appears on 1 January in the liturgical calendar of Eastern Orthodox churches, all Lutheran churches, and some churches of the Anglican Communion. In the General Roman Calendar, the 1 January feast, which from 1568 to 1960 was traditionally called "The Circumcision of the Lord and the Octave of the Nativity", is since 1969 revision the Solemnity of Mary, Mother of God, and the Octave Day of the Nativity of the Lord. In Western Christianity, the Feast of the Naming and Circumcision of Jesus Christ marks the eighth day (octave day) of Christmastide while the Synaxis of the Virgin is observed on 26 December in the Byzantine rite, in Greek Orthodox, Eastern Lutheran and Byzantine Catholic churches. Given that the Feast of the Circumcision of Christ and the Feast of the Holy Name of Jesus fall on New Year's Day, it is often observed through a Watchnight Mass that starts in the late hours of the previous day and continues into the early morning.

== Textual sources ==
And when eight days were fulfilled to circumcise the child, his name was called Jesus, the name called by the angel before he was conceived in the womb. (Luke 2:21)

== Eastern Orthodox churches ==
The feast is commonly celebrated in Russian tradition with an All-Night Vigil, beginning the evening of December 31, but the service books specify a lower rank of celebration, with separate services of Great Vespers, Little Compline, Midnight Office, and Matins and First Hour. The hymns of the feast are combined with those for Saint Basil the Great. After the Divine Liturgy the next morning, Russian churches often celebrate a New Year Moleben (service of intercession) to pray for God's blessing for the beginning of the civil New Year (Byzantine Christians commemorate the Indiction, or Ecclesiastical New Year, on September 1). Groups that celebrate the feast of the circumcision include the Coptic Orthodox Church and the Lutheran Church.

On the Julian calendar, 1 January will correspond, until 2100, to 14 January on the Gregorian Calendar. Accordingly, in Russia, 14 January in the civil calendar is known as "The Old New Year", since it corresponds to 1 January in the Julian Calendar, still used by the Church.

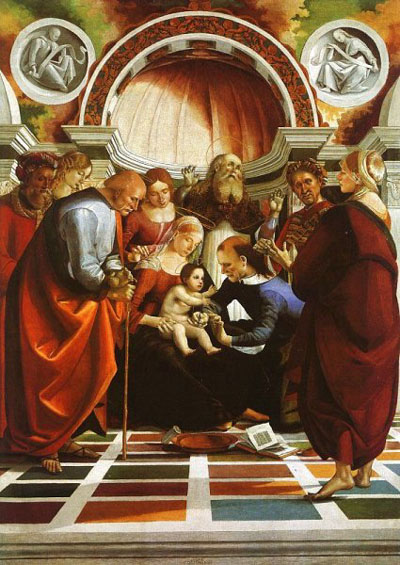
The Circumcision by Luca Signorelli (16th century)

== Latin Church ==
At an early stage, the Church in Rome celebrated on 1 January a feast that it called the anniversary (Natale) of the Mother of God. When this was overshadowed by the feasts of the Annunciation and the Assumption, adopted from Constantinople at the start of the 7th century, 1 January began to be celebrated simply as the octave day of Christmas, the "eighth day" on which, according to Luke 2:21, the child was circumcised and given the name Jesus. In the 13th or 14th century 1 January began to be celebrated in Rome, as already in Spain and Gaul, as the feast of the Circumcision of the Lord and the Octave of the Nativity, while still oriented towards Mary and Christmas. The emphasis that Saint Bernardino of Siena (1380–1444) laid on the name of Jesus in his preaching led in 1721 to the institution of a separate Feast of the Holy Name of Jesus. Pope John XXIII's General Roman Calendar of 1960 removed the mention of the Circumcision of Jesus, calling 1 January simply the Octave of the Nativity, and it appears as such in the 1962 Roman Missal. More recently, Pope Paul VI's 1969 revision states: "1 January, the Octave Day of the Nativity of the Lord, is the Solemnity of Mary, the Holy Mother of God, and also the commemoration of the conferral of the Most Holy Name of Jesus."

Traditionally, as was the case prior to the 1969 revision, the Ambrosian and the Hispanic (Mozarabic/Visigothic) Rites celebrate this day as the Circumcision of the Lord.

== Lutheran Church ==
As the Circumcision of Our Lord is a feast of Christ and related directly to the life of Christ as recounted in Holy Scripture (notably Luke 2:21), it is celebrated by Lutheran churches. It remains on Lutheran liturgical calendars to this day, although some Lutherans now use the title "The Circumcision and the Name of Jesus" or simply "The Name of Jesus". Martin Luther preached at least one notable sermon on this feast day, which is still available in his Church Postils, and most Lutheran hymnals prior to their 1978 Lutheran Book of Worship contain several hymns for the occasion.

== Anglican Communion ==
The Anglican Communion's Book of Common Prayer liturgy celebrates this day as the Circumcision of Christ.

Since 2000, the Common Worship of the Church of England has listed this day as "The Naming and Circumcision of Jesus".

The Book of Common Prayer of the Anglican Church of Canada calls it "The Octave Day of Christmas, and the Circumcision of Our Lord, being New Year's Day".

The 1979 Book of Common Prayer of the Episcopal Church (United States) names this day "The Holy Name of Our Lord Jesus Christ", a Feast of the Lord.

A Prayer Book for Australia (1995) of the Anglican Church of Australia calls it "The Naming and Circumcision of Jesus".

== See also ==
- Circumcision in the Bible
- Feast of the Holy Name of Jesus
- Holy prepuce
