= Solemnity of Mary, Mother of God =

Christian Marian feast day

Solemnity of Mary, the Holy Mother of God
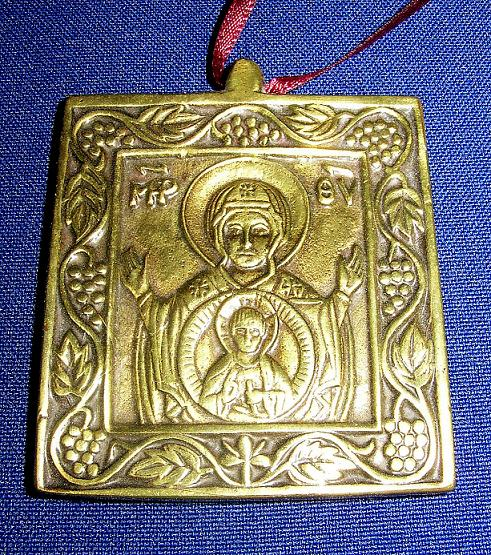
- The Blessed Virgin Mary, Μήτηρ Θεοῦ (Mētēr Theou, "Mother of God"), is poetically called Πλατυτέρα τῶν οὐρανῶν (Platytéra tōn Ouranōn, "More spacious than the heavens") because she bore in her womb the Creator of the universe.
- Also called: Octave day of Christmas (Catholic Church); Synaxis of the Theotokos (Eastern Christianity)
- Observed by: Catholic Church; Certain Evangelical-Lutheran churches; Certain Anglican churches; Churches of the Byzantine, West Syriac, and East Syriac Rites; Coptic Orthodox Church
- Type: Christian
- Significance: Motherhood of Mary
- Observances: Church services
- Date: 1 January (Catholic Roman Rite since 1969); 26 December (Byzantine, West Syriac, and East Syriac Rites); 16 January (Coptic Orthodox Church)
- Frequency: Annual
- Related to: Feast of the Circumcision of Christ

The Solemnity of Mary, the Holy Mother of God is a feast day of the Blessed Virgin Mary under the aspect of her motherhood of Jesus Christ, whom she had circumcised on the eighth day after his birth in accordance with Levitical Law. Christians see him as the Lord and Son of God.

It is celebrated since 1969 by the Roman Rite of the Catholic Church on 1 January, the Octave (8th) day of Christmastide, which previously commemorated the Circumcision and Holy Name of Jesus. This solemnity is a Holy Day of Obligation, by virtue of being the Christmas Octave celebration, in areas that have not abrogated it. Given that the Solemnity of Mary, Mother of God falls on New Year's Day, the Watchnight Mass remains a popular tradition that starts in the late hours of the previous day and continues into the early morning. The Eastern Orthodox Church,, along with Christians of Byzantine, West Syriac, and East Syriac Rites celebrate Mary as the Mother of God on 26 December (also known as the Synaxis of the Theotokos), while the Coptic Church (an Oriental Orthodox church) does so on 16 January.

Traditional Catholics, the Lutheran Church and the Anglican Communion, observe the Feast of the Circumcision of Christ and the Holy Name of Jesus on 1 January. In the Traditional Catholic calendar and Western Rite Vicariate of the Antiochian Orthodox Church is a feast of the Motherhood of the Blessed Virgin Mary on 11 October.

== Significance ==
The feast is a celebration of Mary being the mother of Jesus. The English title "Mother of God" is a literal translation of the Latin title Mater Dei, which in turn is a rendering of the Greek title Θεοτόκος (Theotokos), meaning "Bearer of God" dogmatically adopted by the First Council of Ephesus (431) as an assertion of the divinity of Christ.

== History ==
The Second Vatican Council stated: "Clearly from earliest times the Blessed Virgin is honoured under the title of Mother of God," and at an early stage the Church in Rome celebrated on 1 January a feast that it called the anniversary (Natale) of the Mother of God. When this was overshadowed by the feasts of the Annunciation and the Assumption, adopted from Constantinople at the start of the 7th century, 1 January began to be celebrated simply as the octave day of Christmas, the "eighth day" on which, according to Luke 2:21, the child was circumcised and given the name Jesus.

In the 13th or 14th century, 1 January began to be celebrated in Rome, as already in Spain and Gaul, as the feast of the Circumcision of the Lord and the Octave of the Nativity, while still oriented towards Mary and Christmas, with many prayers, antiphons and responsories glorifying the maternity of Mary. Pope John XXIII's General Roman Calendar of 1960 removed mention of the circumcision and called 1 January simply the "Octave of the Nativity".

=== Feast of the Maternity of the Blessed Virgin Mary ===
The feast of the Maternity of the Blessed Virgin Mary was first granted, on the petition of King Joseph I of Portugal, to the dioceses of Portugal and to Brasil and Algeria, 22 January 1751, together with the feast of the Purity of Mary, and was assigned to the first Sunday in May. In the following year, both feasts were extended to the province of Venice, in 1778 to the kingdom of Naples, and 1807 to Tuscany. In the Roman Breviary the Feast of the Maternity was commemorated on the second Sunday, and the Feast of the Purity on the third, Sunday in October. At Mesagne in Apulia it was kept 20 February in commemoration of an earthquake in 1743. This particular feast was not included in the universal calendar of the church, and was therefore adopted only in some dioceses. By 1914, the feast was established in Portugal for celebration on 11 October and extended to the entire Church by Pope Pius XI in 1931.

==== Madonna del Parto ====
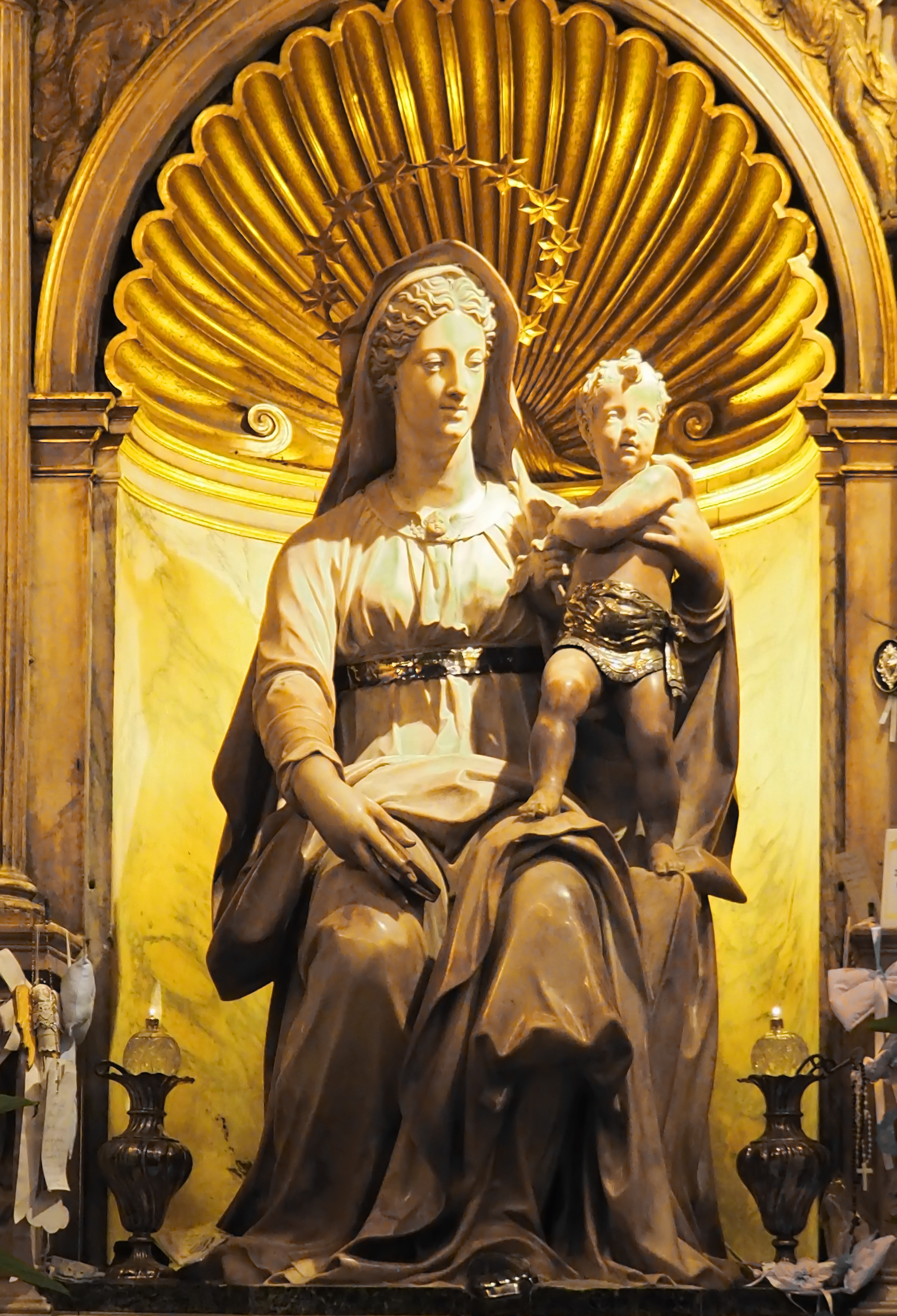
S Agostino Madonna del Parto

In Rome, in the Basilica of Saint Augustine, the Feast of the Maternity of the Blessed Virgin Mary was celebrated with an octave, in honour of the miraculous statue of the Madonna del Parto by Jacopo Sansovino. For centuries, the people of Rome and its environs have invoked the intercession of the Madonna before this statue asking for safe deliveries and healthy babies. The statue is laden with thanksgiving ex-votos and always surrounded by offerings of flowers and candles, and often photographs of smiling infants and toddlers, "visual evidence of faith in holy intercession".

==== Our Lady of Good Remedy ====
This feast was also the titular feast of the Trinitarians. In 1198, John of Matha founded the Order of the Most Holy Trinity with the mission of ransoming captive Christians. To this end, he placed the order's fundraising efforts under the patronage of Mary. In gratitude for her assistance, he then honored Mary with the title of "Our Lady of Good Remedy" (Nuestra Señora de los Remedios). This feast day is now celebrated on 8 October.

=== Mysterii Paschalis ===
The 1969 revision of the liturgical year and the calendar in the Roman Rite states: "1 January, the Octave Day of the Nativity of the Lord, is the Solemnity of Mary, the Holy Mother of God, and also the commemoration of the conferral of the Most Holy Name of Jesus." This new solemnity occurs after the replacement of the traditional celebration of the Circumcision of Jesus on that day. It deleted the 11 October feast, even for Portugal, stating: "The Maternity of the Blessed Virgin Mary is celebrated on 1 January in the Solemnity of Mary, the Mother of God." The 11 October feast is still celebrated by Traditionalist Catholic groups who use the General Roman Calendar of 1960.

=== Marialis Cultus ===
In his Apostolic Letter Marialis Cultus, Pope Paul VI explained: "This celebration, placed on January 1 ...is meant to commemorate the part played by Mary in this mystery of salvation. It is meant also to exalt the singular dignity which this mystery brings to the 'holy Mother...through whom we were found worthy to receive the Author of life.' It is likewise a fitting occasion for renewing adoration of the newborn Prince of Peace, for listening once more to the glad tidings of the angels (cf. Lk. 2:14), and for imploring from God, through the Queen of Peace, the supreme gift of peace."

== See also ==
- Feast of the Circumcision of Christ
- Madonna del Parto as an iconic motif
- Mother of God (Roman Catholic)
