= Supremi disciplinae =

Supremi disciplinae was a motu proprio released on 2 July 1911 by Pope Pius X that reduced the number of holy days of obligation within the Roman Catholic Church. It reduced the number of such non-Sunday holy days from 36 to 8. The present list was established in 1917.
