= Holy day of obligation =

In the Catholic Church, holy days of obligation or days of precept are days on which Catholic Christians are expected to attend Mass, and engage in rest from work and recreation (i.e., they are to refrain from engaging in work or activities that hinder the worship owed to God), according to the third commandment.

The expectation is attached to the holy day, even if transferred to another date, as sometimes happens in the Roman Rite. However, in some countries a dispensation is granted in such circumstances.

== Latin Church ==
The holy days of obligation for Latin Church Catholics are indicated in canon 1246 of the 1983 Code of Canon Law:

Can. 1246. §1. Sunday, on which—by apostolic tradition—the paschal mystery is celebrated, must be observed in the universal Church as the primordial holy day of obligation. The following days must also be observed: the Nativity of our Lord Jesus Christ, the Epiphany, the Ascension, the Body and Blood of Christ, Holy Mary the Mother of God, her Immaculate Conception, her Assumption, Saint Joseph, Saint Peter and Saint Paul the Apostles, and All Saints. §2. With the prior approval of the Apostolic See, however, the conference of bishops can suppress some of the holy days of obligation or transfer them to a Sunday.

Placed in the order of the liturgical calendar, the ten days (apart from Sundays) that this canon mentions are:

- 8 December: Solemnity of the Immaculate Conception of the Blessed Virgin Mary
- 25 December: Solemnity of the Nativity of the Lord (Christmas)
- 1 January: Solemnity of Mary, the Holy Mother of God
- 6 January: Solemnity of the Epiphany of the Lord
- 19 March: Solemnity of Saint Joseph, Spouse of the Blessed Virgin Mary
- Thursday of the sixth week of Eastertide: Solemnity of the Ascension of the Lord
- Thursday after Trinity Sunday: Solemnity of the Most Holy Body and Blood of Christ (Corpus Christi)
- 29 June: Solemnity of Saints Peter and Paul, Apostles
- 15 August: Solemnity of the Assumption of the Blessed Virgin Mary
- 1 November: Solemnity of All Saints

There used to be many more holy days of obligation. With the motu proprio of 2 July 1911, Supremi disciplinae, Pope Pius X reduced the number of such non-Sunday holy days from 36 to 8: the above 10 dates (1 January was then the Feast of the Circumcision of Christ) minus the feasts the Body and Blood of Christ, and Saint Joseph. The present list was established in canon 1247 of the 1917 Code of Canon Law, now canon 1246 of the current Code of Canon Law.

Even before the time of Pius X, the bishops in many countries had obtained the Holy See's approval to diminish the number of non-Sunday holy days of obligation, making the total fewer than 36. Today too, episcopal conferences have availed themselves of the authority granted to them to reduce such days to the ten mentioned above.

Non-Sunday holy days of obligation all have the rank of solemnity. Accordingly, if in Ordinary Time one of them falls on a Sunday, the Sunday celebration gives way to it; but the Sundays of Advent, Lent and Eastertide take precedence over all other solemnities, which are then transferred to another day, along with the precept to attend Mass. Occasionally, the Feast of the Sacred Heart may fall on Ss. Peter and Paul's feast day, in which case it takes precedence over the Solemnity of Ss. Peter and Paul; the precept then applies to the feast of the Sacred Heart.

=== Working holy days ===
While episcopal conferences may suppress holy days of obligation or transfer them to a Sunday, some of them have maintained as holy days of obligation some days that are not public holidays. For most people, such days are normal working days, and they therefore cannot observe the obligation "to abstain from those works and affairs which hinder the worship to be rendered to God, the joy proper to the Lord's day, or the suitable relaxation of mind and body". However, the faithful remain bound by the obligation to participate in Mass. For these days, colloquially referred to as "working holy days", churches may have a special schedule, with Mass available outside the normal working hours or on the preceding evening. In times past, holy days would often be referred to as days of single or double precept, with those of double precept requiring the faithful to both attend Mass and to abstain from servile works, whereas days of single precept would permit servile work.

In Ireland, the only holy days of obligation that are also public holidays are Christmas and Saint Patrick's Day. Thus, there are five working holy days. Similarly, Slovakia has four holy days of obligation that are also public holidays: Christmas, Solemnity of Mary Mother of God, Epiphany, and All Saints', leaving it with five working holy days. In the Netherlands, the bishops conference decreed that, with effect from 1 January 1991, the feasts of the Assumption and All Saints, each of which it had previously decided to celebrate on the following Sunday, were to be of obligation as regards Mass, but not for abstaining from work.

=== Observance by country ===
In Vatican City, but not in the rest of the Diocese of Rome, Sundays and all 10 days listed in canon 1246 are observed as holy days of obligation. This is also the case in the Diocese of Lugano (covering the Swiss canton of Ticino), but perhaps nowhere else.

Some countries have as holy days of obligation feasts that are not among those listed in canon 1246. Ireland has Saint Patrick's Day. Germany and Hungary have Saint Stephen on the "Second Christmas Day" (26 December), Easter Monday, and Pentecost Monday (Whit Monday).

In countries where they are not holy days of obligation, three of the ten feast days listed above are assigned to a Sunday as their proper day:

- The Feast of the Epiphany to the Sunday that falls between 2 and 8 January; if 6 January falls on Sunday there is no B date,
- The Feast of the Ascension of Our Lord, which always falls on a Thursday, to the following Sunday;
- The Solemnity of the Most Holy Body and Blood of Christ to the following Sunday.

If they are thus assigned to a Sunday, they are not included in the following national lists of holy days of obligation, since "in every country all Sundays are holy days of obligation".

==== Andorra ====
- Epiphany
- Assumption of the Blessed Virgin Mary
- Birth of our Lady
- All Saints' Day
- Immaculate Conception of the Blessed Virgin Mary
- Christmas

==== Argentina ====
- Solemnity of Mary, Mother of God
- Assumption of the Virgin Mary
- Immaculate Conception of the Virgin Mary
- Christmas

==== Australia ====
- Assumption of the Blessed Virgin Mary
- Christmas

==== Austria ====
- Solemnity of Mary, Mother of God
- Epiphany
- Feast of the Ascension
- The Body and Blood of Christ
- Assumption of the Blessed Virgin Mary
- All Saints' Day
- Immaculate Conception of the Blessed Virgin Mary
- Christmas

==== Bahrain ====
- Solemnity of Mary, Mother of God
- St Thomas
- Assumption of the Blessed Virgin Mary
- Birth of our Lady
- Christmas

==== Belgium ====
- Feast of the Ascension
- Assumption of the Blessed Virgin Mary
- All Saints' Day
- Christmas

The four days mentioned above have been Belgium's holy days of obligation since the concordat of 1801 (which itself is not recognized as legally binding in Belgium since independence). Therefore, the current system is in force because of canon 5 of the 1983 Code of Canon Law, as was recognized by the Episcopal Conference of Belgium on 28 October 1986.

==== Brazil ====
- Solemnity of Mary, Mother of God
- The Body and Blood of Christ
- Immaculate Conception of the Virgin Mary
- Christmas

==== Brunei ====
- Feast of the Ascension
- Assumption of the Blessed Virgin Mary
- All Saints' Day
- Christmas

==== Canada ====
- Solemnity of Mary, Mother of God
- Christmas

==== Chile ====
- Assumption of the Virgin Mary
- All Saints' Day
- Immaculate Conception of the Virgin Mary
- Christmas

==== China ====
Since the 1950s, China has not had a bishops' conference recognized by the Holy See. The current bishops' conference of China does not include all of the bishops of the country, as 'underground' bishops without state approval are not included. Possessing a recognized bishops' conference is a prerequisite in canon law for moving feast days or removing their obligation on a permanent basis, as the bishops' conference must receive permission from the Holy See to do either. Otherwise bishops and pastors only have the authority to suspend an obligation on a case-by-case basis. An online source published by the Archdiocese of Beijing recites the canon law verbatim (including all 10 feast days in the general calendar) in answer to the question of 'what feast days must be observed' without any mention of days that are cancelled or moved.

However, this situation only exists in mainland China. In the Diocese of Hong Kong, Christmas is the only holy day of obligation. The same seems to be true for Taiwan. In the diocese of Macau, the holy days of obligations are the Immaculate Conception of the Blessed Virgin Mary, Christmas, and the Solemnity of Mary, Mother of God.

==== Colombia ====
- Solemnity of Mary, Mother of God
- Immaculate Conception of the Virgin Mary
- Christmas

==== Croatia ====
- Feast of Corpus Christi
- Assumption of the Blessed Virgin Mary
- All Saints' Day
- Christmas

==== Czech Republic ====
- Solemnity of Mary, Mother of God
- Christmas

In Czech Republic, holy days of obligation are, by Czech Bishops' Conference, reduced to only two days, which are also public holidays in the Czech Republic' Since the other holy days of obligation mentioned in the Code of Canon Law are not public holidays, the Czech Bishops' Conference does not make attendance at Mass obligatory for Catholics, but only recommends it, as it does also on the feast days of Saints Cyril and Methodius (5 July) and Saint Wenceslas (28 September). Attendance at Mass is of course obligatory on all Sundays.

==== Denmark ====
Includes Faroe Islands and Greenland.

- Feast of the Ascension
- Christmas

==== Dominican Republic ====
- Solemnity of Mary, Mother of God
- Epiphany
- Feast of Corpus Christi
- Christmas
- Feast of Our Lady of Altagracia
- Feast of Our Lady of Mercy

==== El Salvador ====
- Solemnity of Mary, Mother of God
- Epiphany
- Feast of Corpus Christi
- Christmas

==== England and Wales ====
- Epiphany
- Ascension
- Feast of Saints Peter and Paul
- Assumption of the Blessed Virgin Mary
- All Saints' Day
- Christmas

(See Liturgy Office.)

According to a 1984 decision of the Catholic Bishops' Conference of England and Wales, holydays which fall on a Saturday or a Monday (with the exception of Christmas) are transferred to the adjacent Sunday. In 2006, the Epiphany, Ascension and Corpus Christi were transferred to the nearest Sunday. On 17 November 2016 meeting in Leeds, the Bishops' Conference determined that the Epiphany and the Ascension should be celebrated on their official days, or on the adjacent Sunday when 6 January is a Saturday or a Monday. This decision was approved by the Congregation for Divine Worship and the Discipline of the Sacraments and became effective from 3 December 2017.

There are different regulations for Scotland and for Ireland.

==== Finland ====
- Solemnity of Mary, Mother of God
- Epiphany
- Feast of the Ascension
- Christmas

(See Catholic Church in Finland: Practical Matters.)

==== France ====
- Feast of the Ascension
- Assumption of the Blessed Virgin Mary
- All Saints' Day
- Christmas

==== Germany ====
- Solemnity of Mary, Mother of God
- Feast of the Ascension
- Christmas
- Easter Monday
- Pentecost Monday
- Saint Stephen's Day or (Second Christmas Day)

In addition, some federal states with a high percentage of Catholic people have one or more of the following holy days of obligation:

- Epiphany
- Solemnity of the Most Holy Body and Blood of Christ
- Assumption of the Blessed Virgin Mary (observed only in some regions of Bavaria as a holy day of obligation)
- All Saints' Day

The solemnities of the Immaculate Conception of Mary, of St. Joseph, and of Ss. Peter and Paul are not observed in any German diocese as holy days of obligation.

==== Greece ====
- Solemnity of Mary, Mother of God
- Epiphany
- Assumption of the Blessed Virgin Mary
- Christmas

Instead of being transferred to the following Sunday, the Feast of the Ascension of Our Lord, though not a holy day of obligation in Greece, is kept on the Thursday of the sixth week of Easter, in order to celebrate it on the same day as the Orthodox Church of Greece.

==== Haiti ====
- Epiphany
- All Saints Day
- Christmas

==== Hungary ====
- Solemnity of Mary, Mother of God
- Epiphany
- Assumption of the Blessed Virgin Mary
- All Saints' Day
- Christmas

==== Iceland ====
- Solemnity of Mary, Mother of God
- Feast of the Ascension
- All Saints' Day
- Christmas

==== India ====
- Assumption of Mary
- Christmas
- Feast of St. Thomas the Apostle(Dhukrana or St.Thomas day)

==== Indonesia ====
- Solemnity of Mary, Mother of God
- Epiphany move to the nearest Sunday between 2–8 January
- Saint Joseph's Day although not a public holiday
- Good Friday
- Feast of the Ascension
- Corpus Christi moved to the Sunday after Trinity Sunday
- Feast of Saints Peter and Paul although not a public holiday
- Assumption of the Blessed Virgin Mary used to be a public holiday but not longer, so moved to the Sunday between 12 and 18 August
- All Saints Day although not a public holiday
- Feast of the Immaculate Conception although not a public holiday
- Christmas

Bishops' Conference of Indonesia has not issued regulation about holy day of obligation, so ten holy days on Can. 1246 § 1 applied.

==== Ireland ====
includes the entire island of Ireland, i.e. both the Republic of Ireland and Northern Ireland.

- Epiphany
- Assumption of the Blessed Virgin Mary
- All Saints' Day
- Immaculate Conception of the Virgin Mary
- Christmas
- Saint Patrick's Day

(See "Working holy days", above)

In 1917 Birth of our Lady was dropped. In 1960's feasts of Solemnity of Mary, Mother of God and Feast of Saints Peter and Paul were removed. In October 1996 from 1997 Ascension and Corpus Christi were transferred from Thursday to Sunday following a This decision has been confirmed by the Vatican Congregation for Divine Worship.

==== Italy ====
- Solemnity of Mary, Mother of God
- Epiphany
- Assumption of the Blessed Virgin Mary
- All Saints' Day
- Immaculate Conception of the Virgin Mary
- Christmas

==== Japan ====
- Solemnity of Mary, Mother of God
- Assumption of the Blessed Virgin Mary
- Christmas

==== Kenya ====
- Solemnity of Mary, Mother of God
- Assumption of the Blessed Virgin Mary
- All Saints Day
- Christmas

==== Korea ====
includes the entire Korean Peninsula, including both North and South Korea.

- Solemnity of Mary, Mother of God
- Assumption of the Blessed Virgin Mary
- Christmas

==== Kuwait ====
- Solemnity of Mary, Mother of God
- St Thomas
- Assumption of the Blessed Virgin Mary
- Birth of our Lady
- Christmas

==== Lebanon ====
- Epiphany
- Feast of the Ascension
- Assumption of the Blessed Virgin Mary
- All Saints Day
- Immaculate Conception of Blessed Virgin Mary
- Christmas

==== Liechtenstein ====
- Epiphany
- Feast of the Ascension
- Birth of our Lady
- All Saints' Day
- Immaculate Conception of the Blessed Virgin Mary
- Christmas

==== Luxembourg ====
- Feast of the Ascension
- Assumption of the Blessed Virgin Mary
- All Saints' Day
- Christmas

==== Malta ====
- Saint Joseph's Day
- Feast of Saints Peter and Paul
- Assumption of the Blessed Virgin Mary
- Immaculate Conception of Virgin Mary
- Christmas
- The Shipwreck of Saint Paul in Malta on 10 February

==== Malaysia ====
- Feast of the Ascension
- Assumption of the Blessed Virgin Mary
- All Saints' Day
- Christmas

==== Mexico ====
- Solemnity of Mary, Mother of God
- The Body and Blood of Christ
- Christmas
- Our Lady of Guadalupe

==== Moldova ====
- Epiphany
- Christmas Day
- Saint Stephen's Day

==== Netherlands ====
- Solemnity of Mary, Mother of God
- Feast of the Ascension
- Assumption of the Blessed Virgin Mary
- All Saints' Day
- Christmas

(See "Working holy days", above)

==== New Zealand ====
- Assumption of the Blessed Virgin Mary
- Christmas

==== Nicaragua ====
- Solemnity of Mary, Mother of God
- The Body and Blood of Christ
- Immaculate Conception of the Virgin Mary
- Christmas

==== Nigeria ====
- Feast of the Ascension
- Assumption of the Blessed Virgin Mary
- All Saints' Day
- Christmas

==== Norway ====
- Feast of the Ascension
- Christmas Day

==== Palestine ====
- Epiphany
- Assumption of the Virgin Mary
- Inmaculate Conception of the Virgin Mary
- Christmas

==== Panama ====
- Solemnity of Mary, Mother of God
- Immaculate Conception of the Virgin Mary
- Christmas

==== Paraguay ====
- Solemnity of Mary, Mother of God
- Assumption of the Blessed Virgin Mary
- Immaculate Conception of the Virgin Mary
- Christmas

==== Peru ====
- Feast of Saints Peter and Paul
- The Feast of St. Rose of Lima
- All Saints' Day
- Immaculate Conception of the Virgin Mary
- Christmas

==== Philippines ====
- Solemnity of Mary, Mother of God
- Solemnity of the Immaculate Conception
- Christmas

==== Poland ====
- Solemnity of Mary, Mother of God
- Epiphany
- The Body and Blood of Christ
- Assumption of the Blessed Virgin Mary
- All Saints' Day
- Christmas

==== Portugal ====
- Solemnity of Mary, Mother of God
- The Body and Blood of Christ
- Assumption of the Blessed Virgin Mary
- All Saints' Day
- Immaculate Conception of the Virgin Mary
- Christmas

==== Puerto Rico ====
- Solemnity of Mary, Mother of God
- Epiphany
- Christmas

==== Qatar ====
- Solemnity of Mary, Mother of God
- Thomas the Apostle
- Assumption of the Blessed Virgin Mary
- Birth of our Lady
- Christmas

==== Saudi Arabia ====
- Solemnity of Mary, Mother of God
- Assumption of the Blessed Virgin Mary
- Christmas

==== Serbia ====
- Epiphany
- Christmas

==== Scotland ====
- Feast of the Ascension
- Feast of Saints Peter and Paul
- Assumption of the Blessed Virgin Mary
- All Saints' Day
- Christmas

According to the Bishops' Conference of Scotland in 1986, holy days which fall on a Saturday or Monday (with the exception of Christmas) are transferred to the adjacent Sunday. There are separate regulations for Ireland and for England and Wales.

==== Singapore ====
- Feast of the Ascension
- Assumption of the Blessed Virgin Mary
- All Saints' Day
- Christmas

==== Slovakia ====
- Solemnity of Mary, Mother of God
- Epiphany
- Feast of the Ascension
- The Body and Blood of Christ
- Feast of Saints Peter and Paul
- Assumption of the Blessed Virgin Mary
- All Saints' Day
- Immaculate Conception of the Virgin Mary
- Christmas

All the holy days of obligation listed in the Code of Canon Law except the Solemnity of Saint Joseph are maintained in Slovakia, although only Solemnity of Mary, Epiphany, All Saints' Day and Christmas are also public holidays. See "Working holy days", above.

Additionally, the Slovak Bishops' Conference recommends Mass attendance on the following solemnities, because of their national importance:

- Saints Cyril and Methodius (celebrated on 5 July in Slovakia - public holiday)
- Our Lady of Sorrows - Patroness of Slovakia (15 September - public holiday)

==== South Africa ====
- Feast of the Ascension
- Assumption of the Blessed Virgin Mary
- Christmas

==== Spain ====
- Solemnity of Mary, Mother of God
- Epiphany
- Saint Joseph's Day
- Assumption of the Virgin Mary
- All Saints' Day
- Immaculate Conception of the Virgin Mary
- Christmas

The following is also a holy day of obligation throughout Spain:

- Saint James's Day (Patron of Spain)

==== Sri Lanka ====
- Solemnity of Mary, Mother of God
- Assumption of the Blessed Virgin Mary
- Immaculate Conception of the Virgin Mary
- Christmas

==== Sweden ====
- Solemnity of Mary, Mother of God
- Epiphany
- Feast of the Ascension
- Feast of Saints Peter and Paul
- Assumption of the Blessed Virgin Mary
- All Saints' Day
- Christmas

==== Switzerland ====
- Solemnity of Mary, Mother of God
- Epiphany
- Feast of the Ascension
- The Body and Blood of Christ
- Assumption of the Blessed Virgin Mary
- All Saints' Day
- Christmas

The following days are also holy days of obligation in Switzerland:

- Easter Monday
- Pentecost Monday
- Saint Stephen's Day (Second Christmas Day)

In the Diocese of Lugano (covering the canton of Ticino), the following three days are also holy days of obligation:

- Saint Joseph's Day
- Feast of Saints Peter and Paul
- Immaculate Conception of the Virgin Mary

This probably makes the diocese of Lugano the only diocese in the world (except for the Vatican City part of the Diocese of Rome) where all ten holy days of obligation are observed.

==== Trinidad and Tobago ====
- Solemnity of Mary, Mother of God
- Feast of Corpus Christi
- Christmas

(See Archdiocesan Office.)

==== Turkey ====
- Solemnity of Mary, Mother of God
- Epiphany
- Assumption of the Blessed Virgin Mary
- Christmas

==== Ukraine ====
- Epiphany
- Presentation of the Lord
- Annunciation of the Holy Virgin Mary
- Feast of the Ascension
- Transfiguration of the Lord
- Assumption of the Blessed Virgin Mary
- Nativity of the Blessed Virgin Mary
- Exaltation of the Holy Cross
- Presentation of Mary
- Christmas

These regulations also apply in the Russian-occupied territories of Ukraine.

==== United States ====
- Solemnity of Mary, Mother of God
- Ascension of the Lord
- Assumption of the Virgin Mary
- All Saints' Day
- Immaculate Conception of the Virgin Mary
- Christmas

In most of the United States, the Ascension is transferred to the following Sunday (which would otherwise be the Seventh Sunday of Easter). It is only celebrated as a holy day of obligation on Thursday in the ecclesiastical provinces of Boston, Hartford, New York, Omaha, and Philadelphia, as well as by members of the Personal Ordinariate of the Chair of Saint Peter.

According to a complementary norm issued by the USCCB, "Whenever January 1, the solemnity of Mary, Mother of God, or August 15, the solemnity of the Assumption, or November 1, the solemnity of All Saints, falls on a Saturday or on a Monday, the precept to attend Mass is abrogated."

In years when December 8 falls on Sunday, the Solemnity of the Immaculate Conception is normally transferred to December 9, as it is outranked by the Second Sunday of Advent. In this case, as of the Vatican's 4 September 2024 letter, the precept to attend Mass is transferred to December 9 as well. Under the 1960 Code of Rubrics, still observed by some in accordance with Summorum Pontificum, the feast of the Immaculate Conception has precedence even over an Advent Sunday and is not transferred.

In Hawaii, the Feast of the Immaculate Conception and Christmas are the only Holy Days of Obligation, as decreed by the Bishop of Honolulu in 1992, pursuant to an indult from the Holy See and as approved by the national episcopal conference.

==== Uruguay ====
- Epiphany
- Immaculate Conception of the Virgin Mary
- Christmas

==== Venezuela ====
- Solemnity of Mary, Mother of God
- Christmas

==== Vietnam ====
The Ecclesiastical Province of Hanoi observes the following four holy days of obligation, known as the "Four Seasons" (Vietnamese: Tứ Quý):

- Christmas
- Feast of the Ascension
- Assumption of Mary into Heaven
- All Saints' Day

The Ecclesiastical Provinces of Huế and of Ho Chi Minh City only observe one recurring holy day of obligation, Christmas. Individual dioceses may observe additional holy days of obligation on an ad hoc basis.

== Eastern Catholic Churches ==
The Code of Canons of the Eastern Churches (CCEO) lays down the relevant norms regarding holy days of obligations for Eastern Catholic Churches. There are five holy days of obligation, beyond Sundays, specified as common to all of the Eastern Churches:

- The Solemnity of the Nativity of the Lord (Christmas)
- The Epiphany
- The Ascension
- The Holy Apostles Peter and Paul
- The Dormition of Holy Mary, the Mother of God

The CCEO provides that only the "supreme authority" of the Church can "establish, transfer or suppress feast days and days of penance which are common to all of the Eastern Churches," although the particular law of a sui juris Church can suppress one of these days or transfer it to Sunday, provided that said particular law has been approved by the Apostolic See. The authority competent to establish the particular law of a sui iuris Church may constitute, transfer, or suppress other feast days and days of penance (i.e., ones that are not common to all the Eastern Churches), under certain conditions.

The faithful of the Eastern Catholic Churches "are bound by the obligation to participate on Sundays and feast days in the Divine Liturgy or, according to the prescriptions or legitimate customs of their own Church sui iuris, in the celebration of the divine praises."

== See also ==
- Principal Feast
- Principal Holy Day
- Moveable feast
- Ash Wednesday
- Lord's Day
