= Feast of the Holy Name of Jesus =

Feast of the Christian liturgical year

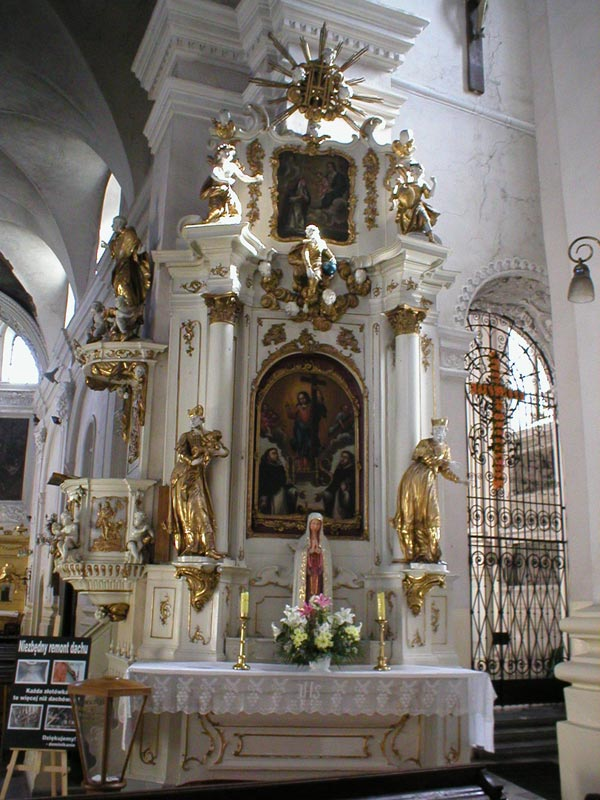
Altar of the Holy Name of Jesus, with the IHS monogram at the top, Lublin, Poland.

The Feast of the Holy Name of Jesus is a feast of the liturgical year celebrated by Christians on varying dates.

In the Evangelical-Lutheran and Anglican branches of Christianity, given that the Feast of the Circumcision of Christ and the Feast of the Holy Name of Jesus fall on New Year's Day, it is often observed through a Watchnight Mass that starts in the late hours of New Year's Eve and continues into the early morning of New Year's Day.

== History ==
The feast of the Holy Name of Jesus has been celebrated in the Roman Catholic Church, at least at local levels, since the end of the fifteenth century. The celebration has been held on different dates, usually in January, because 1 January, eight days after Christmas, commemorates the naming of the child Jesus; as recounted in the Gospel read on that day, "at the end of eight days, when he was circumcised, he was called Jesus, the name given by the angel before he was conceived in the womb." Medieval Catholicism, and many Christian churches to the present day, therefore celebrated both events as the Feast of the Circumcision of Christ, usually on 1 January. An Office and Mass were approved by Pope Sixtus IV.

Observance of the feast was officially granted to the Franciscans in 1530 and spread over a great part of the Church. The Franciscans, Carmelites, and Augustinians kept the feast on 14 January, the Dominicans on 15 January. At Salisbury, York, and Durham in England, and at Aberdeen in Scotland it was celebrated on 7 August, at Liège (now in Belgium) on 31 January, at Compostela in Spain and Cambrai in France on 8 January.

Around 1643 the Carthusians were granted permission to celebrate the feast on the second Sunday after the Epiphany. This was the date assigned to the celebration when, on 20 December 1721, it was inserted into the General Calendar of the Roman Rite by Pope Innocent XIII. In the reform of Pope Pius X, enacted by his motu proprio Abhinc duos annos of 23 October 1913, it was moved to the Sunday between 2 and 5 January inclusive, and in years when no such Sunday existed the celebration was observed on 2 January; this is still observed by Catholics following the 1962 calendar.

The reform of the General Roman Calendar by the motu proprio Mysterii Paschalis of 14 February 1969 removed the feast "since the imposition of the name of Jesus is already commemorated in the office of the Octave of Christmas." However, a newly composed Mass formulary of the Holy Name of Jesus was placed among the Votive Masses. The celebration was restored to the General Roman Calendar on 3 January with the promulgation of a revised edition of the Roman Missal in 2002. On this occasion an entirely new Mass formulary was composed for use on the memorial day, while the 1970 votive Mass formulary was kept unchanged. Catholics using the 1962 Missal of St. John XXIII still observe the celebration on 2 January with the corresponding texts there prescribed.

== Present day ==
In the Roman Rite of the Catholic Church, the festivity is celebrated on 3 January as the Most Holy Name of Jesus, with the rank of optional memorial. The Jesuits celebrate the Holy Name of Jesus on 3 January as the order's titular solemnity, and Catholics more generally dedicate the entire month of January to the Holy Name of Jesus.

In the Lutheran Church, the Feast of the Holy Name of Jesus is sometimes celebrated as a part of the Feast of the Circumcision of Christ on 1 January.

In some Anglican churches including the Episcopal Church (United States), the feast is observed on 1 January. In the Book of Common Prayer of the Episcopal Church of the United States of America since 1979, the Feast of the Circumcision of Christ celebrated on 1 January is now listed as the "Feast of the Holy Name of Our Lord Jesus Christ". In the Church of England, the calendar of the 1662 Book of Common Prayer stipulates a festival "The Name of Jesus" to be observed on 7 August (as had been the practice at Salisbury, Durham, and York, but in the more recent Common Worship resources the Feast of the Circumcision and Naming of Christ (1 January) takes its place as the primary festival of the name of Jesus. The Anglican Church of Canada's 'Book of Common Prayer' (1962) retains the date of 7 August, but as a commemoration, not a feast day. Many Eastern Churches celebrate the feast on 1 January.

The United Methodist Church observes the Feast of the Holy Name of Jesus on 1 January, with the liturgical colour of the day being white/gold.

The Presbyterian Church (USA) observes the Feast of the Holy Name of Jesus on 1 January.

In Western Rite Orthodoxy, the feast is celebrated on 7 August.

== See also ==
- Litany of the Holy Name
- Feast of the Circumcision of Christ
- Feasts of Jesus Christ
- Solemnity of Mary, Mother of God
