= Sisters of the Name of Jesus =

Roman Catholic religious order

The Sisters of the Name of Jesus were a Roman Catholic religious order founded in France during the nineteenth century in the Archdiocese of Besançon It was dedicated to teaching and caring for the sick.
