= Holy Name of Jesus =

Christian devotion

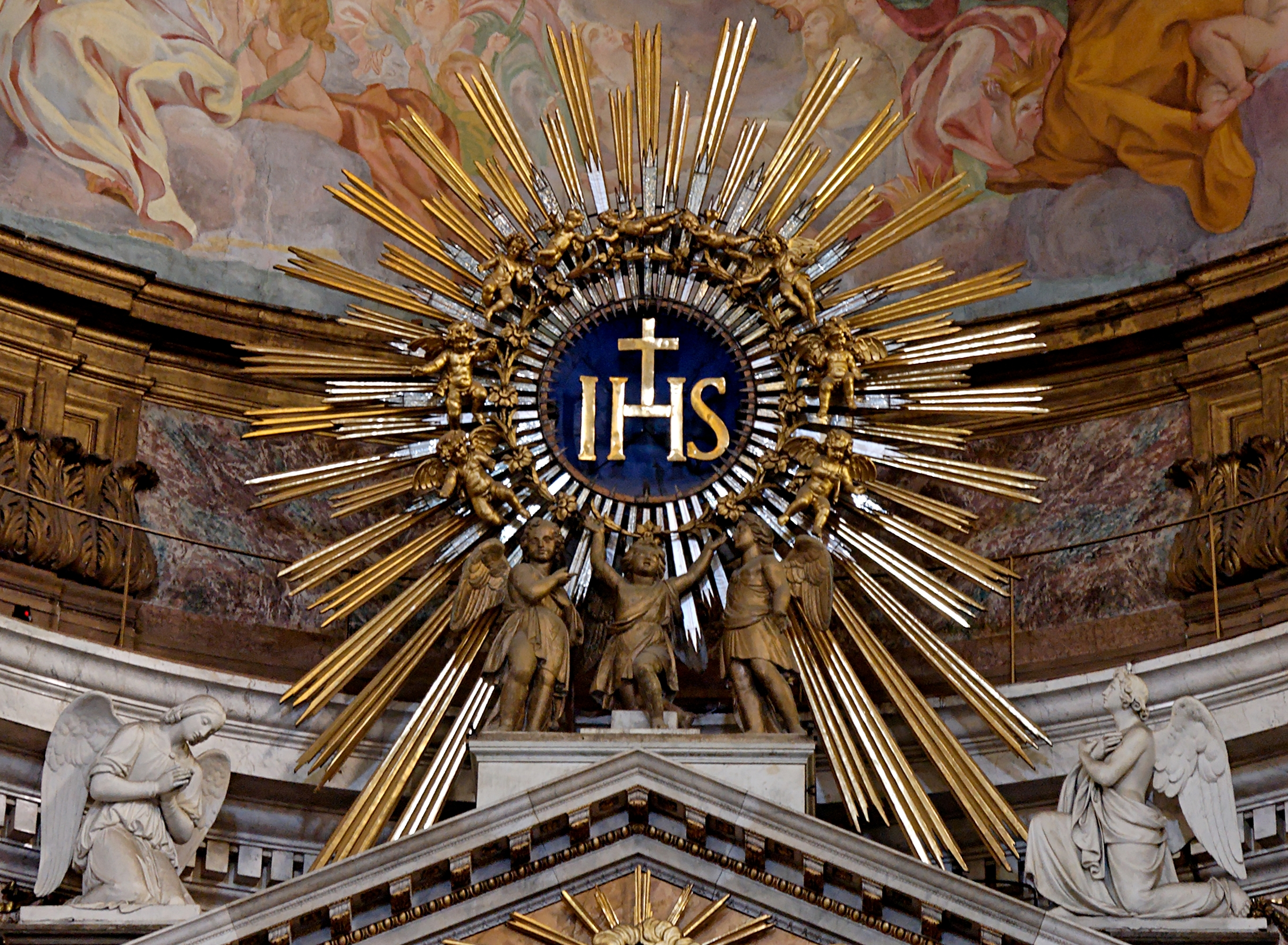
IHS monogram, with kneeling angels, atop the main altar, Church of the Gesù, Rome

In Catholicism, the veneration of the Holy Name of Jesus (also Most Holy Name of Jesus, Italian: Santissimo Nome di Gesù) developed as a separate type of devotion in the early modern period, in parallel to that of the Sacred Heart. The Litany of the Holy Name is a Roman-rite Catholic prayer, probably of the 15th century (Bernardino of Siena and John of Capistrano). The Feast of the Holy Name of Jesus was introduced in 1530.

The veneration of Nomina sacra in the form of variants of the Christogram has a tradition going back to early Christianity. Related practices of devotion exist in Eastern Christianity (cf. Jesus Prayer). The feast day is celebrated either as the Feast of the Holy Name of Jesus or as that of Circumcision of Jesus, in various Christian churches.

== Biblical background ==
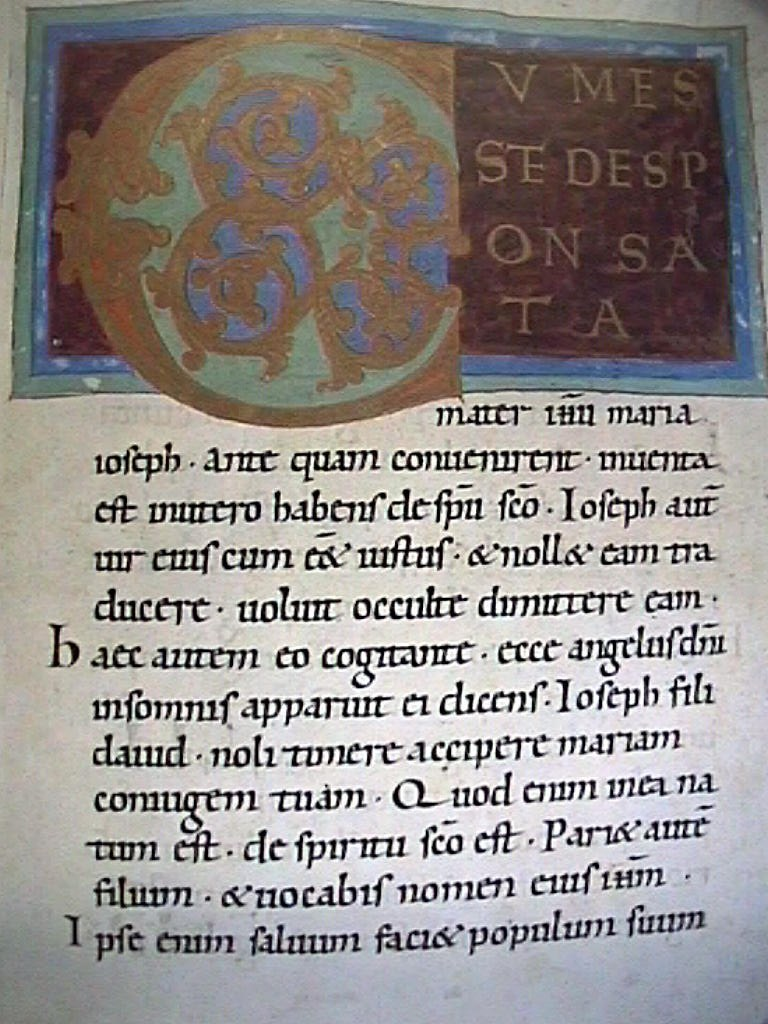
An 11th-century Gospel of Matthew (1:18–21), with Matthew 1:21 which indicates "Jesus as the saviour"

For centuries, Christians have invoked the Holy Name, and have believed that there is intrinsic power in the name of Jesus.

In the New Testament accounts, the name was assigned to Jesus by divine command.

In Luke 1:31, the angel Gabriel tells Mary "Behold, you will conceive in your womb and bear a son, and you shall name him Jesus."

In Matthew 1:21 during Joseph's first dream the angel instructs Joseph: "you shall call his name Jesus, for he will save his people from their sins". It is the only place in the New Testament where "saves his people" appears with "sins". The significance is underscored by the fact that Matthew pays more attention to the name of the child and its theological implications than the actual birth event itself. Matthew 1:21 provides the beginnings of the Christology of the name Jesus. At once it achieves the two goals of affirming Jesus as the saviour and emphasizing that the name was not selected at random, but based on a Heavenly command.

Matthew then specifically mentions the prophecy of Isaiah 7:14, "All this took place to fulfill what the Lord had said through the prophet: 'Behold, the virgin shall be with child and bear a son, and they shall name him Emmanuel,' which means 'God is with us.'" The name Emmanuel appears in Matthew 1:23, when the author specifically connects Jesus to the Old Testament prophecy. The name Emmanuel does not appear elsewhere in the New Testament, but in the context of Matthew 28:20 ("I am with you always, even unto the end of the world") indicates that Jesus will be with the faithful to the end of the age.

Reverence for the name of Jesus is emphasized by Saint Paul in Philippians 2:10 where he states: "That in the name of Jesus every knee should bow, of those that are in heaven, on earth, and under the earth". In Romans 10:13, Paul reiterates the salvific nature of the Holy Name by stating that those who "call on the name of the Lord" will be saved.

The power of the name Jesus used in petitions is stressed in John 16:23 when Jesus states: "If you ask the Father anything in my name he will give it you." Many Christian prayers thus conclude with the words: "Through Our Lord Jesus Christ". Several episodes in the New Testament refer to the power of the invocation of the Holy Name. In Mark 9:38-39 demons are driven out by the power of the name Jesus, in Acts 2:38 baptisms take place and in Acts 3:6, Acts 4:7-11 and Acts 9:34 miracles are performed. Many Christians believe that as in Acts 16:18 the invocation of the name of Jesus provides protection by repelling evil.

== Early history of veneration ==
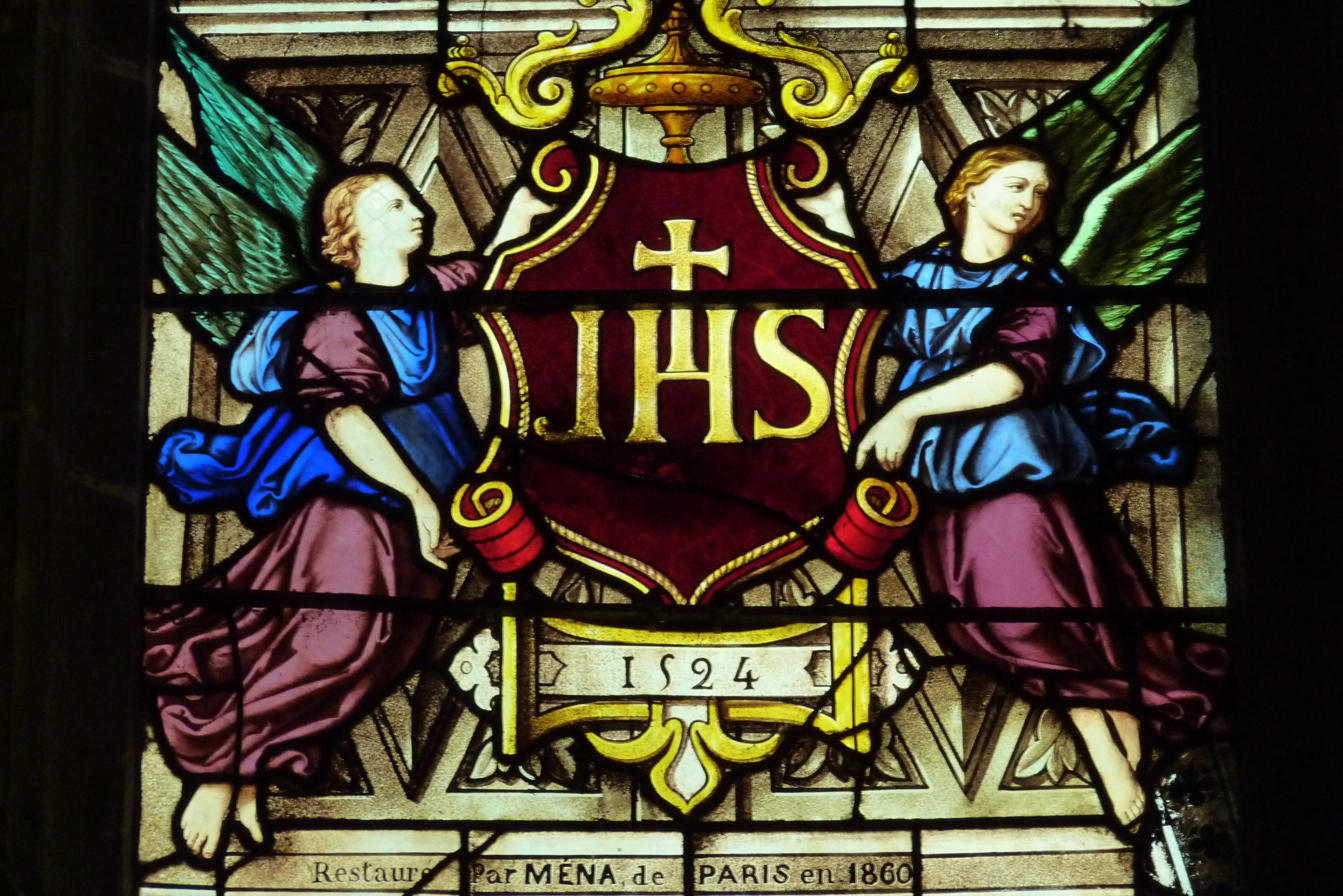
IHS monogram, Montmorency, France

The reverence with which Christians have regarded the Holy Name of Jesus goes back to the earliest days of Christianity, as shown in Acts 4:10 and Philippians 2:10.

Devotion to and veneration of the IHS monogram, derived from the Greek word for Jesus, ΙΗΣΟΥΣ (and sometimes erroneously interpreted as Iesus Hominum Salvator, 'Jesus saviour of mankind'), also dates back to the early days of Christianity, where it was placed on altars and religious vestments, ornaments and other objects. The IHS monogram is also found on a gold coin from the 8th century.

Medieval devotions to the Holy Name in England were promoted by Anselm of Canterbury early in the 12th century. In continental Europe, shortly after Anselm, the veneration of the Holy Name was strongly encouraged by Bernard of Clairvaux. Bernard's writings such as the Sermon on the Canticles later influenced others such as Richard Rolle who expressed similar views, e.g. that of the Holy Name acting as a "healing ointment" for the soul. Rolle believed that the name Jesus has intrinsic power, in a manner reminiscent of the Old Testament reverence of the name Jehovah. In his view the act of calling on the Holy Name purifies the soul and amounts to a reconstruction of the self as a contemplative.

If you think on the name Jesus continually and hold it stably, it purges your sin and kindles your heart.

— Richard Rolle, 14th century

He also composed a number of lyrics about the Holy Name.

Official recognition for the Holy Name was provided by Pope Gregory X at the Council of Lyons in 1274. In the 14th century, Henry Suso promoted devotions to the Name of Jesus in Germany.

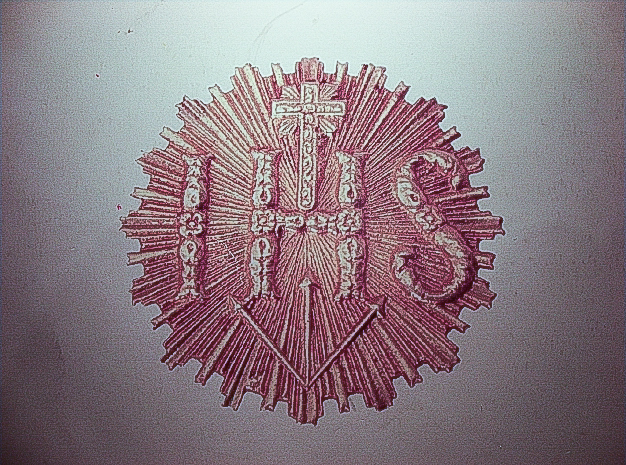
The Jesuit logo has three nails (symbolizing the Crucifixion) below the IHS monogram with a cross.

Margaret Ebner, a German Dominican nun of the 14th century was especially devoted to the Holy Name. She repeated it endlessly for hours and wrote about its power.

The tradition of devotion to and reverence for the Holy Name continued through the 15th century as belief in its miraculous powers became widespread. Walter Hilton's classic work Scale of Perfection included a long passage on the Holy Name. In this period popular beliefs on the power of the Name of Jesus at times coincided with the belief in the power of the Holy Name of Mary. The belief in the power of the Holy name had a strong visual component and the IHS monogram as well as Crucifixion scenes were widely used along with it.

In the 16th century, the Jesuits made the IHS monogram the emblem of their society, by adding a cross over the H and by showing three nails underneath it. Constructed in Rome in 1568 the Church of the Gesù, formally called Chiesa del Santissimo Nome di Gesù all'Argentina (i.e., the "Church of the Most Holy Name of Jesus at the 'Argentina'") is the Mother Church of the order.

A number of religious communities dedicated to the Holy Name Jesus have been formed since the Middle Ages.

== Catholic devotion ==
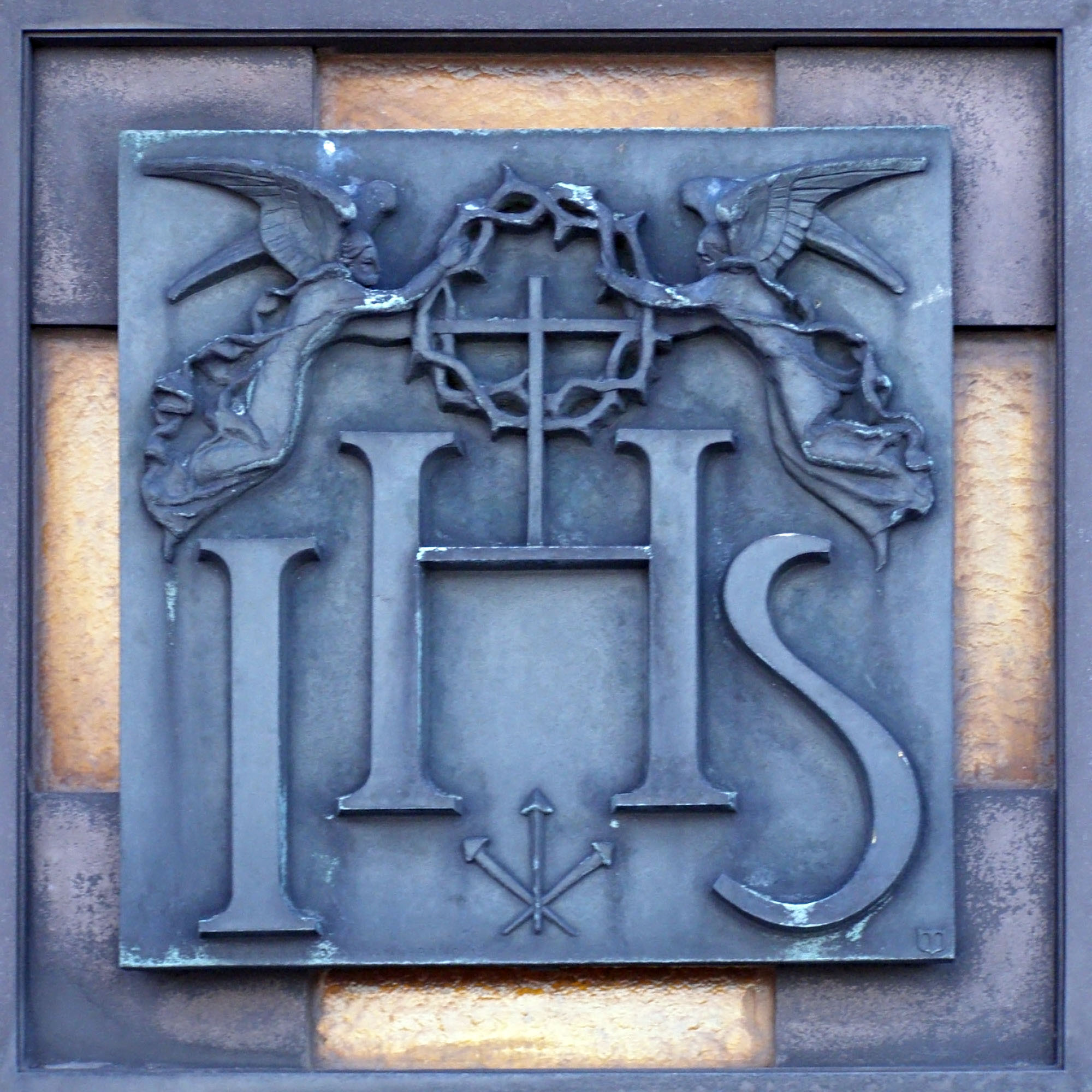
IHS with angels and a Crown of Thorns, in Hostýn, Czech Republic

In the 15th century, the Franciscan Bernardine of Siena actively promoted the devotion to the Holy Name. At the end of his sermons he usually displayed the trigram IHS on a tablet in gold letters. Bernardine would then ask the audience to "adore the Redeemer of mankind". Given that this practice had an unorthodox air, he was brought before Pope Martin V, who instead of rebuking Bernardine, encouraged the practice and joined a procession for it in Rome. The devotion to the Holy Name became so popular in Italy that the IHS trigram was often inscribed over the doorways of houses. The tablet used by Bernardine is now venerated at the basilica of Santa Maria in Aracoeli in Rome.

The Litany of the Holy Name is an old and popular form of prayer in honor of the Name of Jesus. The author is not known. While it probably dates back to the beginning of the 15th century as a private devotion, it was not formally approved for public recitation until 1862 when it was approved by Pope Pius IX. Also common is the Novena in Honor of the Name of Jesus and the chaplet of Our Lord which are part of the many devotions to the Holy Name of Jesus promulgated by the Society of the Holy Name.

Religious articles such as the Little Sachet (associated with the Holy Name) are used by Catholics. The Little Sachet bears the statement: "When Jesus was named – Satan was disarmed."

== Protestantism ==
John Calvin believed in reverence for the Holy Name and encouraged Christians to "glorify His holy name with our whole life". Martin Luther encouraged "pure faith and confidence, and a cheerful meditation of and calling upon His holy Name".

O nomen Jesu by Peter Philips (1612) and Johann Rosenmüller (1648) are motets intended for the service commemorating the naming of Jesus. O Jesu, nomen dulce is a motet by Heinrich Schütz.

== Eastern Christianity ==
The Jesus prayer, which perhaps dates to the 4th century, is widely used in the Eastern Church. In recent years, it has also become a popular devotion among Catholics and members of other Christian churches. Devotions to the Holy Name continued also in the Eastern Church into the 19th and 20th centuries. St. Theophan the Recluse regarded the Jesus Prayer to be stronger than all other prayers by virtue of the power of the Holy Name, and St. John of Kronstadt stated: "The Name of the Lord is the Lord Himself".

The doctrine of imiaslavie (имяславие, or onomatodoxy), the worship of the Name of God as identical with God himself, was condemned by the Russian Orthodox Church in 1913.

== See also ==
- Co-Cathedral of the Most Holy Name of Jesus (1872)
- Holy Face of Jesus
- Jesus prayer
- Name of God in Christianity
