= Pelagia (disambiguation) =

Pelagia (died 457), also known as Pelagia of Antioch, Pelagia the Penitent, and Pelagia the Harlot, was a Christian saint and hermit in the 4th or 5th century.

Pelagia may also refer to:

== Saints ==
- Pelagia the Virgin or Pelagia of Antioch (died 303), a Christian saint, virgin, and martyr
- Januarius and Pelagia (died 320), Christian martyrs and saints in Armenia
- Pelagia of Tarsus or Pelagia the Martyr (died 4th century), a legendary Christian saint and martyr in Cilicia
- Marina the Monk, Pelagia or Mary of Alexandria (5th century), a Christian saint of Byzantine Syria
- Pelagia of Tinos (died 1834), a Christian saint who found the lost icon Our Lady of Tinos in 1822

== Other ==
- Pelagia Gesiou-Faltsi (born 1935), scholar in the field of civil procedure in Greece
- Pelagia Goulimari (born 1964), Greek-British academic
- Pelagia Papamichail (born 1986), Greek basketball player
- Pelagia Majewska (1933–1988), record-setting Polish glider pilot
- Pelagia Mendoza y Gotianquin (1867–1939), the first female sculptor in the Philippines
- Pelageya, а Russian singer

=== In fiction ===
- Sister Pelagia, the fictional heroine of novels by Boris Akunin
- Pelagia, a fictional character in the novel and film Captain Corelli's Mandolin

== Places ==
- Agia Pelagia ("St Pelagia"), a seaside fishing village in Crete, Greece
- Pelagia, Łódź Voivodeship, a village in Łask County, Poland

== Organisms ==
- Fraus pelagia, a species of moth
- Pelagia (cnidarian), a genus of jellyfish
  - Pelagia benovici, former name of Mawia benovici, a Mediterranean species of jellyfish
  - Pelagia colorata, former name of Chrysaora colorata, a Californian species of jellyfish
  - Pelagia noctiluca or mauve stinger, a jellyfish in the family Pelagiidae
- Listonella pelagia, a species of marine bacteria

== Others ==
- 1190 Pelagia, an asteroid named for the Russian astronomer, Pelageya Shajn
- RV Pelagia, a Dutch sea research vessel
- The 12th Colossus in Shadow of the Colossus

== See also ==
- Pelageya, а Russian singer
- Pelageya (disambiguation)
- Marina (disambiguation), the Latinized form of Pelagia
- Pelagie (disambiguation)
