= Pelagia of Antioch (disambiguation) =

- Saint Pelagia the Virgin (d. 303) - martyr
- Saint Pelagia (Pelagia the Penitent or Pelagia the Harlot) (d. 457) - hermit
