= Saint Nonnus =

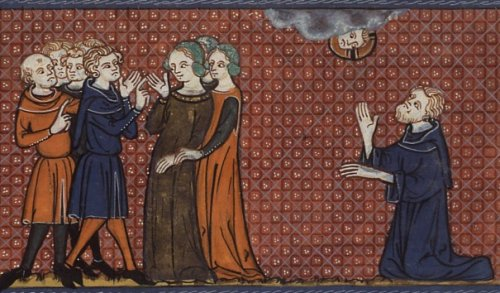
- St Nonnus prays for St Pelagia amongst her courtesans, in a 14th-century manuscript

Bishop
- Born: c. 4th century AD
- Died: c. 471 AD
- Venerated in: Roman Catholic Church, Orthodox Church
- Feast: November 10

Nonnus (Ancient Greek: Νόννος, Nónnos, born c. 4th century AD - died c. 471 AD) was legendary 4th- or 5th-century (Note: It is conventional to date Nonnus and Pelagia to the 5th century—Bunson & al. date his death to c. AD 458—but a form of the story was already appearing in John Chrysostom's sermons in Antioch in 390 so, to the extent that the story reflects historical events, its figures date to the late 4th century.) Christian saint, said to have been an Egyptian monk who became a bishop in Syria and was responsible for the conversion of St Pelagia the harlot during one of the Synods of Antioch. His feast day is observed on November 10.

== Name ==
The name Nonnus was a Levantine one, with eight of the nine Nonni listed in the Acts of the councils of Chalcedon and Ephesus from that area. Some claim it to be a latinization or hellenization of an Egyptian title equivalent to "saint".

== Legend ==
A hagiography of St Pelagia attributed to James or Jacob (Latin: Jacobus), deacon of the church of Heliopolis (modern Baalbek), states that Nonnus was "a perfect monk" from Tabenna or "Tabennesum" in Egypt who, "by reason of his virtuous life", became bishop of Heliopolis, (Note: This is per one of the Georgian versions, with the others leaving it ambiguous where in Syria Nonnus's seat lay.) converting "all its inhabitants" and baptizing 30 000 Arabs. The monks of Ramsgate place his see at Edessa.

As Nonnus addressed a church council in Antioch, the town's most famous courtesan Margarita ("Pearl") passed by. Observing her beauty, Nonnus chastised the members of the assembly for taking less care of their souls than she did of her body. She appeared at his next Sunday sermon and Nonnus's sermon on hell prompted her to repent. She wrote him a letter and was permitted to see him with other witnesses; convinced of her sincerity, he took her confession and baptized her by her birth name Pelagia. After being pursued by the devil for a few days, she donated the property from her former employment to the church and lived with the deaconess Romana before departing for Jerusalem to disguise herself as a male hermit under the name Pelagius. The story significantly omits dates and (on 8 occasions) the name of the archbishop under whom Nonnus served. (Note: One Greek account refers to the archbishop as Flavianus (r. 381–404), although Cameron dismisses its testimony.)

== History ==
The historical St Pelagia — mentioned by St Ambrose and in two sermons by John Chrysostom — was an Antiochene virgin who committed suicide to avoid rape during the Diocletianic Persecution. St Marina — the Latin equivalent of "Pelagius" — was another bride who disguised herself as a monk to escape an unwanted marriage. (Note: A third St Pelagia of Antioch was St Margaret, whose name derives from its earlier form "Margarita".) Aspects of their stories were apparently combined with apocryphal accounts of Mary Magdalene, Biblical accounts of Solomon and the Queen of Sheba and of Jesus and various women in the New Testament, and even with Greek myths regarding Aphrodite to create the story of the harlot Pelagia. Chrysostom's c. 390 sermon also mentions an anonymous (but apparently famous) actress and prostitute "from a wicked city in Phoenice" (possibly Heliopolis) who seduced "the empress's brother" but converted "in our own day". Constantius II's wife Eusebia had two brothers, Eusebius and Hypatius, joint consuls in 359, who both lived for many years in Antioch. In his account, attempts were made to lure her back to her former life by the Roman prefect and some of his soldiers, a role played by Satan in the hagiography.

The mention of a meeting of the Syrian bishops is unhelpful for dating, as more than thirty Synods of Antioch were conducted in late antiquity. John of Ephesus records a persecution of Baalbek's pagans as late as 580 and no record apart from copies of Pelagia's hagiography lists a Nonnus as a bishop of Heliopolis, although his story is sometimes conflated (Note: As in Theophanes.) with the Nonnus known to have been a bishop of Edessa in Mesopotamia and who attended the 451 Council of Chalcedon. (Note: Vossius and Gams argue in favor of Nonnus of Edessa having served as bishop of Heliopolis on the theory that he might have been translated there at the time of the restoration of Bishop Ibas in the early 450s. Tillemont argued against the idea.) This Nonnus has been further conflated with the contemporary poet Nonnus of Panopolis, but this is probably a mistake. Another Nonnus present at Chalcedon was the bishop of Zerabenna in Arabia, which lay under the jurisdiction of Antioch.

== See also ==
- Other people named Nonnus
- SS Pelagia the Harlot, Pelagia the Virgin, Marina the Monk, & Margaret the Virgin
