= Nonnus =

5th-century Greek epic poet

- Νόννος ὁ Πανοπολίτης
- Born: Panopolis, Roman Egypt
- Occupation: Epic poet
- Writing career
- Language: Homeric Greek
- Years active: 5th century AD
- Notable work: Dionysiaca

Nonnus of Panopolis (Ancient Greek: Νόννος ὁ Πανοπολίτης, Nónnos ho Panopolítēs; fl. 5th century AD) was the most notable Greek epic poet of the Imperial Roman era. He was a native of Panopolis (Akhmim) in the Egyptian Thebaid and probably lived in the 5th century AD. He is known as the composer of the Dionysiaca, an epic tale of the god Dionysus, and of the Metabole, a paraphrase of the Gospel of John. The epic Dionysiaca describes the life of Dionysus, his expedition to India, and his triumphant return. It was written in Homeric Greek and in dactylic hexameter, and it consists of 48 books at 21,286 lines.

== Life ==
There is almost no evidence for the life of Nonnus. It is known that he was a native of Panopolis (Akhmim) in Upper Egypt from his naming in manuscripts and the reference in epigram 9.198 of the Palatine Anthology. (Note: On the references to Egypt in the poem, see D. Gigli Piccardi (1998), "Nonno e l'Egitto", Prometheus 24, 61–82 and 161–81. Enrico Livrea has proposed the identification of the poet with the Syrian bishop of Edessa of the same name.) Scholars have generally dated him from the end of the 4th to the central years of the 5th century AD. He must have lived after the composition of Claudian's Greek Gigantomachy (i.e., after 394–397) as he appears to be familiar with that work. Agathias Scholasticus seems to have followed him, with a mid-6th-century reference to him as a "recent author".

He is sometimes conflated with St Nonnus from the hagiographies of St Pelagia and with Nonnus, the bishop of Edessa who attended the Council of Chalcedon, both of whom seem to have been roughly contemporary, but these associations are probably mistaken.

== The Dionysiaca ==
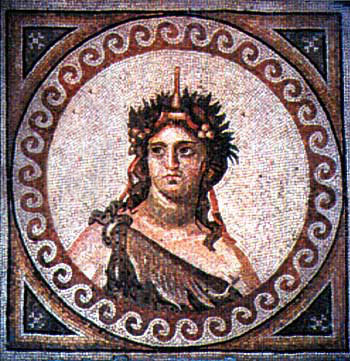
Mosaic of Dionysus from Antioch

Nonnus's principal work is the 48-book epic Dionysiaca, the longest surviving poem from classical antiquity. It has 21,286 lines composed in Homeric Greek and dactylic hexameters, the main subject of which is the life of Dionysus, his expedition to India, and his triumphant return. The poem is to be dated to the 5th century. It used to be considered of poor literary quality, but a mass of recent writing (most notably in the Budé edition and commentary on the poem in 18 volumes) has demonstrated that it shows consummate literary skill, even if its distinctly baroque extravagance is an acquired taste for a modern reader. His versification invites attention: writing in hexameters he uses a higher proportion of dactyls and less elision than earlier poets; this plus his subtle use of alliteration and assonance gives his verse a unique musicality.

== The Paraphrase of John ==
His Paraphrase of John (Metabolḕ toû katà Iōánnēn Euaggelíou) also survives. Its timing is a debated point: textual analysis seems to suggest that it preceded the Dionysiaca while some scholars feel it unlikely that a converted Christian would have gone on to devote so much work to the Dionysiaca's pagan themes. The terminus post quem for its composition is the commentary on the Gospel of John written by Cyril of Alexandria (i.e. 425–428), since the theological layer of Nonnus's Paraphrase is clearly dependent on it. A more difficult issue is to determine the terminus ante quem. Perhaps it is the time of the composition of Pseudo-Apollinaris' Metaphrase of the Psalms (c. 460), which seems to refer to Nonnus's poem.

== Works ==
A complete and updated bibliography of Nonnus scholarship may be found at Hellenistic Bibliography's page at Google Sites.

Editions and translations of the Dionysiaca include:

- Bilingual Greek-English edition (initial introduction, some explanatory notes): W. H. D. Rouse (1940), Nonnos, Dionysiaca, With an English Translation by W. H. D. Rouse, Mythological Introduction and Notes by H. J. Rose, Notes on Text Criticism by L. R. Lind, 3 vols., Loeb Classical Library, Cambridge (Ma.)
- Bilingual Greek-French edition (with introduction to the individual books and notes): F. Vian (general ed.) (1976–2006), Nonnos de Panopolis, Les Dionysiaques, 19 volumes, Paris
- Bilingual Greek-Italian edition (with introductions and notes): D. Gigli Piccardi (general ed.) (2003–4), Nonno di Panopoli, Le Dionisiache, BUR, Milano
- Nonno di Panopoli, Le Dionisiache, a cura di D. del Corno, traduzione di M. Maletta, note de F. Tissoni, 2 vols, Milano 1997.
- F. Tissoni, Nonno di Panopoli, I Canti di Penteo (Dionisiache 44–46). Commento, Firenze 1998

Editions and translations of the Paraphrase include:

- Translation into French: Lodoïs de Martin du Tyrac de Marcellus, Paraphrase de l'Évangile selon saint Jean par Nonnos de Panopolis (Paris, 1861).
- Translation into English: Sherry, L.F., The Hexameter Paraphrase of St. John Attributed to Nonnus of Panopolis: Prolegomenon and Translation (Ph.D. dissertation; Columbia University, 1991).
- Translation in English: Prost, Mark Anthony. Nonnos of Panopolis, The Paraphrase of the Gospel of John. Translated from the Greek by M. A. P. Ventura, CA: The Writing Shop Press, 2006
- The last complete edition of the Greek text: Nonni Panopolitani Paraphrasis S. Evangelii Joannei edidit Augustinus Scheindler, accedit S. Evangelii textus et index verborum, Lipsiae in aedibus Teubneri 1881

A team of (mainly Italian) scholars are now re-editing the text, book by book, with ample introductions and notes. Published so far:

- C. De Stefani (2002), Nonno di Panopoli: Parafrasi del Vangelo di S. Giovanni, Canto I, Bologna
- E. Livrea (2000), Nonno di Panopoli, Parafrasi del Vangelo di S. Giovanni, Canto B, Bologna
- M. Caprara (2006), Nonno di Panopoli, Parafrasi del Vangelo di S. Giovanni, Canto IV, Pisa
- G. Agosti (2003), Nonno di Panopoli, Parafrasi del Vangelo di S. Giovanni, Canto V, Firenze
- R. Franchi (2013), Nonno di Panopoli. Parafrasi del Vangelo di S. Giovanni: canto sesto, Bologna
- K. Spanoudakis (2014), Nonnus of Panopolis. Paraphrase of the Gospel of John XI, Oxford
- C. Greco (2004), Nonno di Panopoli, Parafrasi del Vangelo di S. Giovanni, canto XIII, Alessandria
- E. Livrea (1989), Nonno di Panopoli, Parafrasi del Vangelo di S. Giovanni, Canto XVIII, Napoli
- D. Accorinti (1996), Nonno di Panopoli, Parafrasi del Vangelo di S. Giovanni, Canto XX, Pisa

== See also ==
- Kalamos and Karpos

== Bibliography ==
- Cameron, Alan (2016), "The Poet, the Bishop, and the Harlot", Wandering Poets and Other Essays on Late Greek Literature and Philosophy, Oxford: Oxford University Press, pp. 81–90, ISBN 978-0-19-026894-7.
