= Januarius and Pelagia =

St Januarius of Nicopolis St Pelagia of Nicopolis

Martyrs
- Feast: July 11

Januarius and Pelagia (d. c. AD 320) were joint Christian martyrs and saints recorded in the Jerusalem Martyrology. They were beheaded or racked and torn with iron claws and pieces of earthware at Nicopolis in Armenia during the reign of the Roman emperor Licinius. Their feast day observed on July 11. They are possibly to be considered identical with SS Januarius and Marinus who were martyred in the same place in the same year under identical circumstances with the martyrs Nabor and Felix; their feast day, however, was observed on July 10. Alternatively, the quartet may have been a combination of Januarius and Pelagia (Note: For a discussion of the numerous female saints Pelagia and Marina—names with equivalent meanings in Greek and Latin respectively—who disguised themselves as (or became confused with) men named Pelagius or Marinus, see St Pelagia the Harlot.) with the SS Nabor and Felix were martyred in Italy in the early 4th century.

== See also ==
- Other saints Januarius
- Other saints Pelagia
