= Pelageya (disambiguation) =

Pelageya Sergeyevna Khanova (born 1986) is а Russian singer.

Pelageya may also refer to:

- Pelageya Danilova (1918–2001), Russian artistic gymnast
- Pelageya Polubarinova-Kochina (1899–1999), Soviet applied mathematician
- Pelageya Shajn or Shayn (1894–1956), Soviet–Russian astronomer

== See also ==
- Saint Pelagia, a legendary Christian saint and hermit in the 4th or 5th century
- Pelagia (disambiguation)
