= Michalis Papakonstantinou =

Greek politician (1919–2010)

Minister of Foreign Affairs
- In office 7 August 1992 – 13 October 1993
- Prime Minister: Konstantinos Mitsotakis
- Preceded by: Konstantinos Mitsotakis
- Succeeded by: Karolos Papoulias

Personal details
- Born: 1 November 1919 Kozani, Greece
- Died: 17 January 2010 (aged 90) Athens, Greece
- Party: New Democracy
- Education: University of Thessaloniki

Michalis Papakonstantinou (Greek: Μιχάλης Παπακωνσταντίνου; 1 November 1919 – 17 January 2010) was a Greek politician and author. He studied law at the Aristotle University of Thessaloniki. Papakonstantinou served as the Minister for Foreign Affairs from 7 August 1992 until 13 October 1993, as a member of the New Democracy Party.

He regularly wrote as a columnist in newspapers in both Athens and Thessaloniki. He also contributed to Greek and foreign magazines as a writer.

Papakonstantinou was born in Kozani, Greece, in 1919. He died on January 17, 2010, at the age of 90.

Political offices
Preceded by Konstantinos Mitsotakis	Minister for Foreign Affairs; 1992–1993	Succeeded by Karolos Papoulias
