= Dimitris Tsatsos =

Dimitris Th. Tsatsos (Greek: Δημήτρης Θ. Τσάτσος; Athens, 5 May 1933 – 24 April 2010) was a Greek legal scholar and former Member of the European Parliament. He was the son of the politician and lawyer Themistoklis Tsatsos (1906–1971) and a nephew of former President of Greece Konstantinos Tsatsos (1899–1987). He was the brother of Constantine Tsatsos and Annita Alevras.

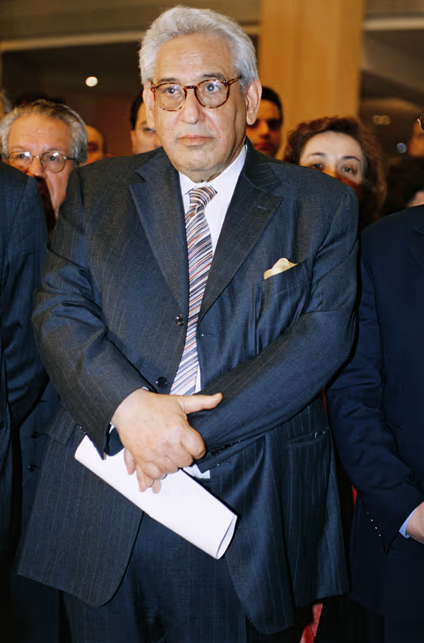
Tsatsos in 2002

== Life and career ==
After studying law at the University of Athens and University of Heidelberg, at the age of 27 he was declared a Doctor of Law at the University of Athens. From 1958 to 1964 was lecturer at the Faculty of Heidelberg and the period 1964–1965 he worked as a researcher at the Max Planck Institut. In 1968 he was elected lecturer in law at the University of Bonn. In 1968, at the Law and Economics Faculty of the University of Bonn. In 1969 he was elected professor of law at the University of Thessaloniki, but was not permitted to teach by the ruling military regime. In 1970 he was elected as permanent professor at the University of Bonn in 1973 while imprisoned by the dictatorship.

Following the fall of the dictatorship in 1974, he was elected to the Athens EDIKA. Just before his murder, Alecos Panagoulis publicly accused Tsatsos of close collaboration with the military regime, including filing damning reports on students involved with the resistance movement. The evidence is discussed by Oriana Fallaci in “One man” pages 471-473. In 1975 he was elected professor of Law at the Aristotle University of Thessaloniki. From 1980 to 1989 he was Professor of Constitutional Law at the Panteion University of Athens. At the same time he was a full professor of German and International Public Law at the University of Hagen. During the period 1993–1994 he served as unpaid adviser to the Prime Minister, and in 1994 he was elected MP of the Panhellenic Socialist Movement. From 1991 to 1997, he was director of the Institute for German and European political parties law. Between 1994 and 2004 Tsatsos was a Member of the European Parliament representing the Social Democratic Party.

== Sources ==
- Βιογραφική Εγκυκλοπαίδεια του Νεωτέρου Ελληνισμού 1830-2010 - Αρχεία Ελληνικής Βιογραφίας, published by Metron, 3rd Vol., p. 502/3. (Greek language)
