= Law School of the Aristotle University of Thessaloniki =

Second oldest Greek law school

Coordinates: 40°37′48″N 22°57′29″E

Thessaloniki School of Law
- Νομική Σχολή του Πανεπιστημίου Θεσσαλονίκης
- Motto: Μούσαις Χάρισι Θῦε (Ancient Greek)
- Motto in English: Sacrifice to the Muses and Charites
- Established: 1929
- Dean: Panagiotis Glavinis
- Location: Thessaloniki, Greece
- Website: https://law.auth.gr/en/

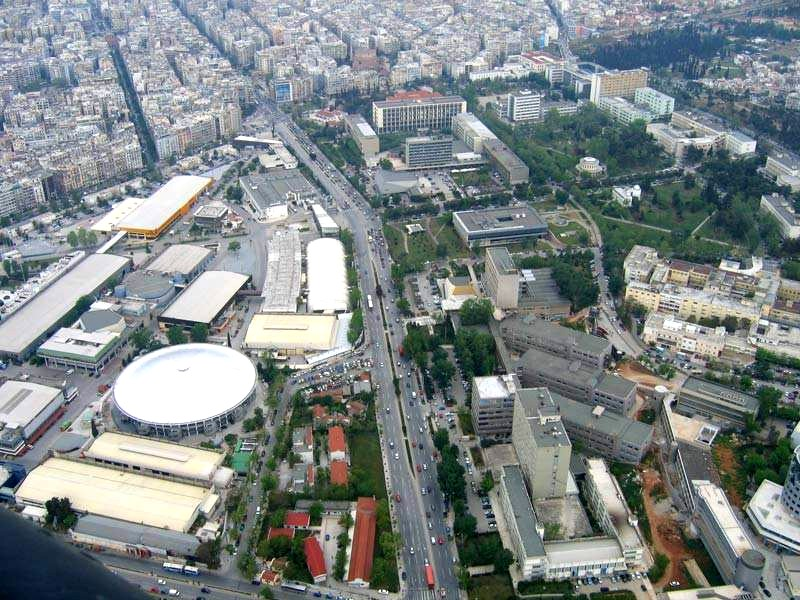
Aerial view of Central Thessaloniki. On the right the Aristotle University's campus

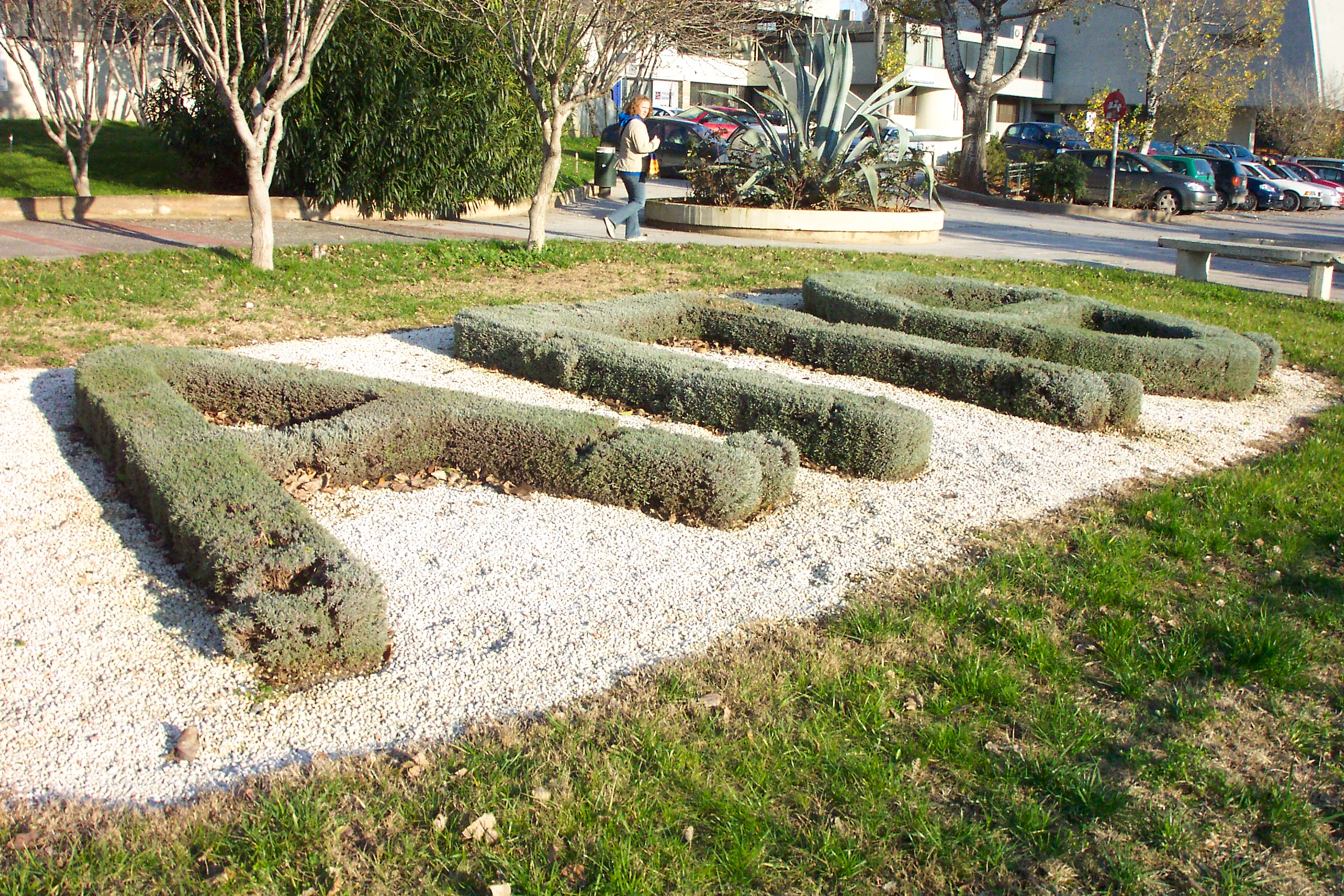
ΑΠΘ letters in Greek

The Law School of the Aristotle University of Thessaloniki (Greek: Νομική Σχολή του Πανεπιστημίου Θεσσαλονίκης, romanized: Nomikí Scholí tou Panepistimíou Thessaloníkis) is considered one of the most prestigious Greek law schools. It is the second oldest law school founded in the country, preserving and sharing legal knowledge since 1929.

== History ==
The law department was founded and began its operation in 1930 during the premiership of Alexandros Papanastassiou. One of the first 5 faculties of the Aristotle University of Thessaloniki was the Faculty of Law and Economics consisting of two departments, Law Department and Economics and Political Science Department. A special committee took place (composed of Professors A. Andreades, K. Varvaressos, S. Seferiades and C. Sfiris) in order to elect the first professors of the Law school; Periklis Vizoukides (who was the first Dean of the faculty and afterwards rector of the Aristotle University of Thessaloniki), Professor of Civil Law, Xenophon Zolotas Politic Economy professor, Jean Spiropoulos Professor of International Law, Dimosthenis Stefanides Politic Economy professor and Thrasivoulos Haralambides Professor of Commercial law. Lately in '00s, Faculty of Law and Economics was expanded with Political Science department and hence was renamed into Faculty of Law, Economics and Political Science. In 1962 the graduate program (the first LLM in Greece) of the law school began its operation. Law school takes part in many international law competitions such as Ph. Jessup Moot Court International competition. In this competition, Law School of Thessaloniki in 2005 came 1st among 600 universities from all over the world (in the writing part of the competition), 5th in 2001, 4th in 2004 (in the writing part of the competition), 6th in 2007 and 5th in 2008, 3rd in 2009. In addition, in 2011 law school came first in Europe as it participated in a competition which was organized by the World Trade Organization, accomplishing to beat popular law schools such as Oxford's, King's College and LSE's law schools.

== Pr. Ioannis Deligiannis Library ==
Dean Pr. Dimitrios Papasteriou took initiative to organize Law school's library and hence the library was established in 1998. It is located on the third floor of the Faculty of Law, Economics and Political Science. It is called Pr. Ioannis Deligiannis library in the honour of the popular civil law professor (and rector of the Aristotle University of Thessaloniki) Ioannis Deligiannis. Until recently, most books were kept in law school's departments. Pr. Deligiannis library has acquired donations by famous professors and politicians such as Alexandros Papanastasiou, Aristovoulos Manesis, Alexandros Svolos, Themistoklis Tsatsos, H. Muller etc. In addition the US government has made a donation to the library. Pr. Deligiannis library is the largest law library in Greece.

== Notable alumni and professors ==
The law school has produced leaders in law, government, and society, including:

- Gianna Angelopoulos-Daskalaki, Greek politician and businesswoman, named as one of the 50 most powerful women by Forbes magazine. She was the president of the Organizing Committee for the 2004 Summer Olympics in Athens, Greece. She studied law at the Aristotle University of Thessaloniki.
- Evangelos Venizelos, President of the Panhellenic Socialist Movement, former Deputy Prime Minister and Minister for Finance. He is Professor of Constitutional Law at the Law School of the Aristotle University of Thessaloniki.
- Vassilis Vassilikos, Writer and diplomat.
- Vassilios Nikopoulos, President of the Supreme Court.
- Christos Sartzetakis, Greek jurist and elder statesman. He entered the Law Faculty of the Aristotle University of Thessaloniki in 1946, and received his degree in 1950, after which he practiced law in Thessaloniki. He was the unyielding prosecutor in the sensational case of the assassination of the left-wing member of parliament Grigoris Lambrakis, committed on 22 May 1963 in Thessaloniki by far-right extremists. On 9 March 1985 he was elected by the Greek Parliament as President of the Hellenic Republic for one 5-year term, succeeding Konstantinos Karamanlis.
- Vassilios Skouris, the 10th President of the European Court of Justice. Professor of Public Law
- Krateros Ioannou received a law degree and a doctorate in international law from the University of Thessaloniki in 1971. Professor of public international law and Community law at the law faculty of the University of Thrace, he acted as legal advisor at national and international level; in particular, he was a Member of the Greek Delegation to the General Assembly of the UN from 1983 and Chairman of the Committee of Experts for the Improvement of the Procedure under the Convention of Human Rights of the Council of Europe from 1989 to 1992. Furthermore, he was judge of the European Court of Justice
- Pelayia Yessiou-Faltsi, Professor of Civil Procedure law and honorary attorney at the Supreme Court
- Andreas Loverdos, former Minister for Health and Social Solidarity and professor of Constitutional Law
- Dimitris Sioufas, ex-Speaker of the Hellenic Parliament
- Philippos Petsalnikos, ex-Speaker of the Hellenic Parliament
- Symeon C. Symeonides, Dean of the Willamette University College of Law and President of the American Society of Comparative Law
- Haris Kastanidis, former Minister for the Minister for the Interior and Public Order
- Jean Spiropoulos, Judge at the International Court of Justice, professor of Public International Law
- Philomila Tsoukala, Associate Professor of law at Georgetown Law school
- Petros C. Mavroidis, Edwin B. Parker Professor of Foreign and Comparative Law at Columbia Law School
- Xenophon Zolotas, former Prime Minister of Greece
- Nikolaos Papantoniou, popular professor of Civil Law and Minister of Justice (1984)
- Paraskevi Naskou-Perraki, ad hoc judge at the European Court of Human Rights and Professor at the University of Macedonia
- Dimitris Evrigenis, judge at the European Court of Human Rights and popular Professor of International Law at Thessaloniki Law School
- Michalis Chrysohoidis, former Minister for Regional Development and Competitiveness and Minister for Citizen Protection
- George Petalotis, former Deputy Minister to the Prime Minister of Greece and Government Spokesman
- Elias Petropoulos, author
- Haris Tagaras, lawyer linguist at the Council of the European Communities (1980 to 1982); Administrator at the Court of Justice of the European Communities and at the Commission of the European Communities (1986 to 1990); external consultant for European matters at the Ministry of Justice and member of the Permanent Committee of the Lugano Convention (1991 to 2004); member of the national Postal and Telecommunications Commission (2000 to 2002; from 2005 judge at the Civil Service Tribunal Of The European Union
- Miltiadis Papaioannou, former Minister of Justice, Transparency and Human Rights
- Dimitris Tsatsos, legal scholar and former Member of the European Parliament. He was professor of Constitutional Law
- Michalis Papakonstantinou, former Minister of Justice
- A. N. Yiannopoulos, is a former professor at Tulane University Law School, expert on civil law and comparative law, founder of the Civil Law Commentaries
- Xavier Bettel, Prime Minister of Luxembourg
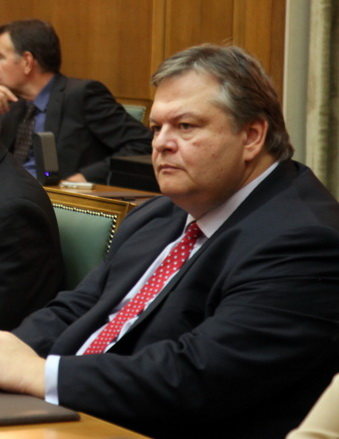
Evangelos Venizelos, former Deputy Prime Minister and Finance Minister, member of the Greek Parliament.

== See also ==
- List of universities in Greece
- List of modern universities in Europe (1801–1945)

== Sources ==
«Σχολή Νομικών, Οικονομικών και Πολιτικών Επιστημών: 75 χρόνια», Αριστοτέλειο Πανεπιστήμιο Θεσσαλονίκης, εκδ. Α.Π.Θ. (Faculty of Law, Economics and Political Science: 75 years, Aristotle University of Thessaloniki, A.U.Th. publications)
