= Nonnus of Edessa =

5th century Christian bishop

Nonnus (Ancient Greek: Νόννος, Nónnos) was a bishop of Edessa in the mid-5th century.

== Life ==
Nonnus was preceded as bishop of Edessa by Ibas (Donatus), who was irregularly deposed. Ibas was deposed on 1 January 448 and Nonnus enthroned as his replacement on 21 July 448. Some sources give him as the bishop at Edessa until his death in 471, while the Chronicle of Edessa states that Nonnus left the see in 450 and did not return until Bishop Ibas's death on 28 October 457. Ibas was held in prison but freed on 27 October 451, the earlier proceedings against him having been found irregular and unjustified.

Nonnus is often conflated with the St Nonnus, the legendary bishop of Heliopolis (Baalbek) who appears in the hagiographies of St Pelagia. Similarly, he is sometimes conflated with the Egyptian Christian epic poet Nonnus of Panopolis, who was a rough contemporary. Both associations are probably mistaken.

== See also ==
- Other people named Nonnus
