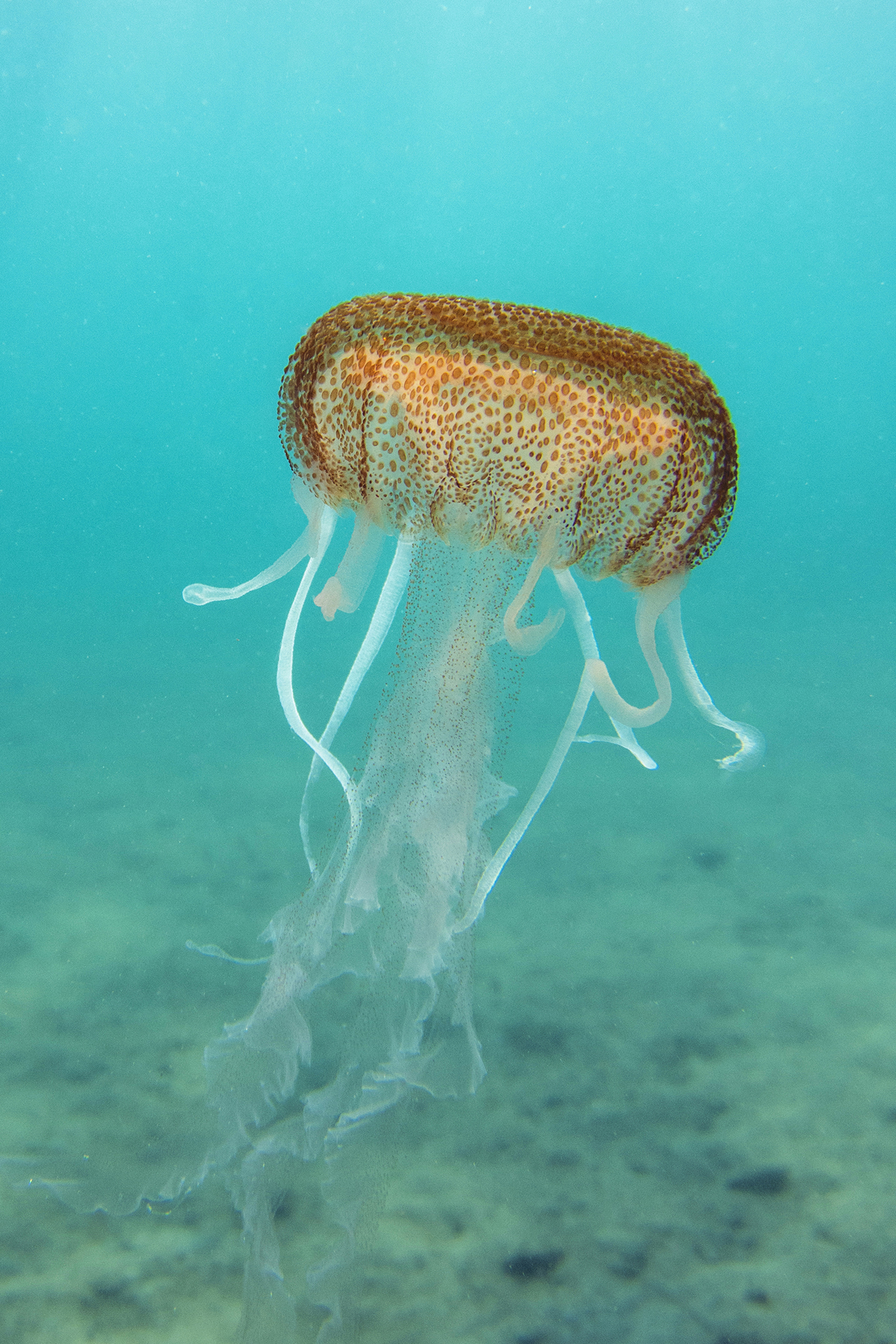
- Mawia benovici

Scientific classification
- Kingdom: Animalia
- Phylum: Cnidaria
- Class: Scyphozoa
- Order: Semaeostomeae
- Family: Pelagiidae
- Genus: Mawia; Avian, Ramšak, Tirelli, D'Ambra & Malej, 2016
- Species: M. benovici

Binomial name
- Mawia benovici (Piraino, Aglieri, Scorrano & Boero, 2014)

Synonyms
- Pelagia benovici Piraino, Aglieri, Scorrano & Boero, 2014

= Mawia =

Genus of jellyfishes

Mawia is a genus of jellyfish in the family Pelagiidae. It is a monotypic genus, only containing the species Mawia benovici. The team who discovered this jellyfish named it benovici after a late colleague, Adam Benovic. Originally belonging to the genus Pelagia, it was later moved into its own genus, which was named after the Arab warrior-queen Mavia. Although described based on specimens from the Adriatic Sea, a part of the Mediterranean, it was speculated that these might be transplants (via ballast water) rather than a part of its natural range. A later study found specimens in Senegal, indicating that its natural range possibly is the Atlantic Ocean off West Africa.

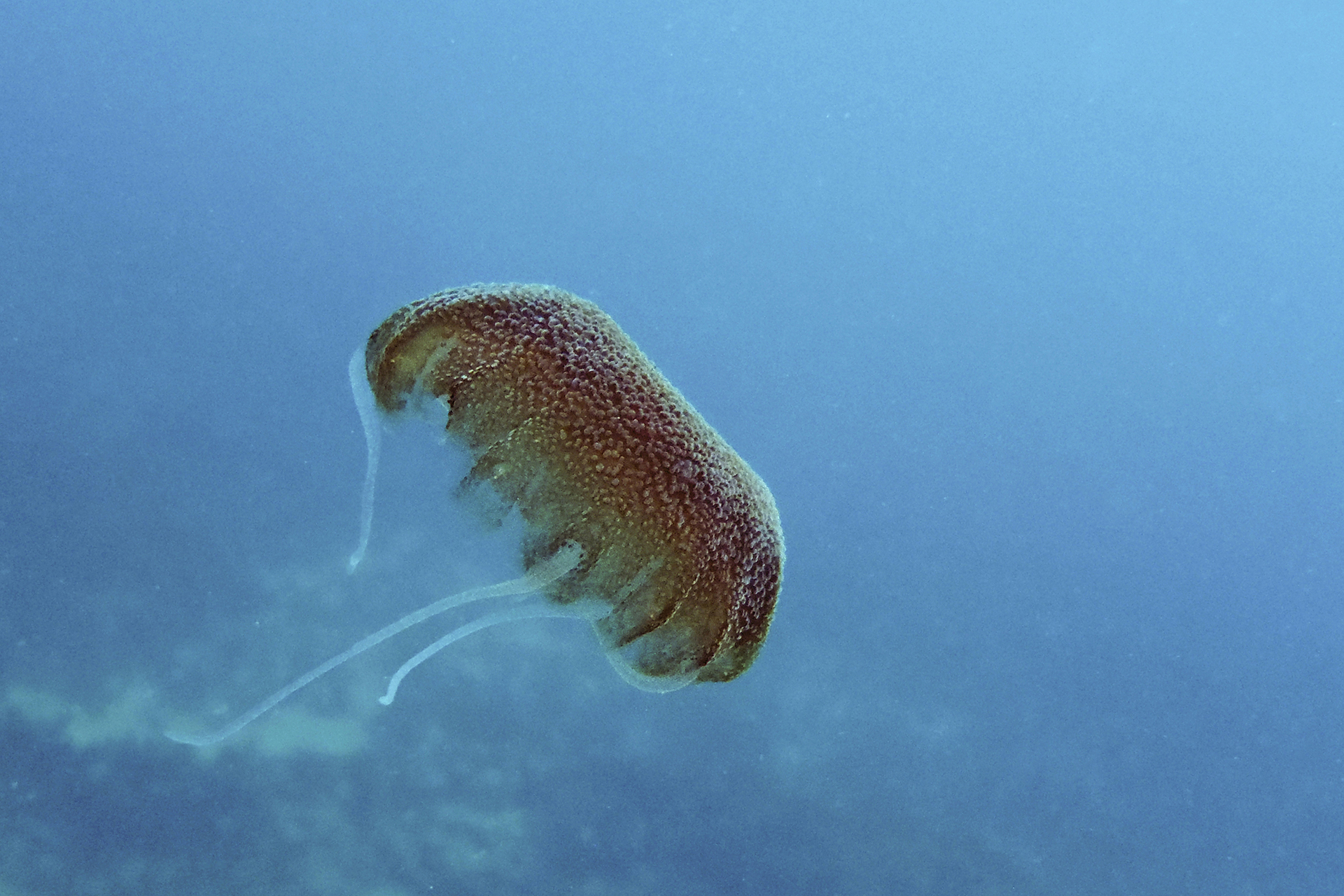
This is the first recorded find of M. Benovici in the Croatian part of the Adriatic Sea.

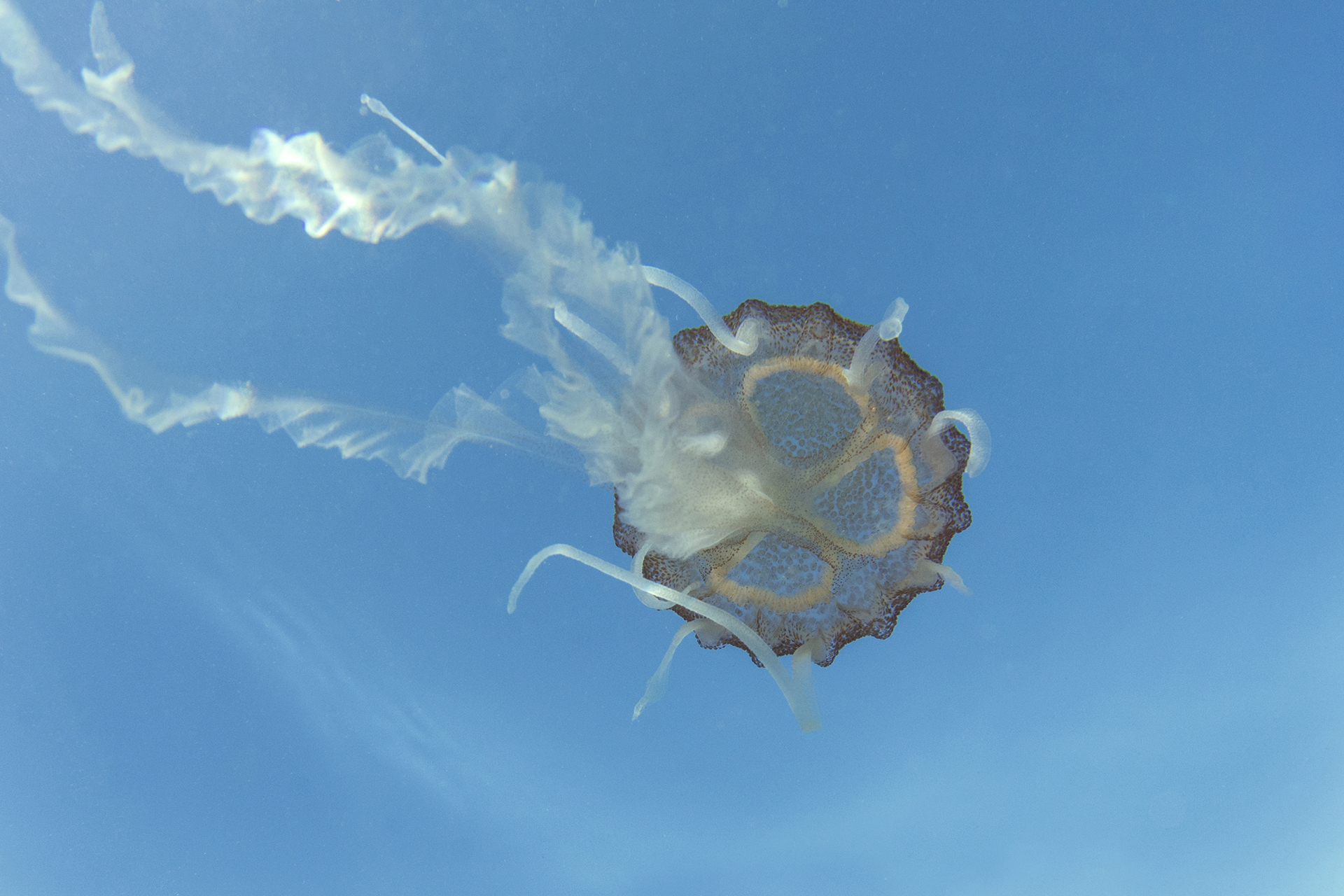
A view from below reveals gonads of yellow color, which means that the jellyfish is male.

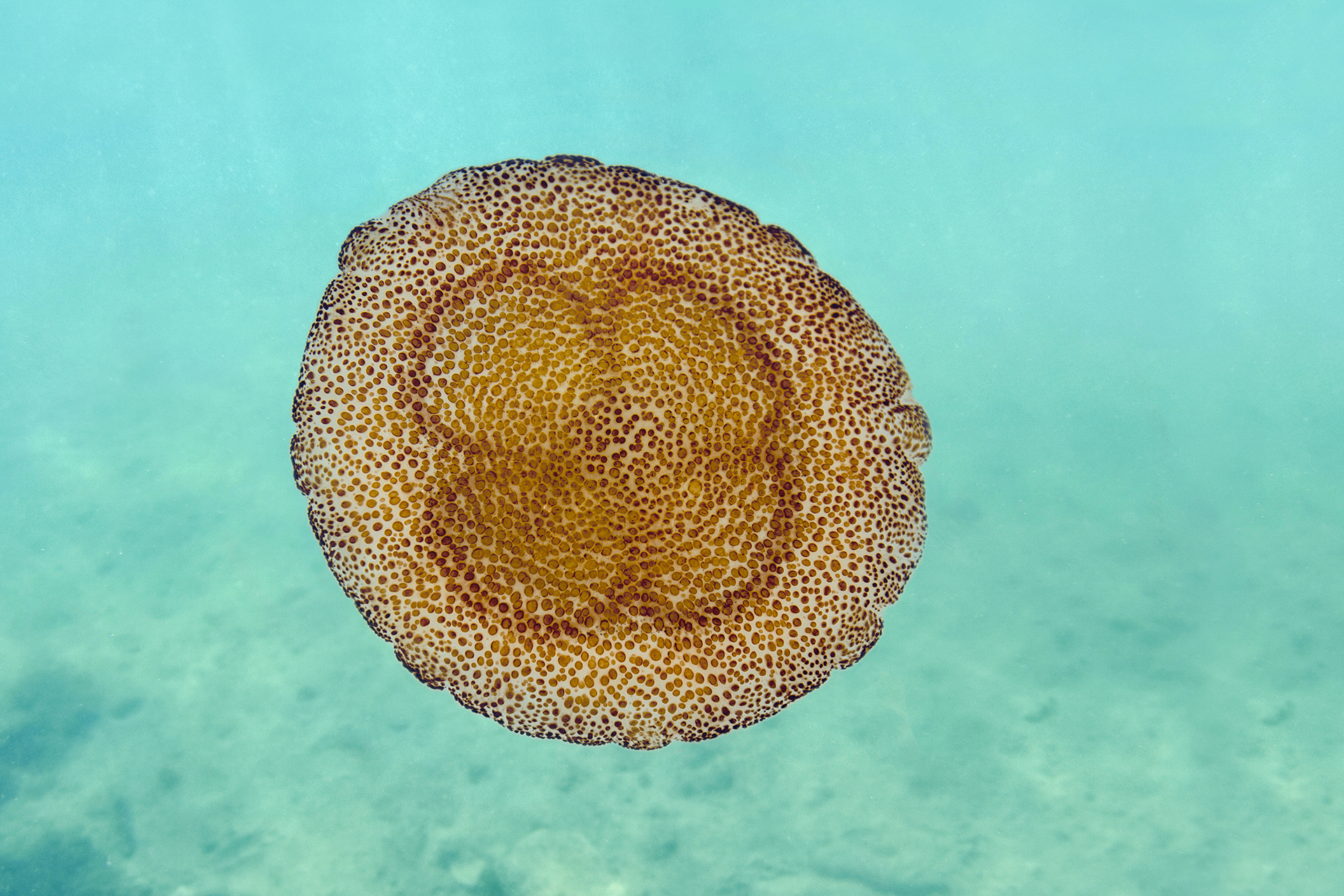
A view of the top of the bell.

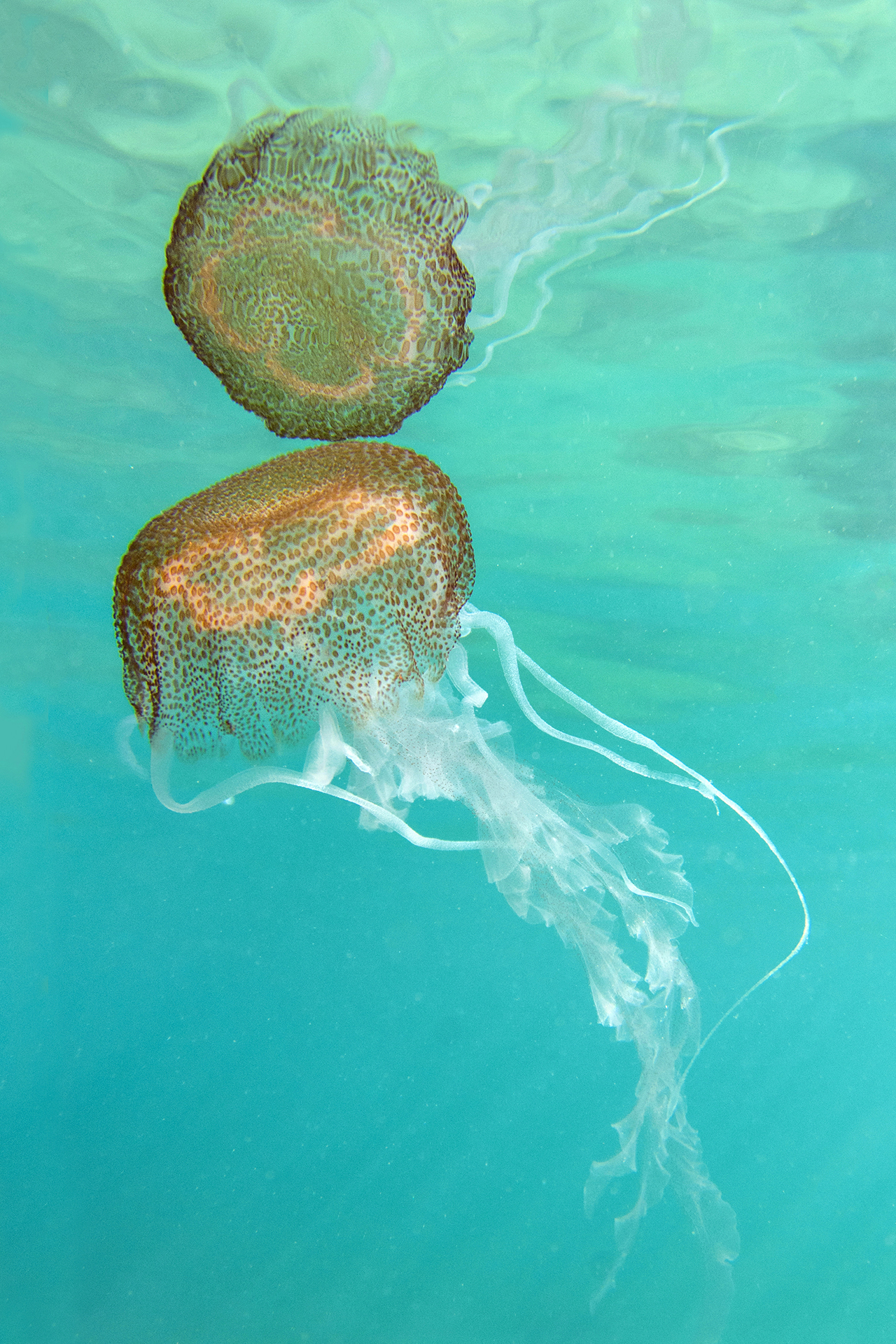
Jellyfish and its reflection on the sea surface.
