= Menologion of Basil II =

Byzantine illuminated manuscript compiled c. 1000 AD

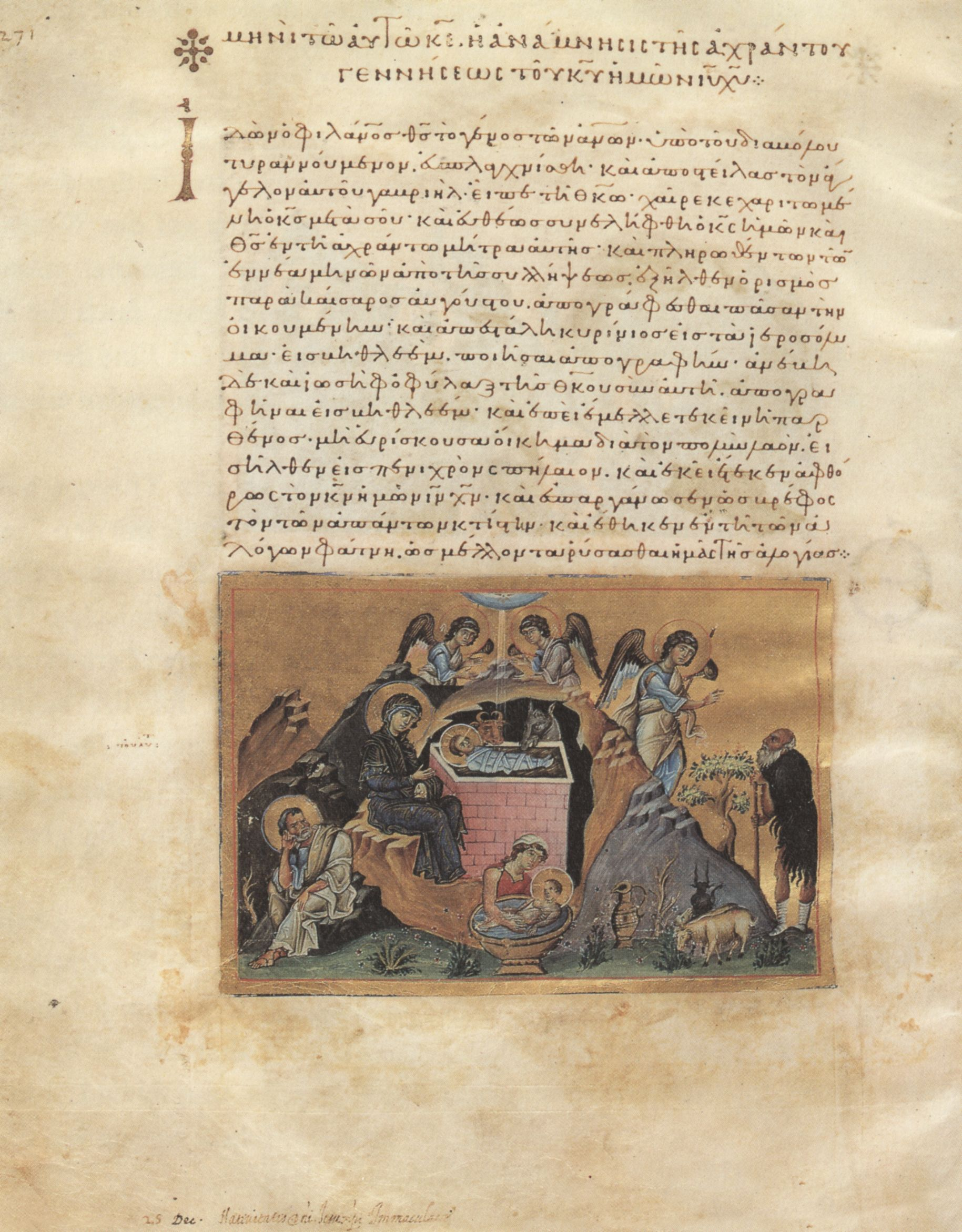
Menologion of Basil II: Nativity of Christ, Constantinople, c. 1000

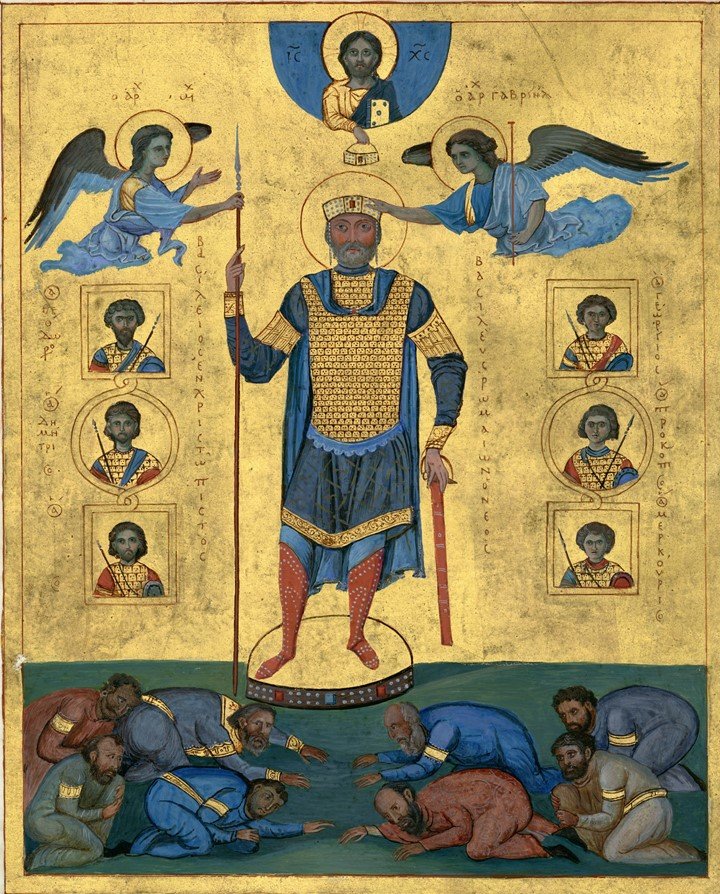
The Psalter of Basil II: Famous image of Basil II, Constantinople, 11th century

The Menologion, Menologium, or Menology of Basil II is a Greek illuminated manuscript designed as a church calendar or Eastern Orthodox Church service book (menologion) that was compiled c. 1000 AD for the Byzantine Emperor Basil II (r. 976–1025). It contains a synaxarion, a short collection of saints' lives, compiled at Constantinople for liturgical use and around 430 miniature paintings by eight different artists. It was unusual for a menologion from that era to be so richly painted. It currently resides in the Vatican Library (Ms. Vat. gr. 1613). A full facsimile was produced in 1907.

== Description ==
The manuscript is not technically a menologion, but a synaxarion: a liturgical book containing a list of the saints and their feast days with a short description of sixteen lines of text and a painting of a saint or grouping of saints. The more than 430 images are important examples of hagiography, the veneration of saints, in Byzantine illumination. Text and images cover only half of the religious calendar of the Byzantine liturgical year (September to February), so it is assumed that there was a second volume to the work, but this was probably never produced, since some pages within the manuscript were left unfinished. The miniatures themselves have no liturgical role—it is possible that their purpose was to act as protectors of the Emperor. The manuscript inspired the illustration of a number of subsequent menologia.

The work glorifies Emperor Basil II showing him as a warrior defending Orthodox Christendom against the attacks of the Bulgarian Empire, whose attacks on Byzantium are graphically illustrated. Even figures like the archangels were depicted in military guise by the painters.

== History ==
The manuscript was copied and painted at Constantinople at the command of, or as a gift for, the Emperor Basil II. It was completed between 979 and the early years of the 11th century. In the course of the 14th century it came into the possession of a Genoese doctor who resided in Constantinople. In the 15th century it was acquired by Ludovico Sforza, Duke of Milan. At the beginning of the 17th century the cardinal Paolo Emilio Sfondrati gave it to Pope Paul V and the manuscript now resides in the Vatican Library.

== Artists ==
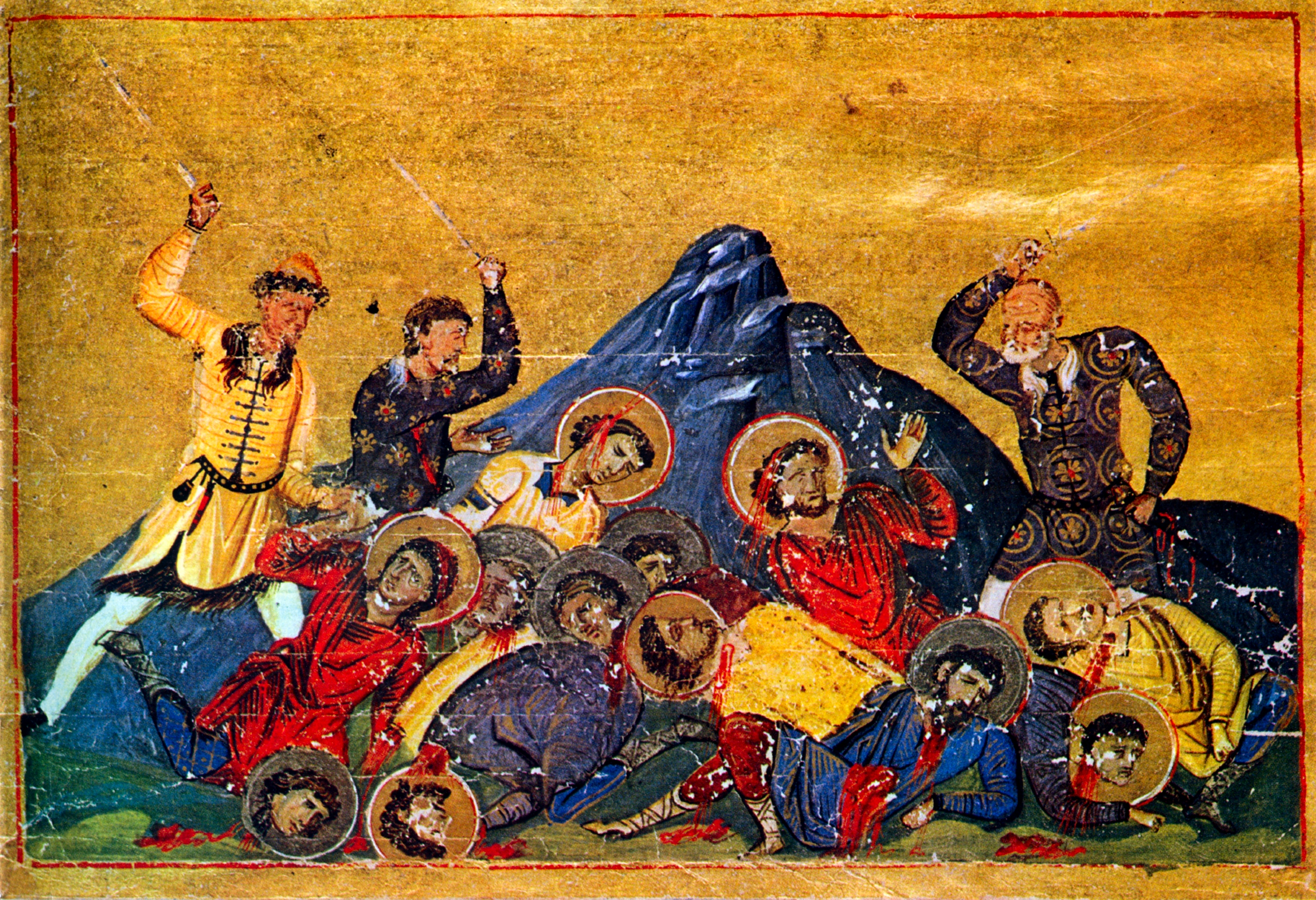
Bulgar soldiers slaughter Christians, from the Menologion of Basil II, 10th century.

The artists who produced the images for the Menologion employed perspective and moved away from the flat depictions common up to that time. The figures' gestures and drapery are depicted in a lifelike manner, with architecture and backgrounds well-rendered. Facial expressions are painted in a naturalistic style. The work thus demonstrates the painting style of the period which is often referred to as the Macedonian Renaissance in which painters returned to ancient models with gusto.

Unusual for a Byzantine manuscript, the name of the painter of each illustration is recorded by a scribe at the edge of each image. A total of eight names can be recognised. One painter, by the name of Pantoleon, who may be referred to in other documents of the time, seems to have been in charge of the group. They likely worked together in a workshop connected to the Imperial court. The other painters are Georgios, Michael the Younger, Michael of Blachernai, Simeon, Simeon of Blachernai, Manas, and Nestor.

The names are not the signatures of the artists themselves, since they are all recorded in the same handwriting. It is very rare for artistic works from the Middle Ages to record the name of the artist, since it was not the individual artist so much as the meaning of the image which was most important. The reason for the recording of the names of the painters below their works in the Menologion of Basil II is not clear.

== Gallery ==
Miniatures from the Menologion of Basil II
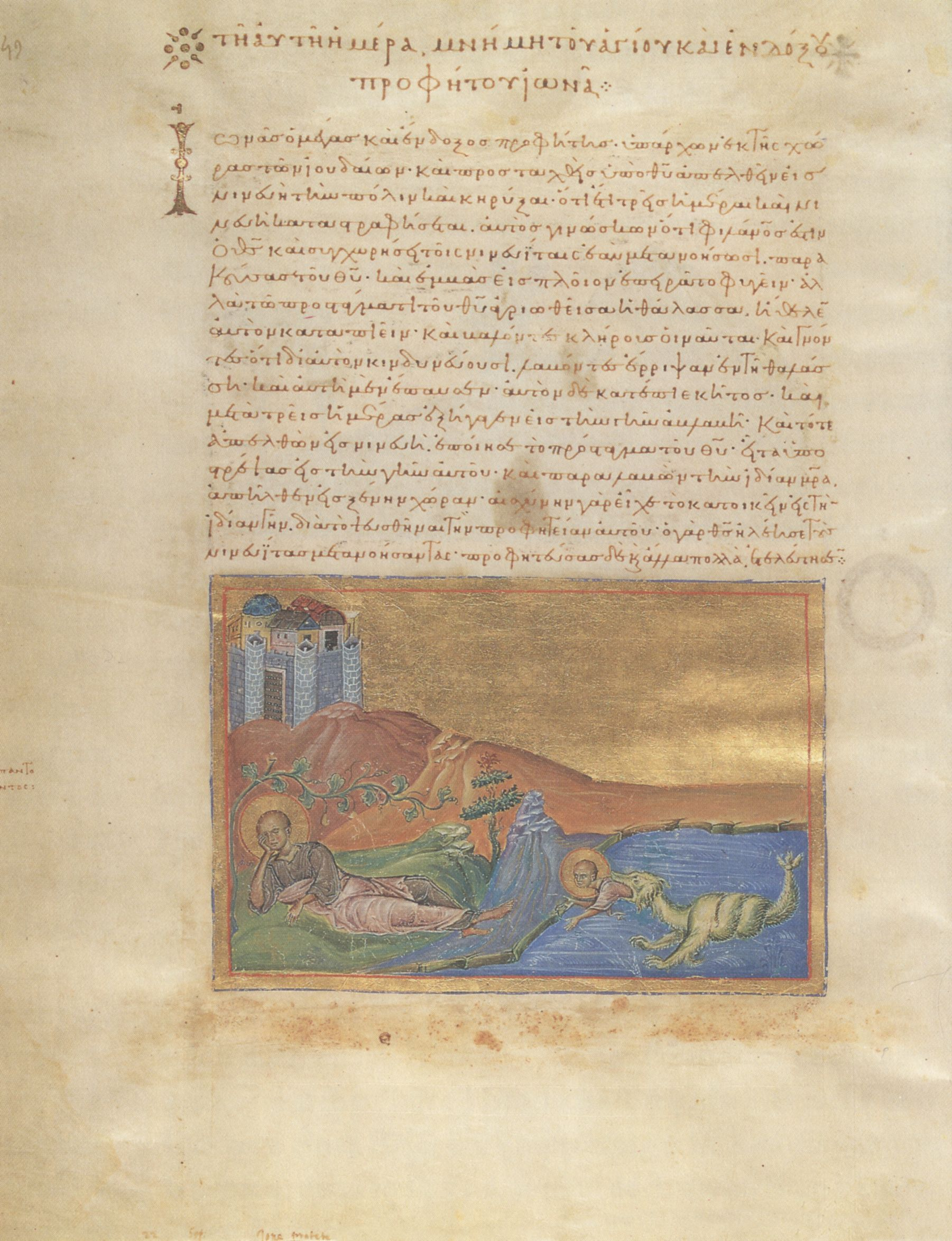
Jonah and the whale

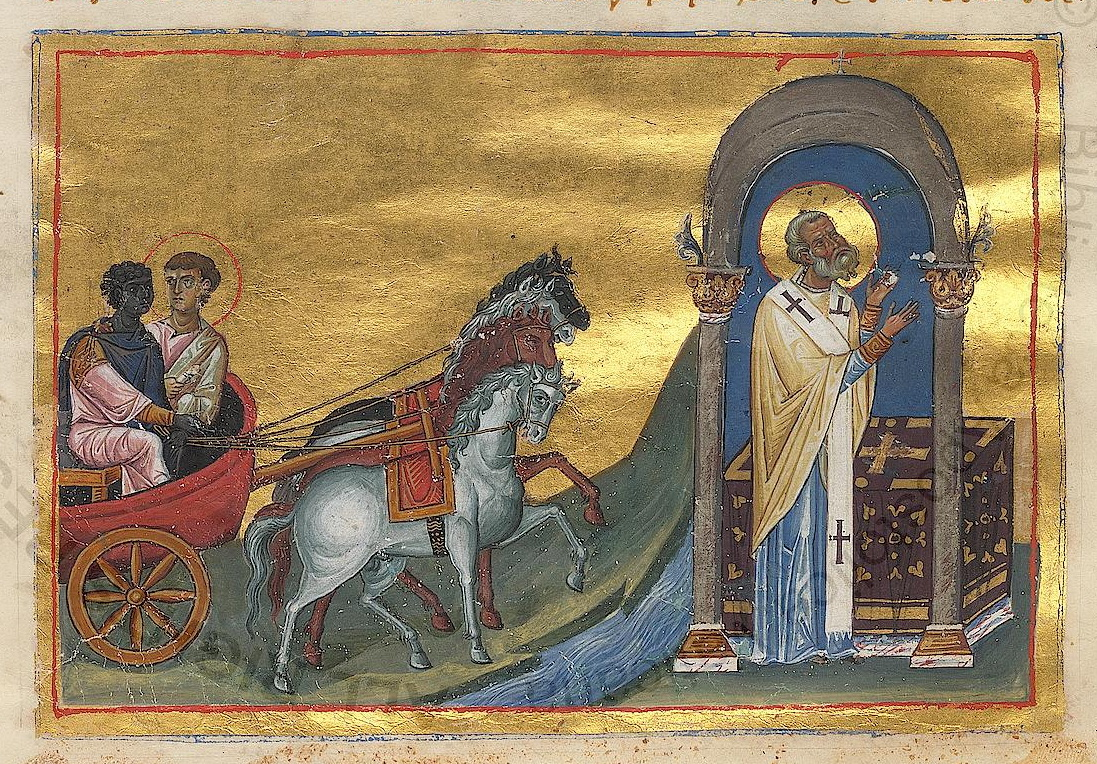
Philip the Evangelist and the Ethiopian eunuch

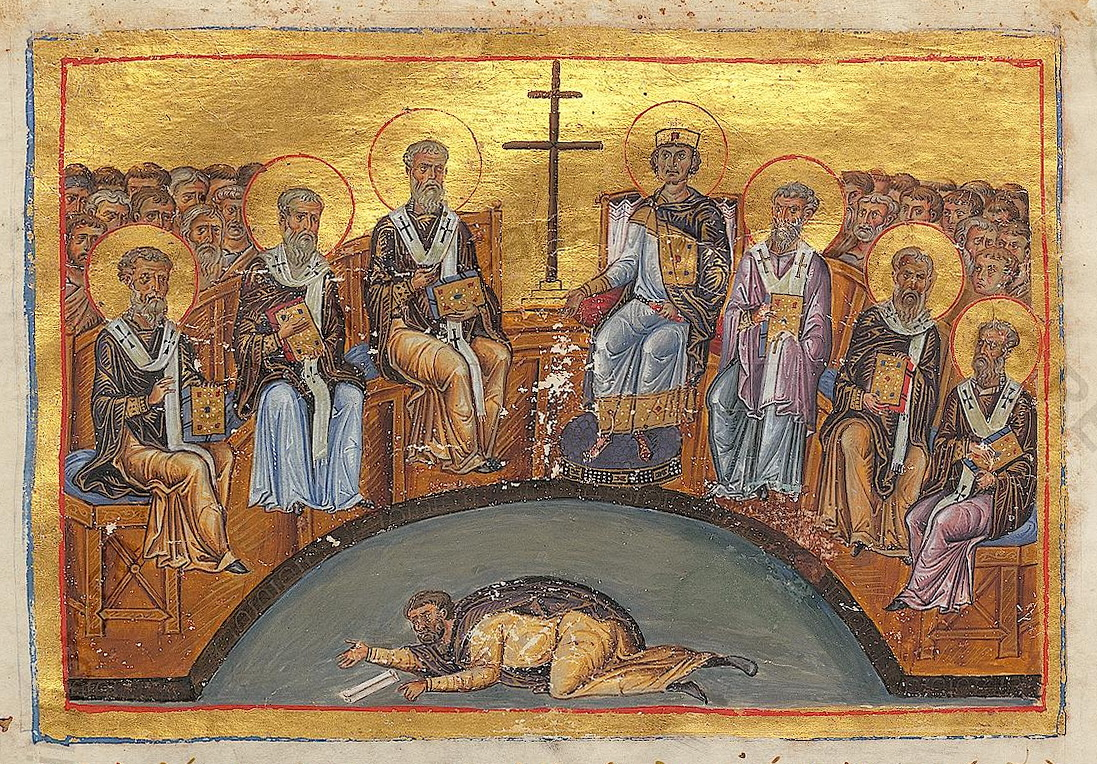
Second Council of Nicaea

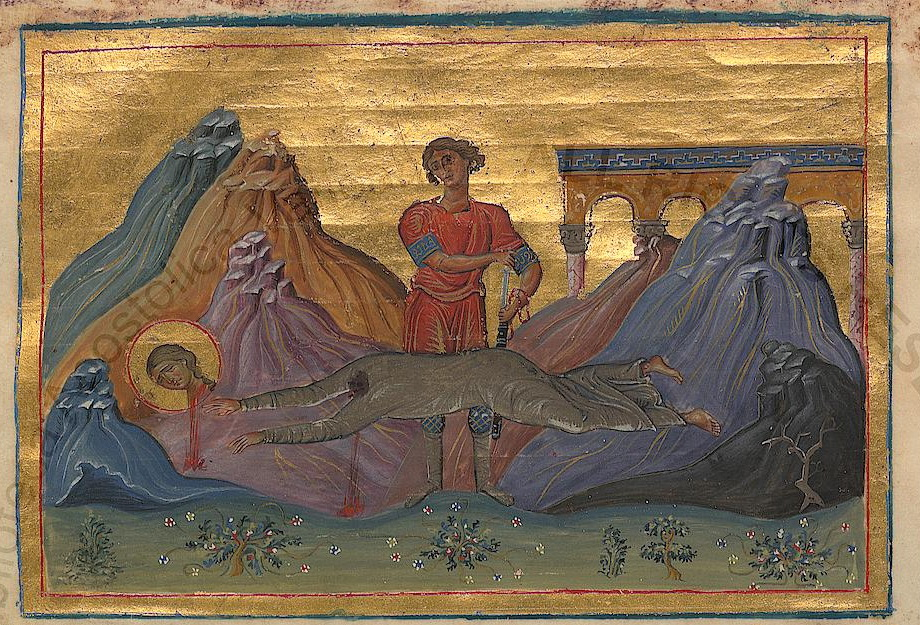
Hermione of Ephesus

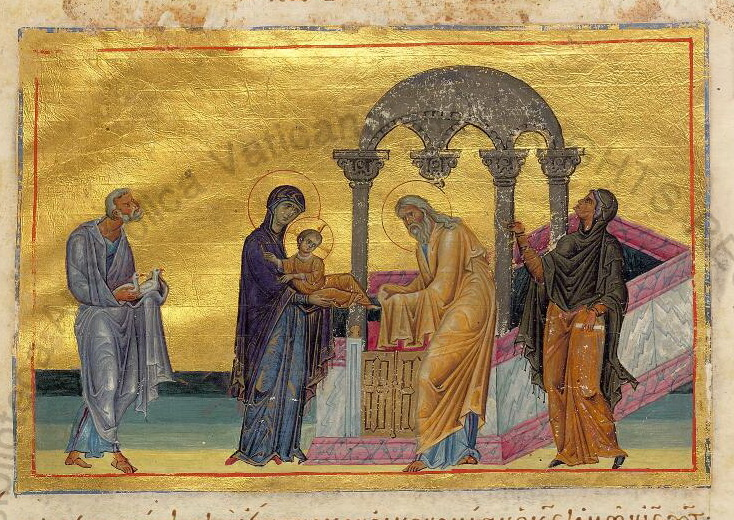
Presentation of Jesus at the Temple

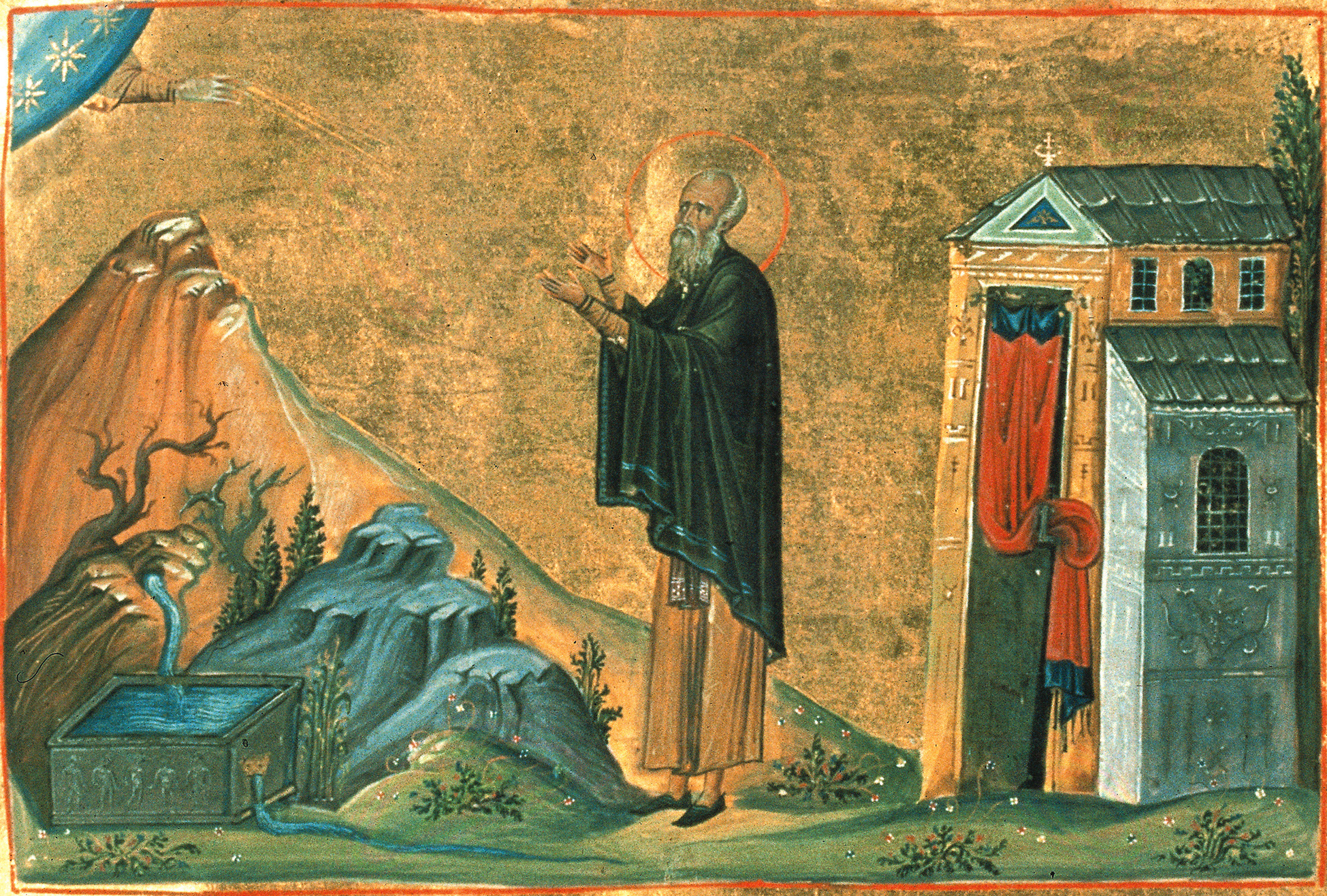
Abraham Kidunaia

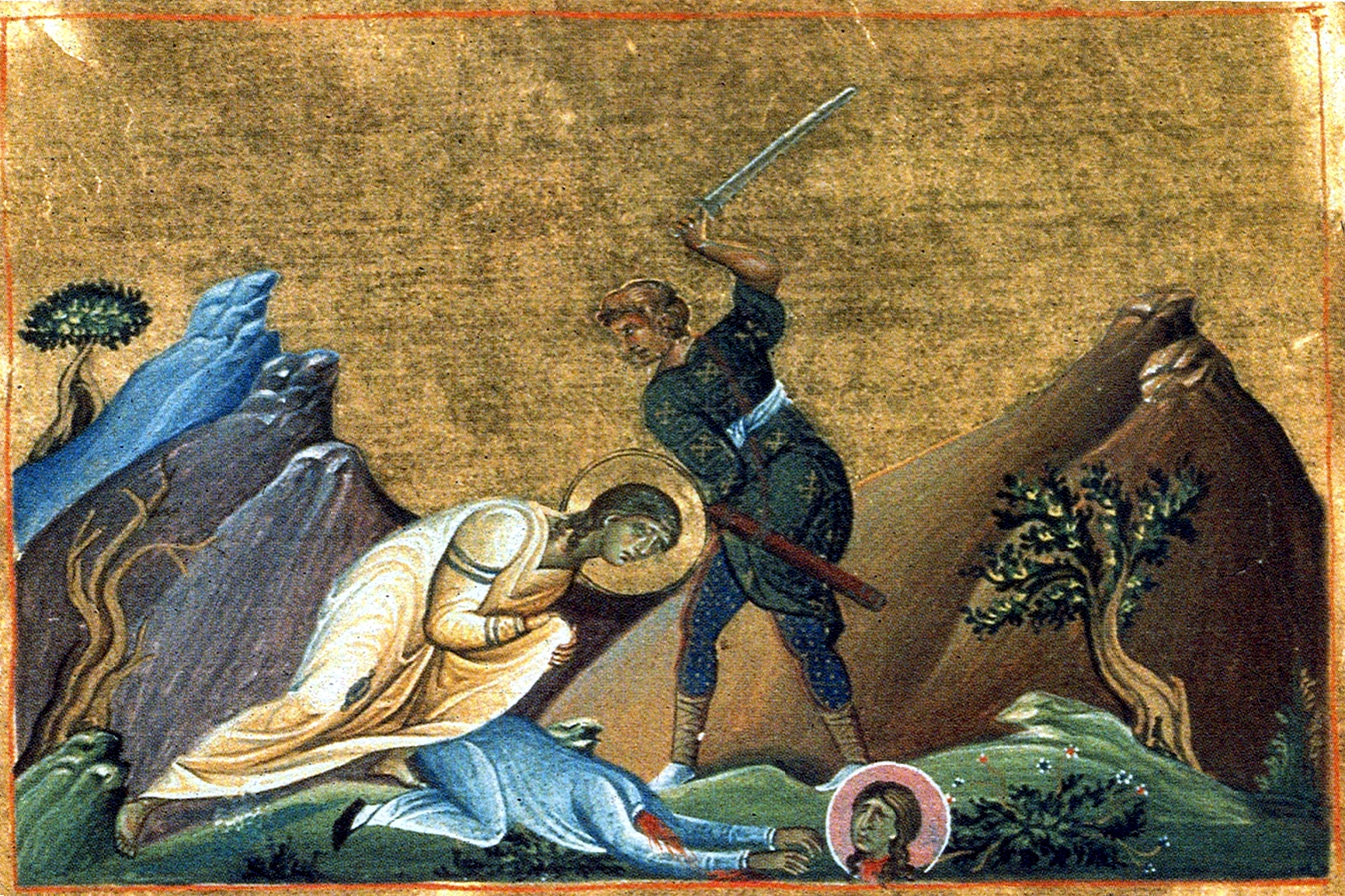
Basilissa and Anastasia of Rome

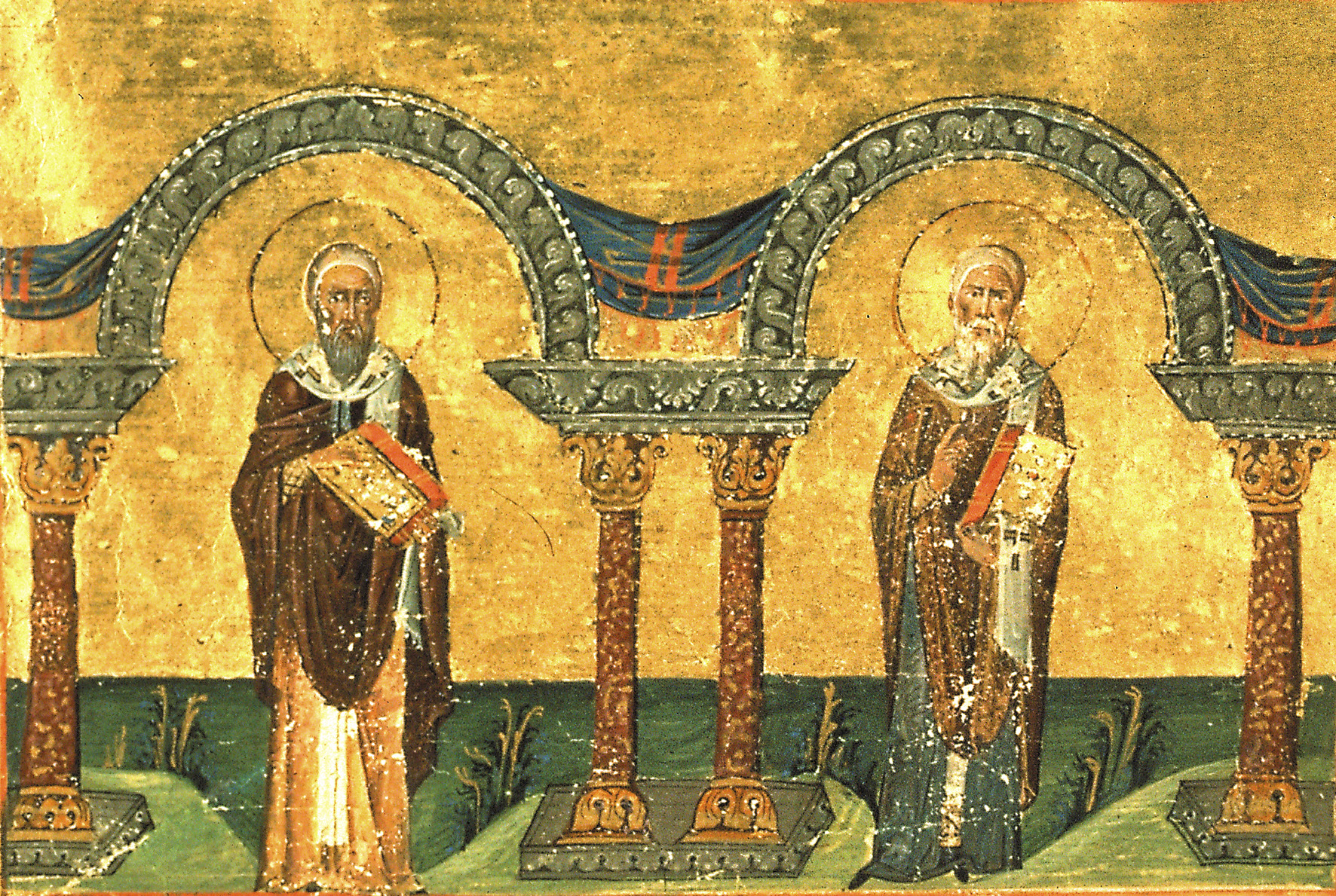
Athanasius and Cyril of Alexandria

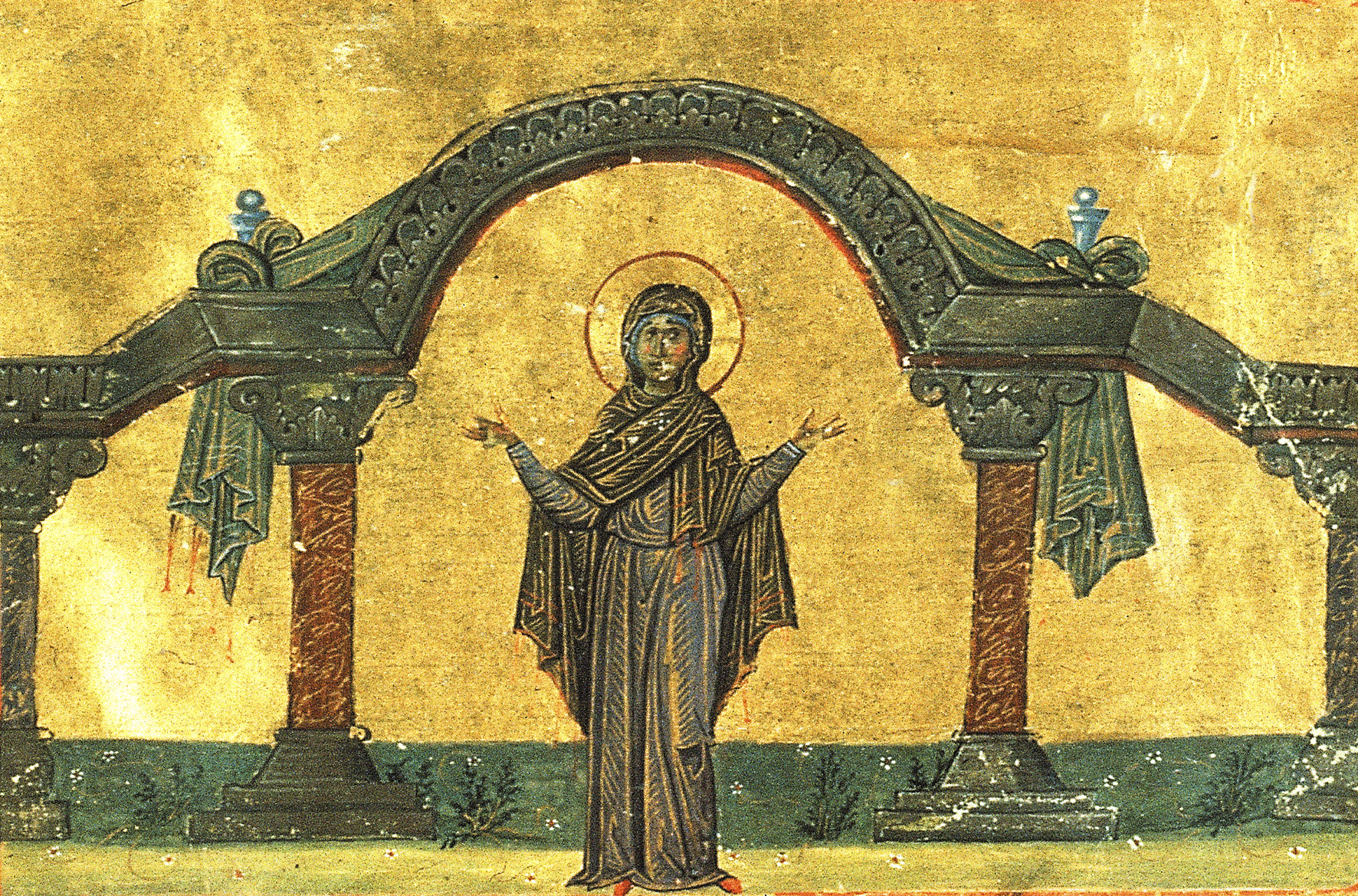
Domnina of Syria

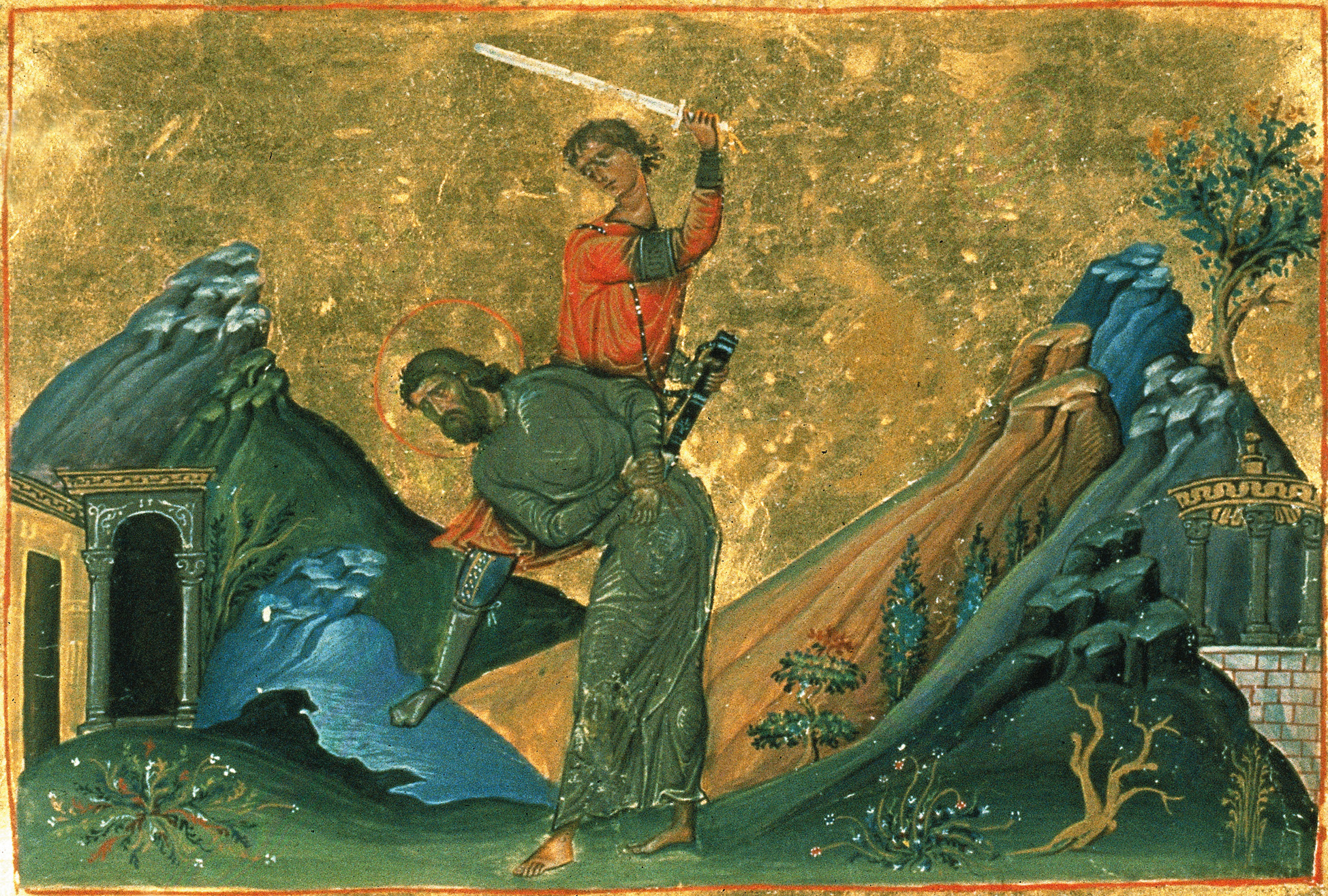
Epimachus of Alexandria

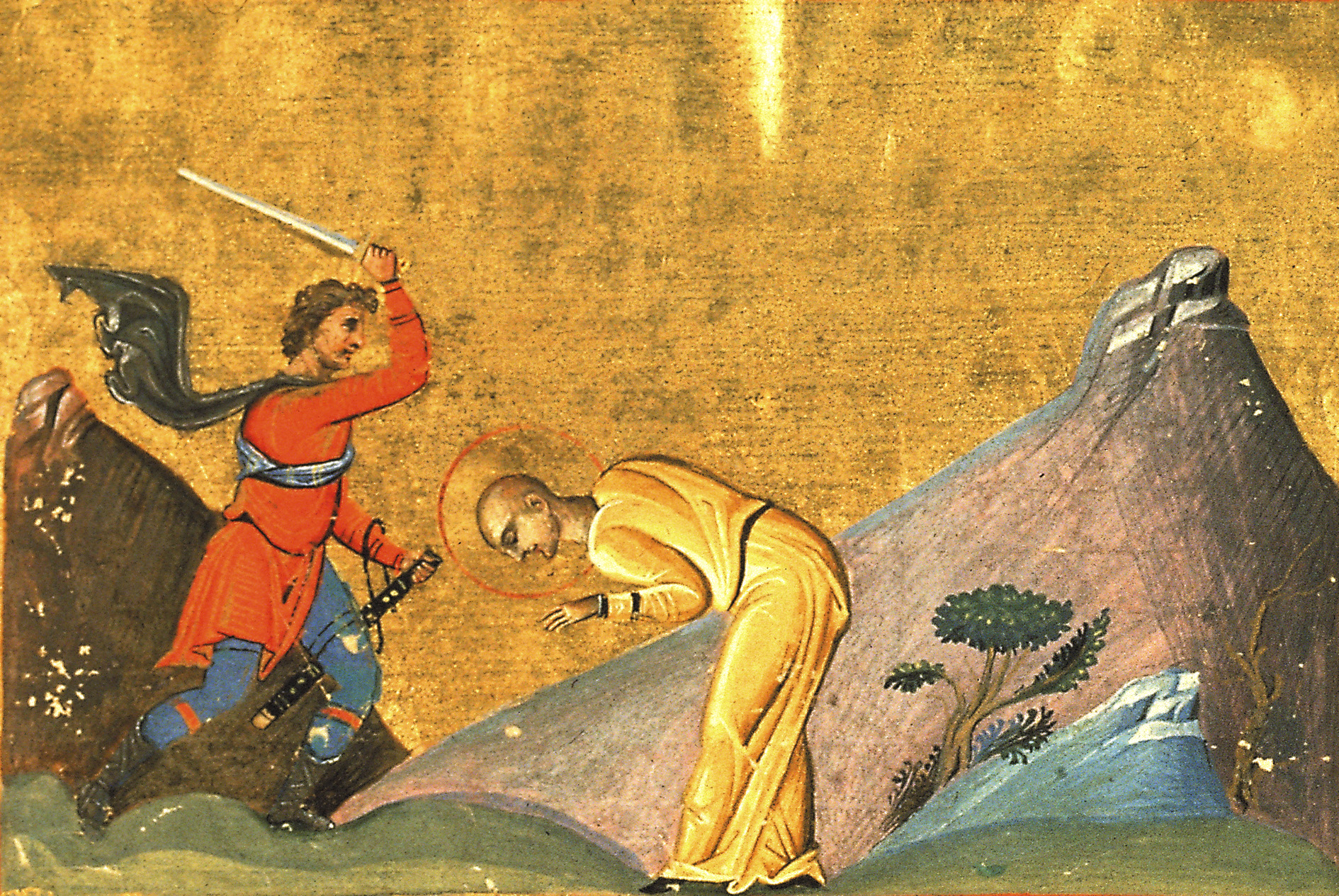
Tatiana of Rome

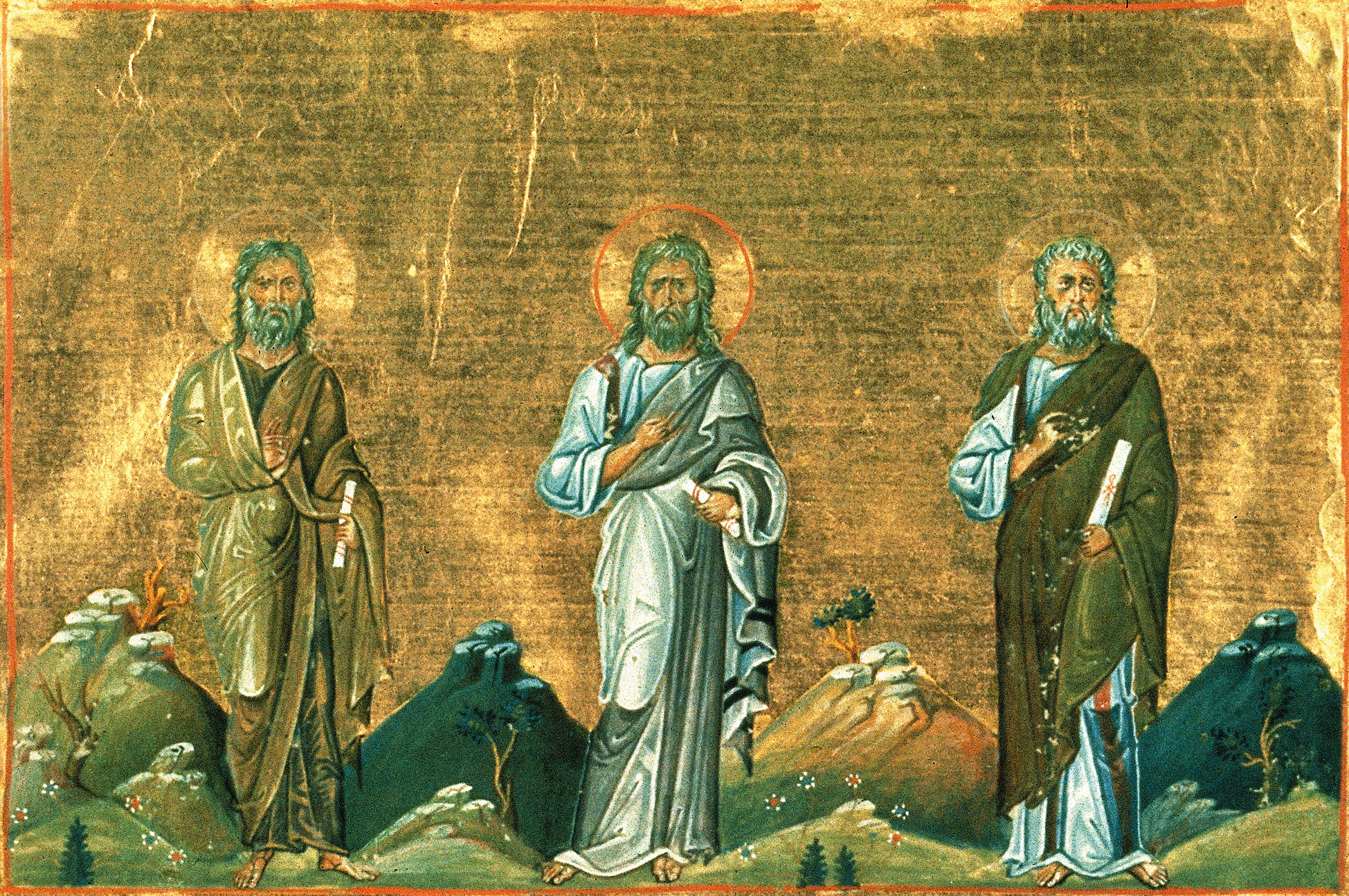
Holy Patriarchs

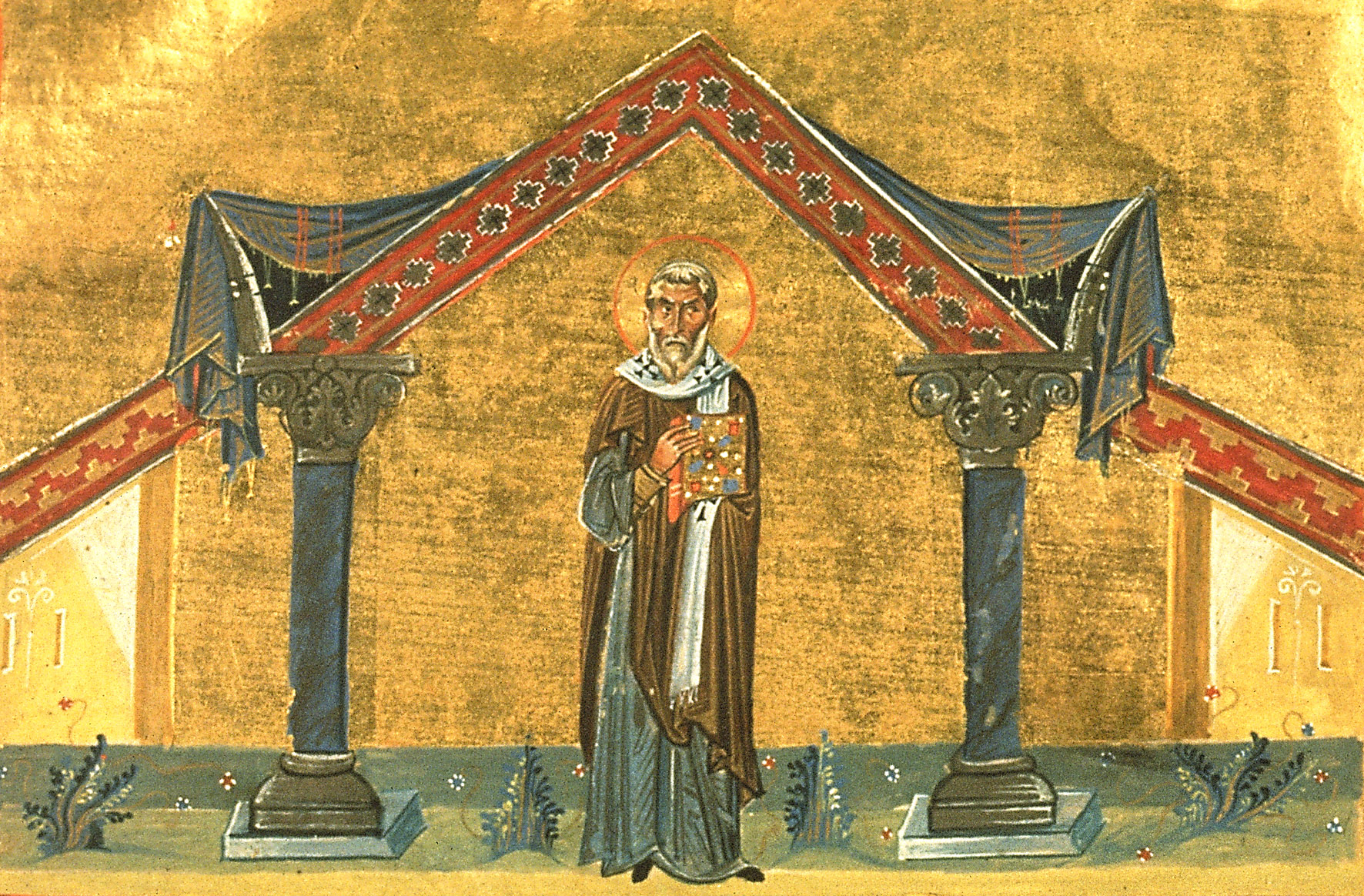
Pope Agatho

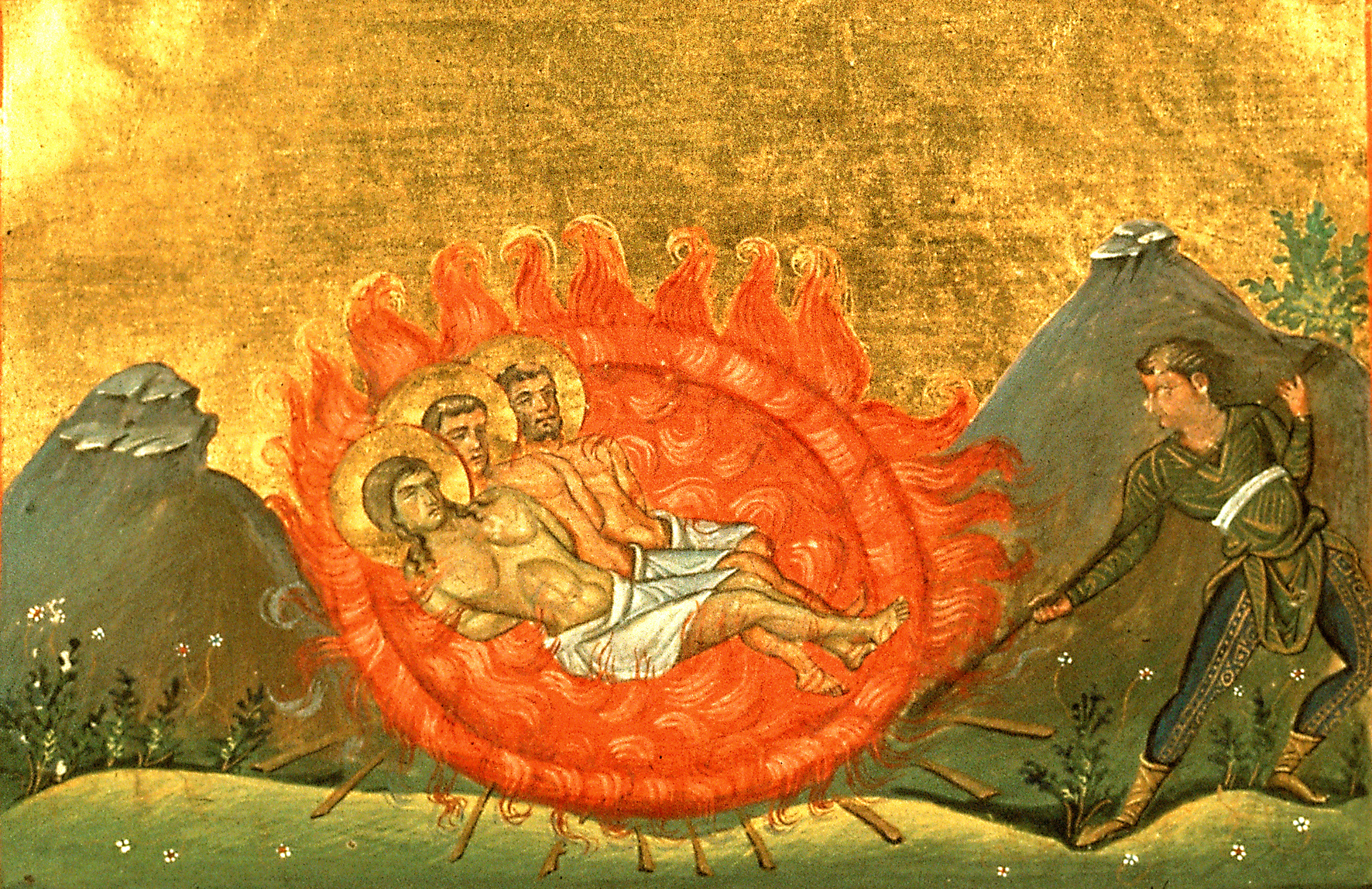
Fausta with Evilasius and Maximus at Cyzicus

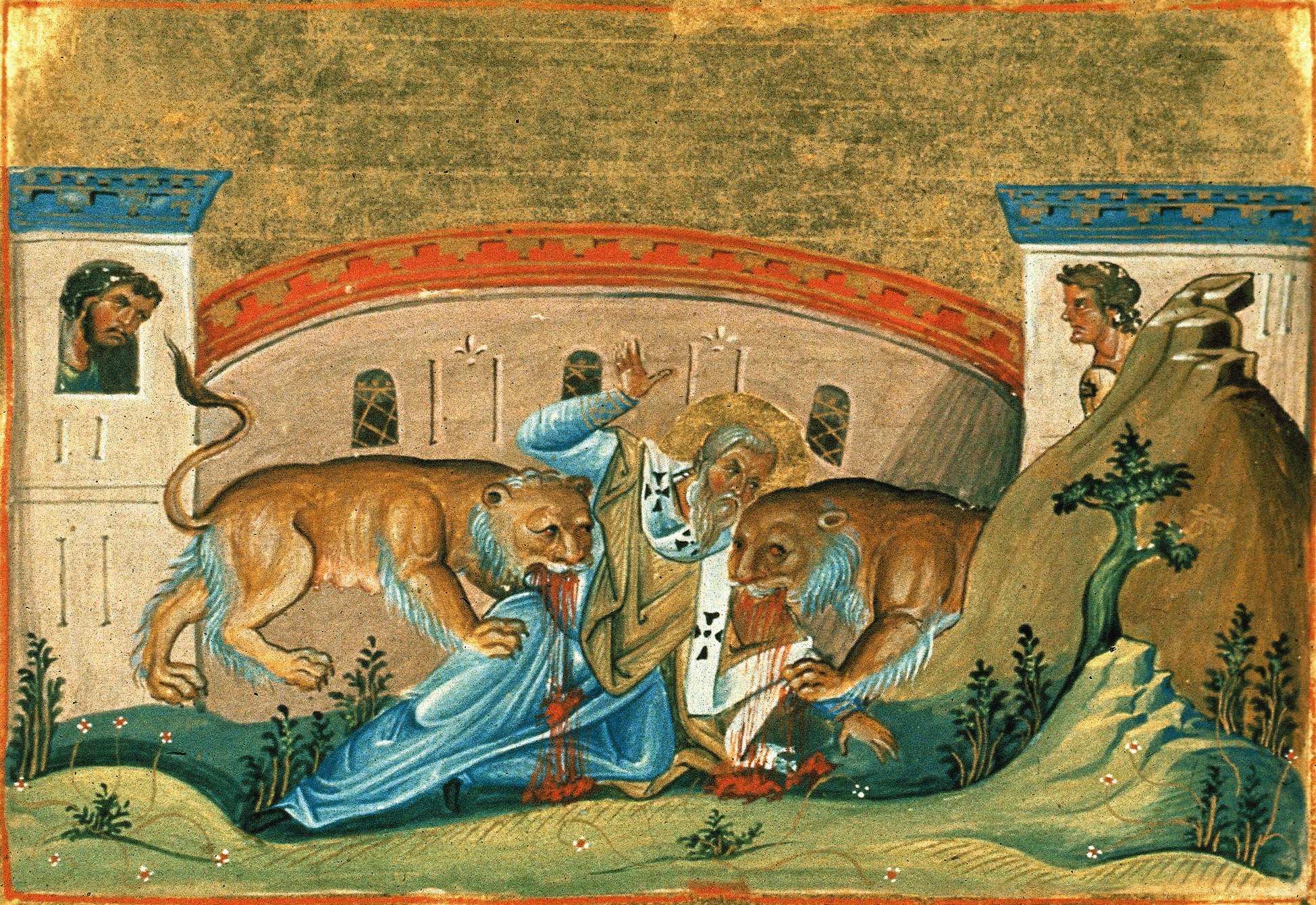
Ignatius of Antioch

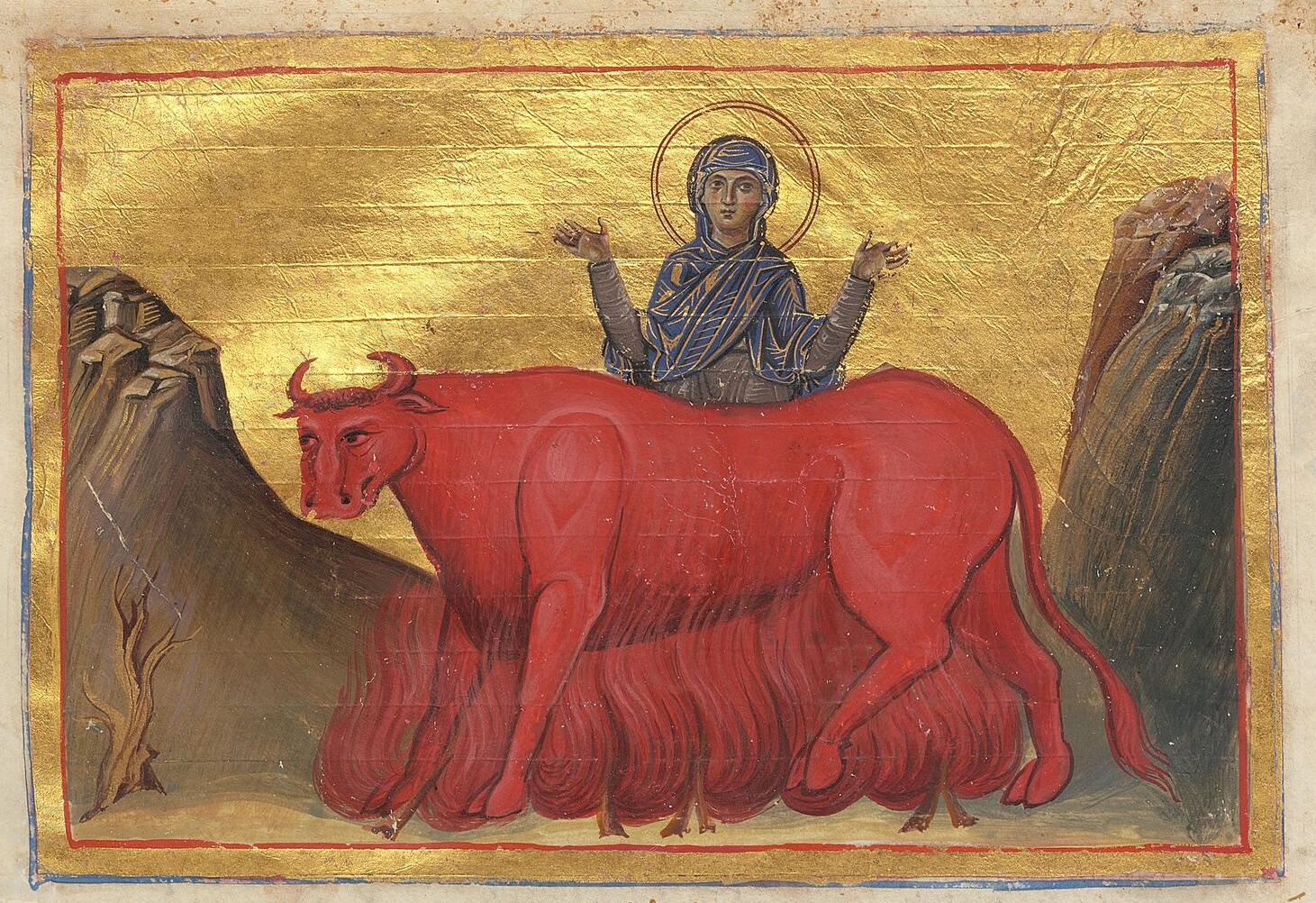
Pelagia of Tarsus
