= Pelagia the Virgin =

Christian saint, virgin and martyr

Saint Pelagia
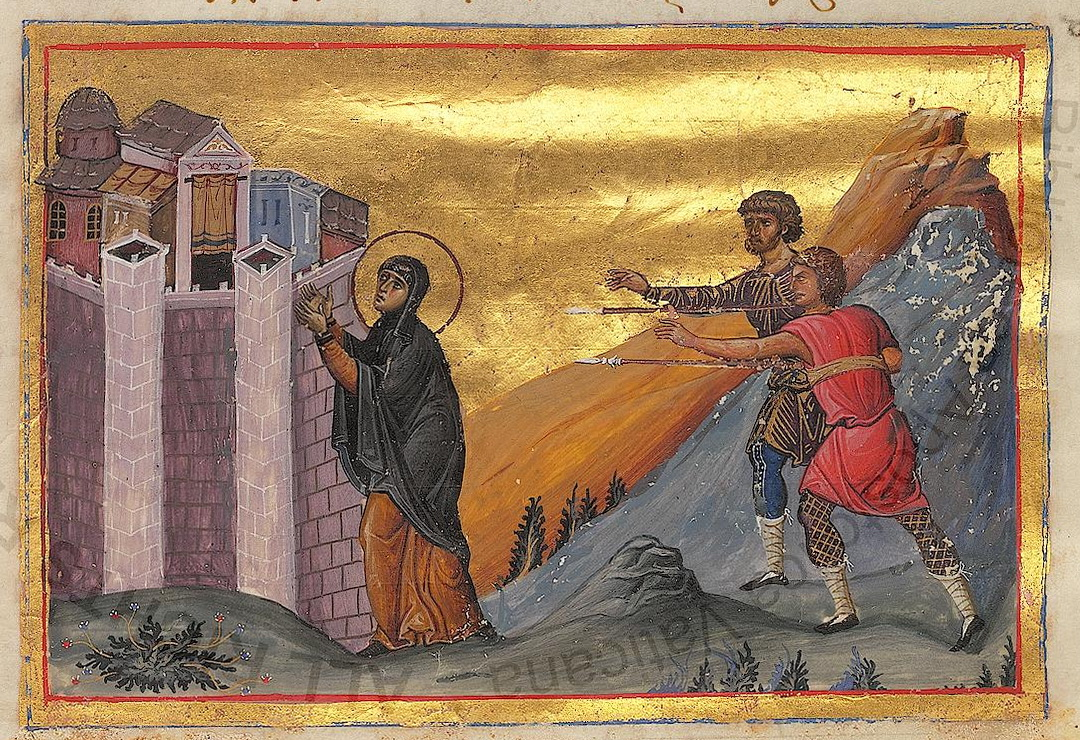
- The martyrdom of Saint Pelagia as depicted in the Menologion of Basil II

Virgin martyr
- Born: late 3rd century
- Residence: Antioch
- Died: Antioch
- Venerated in: Eastern Orthodox Church; Roman Catholic Church
- Major shrine: Antioch
- Feast: 8 October (Eastern Orthodox); 9 June (Roman Catholic); 5 October (Naples)

Pelagia the Virgin (Ancient Greek: Πελαγία, d. 303), also known as Pelagia of Antioch, was a Christian saint and virgin martyr who leapt to her death during the Diocletianic Persecution in refusal to offer a public sacrifice to the pagan gods by Roman soldiers, or to do "something unspeakable (for she was a virgin)", typically inferred as the Roman soldiers attempting to rape her. She is venerated as a saint in the Eastern Orthodox Church and Roman Catholic Church.

== Life ==
Pelagia is mentioned by St. Ambrose of Milan and was the subject of two sermons by St. John Chrysostom. She was 15 years old when Roman soldiers arrived while she was home alone during the Diocletian Persecution. She came out to meet them and, discovering they intended to compel her to participate in a pagan sacrifice, she received permission to change her clothes. She went to the roof of her house and threw herself into the sea. The patristic sources treat this as a sacred martyrdom.

== Legacy ==
Pelagia's story was the probable basis for the later dubious accounts of Pelagia of Tarsus.

== Veneration ==
She is venerated as a saint in the Eastern Orthodox Church and Roman Catholic Church.

Originally, her feast day was celebrated on 8 October across the entire Christian Church, in common with SS Pelagia the Harlot and Pelagia of Tarsus. It is still her feast day in the Eastern Orthodox Church. After the Great Schism, it came to be celebrated on 9 June in the Roman Catholic Church and, in Naples, Italy, she is celebrated on 5 October.

== See also ==
- SS Marina the Monk & Margaret the Virgin, with whom she is also conflated
