= Pelagia Gesiou-Faltsi =

Pelayia Yessiou-Faltsi (Greek: Πελαγία Γέσιου-Φαλτσή) (born 1935) is a leading scholar in the field of civil procedure in Greece. She is emeritus professor at the Law Faculty of the Aristotle University of Thessaloniki. She has been teaching there for more than forty-five years and served as the Faculty’s Dean from 1994–1997. She teaches at the Greek National School of Judiciary and has been a visiting professor at Tulane University.

Gesiou-Faltsi has written eleven books and over eighty essays and articles on civil litigation, evidence law, international civil procedural law, and enforcement law. She is the author of a three volume series on enforcement law, widely regarded as the first complete work in this field to be published in Greece. Her book Civil Procedure in Greece was the first to be published on this subject in English and is widely referenced by legal scholars, lawyers and judges.

She is a member of the Council of the International Association of Procedural Law and of the International Academy of Comparative Law. She has been a member of the Supreme Constitutional Court of Greece (1987–1989).

She received an honorary doctorate from the Faculty of Law of the University of Athens in 2006 and was elected corresponding member of the Academy of Athens in March 2007.
