= Pelagia of Tarsus =

Christian saint and martyr

Saint Pelagia of Tarsus
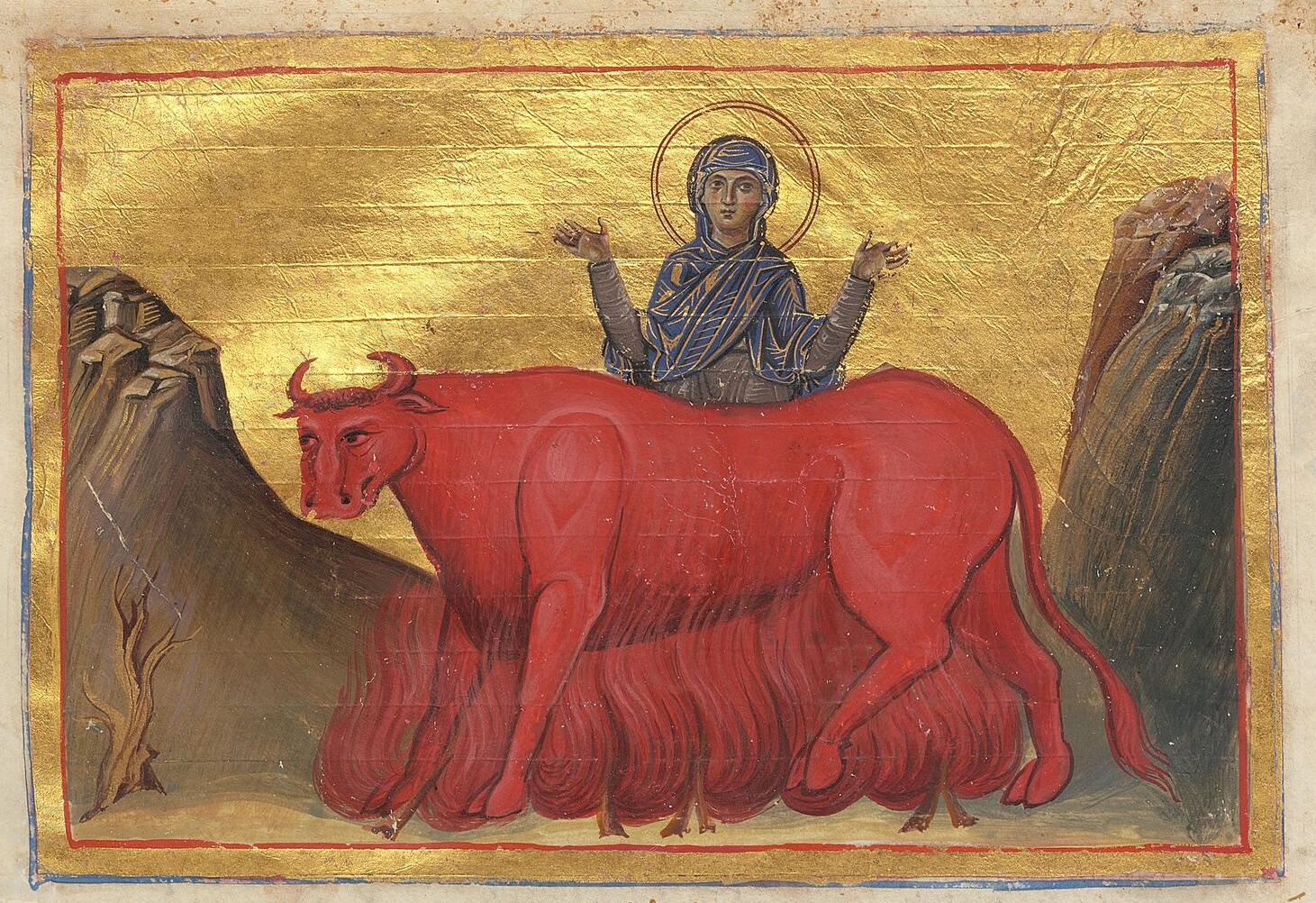
- Miniature from the Menologion of Basil II
- Born: c. 3rd century AD; Tarsus, Cilicia, Roman Empire
- Died: 301–305 AD; Rome, Italy, Roman Empire
- Venerated in: Eastern Orthodox Church; Roman Catholic Church
- Feast: 4 May (Eastern Orthodox and Roman Catholic); 8 October(Eastern Orthodox)

Pelagia (Ancient Greek: Πελαγία; d. early 4th century), distinguished as Pelagia of Tarsus and Pelagia the Martyr (Πελαγία ἡ Μάρτυς, Pelagía ē Mártys), was a legendary Christian saint and martyr who lived in Tarsus in Cilicia (southeastern Asia Minor) during the reign of Roman emperor Diocletian. Originally, her feast day was celebrated on October 8, in common with Saints Pelagia the Virgin & Pelagia the Harlot, both of Antioch.

== Legend ==
According to legend, Diocletian's son, the heir to the throne, fell in love with her and wanted to marry Pelagia. She replied that she could not, because she had sworn to preserve her virginity and was wedded to Christ. In his sorrow, Diocletian's son committed suicide. Pelagia was sent to Rome by her pagan mother, where Diocletian asked her to become his wife. She refused, calling the emperor insane. She was then burnt to death, and her flesh melted and smells of myrrh pervaded throughout Rome. By some versions, she was burned within a brazen bull. The story concludes by relating that the pagans sent four lions to surround her bones, but instead they protected her bones from vultures and crows until a Christian bishop could recover them.

== History ==
There is little historical base to the story, as Diocletian had a daughter Valeria but no sons—a fact of considerable importance to the history of his reign. Probably, commemorations of the historical martyr Pelagia at Tarsus were probably embellished and given a local setting at some point.

Constantine the Great built a church on the reputed site of her remains.

== See also ==
- Other saints Pelagia
