= Saint Mary the Monk =

5th century Byzantine saint

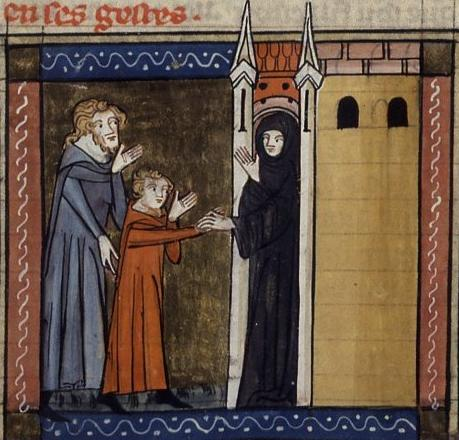
- Marinos (in red) being brought to a monastery by his father Eugenius. 14th century French manuscript.

Confessor and Wonderworker
- Born: Fifth century Al-Qalamoun (present-day Lebanon)
- Died: Uncertain
- Venerated in: Maronite Catholic Church; Eastern Orthodox Church; Coptic Orthodox Church; Episcopal Church (United States); Druze faith
- Feast: February 12; June 18; July 17; Mesra 15
- Patronage: Pregnant women, girls
- Controversy: Biological woman joins monastery, falsely accused of fathering a child

Mary the Monk, (Note: Other names include Marina the Syrian, Mary of Alexandria (Coptic: Ϯⲁⲅⲓⲁ Ⲙⲁⲣⲓⲛⲁ ⲛ̅ⲁⲥⲕⲏⲧⲏⲥ), Mariam, and Pelagia (this being the Greek equivalent of 'Marina'; see Pelagia)) also known as Marinos the Monk, or Mary/Marinos, as well being known by the Latin version of her name, Marina, was a Christian saint from part of Asian Byzantium, generally said to be present-day Lebanon. Mary/Marinos probably lived in the 5th century CE, her first hagiographical account was written in Greek, probably sometime between 525 and 650 CE; it is preserved in several manuscripts, including one from the tenth century CE. Details of her life may vary, due to versions of her Life being reproduced in Coptic, Syriac, Ethiopian, Armenian, Arabic, French and German. (Note: "The availability of Marina's story in Syriac, Coptic, Latin, Arabic, Ethiopic, French, High German, Greek, and Armenian made her known to believers in the East as well as in the West. Her local cult was transformed through these translations into a universal one and Marina's hometown or country of origin became that of each of the towns or countries that adopted her venerable story. [...] These manuscripts are silent about the place of Marina's birth and life. However, Clugnet believes that the only origin of Saint Marina must be the one known to us according to tradition. According to Clugnet, since the only tradition about this saint is found among the Maronites of Lebanon, then Lebanon is to be considered the land of Marina's birth. [...] As to the century in which this saint has lived...Clugnet believes that it must have been the fifth century". (Hourani, p. 19–21))

== Legend ==
Mary was the child of wealthy Christian parents and was born in Al-Qalamoun, near Tripoli, in present-day Lebanon. Her mother died when she was very young, and so Mary was raised as a devout Christian by her father, Eugenios. Once he felt Mary was old enough, Eugenios decided it was time for him to enter a monestary, which would mean leaving his daughter behind. Mary, upon learning of his plan, asked: "Father, do you wish to save your own soul and see mine destroyed?". He responded: “Child, what am I to do with you? You are a female, and I desire to enter a monastery. How then can you remain with me? For it is through the members of your sex that the devil wages war on the servants of God.” Mary then suggested that they could both live as monks together, so Eugenios shaved her head, changed her into men's clothing and gave her the new name, Marinos. He then gave all his possessions to the poor and travelled with Marinos to live within a monastic community. As Marinos' was "beardless and of delicate voice", some of her fellow monks thought her to be a eunuch and others assumed that these were side effects of her ascetism.

After Marinos' father died, the monk remained in the monestary and excelled in asceticism, which resulted in the receipt of the Spiritual Gift of Healing. One day, the abbot of the monastery sent Marinos along with three other monks to attend to some business outside of the monastery. As the journey was long, they were forced to spend the night at an inn. Also lodging there was a soldier, who, either seduced, or raped, the daughter of the innkeeper, taking her virginity. The soldier then instructed her to say, "The young monk from the monestary, the attractive one called Marinos, he made me pregnant", should she conceive a child.

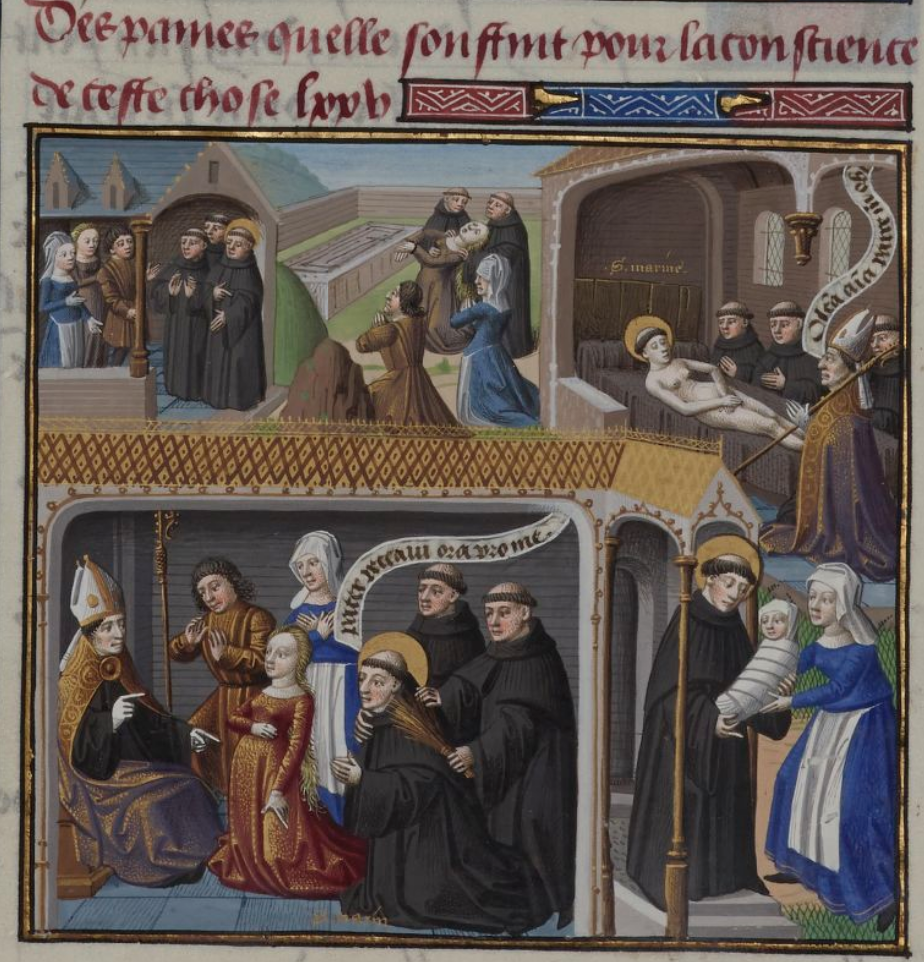
Holy Mary accused, miniature in Speculum Historiale by Vincent of Beauvais, 1423.

After some time, it was discovered that the inn keeper's daughter was pregnant and, as was agreed, she told her father that “The young monk from the monastery, the attractive one called Marinos, he made me pregnant.” The innkeeper, enraged, went to the monestary to speak with the abbot. The abbot severely reprimanded Marinos, who fell to her knees, weeping, and said: “Forgive me, father, for I have sinned as a man.” Marinos accepted the false accusation as if it were true, and received the punishment, preferring to be seen as a man, rather than as Mary. The abbot ordered Marinos to leave the monastery, afterwhich she lived outside the monestary gates.

When the innkeeper's daughter gave birth to a boy, he gave him to Marinos to raise the child. Marinos "nursed the child as its father" with sheep's milk, provided by the local shepherds, and remained caring for him outside the monastery for three years. Eventually, the monks convinced the abbot to allow Marinos to return; but he also imposed heavy penalties upon Marinos, who had to perform "the lowliest chores", while caring for the child.

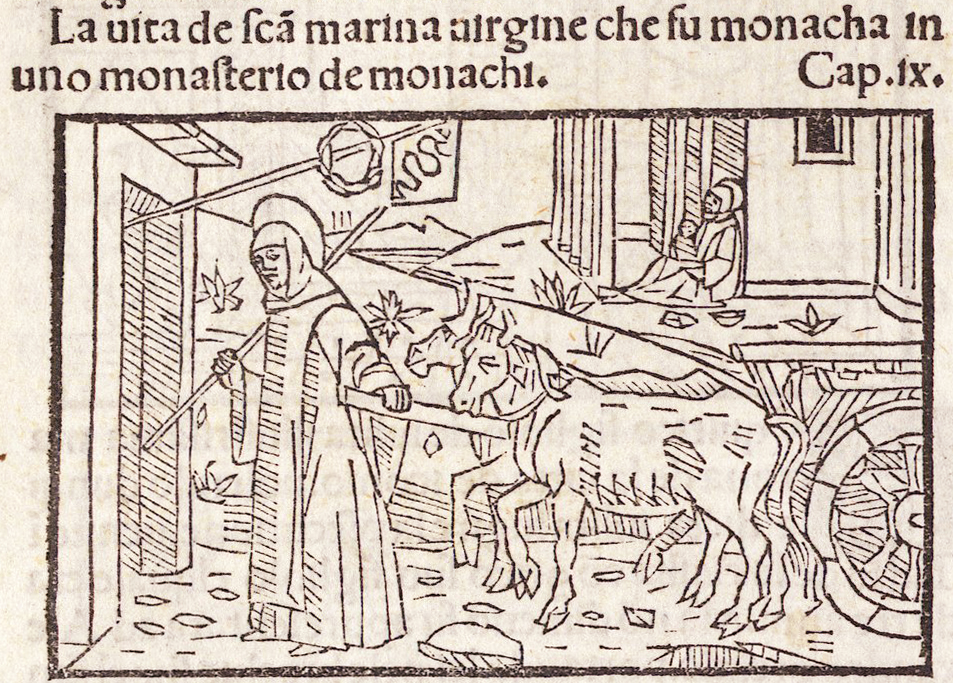
Mary in the Golden Legend (1497)

According to the Greek text, Marinos dies "after a considerable passage of time," from when she is allowed back into the monestary, and in the Coptic version of the Life, this is when the monk is forty years old. Marinos became ill, and died three days later. It was when Marinos' corpse was cleaned, changed into new clothes, and transferred to the church for funeral prayers that the monks discovered that Marinos was female. This realisation made them all distressed; the abbot wept bitterly for the false punishing of the monk. The abbot then called for the inn keeper to inform him that Marinos was a woman who had been wrongly accused. The inn keeper also wept for the injusticed which he had caused Marinos. After burying Marinos' body, the possessed daughter of the inkeeper turned up and made her confession concerning the true identity of the man who got her pregnant; she was then healed.

In the Coptic version it is said that during the funeral prayers a monk who was blind in one eye recovered full sight, after touching Mary/Marinos' corpse.

== Historical context ==
Entering religious life

Although there was the role of Deaconess in the Byzantine church, St Mary did not follow this route in. Depending on whether they were born in the 4th, or 8th century, under the Diocletianic Persecution and the suppression of Christianity, followed by its further institutionalization by Constantine the Great leadership roles in the church for women decreased.

This could of been due to restrictions on her location, or because of the dangerous norm being marrying so young within Byzantine gender roles, and the demand on women to procreate as much as possible as to heighten chances of infant survival, Marina's choice and their fathers respect enabled to join the monastery.

== Veneration ==
In the Synaxarion of Constantinople, Mary is celebrated on 12 February. She continues to be venerated, with her father, in the Eastern Orthodox Church; their feast day is also on 12 February.

Mary is also venerated in Coptic Orthodox Church, who spell her name "Marina" or "Mariam/Marina." Today, Coptic Orthodox Christians claim that Mary's body is kept at Saint Mary Church and has not decomposed; it is displayed to the public on Marina's feast day, on Mesra 15.

In 2022, Mary, called "Marina the Monk" was officially added to the Episcopal Church liturgical calendar with a feast day on 17 June.

Mary is also honoured among the Druze, who call her "Al-Sitt Sha'wani'". The shrine of "Al-Sitt Sha'wani'" is located in Amiq on the slopes of Mount Barouk (Jebel el-Barouk) to the east, overlooking the Bekaa Valley and offering views of the much higher Mount Hermon to the south.

== Legacy ==
Marinos is often called, (or compared to) a transgender man. He is considered a part of LGBTQ+ history and has gained recent attention especially among Christians, the LGBTQ+ community, and LGBTQ+ Christians.
