= Pelagia =

Antiochene saint

Saint Pelagia
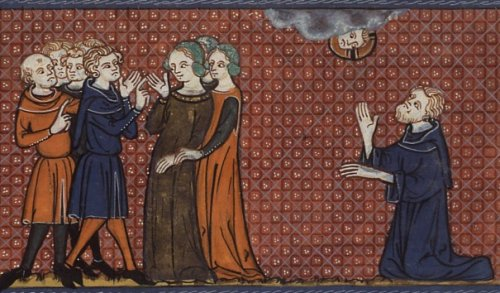
- Margarita among her courtesans, as Saint Nonnus prays for her (14th-century MS)

Confessor
- Born: 290? AD; Antioch, Syria Palaestina
- Died: 305 AD Removed ref History section, and that Nonnus was late 4th century Mount of Olives, Palaestina, Eastern Roman Empire
- Venerated in: Roman Catholic Church; Eastern Orthodox Church; Syriac Orthodox Church; Armenian Apostolic Church
- Feast: 8 October; Tuesday after fourth Sunday of the Exaltation of the Cross (Armenian Apostolic Church)

Pelagia (Ancient Greek: Πελαγία, d. 457), distinguished as Pelagia of Antioch, or Pelagia the Penitent, was a hermit and saint in the 4th or 5th century. Her feast day was celebrated on 8 October, originally in common with Saints Pelagia the Virgin and Pelagia of Tarsus. (Note: The Roman Martyrology eventually distinguished the dates of the other Pelagias, removing them to other months.) Pelagia died as a result of extreme asceticism, which had emaciated her to the point she could no longer be recognized. According to Orthodox tradition, she was buried in her cell on the Mount of Olives. Upon the discovery that the renowned monk had been a woman, the holy fathers tried to keep it a secret, but the gossip spread and her relics drew pilgrims from as far off as Jericho and the Jordan valley.

Saint Pelagia is one of several classical Christian desert ascetics whose gender identity is often up for debate. This is due to physical descriptors used within the mythos often leaning towards masculine.

== Legend ==
Pelagia's story is attributed to James or Jacob (Latin: Jacobus), deacon of the church of Heliopolis (modern Baalbek). He states that Margarita was the "foremost actress" and a prominent harlot in Antioch. During one of the city's church councils, she passed by on a donkey surrounded by her entourage and a "worldly crowd". Perfumed and "immodestly bareheaded", the outlines of her body were "clearly visible" beneath her gold cloth, pearls, and precious stones, which ran from her bare shoulders to her feet. Most of the fathers were shamed into looking away, but the bishop Nonnus stared openly and confessed himself "delighted". Mocking his fellows, he condemned both them and himself for taking less care of their souls than she had of her body.

She appeared at his next Sunday sermon and Nonnus's sermon on hell and the goodness of paradise prompted her to repent. She had two of her slaves trail Nonnus to his residence and then wrote him on wax tablets, calling herself "sinful" and a "servant of the devil" but seeking mercy from God, who "came down to earth not for the sake of the righteous but to save sinners". Nonnus replied to the anonymous request that God knew her and her past and that he would receive her, but only in the presence of the other bishops.

She went to the basilica of Saint Julian to see them; when Nonnus demanded surety that she would not return to her former life, she fell to the ground and threatened that if she were refused admission to the Church, all her future sins would be held against him at his judgment. The archbishop was informed and sent the deaconess Romana to clothe her in the baptismal gown. Nonnus took her confession and baptized "Margarita" under her birth name Pelagia, with Romana serving as her godmother.

The devil shortly afterward arrived to complain, but was driven off when Pelagia made the Sign of the Cross and breathed upon him. He returned the next night to renew his complaints and was driven off the same way. On the third day, Pelagia directed her steward to inventory her possessions. She then turned them over to Nonnus, who disbursed them to the widows, orphans, and poor of the city. She freed her slaves, male and female, "taking their golden torcs off with her own hands". She then began living with Romana.

The night before it came time to remove her baptismal gown, she stole out in the dark wearing one of Nonnus's chitons. She headed for Jerusalem, where she built a cell on the Mount of Olives. According to Latin translation, her cell consisted of four walls and a single window. In Syriac translation, the cell is a structure that is able to be physically left.

She lived there for three or four years, disguising herself as a male recluse and eunuch under the name Pelagius. She then died, the cause having been alluded to extreme asceticism, which had emaciated her to the point she could no longer be recognized. According to Orthodox tradition, Pelagia was buried in her cell. Upon the discovery that the renowned monk had been a woman, the "holy fathers" tried to keep it a secret, but the gossip spread and her relics drew pilgrims from as far off as Jericho and the Jordan valley.

The Latin and Syriac translation states that the narrator, James, visits Pelagia one time before she died, encouraged by the Bishop Nonnus. Upon finding the cell Pelagia resided in and knocking on her window, she instantly recognizes him. Regardless of her recognition of him, he does not recognize her, and believes he is seeing the monk Pelagius for the first time, rather than Pelagia, the female convert.

The story appeared in the Greek Menaea. It significantly omits dates and (on eight occasions) the name of the archbishop under whom Nonnus served. (Note: One Greek account refers to the archbishop as Flavianus (r. 381–404), although Cameron dismisses its testimony.)

== History ==
The historical lives of saints have long been used as a tool of inspired conversion. Saint Pelagia of Antioch's life is often compared to the several other desert bound female aesitics, such as Mary of Egypt or Saint Thaïs. Many of these Lives have a somewhat clear origin and development, often orally passed down. Saint Pelagia however, has murky origins, her story leading to great controversy among scholars. Due to this controversy, two major theories about her origins have formed. The first theory states that the historical Saint Pelagia of Antioch as described by Saint Ambrose, which had appeared almost a thousand years prior to James the Deacon's account is the origin of the monk Pelagius discussed in this article.

== Similar accounts ==
Saint Marina, the Latin equivalent of "Pelagia", was a bride who disguised herself as a monk, in her case to escape an unwanted marriage. (Note: A third St Pelagia of Antioch was Saint Margaret, whose name derives from its earlier form "Margarita".) Aspects of her story was apparently combined with apocryphal accounts of Mary Magdalene, Biblical accounts of Solomon and the Queen of Sheba and of Jesus and various women in the New Testament.

The historical St Pelagia, mentioned by St Ambrose and in two sermons by John Chrysostom, was an Antiochene virgin who was martyred because of her refusal to offer pagan sacrifice during the Diocletianic Persecution. Chrysostom's c. 390 sermon also mentions an anonymous (but apparently famous) actress and prostitute "from a wicked city in Phoenice" (possibly Heliopolis) who seduced "the empress's brother" but converted "in our own day".

== See also ==
- Saints Margaret the Virgin and Marina the Monk, both of whom are sometimes confused or conflated with Pelagia
- The Jerusalem tomb venerated since the Byzantine times as Pelagia's
- Saint Pelagia, patron saint archive
- Agia Pelagia, village in Crete where Pelagia is venerated and a local legend mentions people finding her icon in a cave
