= October 8 =

October 8 this year in various calendars
- Thursday, 8 October 2026
Akan	Foyaw
Armenian	20 Sahmi 1476
Aztec	Izcalli 6, 12 Quiyahuitl
Babylonian	25 Ululu, 2337 SE
Balinese pawukon	Luang, Pepet, Pasah, Sri, Pon, Tungleh, Wraspati of Wayang, Sri, Nohan, Manuh
Bengali	23 Ashshin, BS 1433
Chinese	Yin Wood Rabbit・Well Mansion; Fire Horse Year, Month 8, Day 28 (Hanlu, 15 days until Shuangjiang)
Common Era	8 October 2026 CE
Coptic	28 Thout, AM 1743
Egyptian	25 Mechir, 2775 NE
Ethiopian	28 Maskaram, 2019 Amätä Məhrät
French Republican	Décade II, Sextidi de Vendémiaire de l'Année 235 de la République
Gregorian	8 October, AD 2026
Hebrew	27 Tishrei, AM 5787
Hindu	Pūrvaphalgunī・Śubha; Solar: 22 Āśvina, 1948 SE; Lunisolar: Trayodaśī, Kṛishna pakṣa of Bhādrapada, 2083 VE; Rāudra・5127 KY・1,872,856
Icelandic	Fimmtudagur, 15 Haustmánuður 2026
Islamic	25 Rabi' al-thani, AH 1448 (using tabular method)
ISO week date	2026-W41-4
Japanese	28 Hazuki, Reiwa 8 (Kanro, 15 days until Sōkō)
Julian	25 September, AD 2026 (AM 7534)
Julian day	2461322
Korean	28 Dakdal, 4359 DE
Maya	13.0.13.17.19; 12 Yax, 12 Cauac
Roman	ante diem VII Kalendas Octobres, MMDCCLXXIX AUC
Solar Hijri	16 Mehr, SH 1405
Tibetan	28 khrums, me pho rta 2153 or 1772 or 1000

<<	October					>>
Su	Mo	Tu	We	Th	Fr	Sa
				1	2	3
4	5	6	7	8	9	10
11	12	13	14	15	16	17
18	19	20	21	22	23	24
25	26	27	28	29	30	31
2026

October 8 in recent years
2026 (Thursday)
2025 (Wednesday)
2024 (Tuesday)
2023 (Sunday)
2022 (Saturday)
2021 (Friday)
2020 (Thursday)
2019 (Tuesday)
2018 (Monday)
2017 (Sunday)

October 8 is the 281st day of the year (282nd in leap years) in the Gregorian calendar; 84 days remain until the end of the year.

== Events ==
=== Pre-1600 ===
- 316 – Constantine I defeats Licinius, who loses his European territories.
- 451 – The first session of the Council of Chalcedon begins.
- 876 – Frankish forces led by Louis the Younger prevent a West Frankish invasion and defeat emperor Charles II ("the Bald").
- 1075 – Dmitar Zvonimir is crowned King of Croatia.
- 1200 – Isabella of Angoulême is crowned Queen consort of England.
- 1322 – Mladen II Šubić of Bribir is deposed as the Croatian Ban after the Battle of Bliska.
- 1480 – The Great Stand on the Ugra River puts an end to Tatar rule over Moscow.
- 1573 – The Spanish siege of Alkmaar ends with the first Dutch victory in the Eighty Years' War.

=== 1601–1900 ===
- 1645 – Jeanne Mance opens the first lay hospital of North America in Montreal.
- 1813 – The Treaty of Ried is signed between Bavaria and Austria.
- 1821 – The Peruvian Navy is established during the War of Independence.
- 1829 – Stephenson's Rocket wins the Rainhill Trials.
- 1856 – The Second Opium War between several western powers and China begins with the Arrow Incident.
- 1862 – American Civil War: The Confederate invasion of Kentucky is halted at the Battle of Perryville.
- 1871 – Slash-and-burn land management, months of drought, and the passage of a strong cold front cause the Peshtigo Fire, the Great Chicago Fire and the Great Michigan Fires to break out.
- 1879 – War of the Pacific: The Chilean Navy defeats the Peruvian Navy in the Battle of Angamos.
- 1895 – Korean Empress Myeongseong is assassinated by Japanese infiltrators.

=== 1901–present ===
- 1912 – The First Balkan War begins when Montenegro declares war against the Ottoman Empire.
- 1918 – World War I: Corporal Alvin C. York kills 28 German soldiers and captures 132, for which he was awarded the Medal of Honor.
- 1921 – KDKA in Pittsburgh's Forbes Field conducts the first live broadcast of a football game.
- 1939 – World War II: Germany annexes western Poland.
- 1941 – World War II: During the preliminaries of the Battle of Rostov, German forces reach the Sea of Azov with the capture of Mariupol.
- 1943 – World War II: Around 30 civilians are executed by Friedrich Schubert's paramilitary group in Kallikratis, Crete.
- 1944 – World War II: Captain Bobbie E. Brown earns a Medal of Honor for his actions during the Battle of Crucifix Hill, just outside Aachen.
- 1952 – The Harrow and Wealdstone rail crash in England kills 112 people.
- 1956 – The New York Yankees's Don Larsen pitches the only perfect game in a World Series.
- 1962 – Der Spiegel publishes an article disclosing the sorry state of the Bundeswehr, leading to accusations of treason.
- 1967 – Guerrilla leader Che Guevara and his men are captured in Bolivia. Guevara would be executed the next day.
- 1969 – The opening rally of the Days of Rage occurs, organized by the Weather Underground in Chicago.
- 1970 – Aleksandr Solzhenitsyn wins the Nobel Prize in literature.
- 1973 – Yom Kippur War: Israel loses more than 150 tanks in a failed attack on Egyptian-occupied positions.
- 1973 – Spyros Markezinis begins his 48-day term as prime minister in an abortive attempt to lead Greece to parliamentary rule.
- 1974 – Franklin National Bank collapses due to fraud and mismanagement; at the time it is the largest bank failure in the history of the United States.
- 1978 – Australia's Ken Warby sets the current world water speed record of 275.97 knots at Blowering Dam, Australia.
- 1982 – Poland bans Solidarity and all other trade unions.
- 1986 – An explosion occurs at the Cipel-Marco fur factory in Kwai Chung, Hong Kong, killing 14 and injuring 10.
- 1990 – First Intifada: Israeli police kill 17 Palestinians and wound over 100 near the Dome of the Rock.
- 1991 – Upon the expiration of the Brioni Agreement, Croatia and Slovenia sever all official relations with Yugoslavia.
- 2001 – A twin engine Cessna and a Scandinavian Airlines System jetliner collide in heavy fog during takeoff from Milan, Italy, killing 118 people.
- 2001 – U.S. president George W. Bush announces the establishment of the Office of Homeland Security.
- 2005 – The 7.6 M_{w} Kashmir earthquake leaves 86,000–87,351 people dead, 69,000–75,266 injured, and 2.8 million homeless.
- 2019 – About 200 Extinction Rebellion activists block the gates of Leinster House (parliament) in the Republic of Ireland.
- 2020 – Second Nagorno-Karabakh War: Azerbaijan twice deliberately targets the Church of the Holy Savior Ghazanchetsots of Shusha.

== Births ==
=== Pre-1600 ===
- 319 BC – Pyrrhus of Epirus (died 272 BC)
- 1150 – Narapatisithu, king of Burma (died 1211)
- 1515 – Margaret Douglas, daughter of Archibald Douglas (died 1578)
- 1551 – Giulio Caccini, Italian composer (died 1618)
- 1553 – Jacques Auguste de Thou, French historian (died 1617)
- 1585 – Heinrich Schütz, German organist and composer (died 1672)

=== 1601–1900 ===
- 1609 – John Clarke, English physician (died 1676)
- 1676 – Benito Jerónimo Feijóo y Montenegro, Spanish monk and scholar (died 1764)
- 1713 – Yechezkel Landau, Polish rabbi and author (died 1793)
- 1715 – Michel Benoist, French scientist and missionary (died 1774)
- 1747 – Jean-François Rewbell, French lawyer and politician (died 1807)
- 1753 – Princess Sophia Albertina of Sweden (died 1829)
- 1765 – Harman Blennerhassett, English-Irish lawyer and politician (died 1831)
- 1789 – John Ruggles, American lawyer and politician (died 1874)
- 1789 – William Swainson, English-New Zealand ornithologist and entomologist (died 1855)
- 1807 – Harriet Taylor Mill, English philosopher and activist (died 1858)
- 1818 – John Henninger Reagan, American judge and politician, 3rd Confederate States Secretary of the Treasury (died 1905)
- 1834 – Walter Kittredge, American violinist and composer (died 1905)
- 1845 – Salomon Kalischer, German pianist, composer, and physicist (died 1924)
- 1847 – Rose Scott, Australian activist (died 1925)
- 1848 – Pierre De Geyter, Belgian composer (died 1932)
- 1850 – Henry Louis Le Châtelier, French chemist and academic (died 1936)
- 1860 – John D. Batten, British painter, printmaker and illustrator (died 1932)
- 1863 – Edythe Chapman, American actress (died 1948)
- 1864 – Ozias Leduc, Canadian painter and educator (died 1955)
- 1870 – Louis Vierne, French organist and composer (died 1937)
- 1872 – Mary Engle Pennington, American bacteriological chemist and refrigeration engineer (died 1952)
- 1873 – Ejnar Hertzsprung, Danish chemist and astronomer (died 1967)
- 1873 – Alexey Shchusev, Russian architect and academic, designed Lenin's Mausoleum (died 1949)
- 1875 – Laurence Doherty, English tennis player and golfer (died 1919)
- 1876 – Frederick Montague, 1st Baron Amwell, English lieutenant and politician (died 1966)
- 1877 – Hans Heysen, German-Australian painter (died 1968)
- 1879 – Huntley Gordon, Canadian-American actor (died 1956)
- 1882 – Harry McClintock, American singer-songwriter and poet (died 1957)
- 1883 – Dick Burnett, American singer-songwriter and guitarist (died 1977)
- 1883 – Otto Heinrich Warburg, German physiologist and physician, Nobel Prize laureate (died 1970)
- 1884 – Walther von Reichenau, German field marshal (died 1942)
- 1887 – Ping Bodie, American baseball player (died 1961)
- 1887 – Donie Bush, American baseball player, manager, and team owner (died 1972)
- 1888 – Ernst Kretschmer, German psychiatrist and author (died 1964)
- 1889 – R. Fraser Armstrong, Canadian engineer (died 1983)
- 1889 – Collett E. Woolman, American businessman, co-founded Delta Air Lines (died 1966)
- 1890 – Snuffy Browne, Barbadian cricketer (died 1964)
- 1890 – Eddie Rickenbacker, American soldier and pilot, Medal of Honor recipient (died 1973)
- 1890 – Philippe Thys, Belgian cyclist (died 1971)
- 1892 – Marina Tsvetaeva, Russian poet and author (died 1941)
- 1893 – Clarence Williams, American pianist and composer (died 1965)
- 1895 – Zog I of Albania (died 1961)
- 1895 – Juan Perón, Argentinian general and politician, 29th President of Argentina (died 1974)
- 1896 – Julien Duvivier, French director, producer, and screenwriter (died 1967)
- 1897 – Rouben Mamoulian, Georgian-American director and screenwriter (died 1987)
- 1897 – Marcel Herrand, French actor (died 1953)

=== 1901–present ===
- 1901 – Eivind Groven, Norwegian composer and theorist (died 1977)
- 1901 – Mark Oliphant, Australian physicist, humanitarian and politician, Governor of South Australia (died 2000)
- 1901 – Saumyendranath Tagore, Indian revolutionary and thinker, founder of the Revolutionary Communist Party of India (died 1974)
- 1903 – Georgy Geshev, Bulgarian chess player (died 1937)
- 1904 – Yves Giraud-Cabantous, French racing driver (died 1973)
- 1907 – Richard Sharpe Shaver, American author and illustrator (died 1975)
- 1908 – Ezekias Papaioannou, Greek-Cypriot politician (died 1988)
- 1910 – Kirk Alyn, American actor (died 1999)
- 1910 – Paulette Dubost, French actress (died 2011)
- 1910 – Gus Hall, American soldier and politician (died 2000)
- 1910 – Helmut Kallmeyer, German chemist and soldier (died 2006)
- 1910 – Ray Lewis, Canadian runner (died 2003)
- 1910 – Wally Moses, American baseball player (died 1990)
- 1913 – Robert R. Gilruth, American pilot and engineer (died 2000)
- 1913 – Marios Makrionitis, Roman Catholic Archbishop of Athens (died 1959)
- 1917 – Billy Conn, American boxer (died 1993)
- 1917 – Walter Lord, American historian and author (died 2002)
- 1917 – Rodney Robert Porter, English biochemist and physiologist, Nobel Prize laureate (died 1985)
- 1918 – Halfdan Hegtun, Norwegian radio host and politician (died 2012)
- 1918 – Jens Christian Skou, Danish chemist and physiologist, Nobel Prize laureate (died 2018)
- 1919 – Kiichi Miyazawa, Japanese politician, 78th Prime Minister of Japan (died 2007)
- 1920 – Frank Herbert, American journalist, photographer, and author (died 1986)
- 1921 – Abraham Sarmiento, Filipino lawyer and jurist (died 2010)
- 1922 – Nils Liedholm, Swedish footballer, coach, and manager (died 2007)
- 1924 – Alphons Egli, Swiss lawyer and politician, 77th President of the Swiss Confederation (died 2016)
- 1924 – Aloísio Lorscheider, Brazilian cardinal (died 2007)
- 1924 – Thirunalloor Karunakaran, Indian poet and scholar (died 2006)
- 1924 – John Nelder, English mathematician and statistician (died 2010)
- 1925 – Álvaro Magaña, Salvadoran economist and politician, President of El Salvador (died 2001)
- 1926 – Raaj Kumar, Indian police officer and actor (died 1996)
- 1927 – Jim Elliot, American missionary and translator (died 1956)
- 1927 – César Milstein, Argentinian-English biochemist and academic, Nobel Prize laureate (died 2002)
- 1928 – Didi, Brazilian footballer and manager (died 2001)
- 1928 – M. Russell Ballard, American lieutenant and religious leader (died 2023)
- 1928 – Neil Harvey, Australian cricketer
- 1928 – Bill Maynard, English actor (died 2018)
- 1929 – Betty Boothroyd, English politician, British Speaker of the House of Commons (died 2023)
- 1930 – Pepper Adams, American saxophonist and composer (died 1986)
- 1930 – Alasdair Milne, Indian-English director and producer (died 2013)
- 1930 – Faith Ringgold, American painter and activist (died 2024)
- 1930 – Toru Takemitsu, Japanese composer and theorist (died 1996)
- 1931 – Bill Brown, Scottish footballer (died 2004)
- 1932 – Ray Reardon, Welsh snooker player and police officer (died 2024)
- 1934 – Kader Asmal, South African academic and politician (died 2011)
- 1934 – Gerry Hitchens, English footballer and manager (died 1983)
- 1934 – James Holshouser, American lawyer and politician, 68th Governor of North Carolina (died 2013)
- 1935 – Albert Roux, French-English chef (died 2021)
- 1936 – Rona Barrett, American journalist and businesswoman
- 1937 – Merle Park, British ballerina and educator
- 1937 – Paul Schell, American lawyer and politician, 50th Mayor of Seattle (died 2014)
- 1938 – William Corlett, English author and playwright (died 2005)
- 1938 – Walter Gretzky, Canadian ice hockey coach and author (died 2021)
- 1938 – Bronislovas Lubys, Lithuanian businessman and politician, Prime Minister of Lithuania (died 2011)
- 1938 – Fred Stolle, Australian-American tennis player and sportscaster (died 2025)
- 1939 – Paul Hogan, Australian actor, producer, and screenwriter
- 1939 – Elvīra Ozoliņa, Latvian javelin thrower
- 1939 – Harvey Pekar, American author and critic (died 2010)
- 1939 – Lynne Stewart, American lawyer and criminal (died 2017)
- 1940 – Fred Cash, American singer
- 1941 – George Bellamy, English singer, guitarist, and producer
- 1941 – Jesse Jackson, American minister and activist (died 2026)
- 1941 – Shane Stevens, American author (died 2007)
- 1942 – Stanley Bates, English actor and screenwriter
- 1943 – Chevy Chase, American comedian, actor, and screenwriter
- 1943 – R. L. Stine, American author, screenwriter, and producer
- 1944 – Ed Kirkpatrick, American baseball player (died 2010)
- 1944 – Susan Raye, American singer
- 1946 – Hanan Ashrawi, Palestinian scholar, activist, and politician
- 1946 – Jean-Jacques Beineix, French director and producer (died 2022)
- 1946 – Dennis Kucinich, American journalist and politician, 53rd Mayor of Cleveland
- 1946 – Bel Mooney, English journalist and author
- 1946 – Jon Ekerold, South African motorcycle racer
- 1947 – Richard Morris, English archaeologist, historian, and author
- 1947 – Emiel Puttemans, Belgian runner
- 1947 – Stephen Shore, American photographer and educator
- 1947 – Bill Zorn, folk musician
- 1947 – Hansa Yogendra, Indian yoga guru
- 1948 – Benjamin Cheever, American journalist and author
- 1948 – Claude Jade, French actress (died 2006)
- 1948 – Johnny Ramone, American guitarist and songwriter (died 2004)
- 1949 – Hamish Stuart, Scottish singer-songwriter, guitarist, and producer
- 1949 – Sigourney Weaver, American actress and producer
- 1950 – Robert "Kool" Bell, American singer-songwriter and bass player
- 1950 – Blake Morrison, English poet, author, and academic
- 1951 – Jack O'Connell, American educator and politician
- 1951 – Timo Salonen, Finnish racing driver
- 1951 – Shannon C. Stimson, American philosopher, historian, and theorist
- 1951 – Adrian Palmer, 4th Baron Palmer, British aristocrat and landowner (died 2023)
- 1952 – Takis Koroneos, Greek basketball player and coach
- 1952 – Jan Marijnissen, Dutch journalist and politician
- 1952 – Edward Zwick, American director, producer, and screenwriter
- 1953 – Robert Saxton, English composer and educator
- 1954 – Michael Dudikoff, American actor
- 1954 – Huub Rothengatter, Dutch racing driver and manager
- 1955 – Bill Elliott, American race car driver
- 1955 – Alain Ferté, French racing driver
- 1955 – Darrell Hammond, American comedian and actor
- 1955 – Paul Lennon, Australian politician, 42nd Premier of Tasmania
- 1955 – Lonnie Pitchford, American singer and guitarist (died 1998)
- 1956 – Jeff Lahti, American baseball player
- 1956 – Janice E. Voss, American engineer and astronaut (died 2012)
- 1956 – Stephanie Zimbalist, American actress
- 1957 – Antonio Cabrini, Italian footballer and manager
- 1958 – Steve Coll, American journalist and author
- 1958 – Bret Lott, American journalist, author, and academic
- 1958 – Ruffin McNeill, American football player and coach
- 1958 – Ursula von der Leyen, Belgian-German physician and politician, Defense Minister of Germany, President of the European Commission
- 1959 – Gavin Friday, Irish singer-songwriter, actor, and producer
- 1959 – Erik Gundersen, Danish motorcycle racer
- 1959 – Peter Horrocks, English journalist and producer
- 1959 – Mike Morgan, American baseball player and coach
- 1959 – Carlos I. Noriega, Peruvian-American colonel and astronaut
- 1960 – Andrea Anastasi, Italian volleyball player and coach
- 1960 – Bryndís Hlöðversdóttir, Icelandic politician
- 1960 – Reed Hastings, American businessman, co-founded Netflix
- 1960 – Rano Karno, Indonesian actor and politician
- 1960 – Ralf Minge, German footballer and manager
- 1960 – François Pérusse, Canadian singer-songwriter and comedian
- 1960 – Mike Teague, English rugby player
- 1961 – Jon Stevens, New Zealand-Australian singer-songwriter
- 1961 – Simon Burke, Australian actor and producer
- 1961 – Kim Wayans, American actress and comedian
- 1962 – Bruno Thiry, Belgian racing driver
- 1962 – Chen Xiaoxia, Chinese diver
- 1964 – Jakob Arjouni, German author (died 2013)
- 1964 – CeCe Winans, American singer-songwriter
- 1965 – Matt Biondi, American swimmer and coach
- 1965 – Ardal O'Hanlon, Irish comedian, actor, and screenwriter
- 1965 – Harri Koskela, Finnish wrestler
- 1965 – C. J. Ramone, American singer-songwriter and bass player
- 1966 – Art Barr, American wrestler (died 1994)
- 1966 – Karyn Parsons, American actress and producer
- 1966 – Teddy Riley, American singer-songwriter and producer
- 1968 – Zvonimir Boban, Croatian footballer and sportscaster
- 1968 – Emily Procter, American actress
- 1970 – Mathieu Ngudjolo Chui, Congolese colonel
- 1970 – Matt Damon, American actor, producer, and screenwriter
- 1970 – Anne-Marie Duff, English actress
- 1970 – Sadiq Khan, English lawyer and politician, Minister of State for Transport, Mayor of London
- 1970 – Tetsuya Nomura, Japanese video game designer and director
- 1971 – Marc Ellis, New Zealand rugby player and television host
- 1971 – David Gauke, English lawyer and politician
- 1971 – Pınar Selek, Turkish sociologist, author, and academic
- 1971 – Monty Williams, American basketball player and coach
- 1972 – Terry Balsamo, American guitarist and songwriter
- 1972 – Stanislav Varga, Slovak footballer and manager
- 1973 – Jim Fairchild, American singer-songwriter and guitarist
- 1973 – Kari Korhonen, Finnish cartoonist
- 1974 – Kevyn Adams, American ice hockey player and coach
- 1974 – Fredrik Modin, Swedish ice hockey player
- 1974 – Koji Murofushi, Japanese hammer thrower
- 1976 – Karina Bacchi, Brazilian model and actress
- 1976 – Jinnih Beels, Belgian politician
- 1976 – Renate Groenewold, Dutch speed skater and cyclist
- 1977 – Anne-Caroline Chausson, French cyclist
- 1977 – Jamie Marchi, American voice actress, director, and screenwriter
- 1979 – Paul Burchill, English wrestler
- 1979 – Kristanna Loken, American actress
- 1980 – Nick Cannon, American actor, rapper, and producer
- 1980 – The Miz, American wrestler, actor, and television personality
- 1980 – J. R. Ramirez, Cuban-American actor
- 1981 – Raffi Torres, Canadian ice hockey player
- 1982 – Miloš Pavlović, Serbian racing driver
- 1982 – Annemiek van Vleuten, Dutch cyclist
- 1983 – Travis Pastrana, American motorcycle racer
- 1985 – Bruno Mars, American singer-songwriter, producer, and actor
- 1986 – Camilla Herrem, Norwegian handball player
- 1987 – Hassan Maatouk, Lebanese footballer
- 1990 – Rachel Klamer, Zimbabwean-Dutch triathlete
- 1991 – Jordan McLean, Australian rugby league player
- 1992 – Chelsea Gray, American basketball player
- 1993 – Angus T. Jones, American actor
- 1993 – Garbiñe Muguruza, Spanish tennis player
- 1993 – Molly Quinn, American actress and producer
- 1993 – Bubba Wallace, American race car driver
- 1995 – Grayson Allen, American basketball player
- 1995 – G Herbo, American rapper
- 1996 – Sara Sorribes Tormo, Spanish tennis player
- 1996 – Sara Takanashi, Japanese ski jumper
- 1996 – Timo Meier, Swiss ice hockey player
- 1997 – Bella Thorne, American actress
- 1997 – Josh Kerr, Scottish runner
- 1999 – Putthipong Assaratanakul, Thai actor and singer
- 1999 – Camila Rossi, Brazilian rhythmic gymnast
- 2002 – Brian Thomas Jr., American football player
- 2002 – Zheng Qinwen, Chinese tennis player
- 2003 – Ángela Aguilar, Mexican-American singer

== Deaths ==
=== Pre-1600 ===
- 705 – Abd al-Malik ibn Marwan, Umayyad caliph (born 646)
- 923 – Pilgrim I, archbishop of Salzburg
- 951 – Xiao Sagezhi, Chinese Khitan empress
- 976 – Helen of Zadar, queen consort of the Kingdom of Croatia
- 1281 – Princess Constance of Greater Poland (born c.1245)
- 1286 – John I, Duke of Brittany (born 1217)
- 1317 – Emperor Fushimi of Japan (born 1265)
- 1354 – Cola di Rienzo, Roman tribune (born c.1313)
- 1361 – John Beauchamp, 3rd Baron Beauchamp
- 1436 – Jacqueline, Countess of Hainaut (born 1401)
- 1469 – Filippo Lippi, artist (born 1406)
- 1559 – Marina de Guevara, Spanish nun executed by the Spanish inquisition (born 1517),
- 1594 – Ishikawa Goemon, ninja and thief of Japan (born 1558)

=== 1601–1900 ===
- 1621 – Antoine de Montchrestien, French soldier, playwright, and economist (born 1575)
- 1647 – Christen Sørensen Longomontanus, Danish astronomer and mathematician (born 1562)
- 1652 – John Greaves, English mathematician and astronomer (born 1602)
- 1656 – John George I, Elector of Saxony (born 1585)
- 1659 – Jean de Quen, French missionary, priest, and historian (born 1603)
- 1735 – Yongzheng Emperor of China (born 1678)
- 1754 – Henry Fielding, English novelist and playwright (born 1707)
- 1772 – Jean-Joseph de Mondonville, French violinist and composer (born 1711)
- 1793 – John Hancock, American merchant and politician, 1st Governor of Massachusetts (born 1737)
- 1795 – Andrew Kippis, English minister and author (born 1725)
- 1802 – Emmanuele Vitale, Maltese general and politician (born 1758)
- 1804 – Thomas Cochran, Canadian lawyer and judge (born 1777)
- 1809 – James Elphinston, Scottish orthographer, phonologist, and linguist (born 1721)
- 1821 – Juan O'Donojú, last Spanish ruler of Mexico (born 1762)
- 1834 – François-Adrien Boieldieu, French composer (born 1775)
- 1869 – Franklin Pierce, American general, lawyer, and politician, 14th President of the United States (born 1804)
- 1879 – Miguel Grau Seminario, Peruvian admiral (born 1834)
- 1886 – Austin F. Pike, American lawyer and politician (born 1819)
- 1897 – Alexei Savrasov, Russian painter and academic (born 1830)

=== 1901–present ===
- 1928 – Larry Semon, American actor, director, producer, and screenwriter (born 1889)
- 1931 – John Monash, Australian general and engineer (born 1865)
- 1936 – Premchand, Indian author and screenwriter (born 1880)
- 1936 – Ahmet Tevfik Pasha, Ottoman politician, 292nd Grand Vizier of the Ottoman Empire (born 1845)
- 1942 – Sergey Chaplygin, Russian physicist, mathematician, and engineer (born 1869)
- 1944 – Wendell Willkie, American captain, lawyer, and politician (born 1892)
- 1945 – Felix Salten, Austrian author and critic (born 1869)
- 1952 – Joe Adams, American baseball player and manager (born 1877)
- 1953 – Nigel Bruce, British actor (born 1895)
- 1953 – Kathleen Ferrier, English soprano (born 1912)
- 1955 – Iry LeJeune, American accordion player (born 1928)
- 1958 – Ran Bosilek, Bulgarian author and translator (born 1886)
- 1963 – Remedios Varo, Spanish-Mexican painter (born 1908)
- 1967 – Clement Attlee, English soldier, lawyer, and politician, Prime Minister of the United Kingdom (born 1883)
- 1970 – Jean Giono, French author and poet (born 1895)
- 1973 – Gabriel Marcel, French philosopher, playwright, and critic (born 1889)
- 1977 – Giorgos Papasideris, Greek singer-songwriter (born 1902)
- 1978 – Bertha Parker Pallan, American archaeologist (born 1907)
- 1979 – Brian Edmund Baker, English air marshal (born 1896)
- 1979 – Jayaprakash Narayan, Indian politician (born 1902)
- 1982 – Fernando Lamas, Argentinian-American actor and director (born 1916)
- 1982 – Philip Noel-Baker, English runner and politician, Secretary of State for Commonwealth Relations, Nobel Prize laureate (born 1889)
- 1983 – Joan Hackett, American actress (born 1934)
- 1985 – Malcolm Ross, American captain, physicist, and balloonist (born 1919)
- 1985 – Gordon Welchman, English-American mathematician and scholar (born 1906)
- 1987 – Konstantinos Tsatsos, Greek scholar and politician, 2nd President of Greece (born 1899)
- 1992 – Willy Brandt, German lawyer and politician, 4th Chancellor of Germany, Nobel Prize laureate (born 1913)
- 1992 – Robert Berdella, American serial killer, torturer, and rapist (born 1949)
- 2000 – Charlotte Lamb, English author (born 1937)
- 2001 – Dmitry Polyansky, First Deputy Premier of the Soviet Union (born 1917)
- 2002 – Phyllis Calvert, English actress (born 1915)
- 2002 – Jacques Richard, Canadian ice hockey player (born 1952)
- 2006 – Mark Porter, New Zealand racing driver (born 1974)
- 2007 – Constantine Andreou, Greek painter and sculptor (born 1917)
- 2008 – Ângelo Carvalho, Portuguese footballer (born 1925)
- 2008 – Bob Friend, English journalist (born 1938)
- 2008 – Eileen Herlie, Scottish-American actress (born 1918)
- 2008 – George Emil Palade, Romanian-American biologist and physician, Nobel Prize laureate (born 1912)
- 2010 – Frank Bourgholtzer, American journalist (born 1919)
- 2010 – Eileen Crofton, British physician and author (born 1919)
- 2011 – Al Davis, American football coach, general manager, and NFL team owner (born 1929)
- 2012 – Varsha Bhosle, Indian singer and journalist (born 1956)
- 2012 – Marilou Diaz-Abaya, Filipino director, producer, and screenwriter (born 1955)
- 2012 – Nawal Kishore Sharma, Indian politician, 20th Governor of Gujarat (born 1925)
- 2013 – Paul Desmarais, Canadian businessman and philanthropist (born 1927)
- 2013 – Rod Grams, American journalist and politician (born 1948)
- 2013 – Rodolphe Kasser, Swiss archaeologist and philologist (born 1927)
- 2013 – Akong Rinpoche, Tibetan-Chinese spiritual leader (born 1939)
- 2014 – Morris Lurie, Australian author and playwright (born 1938)
- 2014 – Zilpha Keatley Snyder, American author (born 1927)
- 2014 – Jeen van den Berg, Dutch speed skater (born 1928)
- 2015 – Jim Diamond, Scottish singer-songwriter (born 1951)
- 2020 – Whitey Ford, American professional baseball pitcher (born 1928)
- 2024 – Pat Fischer, American football player (born 1940)
- 2024 – Tim Johnson, American lawyer and politician (born 1946)
- 2024 – Luis Tiant, Cuban baseball player (born 1940)
- 2025 – Miguel Ángel Russo, Argentine footballer and manager (born 1956)

== Holidays and observances ==
- Christian feast day:
  - Evodus (or Yves)
  - Blessed John Adams, John Lowe, and Robert Dibdale
  - Palatias and Laurentia
  - Pelagia (Eastern Orthodox and Roman Catholic Churches)
  - Reparata
  - San Ernesto, Che Guevara as a folk saint. (Bolivian campesinos)
  - Simeon (Gospel of Luke)
  - Thaïs
  - Ugo Canefri
  - William Dwight Porter Bliss and Richard T. Ely (Episcopal Church)
  - October 8 (Eastern Orthodox liturgics)
- World Space Week (October 4–10)
- Air Force Day (India)
- Children's Day (Iran)
- Navy Day (Peru)
- International Lesbian Day
- National Fluffernutter Day
- World Octopus Day
