= October 8 (Eastern Orthodox liturgics) =

Day in the Eastern Orthodox liturgical calendar

Eastern Orthodox liturgical calendar
October 7	October 8	October 9
October 8 O.S. ≍ October 21 N.S. October 8 N.S ≍ September 25 O.S.

An Eastern Orthodox cross

October 8 in Eastern Orthodox liturgical calendars is a feast day and a day of commemoration of saints and martyrs. Although some Orthodox churches use the Revised Julian Calendar and others use the traditional Julian calendar, the fixed commemorations for their respective October 8 are broadly the same, no matter which calendar is used. (Note: Despite the dates being the same, the days to which they refer typically differ by 13 days. The notation Old Style or O.S. is sometimes used to indicate a date in the traditional Julian Calendar (the "Old Calendar"). The notation New Style or N.S. indicates a date in the Revised Julian calendar (the "New Calendar").)

== Saints ==
- Hieromartyr Artemon, a priest at Laodicea (c. 283-305) (Note: "At Laodicea, in the time of Diocletian, St. Artemon, a priest, who gained the crown of martyrdom by fire.")
- Virgin-martyr Pelagia of Antioch (303)
- Venerable Thaïs of Egypt (Taisia), repentant courtesan (4th century)
- Venerable Pelagia the Penitent, of the Mount of Olives (457) (Note: "At Jerusalem, St. Pelagia, surnamed the Penitent." She had been a type of courtesan known as a Hetaira.) (Note: Name days celebrated today include: Pelagia (Πελαγία).)

== Pre-Schism Western saints ==
- Martyrs Palatias and Laurentia, in Fermo near Ancona, Italy (302) (Note: Palatias was a lady of Ancona converted to Christ by her slave Laurentia. Both were martyred in Fermo near Ancona in Italy under Diocletian.) (Note: "At Ancona, Saints Palatias and Laurentia, who were sent into exile in the persecution of Diocletian, under the governor Dion, and sank under the weight of toil and misery.")
- Saint Keyne (Keyna, Keyne, Ceinwen), hermitess of Cornwall (5th century) (Note: Born in Wales, she lived as an anchoress in Cornwall. Some say that Keynsham in Somerset was named after her. A church in Cornwall is dedicated to her.) (Note: "ST. KEYNA was one of the daughters of Brechan of Brecknock, who, like so many others of her holy family, forsook the world for a life of religious retirement. The place chosen for her seclusion was on the banks of the Avon, in Somerset, and is now called by her name, Keynsham. But after spending a length of time there she returned to Wales, where her admirable holiness gained universal veneration, and merited for her the distinguished appellation of the Virgin. It was in her own country that she gave up her soul to God, and there a number of ancient churches were dedicated in her honour.")
- Saint Evodus, Bishop of Rouen in France (5th century) (Note: "At Rouen, St. Evodius, bishop and confessor.")
- Saint Benedicta, a virgin-martyr in Laon in France. (Note: "In the diocese of Laon, St. Benedicta, virgin and martyr.")
- Saint Gratus, Bishop of Châlons-sur-Saône in France (c. 652)
- Saint Badilo, a monk at Vézelay Abbey in France, he became Abbot of Leuze in Hainault in Belgium (c. 870)
- Saint Peter of Seville, a martyr venerated in Seville in Spain.
- Saint Amor of Aquitaine, hermit, rebuilder of Munsterbilzen Abbey (9th century)
- Saint Triduana (Tredwall, Trallen), nun of Restalrig, Scotland (4th century or 8th century) (Note: "A virgin connected with St Regulus in Scotland. Her shrine was a centre of devotion and pilgrimage.)
- St. Iwig (Iwi, Ywi) Hierodeacon of Lindisfarne (c. 690) (Note: A monk at Lindisfarne in England, he was ordained deacon by St Cuthbert. His relics were later translated to Wilton near Salisbury.) (Note: "ST. YWY belonged to a British family, but whether he was a native of Great Britain or of Brittany is uncertain. His early years were devoted to piety and study, and when his parents, who were persons of position in the world, wished him to take up the profession of arms, to put an end to their ambitious views he, without their knowledge, received some of the inferior orders of the Church. When his father and mother were dead, he forsook all, and retired to Lindisfarne to become the disciple of St. Cuthbert. In due time he was ordained deacon by that great Saint, and, it is supposed, professed the monastic life. His sanctity, and the gift of miracles with which he was favoured; attracted the admiration of many, and the French account of his life says that in order to escape this he fled to Brittany, and there died a holy death. After a considerable length of time, his relics were translated, and found a resting-place in the Abbey of Wilton, where they were venerated with great devotion.")

== Post-Schism Orthodox saints ==
- Saint Anthony of Novgorod, Archbishop of Novgorod (1232)
- Venerable Dositheus of Verkhneostrov in Pskov (1482)
- Saint Tryphon of Vyatka, Archimandrite (1612)
- New Monk-martyr Ignatius of Bulgaria and Mount Athos, at Constantinople (1814)

=== New Martys and Confessors ===
- Monk-martyr Varlaam (Efimov) (end of 1930)
- New Hieromartyrs (1937):

- Demetrius (Dobroserdov), Archbishop of Mozhaisk; (Note: See: (in Russian) Димитрий (Добросердов). Википедии. (Russian Wikipedia).)
- Ambrose (Astakhov), Archimandrite, of Aksinyino, Moscow; (Note: See: (in Russian) Амвросий (Астахов). Википедии. (Russian Wikipedia).)
- Pachomius (Turkevich), Abbot, of Moscow;
- John Khrenov, Deacon;
- Nun-martyr Tatiana (Besfamilnov);
- Martyrs Nicholas Reyin, Maria Vonukhina, and Nadezhda (Hope) Azhgerevich.

- New Hieromartyr Jonah (Lazarev), Bishop of Nevel, Pskov (1937) (Note: See: (in Russian) Иона (Лазарев). Википедии. (Russian Wikipedia).)
- New Hieromartyr Seraphim Schelokov (1937)
- New Hieromartyrs Peter Nicotin, Basil Ozeretskovsky, Paul Preobrazhensky, Peter Ozeretskovsky, Vladimir Speransky, Priests (1937)
- Martyrs Victor Frolov, John Rybin, Nicholas Kuzmin (1937)
- Virgin-martyr Elizabeth Kuranov (1937) (Note: See: (in Russian) Куранова, Елизавета Викторовна. Википедии. (Russian Wikipedia).)

== Other commemorations ==
- Translation of the relics of St. Aidan, Bishop of Lindisfarne and Enlightener of Northumbria.
- Translation of the relics of St. Ceolfrith, Abbot of Wearmouth and Jarrow.
- Synaxis of the Saints of Vyatka.

== Icon gallery ==
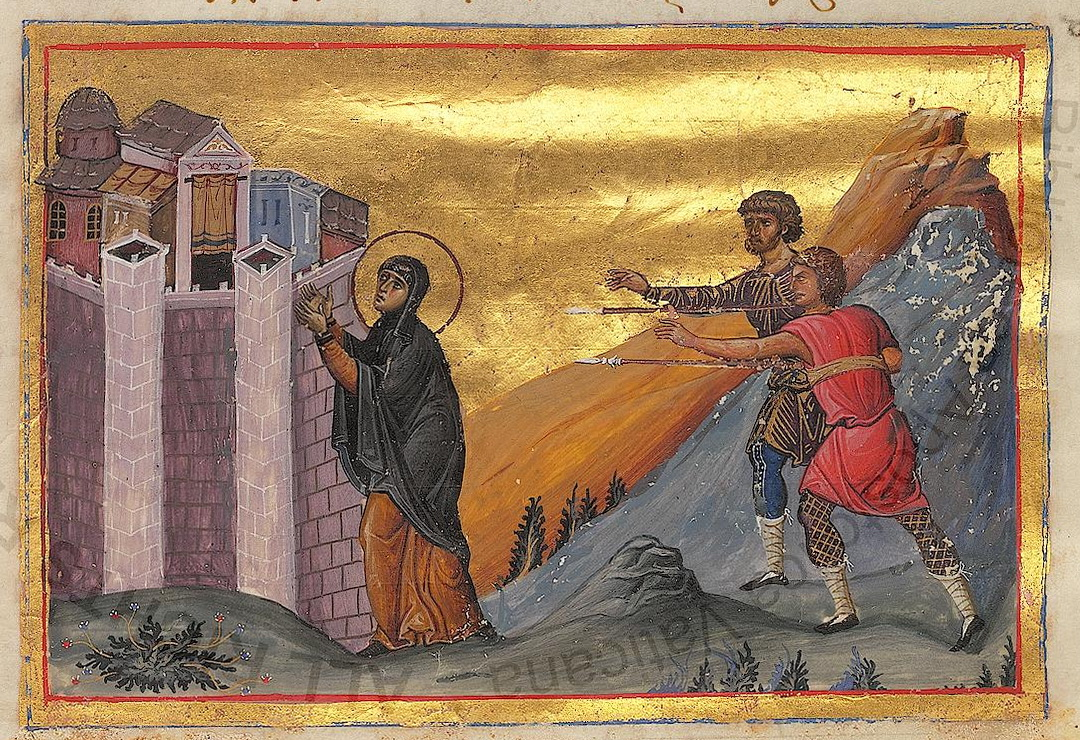
Virgin-martyr Pelagia of Antioch (303).
(Menologion of Basil II, 10th century).

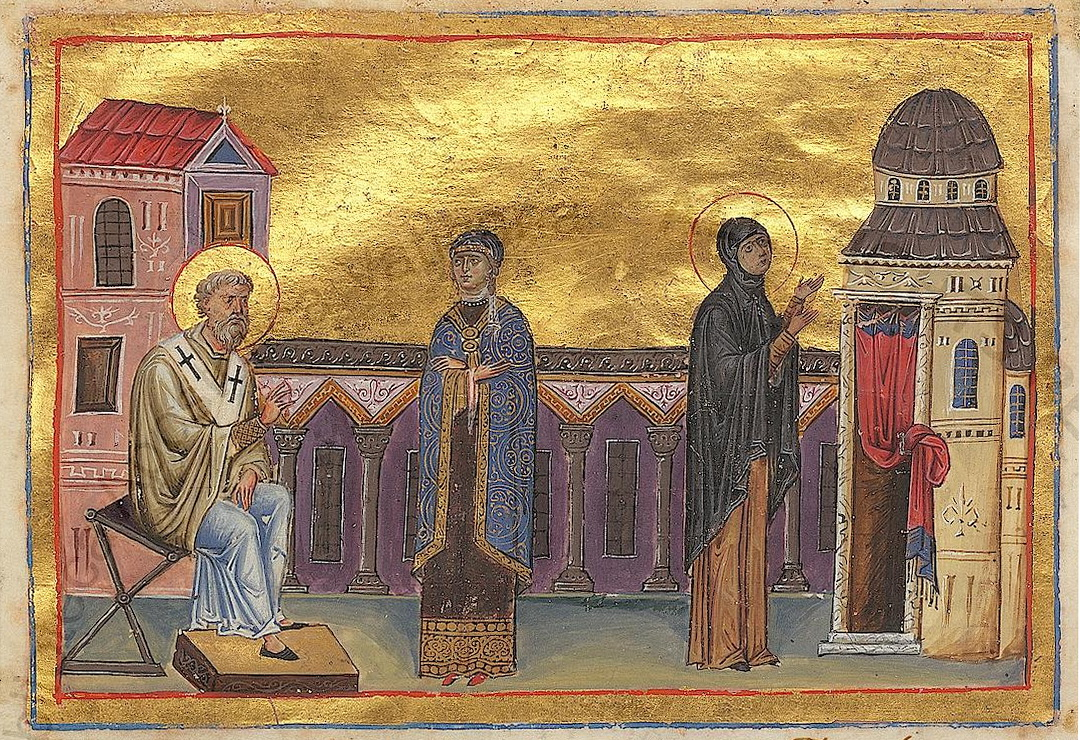
St. Pelagia the Penitent, of the Mount of Olives, with St. Nonnus of Edessa (457).
(Menologion of Basil II, 10th century).

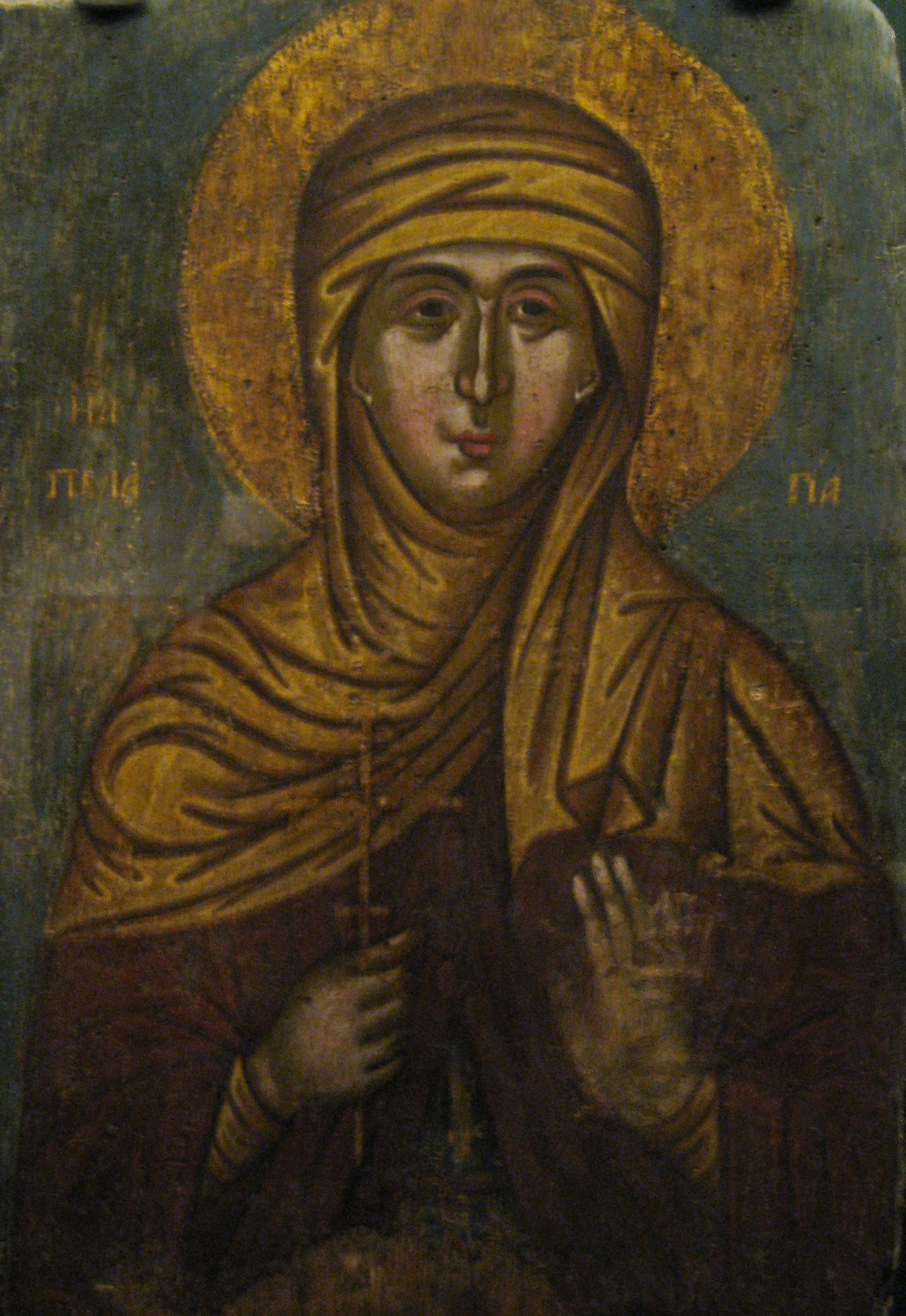
Venerable Pelagia the Penitent.

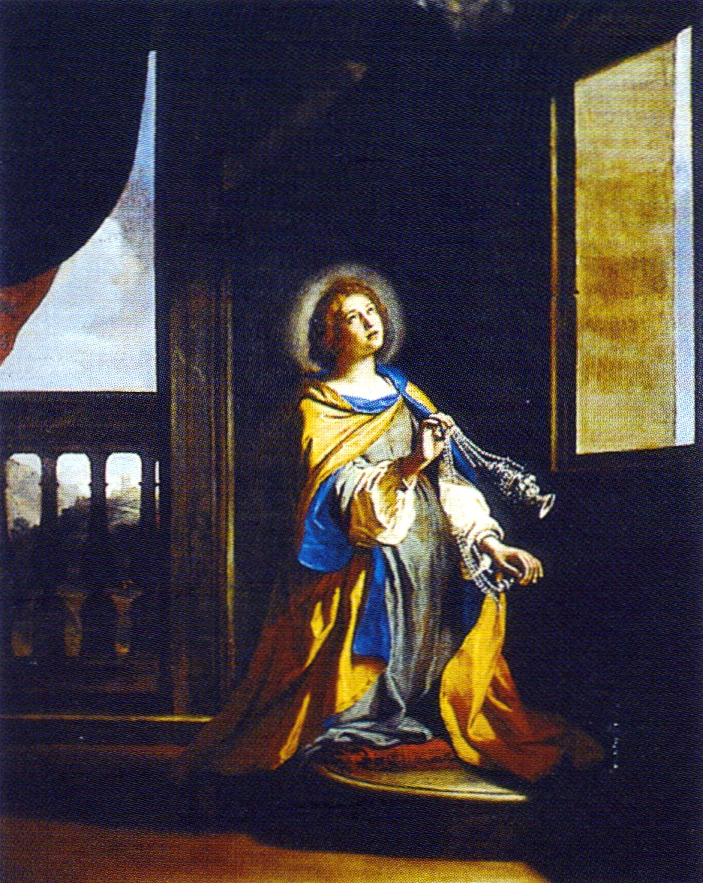
Martyr Palatias.

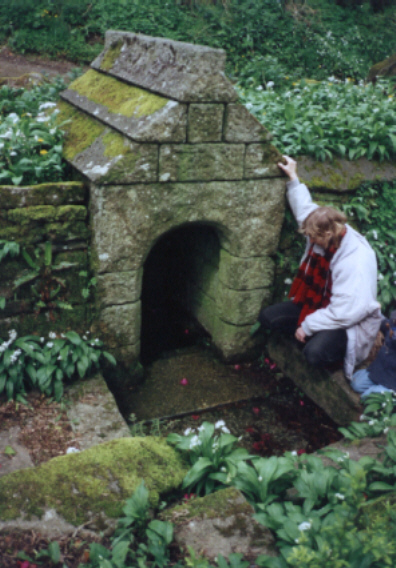
Saint Keyene's Holy Well.

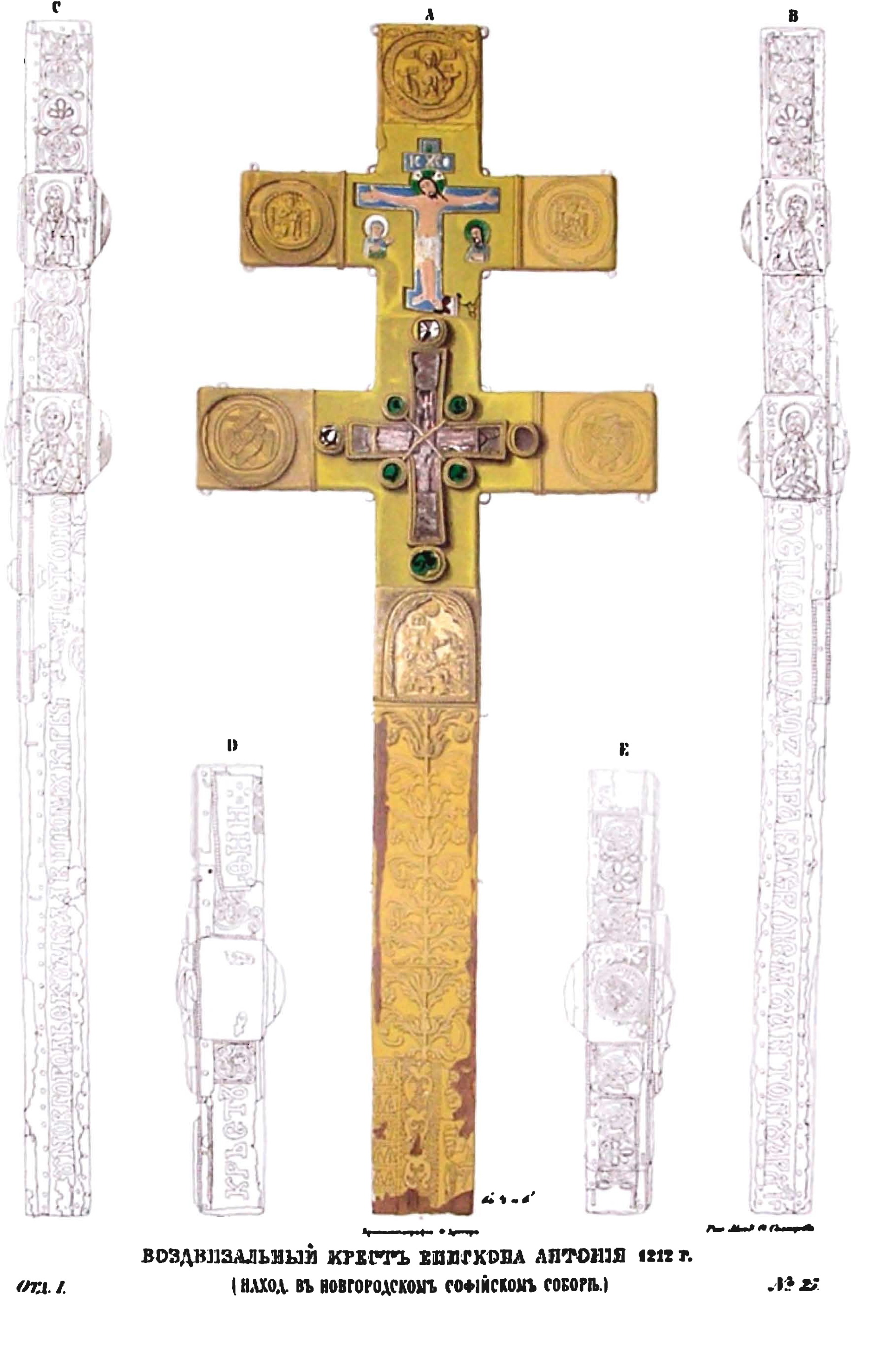
Blessing Cross of Abp. Anthony of Novgorod.

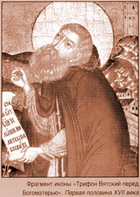
Saint Tryphon of Vyatka, Archimandrite.

New Hieromartyr Demetrius (Dobroserdov), Archbishop of Mozhaisk.

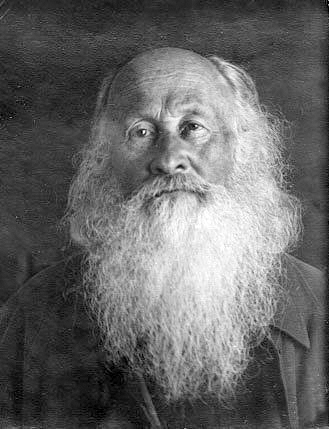
New Hieromartyr Jonah (Lazarev), Bishop of Nevel, Pskov.

Virgin-martyr Elizabeth Kuranova.

== Sources ==
- October 8/21. Orthodox Calendar (PRAVOSLAVIE.RU).
- October 21 / October 8. HOLY TRINITY RUSSIAN ORTHODOX CHURCH (A parish of the Patriarchate of Moscow).
- October 8. OCA - The Lives of the Saints.
- The Autonomous Orthodox Metropolia of Western Europe and the Americas (ROCOR). St. Hilarion Calendar of Saints for the year of our Lord 2004. St. Hilarion Press (Austin, TX). p. 75.
- The Eighth Day of the Month of October. Orthodoxy in China.
- October 8. Latin Saints of the Orthodox Patriarchate of Rome.
- The Roman Martyrology. Transl. by the Archbishop of Baltimore. Last Edition, According to the Copy Printed at Rome in 1914. Revised Edition, with the Imprimatur of His Eminence Cardinal Gibbons. Baltimore: John Murphy Company, 1916. pp. 310–311.
- Rev. Richard Stanton. A Menology of England and Wales, or, Brief Memorials of the Ancient British and English Saints Arranged According to the Calendar, Together with the Martyrs of the 16th and 17th Centuries. London: Burns & Oates, 1892. pp. 478–480.

Greek Sources

- Great Synaxaristes: (in Greek) 8 ΟΚΤΩΒΡΙΟΥ. ΜΕΓΑΣ ΣΥΝΑΞΑΡΙΣΤΗΣ.
- (in Greek) Συναξαριστής. 8 Οκτωβρίου. ECCLESIA.GR. (H ΕΚΚΛΗΣΙΑ ΤΗΣ ΕΛΛΑΔΟΣ).
- (in Greek) 08/10/2017. Ορθόδοξος Συναξαριστής.

Russian Sources

- (in Russian) 21 октября (8 октября). Православная Энциклопедия под редакцией Патриарха Московского и всея Руси Кирилла (электронная версия). (Orthodox Encyclopedia - Pravenc.ru).
- (in Russian) 8 октября по старому стилю / 21 октября по новому стилю. Русская Православная Церковь - Православный церковный календарь на 2016 год.
