= Prætextatus (bishop of Rouen) =

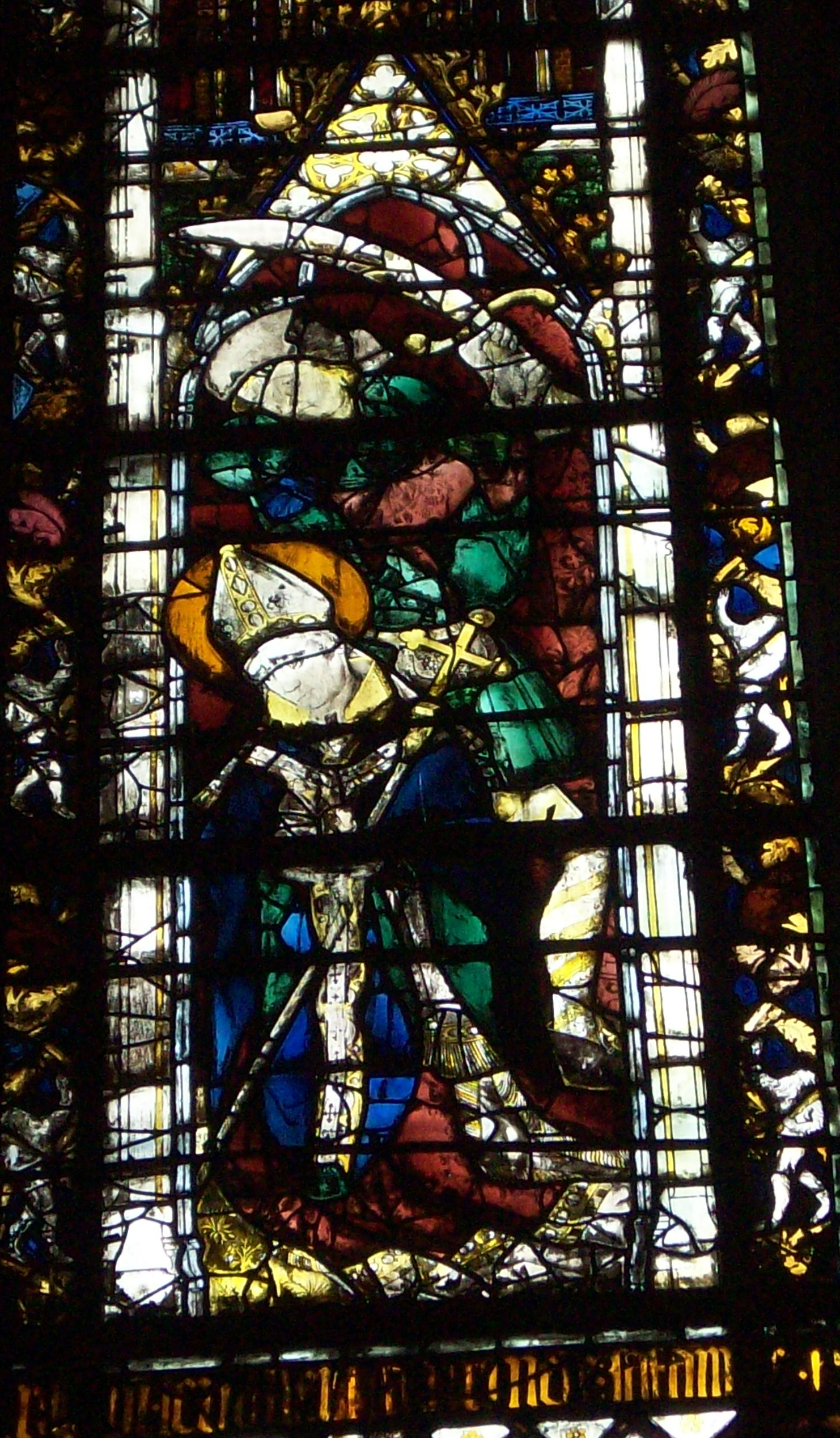
Stained glass from Rouen Cathedral depicting Saint Prætextatus

Saint Prætextatus (French: Prétextat/Prix de Rouen; died 25 February 586), also spelled Praetextatus, Pretextat(us), and known as Saint Prix, was the bishop of Rouen from 549 until his assassination in 586. He appears as a prominent character in Gregory of Tours’ Historia Francorum (History of the Franks). This is the principal source from which information on his life can be drawn. He features in many of its most notable passages, including those pertaining to his trial in Paris (in 577) and his rivalry with the Merovingian Queen Fredegund. The events of his life, as portrayed by Gregory of Tours, have been important in the development of modern understandings of various facets of Merovingian society, such as law, the rivalry between kings and bishops, church councils, and the power of queens.

== Biography ==
=== Marriage of Merovech and Brunhild, trial and exile ===
He was present at the Council of Paris 557, where marriages within certain degrees of consanguinity were declared incestuous, and at the Council of Tours (566). In 575, Prætextatus presided as minister over the wedding of Merovech of Soissons, son of King Chiperic I of Neustria, and Brunhild, the widow of King Sigebert I of Austrasia and Merovech’s own aunt, in his diocese of Rouen. King Chiperic opposed this marriage and later brought charges against Prætextatus, accusing him of bribing his people with gifts to turn them against his kingship. Prætextatus was temporarily banished and a council of bishops convened in the Church of Saint Peter the Apostle in Paris to decide his fate. At this council, which took place in 577, Chilperic accused Prætextatus of further wrongdoing, including conspiracy, contravening the canons (church law) and theft. It is heavily implied by Gregory of Tours that these accusation were false, as is noted by Edward James. Once the King had retired Gregory spoke up for the bishop, giving a long speech on the topic. Prætextatus eventually confessed to his crimes, although it is implied by Gregory that he was manipulated into doing so. Chilperic then forged canons that stipulated a bishop in Prætextatus’ position must be excommunicated. Gregory again spoke up for him, but to no avail: Prætextatus was forced into exile on the island of Jersey.

=== Return from Exile ===
Prætextatus returned from his enforced exile at the request of the people of Rouen sometime after the death of Chilperic in 584. Upon returning he went to the Burgundian King Guntram asking for an investigation into the case that had brought against him in 577. Fredegund, the now widow of Chilperic, opposed this request and argued that Praetexatus should not be awarded his old diocese on account of his having been exiled following the decision of forty-five bishops. Guntram moved to call another council to address this issue but before it could be convened Bishop Ragnemond of Paris spoke on Prætextatus’ behalf, saying that the proper course of action in his case would have been to have made him do penance, not have him exiled. As a result, Prætextatus was reinstated as bishop of Rouen.

Around this time Praetexatus made an appearance at the Council of Mâcon. At this council he read some prayers that he had composed himself while in exile, although they were received somewhat negatively. Yitzhak Hen has cited this as an example of the ‘liturgical creativity’ prevalent at the time.

=== Death ===
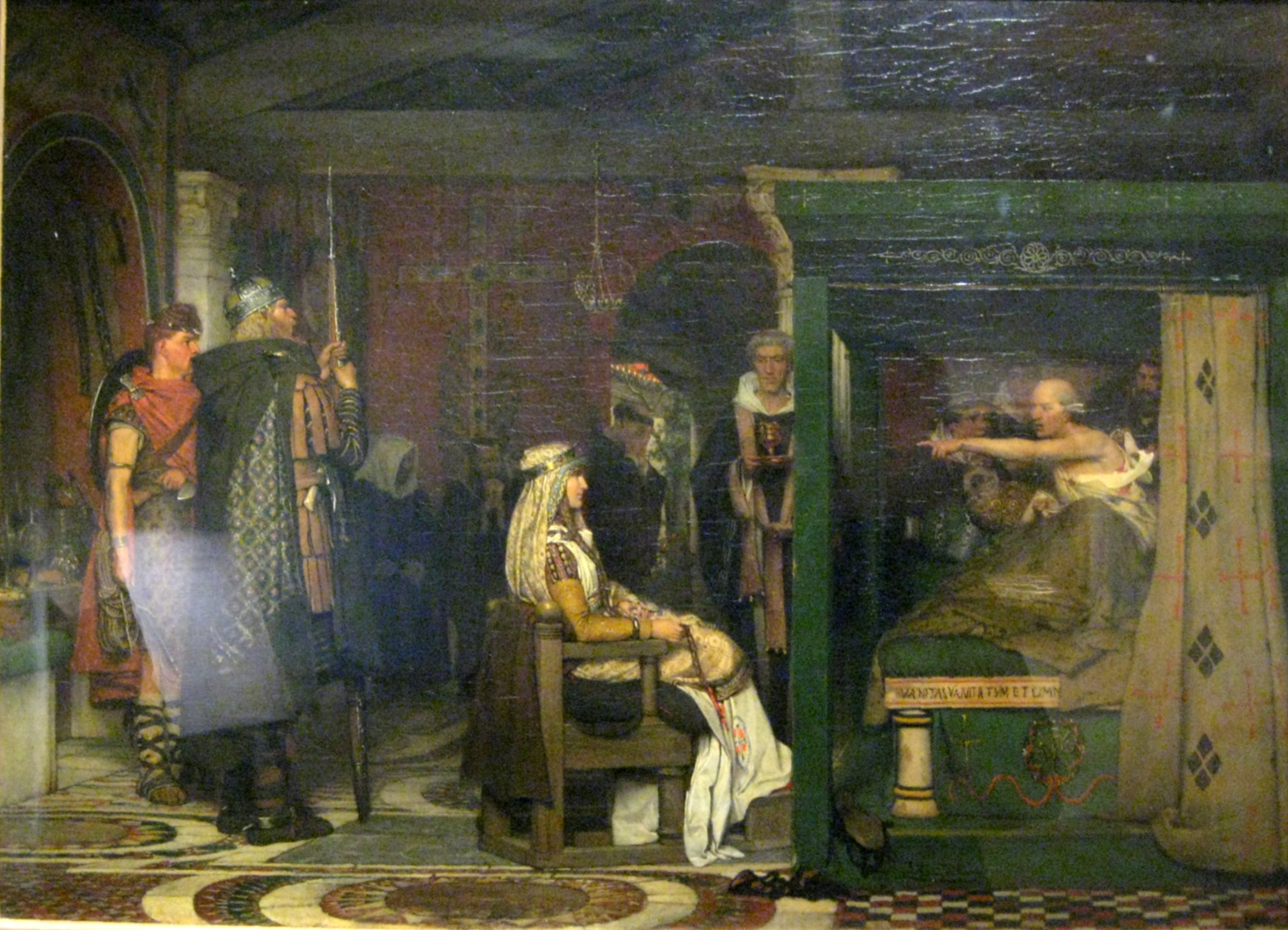
Frédégonde visite Prétextat sur son lit de mort (Fredegund visits Prætextatus on his deathbed), painting by Lawrence Alma-Tadema, of the bishop's enemy enjoying his suffering.

Praetextus was assassinated at his own church in Rouen on 24 February 586. Gregory of Tours implies strongly that this was arranged by Queen Fredegund. The assassination, he writes, occurred shortly following a "bitter exchange of words" between the two. Fredegund visited Prætextatus on his deathbed. At this meeting he accused her of having organised the whole thing. It is likely that this was a fair accusation given that Fredegund later had the man who committed the act beaten – this man subsequently implicated her in the assassination plot. It is not, however, certain that Fredegund was behind the assassination, as is exemplified by a later passage in which King Guntram refers to the event as remaining worthy of investigation.

Prætextatus’ assassin was killed, after his confession, by a man referred to as his nephew, which suggests the bishop had at least one sibling. This is the only reference to any of his family members.

Joaquin Martinez Pizarro has argued that Praextextatus’ rivalry with the ‘Jezebel-like Fredegund’ is part of a typological tradition, adhered to by Gregory of Tours, that made contemporary rivalries between bishops and rulers echo Old Testament rivalries between prophets and kings.

== Legacy ==
Prætextatus’ life is notable for various reasons. His heavy participation in a number of church councils, one of which was his own trial, mean he took part in some of the most revealing events of the Merovingian period, at least in terms of the workings of the church and its relationship with secular politics. Hen states that these councils ‘were [...] a political stage, where bishops could fight each other over power, control and prestige, and where the King and his men could settle accounts with unfaithful bishops’. She cites Prætextatus’ trial as a prime example. Moreover, Gregory Halfond has stated that at this trial, even though he is being tried for treason and stealing royal property, Prætextatus still had to be brought before an episcopal court; this highlights the power of the Merovingian church, even against aggressive kings like Chilperic.

Historians have also suggested that the trial of Prætextatus serves as a key example of Gregory of Tours’ pedagogical bent, whereby many of the events he portrays are meant to serve as instructive examples of proper church practice. Martin Heinzelmann cites Gregory's speech on Prætextatus’ behalf as the chief example of this. As such, this event in Prætextatus’ life was an important part of Gregory's literary aims.

Prætextatus has been canonized by the Roman Catholic Church.

== Notes ==
Preceded by Evodus	Bishop of Rouen; 549–586	Succeeded by Melancus
