= By Reason of Insanity =

By Reason of Insanity may refer to:

- By Reason of Insanity (TV series), a 2015 BBC documentary miniseries
- By Reason of Insanity (film), a 1982 Canadian short courtroom drama television film
- A novel
