= October 7 (Eastern Orthodox liturgics) =

Day in the Eastern Orthodox liturgical calendar

Eastern Orthodox liturgical calendar
October 6	October 7	October 8
October 7 O.S. ≍ October 20 N.S. October 7 N.S ≍ September 24 O.S.

An Eastern Orthodox cross

October 7 in Eastern Orthodox liturgical calendars is a feast day and a day of commemoration of saints and martyrs. Although some Orthodox churches use the Revised Julian Calendar and others use the traditional Julian calendar, the fixed commemorations for their respective October 7 are broadly the same, no matter which calendar is used. (Note: Despite the dates being the same, the days to which they refer typically differ by 13 days. The notation Old Style or O.S. is sometimes used to indicate a date in the traditional Julian Calendar (the "Old Calendar"). The notation New Style or N.S. indicates a date in the Revised Julian calendar (the "New Calendar").)

== Saints ==
- Hieromartyrs Julian the Presbyter, and Caesarius the Deacon, at Terracina (1st century or 268)
- Hieromartyr Eusebius the Priest and martyr Felix, at Terracina (1st century or 268)
- Saint Leontius the Governor, at Terracina (1st century or 268)
- Virgin-martyr Pelagia of Tarsus in Asia Minor (287) (see also: October 8 - Greek)
- Martyrs Sergius and Bacchus, in Syria (290-303) (Note: Name days celebrated today include: Sergios, Sergio, Serge (Σέργιος).) (Note: "In the province of the Euphrates, the holy martyrs Sergius and Bacchus, noble Romans, in the time of the emperor Maximian. Bacchus, being scourged with rough whips until his body was completely mangled, breathed his last in the confession of Christ. Sergius had his feet forced into shoes full of sharp-pointed nails, and, remaining unshaken in the faith, he was sentenced to undergo capital punishment. The place where he reposes is called after him Sergiopolis, and, on account of the signal miracles wrought in it, is honored by a great concourse of Christians.")
- Hieromartyr Polychronius, Priest, of Gamphanitus (4th century) (Note: Name days celebrated today include: Polychronis (Πολυχρόνιος); Polychronia (Πολυχρονία).) (Note: See: (in Greek) Άγιος Πολυχρόνιος. Βικιπαίδεια. (Greek Wikipedia).)
- Ten companions with Hieromartyr Polychronius (4th century):

- Saints Parmenias, Polyteleios, Elymos, Mocius, Chrysotelis, Maximus, Luke, Obadiah, Semnios and Olympiada.

== Pre-Schism Western saints ==
- Saint Justina of Padua, a virgin-martyr in Padua in Italy under Diocletian (c. 300) (Note: "At Padua, St. Justina, virgin and martyr, who was baptized by the blessed Prosdocimus, disciple of St. Peter. As she remained firm in the faith of Christ, she was put to the sword by order of the governor Maximus, and thus went to God.") (Note: "Not found in any ancient Martyrology. The Acts are a late mediaeval forgery; also the forged Acts of S. Prosdochimus, both compositions of the I2th cent.")
- Martyrs Marcellus and Apuleius, in Capua in Italy. (Note: "At Rome, the holy martyrs Marcellus and Apuleius, who at first followed Simon Magus, but seeing the wonders which the Lord performed by the Apostle Peter, abandoned Simon, and embraced the apostolical doctrine. After the death of the Apostles, under the ex-consul Aurelian, they won the crown of martyrdom, and were buried near the city.") (Note: "Marcellus and Apuleius seem to be the same as Nicetas and Aquila, mentioned in the Clementines as disciples of Simon Magus; the Martyrologies speak of them as following Simon till converted by S. Peter. On reference to the Clementine Recognitions, that most extraordinary philosophical religious romance of the 2nd century, we find that their names in Greek were Nicetas and Aquila. The inventor of the Acts of SS. Nereus and Achilles adopted their story into his composition, and crowned them with martyrdom. They are purely apocryphal personages.")
- Saint Mark, Pope of Rome (336) (Note: "At Rome, on the Ardeatine road, the demise of St. Mark, pope and confessor.")
- Saint Canog (Cynog), martyred by barbarians in Merthyr Cynog (c.492) (Note: Several churches in Wales were dedicated to him.)
- Saint Dubthach the First, Archbishop of Armagh in Ireland from 497 (513)
- Saint Palladius of Saintes, Bishop of Saintes in France (c.590)
- Saint Augustus, Abbot of Bourges in France and a friend of St Germanus of Paris (6th century) (Note: "At Bourges, St. Augustus, priest and confessor.") (Note: He is notable for discovering the relics of St Ursinus, Apostle of that region.) (Note: See: (in Italian) Augusto di San Sinforiano. Wikipedia. (Italian Wikipedia).)
- Saint Helanus, priest, in the diocese of Rheims in France (6th century) (Note: Born in Ireland, he went to France with nine other members of his family, six brothers and three sisters, and settled near Rheims. He became a priest and ministered there.)
- Martyr Osyth (Osith), Princess of Chich, England (c. 700) (Note: Osyth was a princess of the Hwiccas in the west of England. She married Sighere, King of the East Saxons. Their son, the future St Offa, became King in 683, later abdicating. Osyth founded a convent, now St Osyth, on a creek of the River Colne in Essex.)
- Saint Adalgis, Bishop of Novara in Italy (c.830-c.850) (Note: He is buried in the Church of San Gaudenzio.)

== Post-Schism Orthodox saints ==
- Venerable John the Hermit and 98 Venerable Fathers of Crete. (Note: They are referenced only by St. Nicodemus the Hagiorite. A service to them was issued in Heraklion in 1879, which says that they all reposed peacefully around the same time.)
- Venerable Sergius the Obedient of the Kiev Caves Monastery (13th century)
- Venerable Sergius of Nurma in Vologda, Abbot (1412), disciple of St. Sergius of Radonezh. (Note: See: (in Russian) Сергий Нуромский. Википедии. (Russian Wikipedia).)
- Venerable Joseph, Elder and Wonderworker, of Khevi, Georgia (1763)
- Saint Jonah of Manchuria, Bishop of Hankou, Manchuria, Wonderworker (1925)

=== New Martys and Confessors ===
- New Hieromartyr Valentine Sventsitsky, Archpriest, of Moscow (1931) (Note: See: (in Russian) Свенцицкий, Валентин Павлович. Википедии. (Russian Wikipedia).)
- New Hieromartyr Nicholas Kazansky, Priest (1942) (Note: See: (in Russian) Казанский, Николай Фёдорович. Википедии. (Russian Wikipedia).)

== Other commemorations ==
- Uncovering (1514) of the relics of St. Martinian of Byelozersk, Abbot of Kirillo-Belozersky Monastery (White Lake) (1483) (Note: See: (in Russian) Мартиниан Белозерский. Википедии. (Russian Wikipedia).)
- Icon of the Mother of God "Tenderness" of the Pskov Caves (1524) (Note: See: (in Russian) Псково-Печерская икона «Умиление». Википедии. (Russian Wikipedia).)
- Synaxis of Panagia Nafpaktiotissa (Virgin of Nafpaktos) (1571) (Note: On October 7th (or on the first Sunday after October 7th - between October 7–13), Nafpaktos celebrates the Panagia of Nafpaktos in memory of the Battle of Lepanto which took place on October 7, 1571, where the Christian European fleet decisively defeated the fleet of the Ottoman Empire.: See: (in Greek) Παναγία Ναυπακτιώτισσα. Βικιπαίδεια. (Greek Wikipedia).) (Note: In the West, she is known as the "Madonna di Lepanto" or "Santa Maria del Rozario': "THE feast of the Most Holy Rosary of the Blessed Virgin Mary, and the commemoration of Our Lady of Victory, which the sovereign Pontiff, blessed Pius V., on account of the great naval victory gained by the Christians on this day, ordered to be kept annually.")
- Uncovering of the relics (1906) of St. John Triantaphyllides, the New Chrysostom and Merciful, of Chaldia in Asia Minor (1903)

== Icon gallery ==
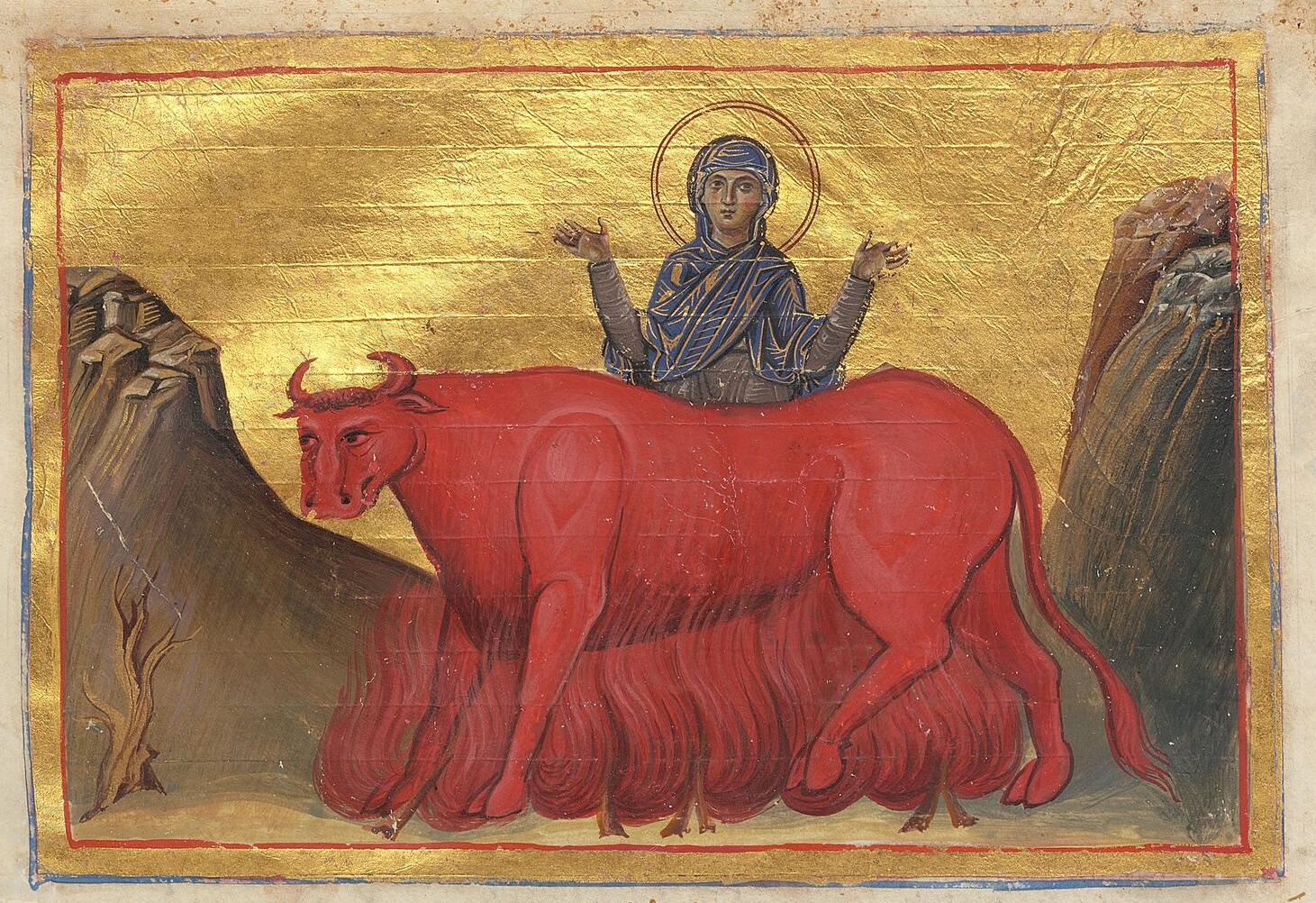
Virgin-martyr Pelagia of Tarsus.
(Menologion of Basil II, 10th century).

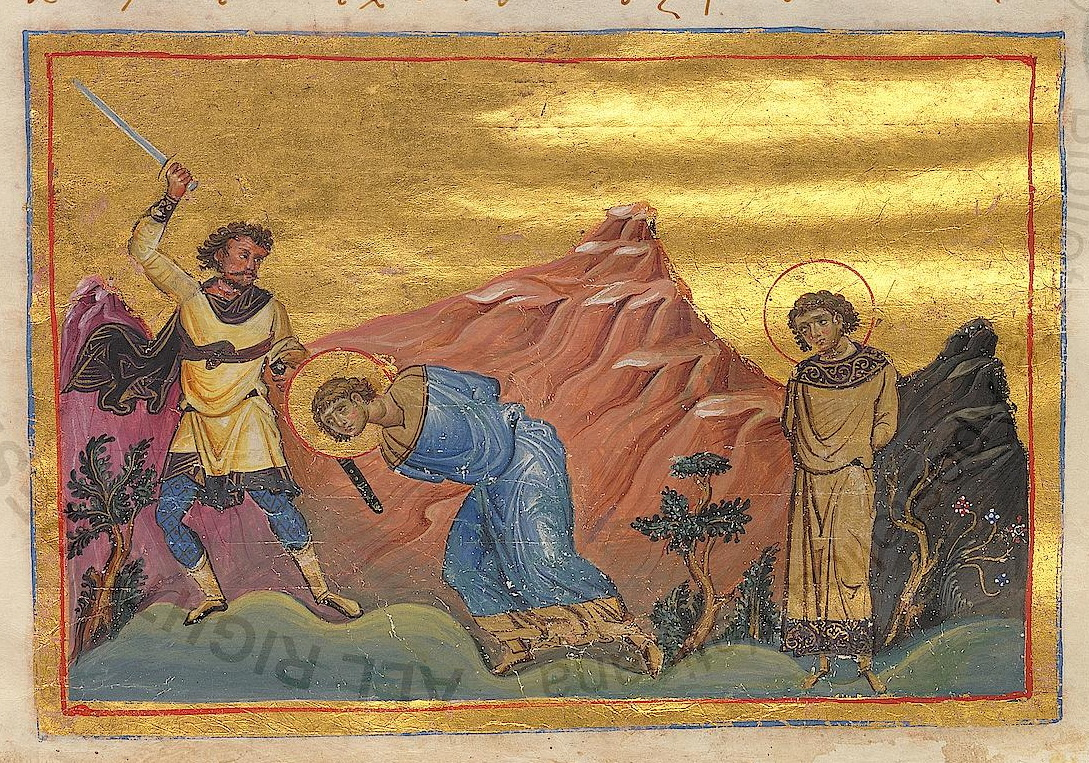
Martyrs Sergius and Bacchus.
(Menologion of Basil II, 10th century).

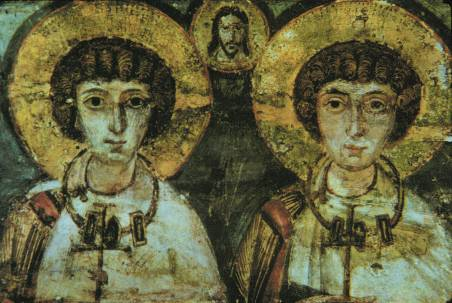
Martyrs Sergius and Bacchus.

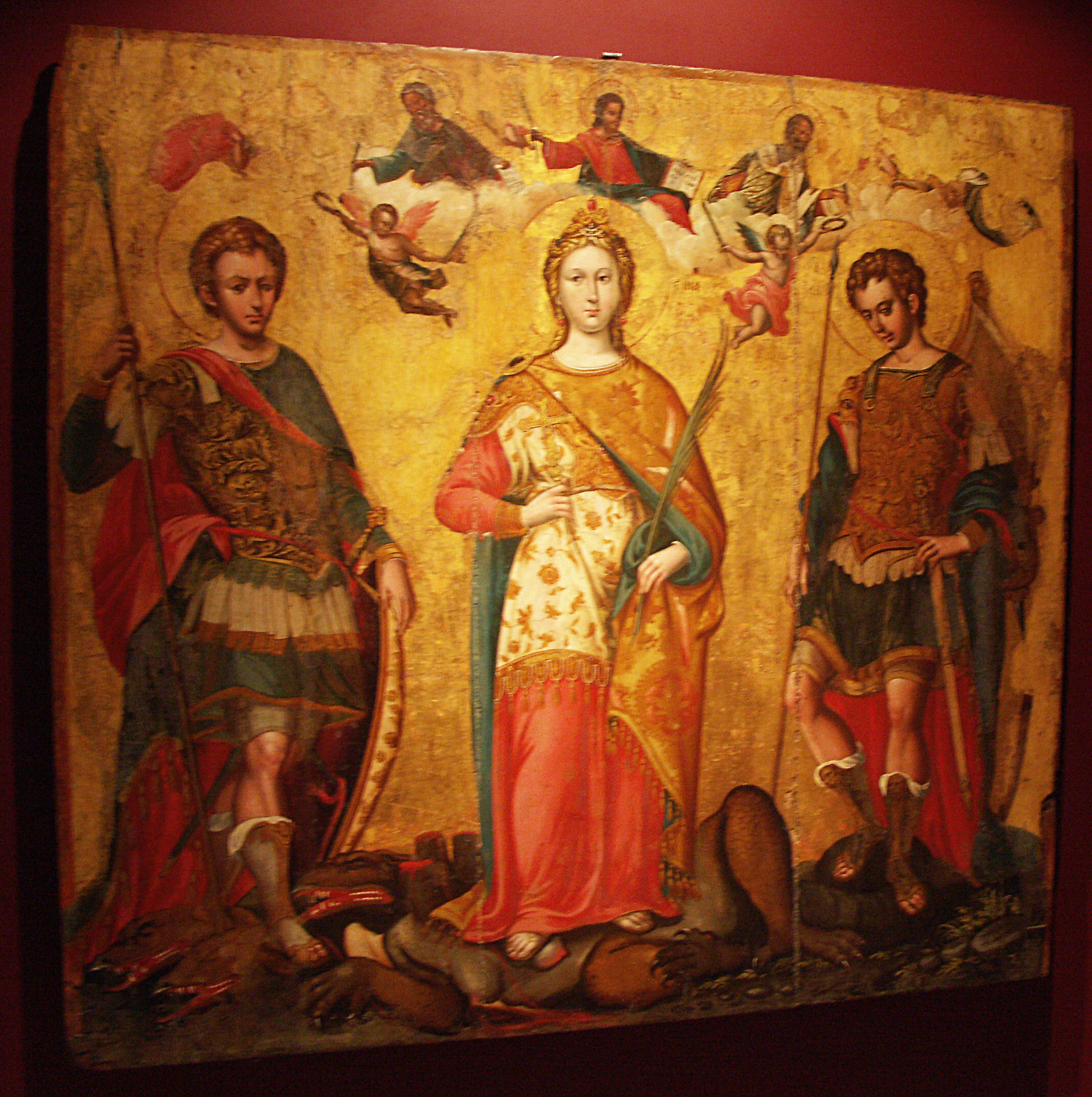
Sts.Sergius and Bacchus and Justina of Padua
(By Damaskinos, commemorating the naval victory at Lepanto, October 7, 1571.)

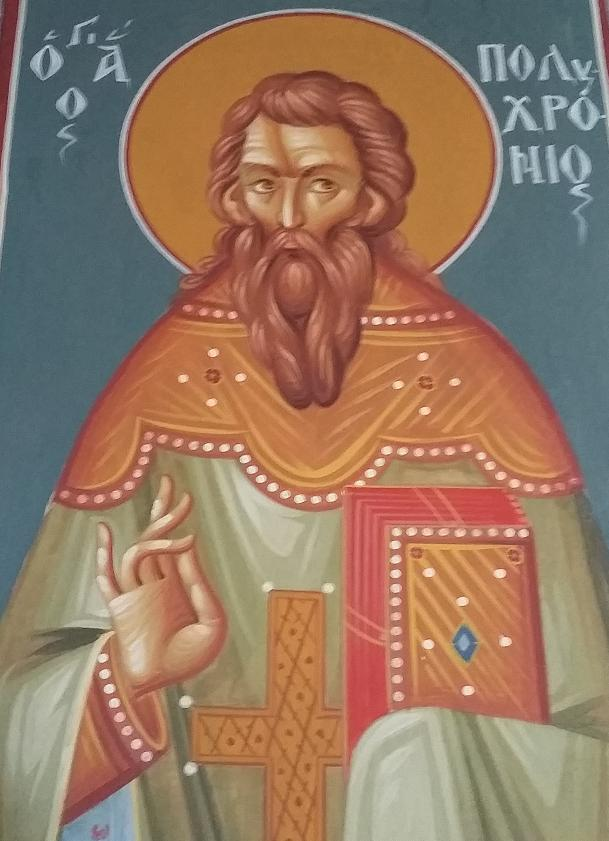
Hieromartyr Polychronius.

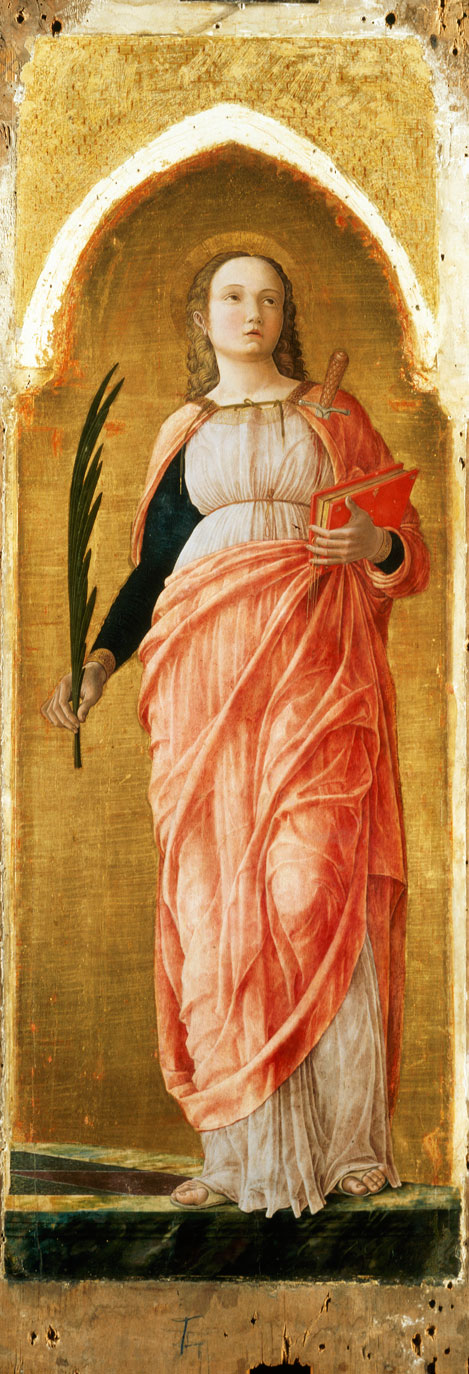
St. Justina of Padua.

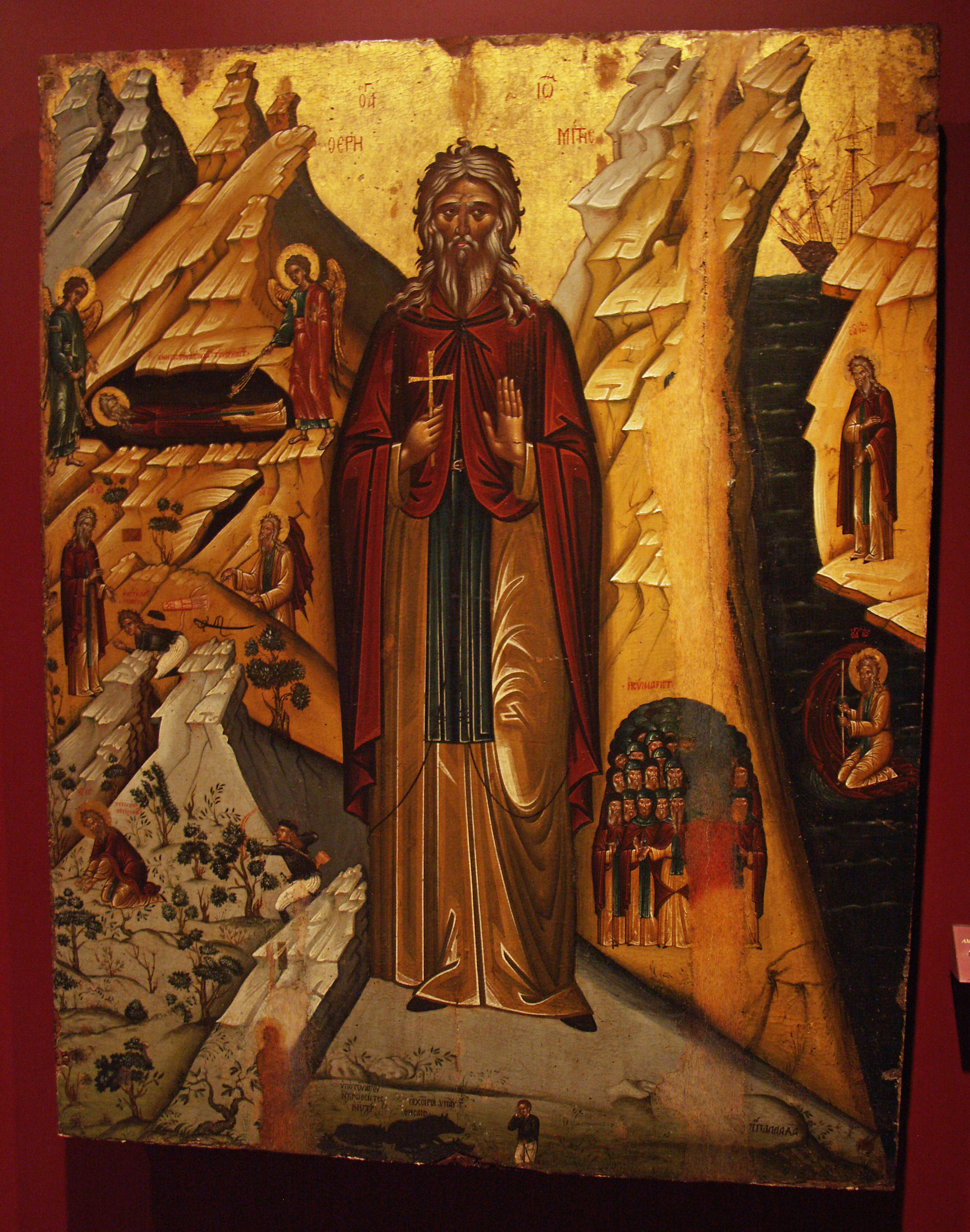
Venerable John the Hermit and 98 Venerable Fathers of Crete.

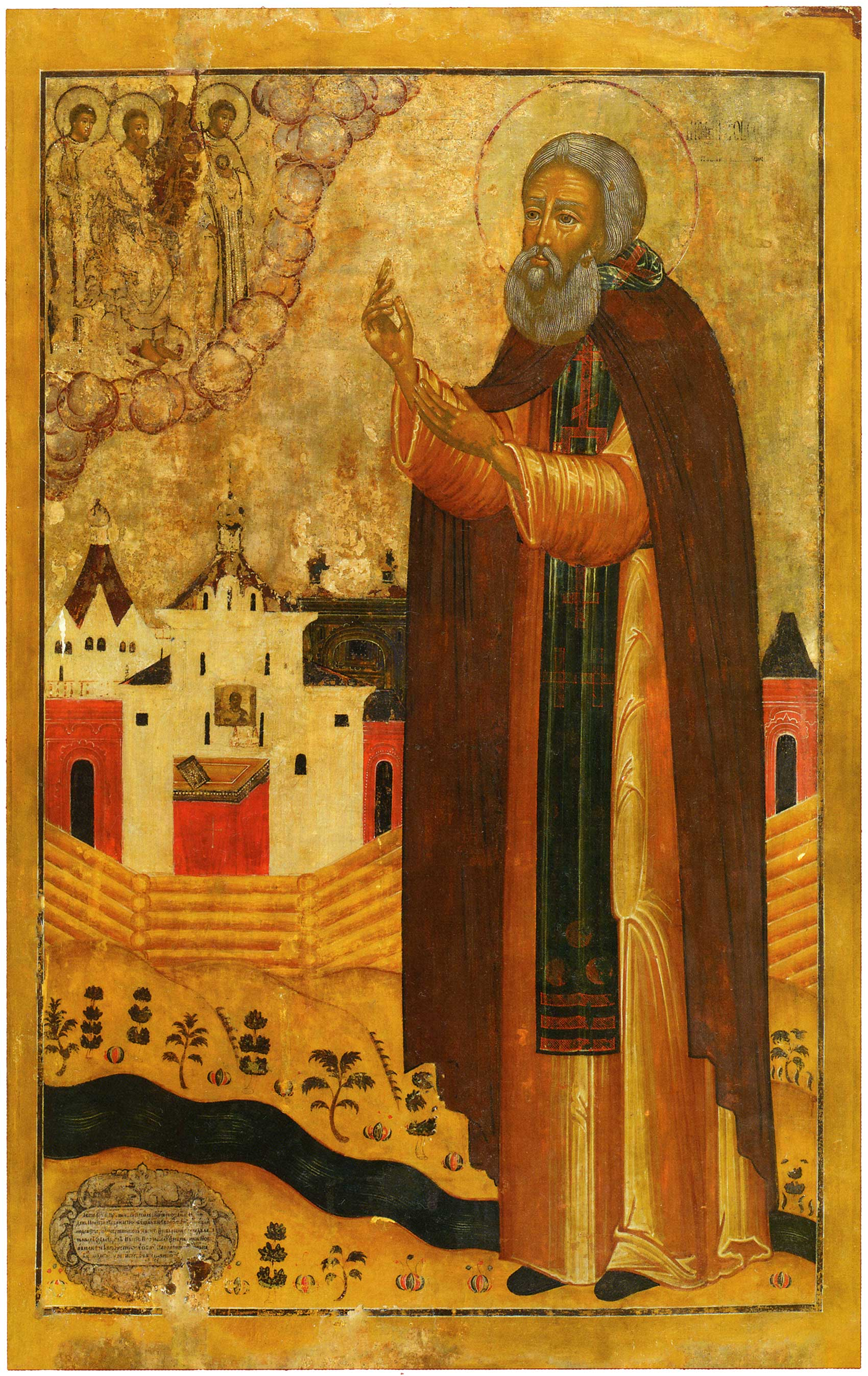
St. Sergius of Nurma in Vologda, Abbot.

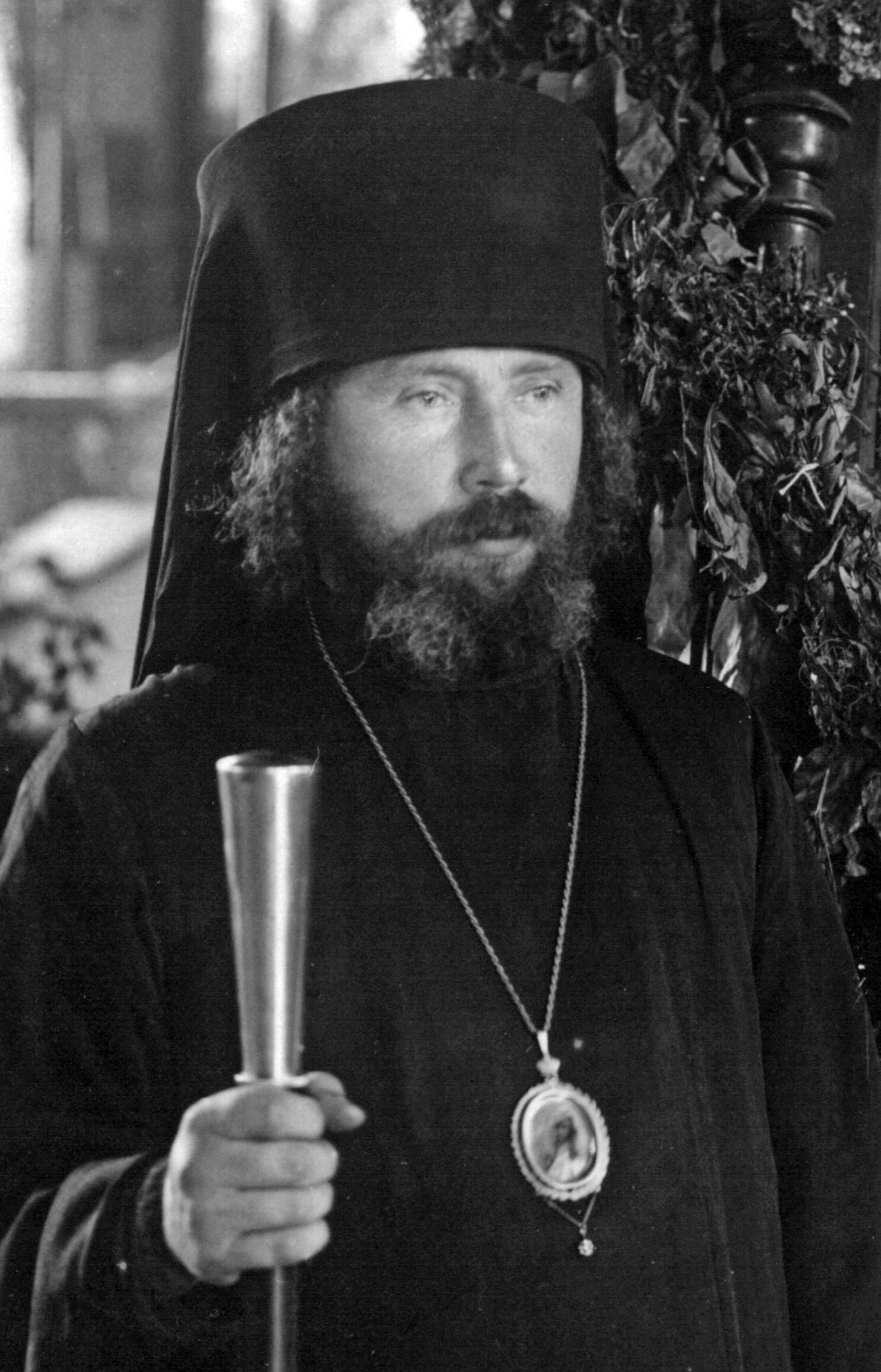
St. Jonah of Manchuria, Bishop of Hankou.

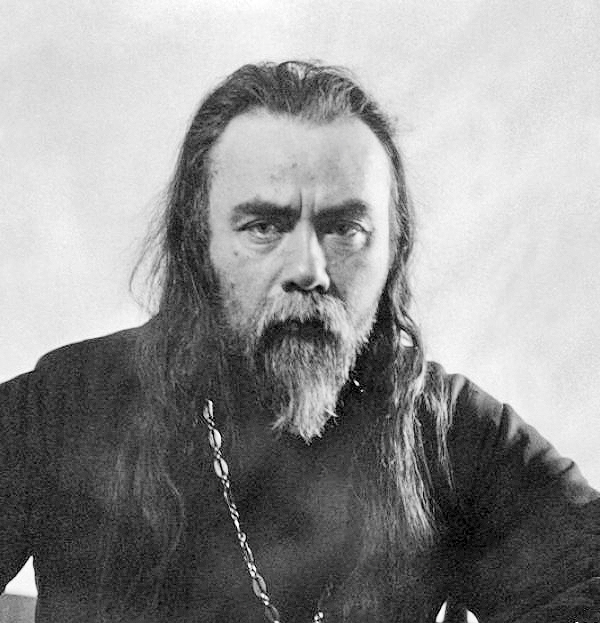
New Hieromartyr Valentine Sventsitsky.

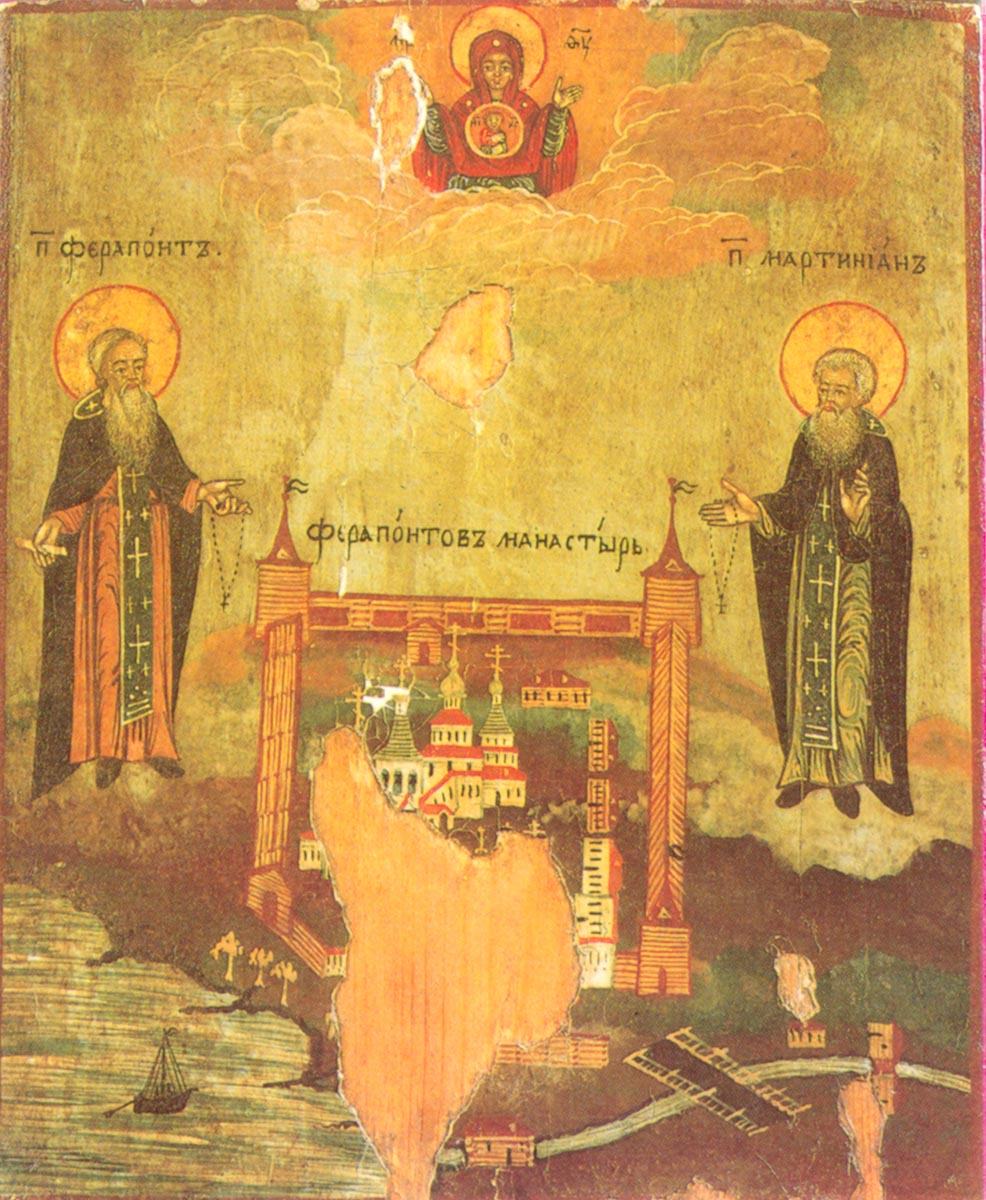
Sts. Ferapont and Martinian, of Kirillo-Belozersky Monastery.

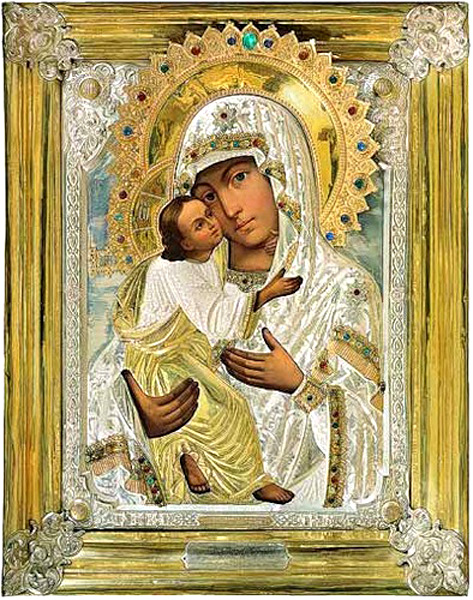
Icon of the Mother of God "Tenderness" of the Pskov Caves

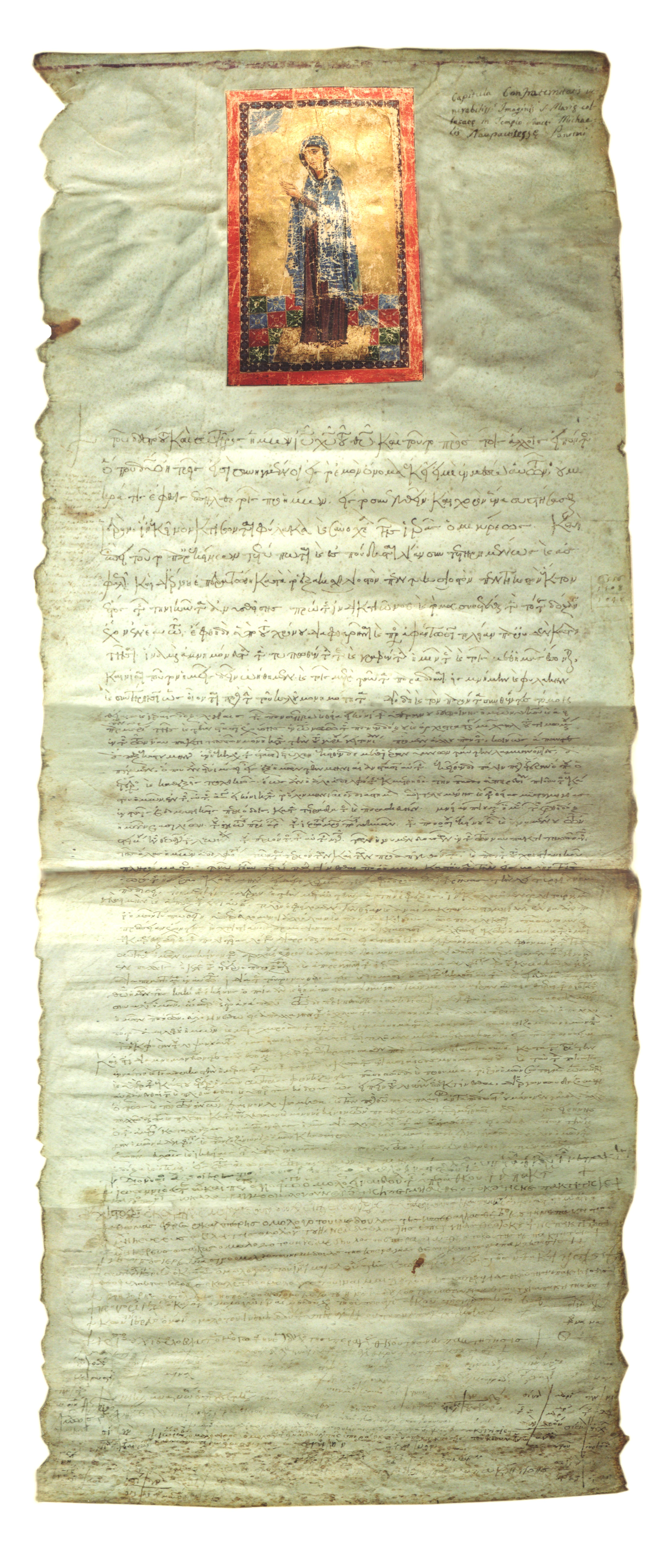
An 11th-century parchment showing the "Virgin of Nafpaktos".

== Sources ==
- October 7/20. Orthodox Calendar (PRAVOSLAVIE.RU).
- October 20 / October 7. HOLY TRINITY RUSSIAN ORTHODOX CHURCH (A parish of the Patriarchate of Moscow).
- October 7. OCA - The Lives of the Saints.
- The Autonomous Orthodox Metropolia of Western Europe and the Americas (ROCOR). St. Hilarion Calendar of Saints for the year of our Lord 2004. St. Hilarion Press (Austin, TX). pp. 74–75.
- The Seventh Day of the Month of October. Orthodoxy in China.
- October 7. Latin Saints of the Orthodox Patriarchate of Rome.
- The Roman Martyrology. Transl. by the Archbishop of Baltimore. Last Edition, According to the Copy Printed at Rome in 1914. Revised Edition, with the Imprimatur of His Eminence Cardinal Gibbons. Baltimore: John Murphy Company, 1916. pp. 309–310.
- Rev. Richard Stanton. A Menology of England and Wales, or, Brief Memorials of the Ancient British and English Saints Arranged According to the Calendar, Together with the Martyrs of the 16th and 17th Centuries. London: Burns & Oates, 1892. pp. 477–478.

Greek Sources

- Great Synaxaristes: (in Greek) 7 ΟΚΤΩΒΡΙΟΥ. ΜΕΓΑΣ ΣΥΝΑΞΑΡΙΣΤΗΣ.
- (in Greek) Συναξαριστής. 7 Οκτωβρίου. ECCLESIA.GR. (H ΕΚΚΛΗΣΙΑ ΤΗΣ ΕΛΛΑΔΟΣ).
- (in Greek) 07/10/2017. Ορθόδοξος Συναξαριστής.

Russian Sources

- (in Russian) 20 октября (7 октября). Православная Энциклопедия под редакцией Патриарха Московского и всея Руси Кирилла (электронная версия). (Orthodox Encyclopedia - Pravenc.ru).
- (in Russian) 7 октября по старому стилю / 20 октября по новому стилю. Русская Православная Церковь - Православный церковный календарь на 2016 год.
