= Shane Stevens =

Shane Stevens may refer to:

- Shane Stevens (songwriter), songwriter
- Shane Stevens (author), American author of crime novels
- Shane McMahon, who refereed WWE events under the name Shane Stevens
