= Iwig =

English saint venerated in the Middle Ages

Saint Iwig of Lindisfarne

Saint
- Born: 7th-century
- Died: Brittany
- Major shrine: Wilton Abbey
- Feast: 8 October

Iwig (alternatively Iwi, Iwigius, or Ywi of Lindisfarne) was a saint venerated in Wiltshire, England in the Middle Ages. He was reputedly a Northumbrian monk, said to have died and to have been buried in Brittany. Historian David Dumville called him "the other principal saint of Wilton", in reference to Saint Eadgyth. He was supposedly a follower (alumnus) of Saint Cuthbert.

He is listed in two 11th-century litanies. A narrative of that century claimed that his relics had been brought to Wilton Abbey by Breton monks in the 10th century, and left for safe-keeping at the altar of Saint Eadgyth. The narrative claims that the relics subsequently became immovable [through the wish of the saint to reside there], though historian John Blair suspected that this story may have been invented to justify Wilton's theft of the relics.

His feast day was celebrated on 8 October. The Priory of Ivychurch in Wiltshire is thought to have been named after him.
