= Tryphon of Vyatka =

Russian abbot and saint

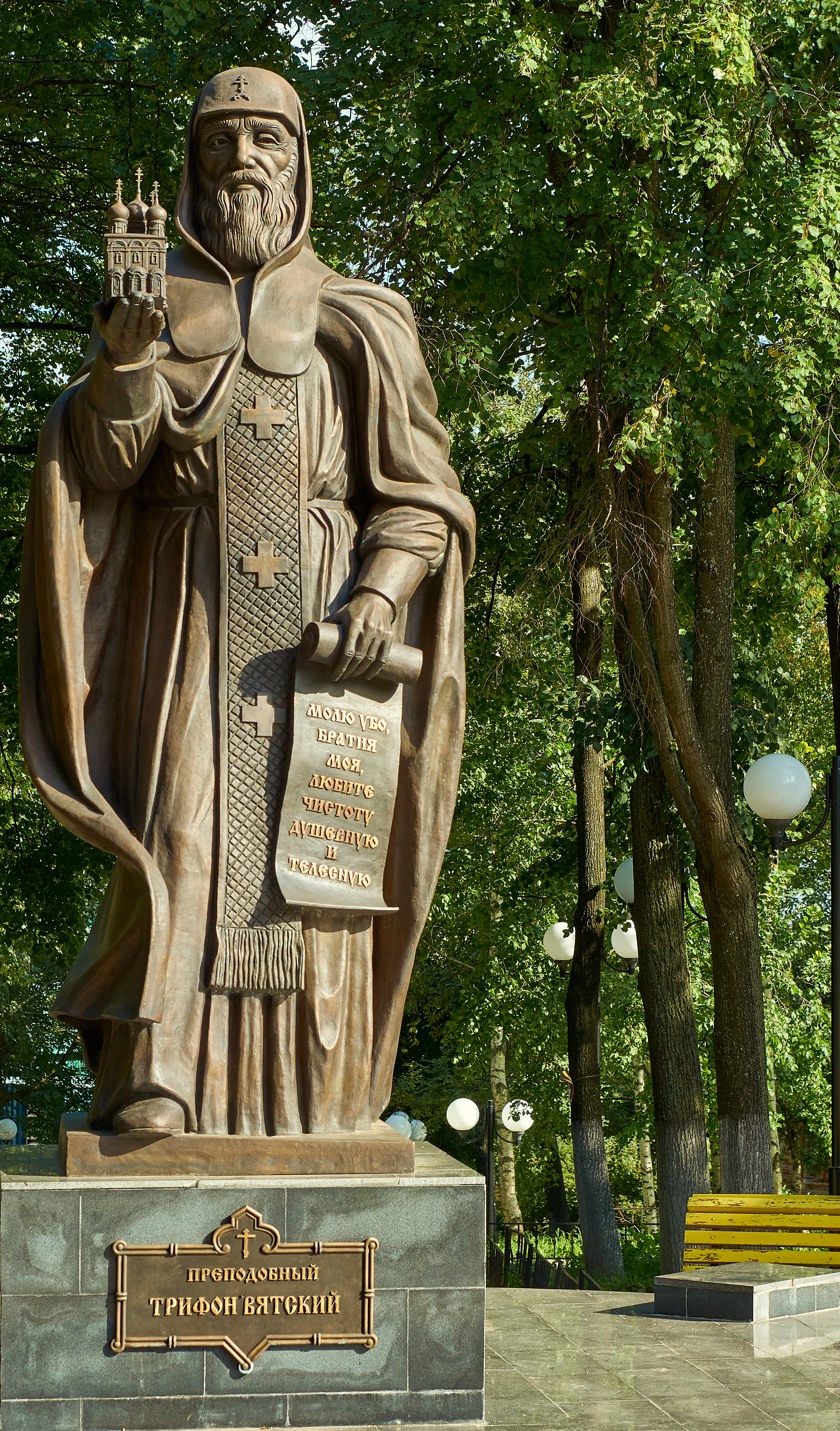

Tryphon of Vyatka (Russian: Трифин Вятский, romanized: Trifin Vyatsky; c. 1546–1612) , also known as Trofim Dmitrievich Podvizaev, was a Russian abbot and saint. He is known for evangelizing to the Ostyaks, and founded a monastery in Vyatka. He was canonized by the Russian Orthodox Church in 1903, and his feast day is celebrated on October 12.

== Biography ==
Tryphon was born in the village of Malaya Nemnyuzhka (also referred to as Malaya Nemnyuga or Malonemnyuzhskoye (Voskresenskoye)) in Pinezhsky District, which is now part of Sovpolye, Mezensky District, Arkhangelsk Oblast. At birth, he was given the name Trophimos. He was the youngest child in a well-off peasant family, raised by his parents, Dimitry and Pelagia Podvizev. After his father died early in his life, He was brought up under the guidance of his mother and older brothers.
