= Jonah of Hankou =

Saint Jonah of Manchuria
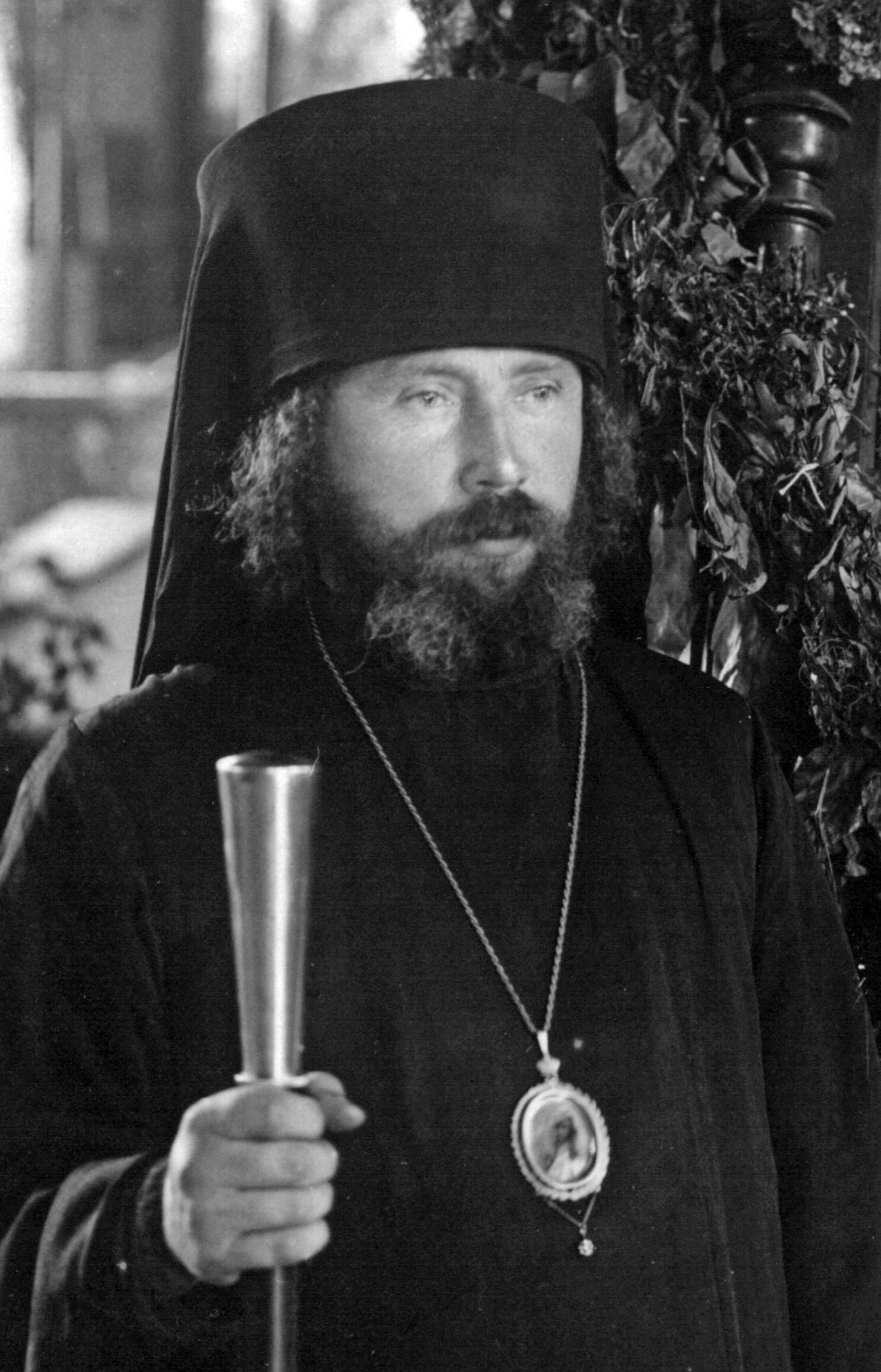
- Born: April 17, 1888; Kaluga, Russia
- Died: October 20, 1925
- Venerated in: Eastern Orthodox Church
- Canonized: October 20, 1996
- Feast: October 20 n.s. / October 7 o.s.

Bishop Jonah (Russian: Епископ Иона, secular name Vladimir Ilyich Pokrovsky, Russian: Владимир Ильич Покровский; April 17, 1888 – October 20, 1925), was a hierarch of the Russian Orthodox Church Outside of Russia (ROCOR), titular bishop of Tianjin (1922) and later of Hankou (1922-1925), vicar of Diocese of Beijing. Born and educated in Russian Empire, he served in North China and resided in city of Manzhouli, during the years immediately following the Bolshevik Revolution.

He was officially glorified by the ROCOR on October 20, 1996. The Bishop's Council of the Russian Orthodox Church canonized Jonah as Enlightener Jonah of Hankou on 3 February 2016.

== Life ==
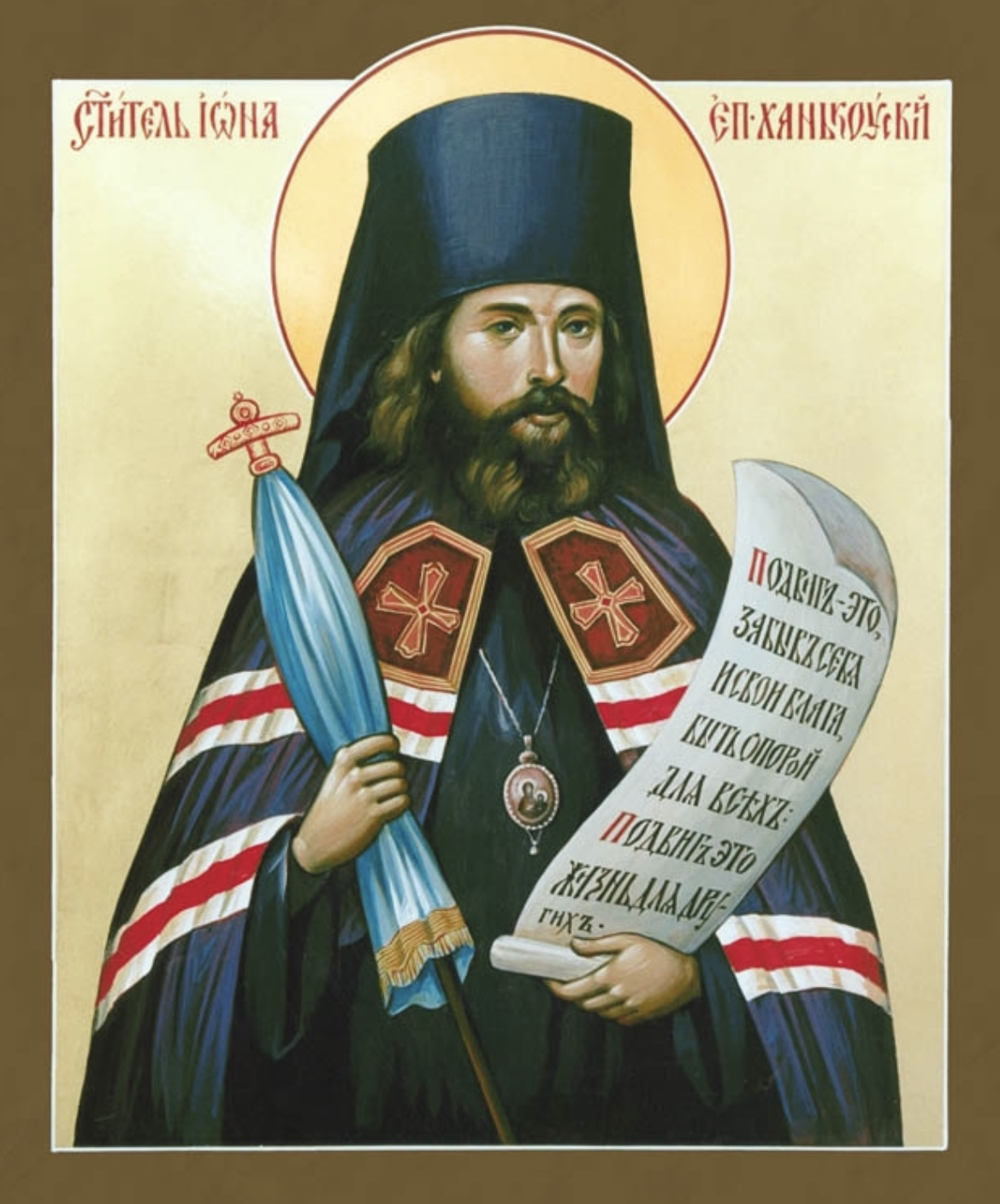
Icon of Saint Jonah of Hankou

The future St. Jonah was born in 1888 in Kaluga, Russia, with the name Vladimir Pokrovsky. He was orphaned at the age of 8 and was taken in by a deacon, who ensured he received an education. He went on to attend, graduate, and eventually teach at the Kazan Theological Academy. While attending as a student, he was tonsured a monk of the Optina Brotherhood and given the name Jonah. He took a teaching position at the academy only out of obedience to the Elder Gabriel of Optina.

In 1918 the Revolution forced the young hieromonk to leave Kazan. He was arrested by the communists and suffered beatings to the point of loss of consciousness and imprisonment. Fr. Jonah was freed by the White Army, was soon raised to the rank of igumen, and assigned as the senior priest of the southern volunteer troops. Fr. Jonah withdrew to the borders of Western China with the army of Alexander Dutov, being subjected to many hardships while crossing the Pamir cliffs, often forced to grab on to the sparse shrubbery and jagged ledges of the ice covered cliffs with wounded hands. After crossing the Gobi Desert, they finally reached Beijing, where Fr. Jonah was received into the Ecclesiastical Mission there and soon consecrated bishop of Manzhuria. (St. Jonah was officially the bishop of Hankou, in the Hubei province, but actually ministered and worked in the town of Manzhuria, the modern day border town of Manzhouli, not to be confused with the region of Manchuria, of which this town is a part.)

During his short time as bishop, St. Jonah transformed the Orthodox community in Manzhuria. He established an orphanage, a school, and a dining hall for the poor.

== Death ==
Bishop Jonah had been caring for a priest who died of typhoid fever. He subsequently contracted chronic tonsillitis and then, due to complications, developed blood poisoning. As he was dying, he wrote a final epistle to his flock, reminding them of the need to love one another, confessed one final time to Archbishop Methodius of Beijing, received Holy Communion, blessed those who were in his room, and then he put on the epitrachelion and cuffs which had belonged to Elder Ambrose of Optina and began, "loudly and with prostrations", to read the canon for the departure of the soul. Finally "overcome with weakness", he laid down on his bed and said, "God's will be done. Now I shall die," and, he indeed died within minutes.

That same evening, a ten-year-old boy named Nicholas Dergachev, who was crippled, had been suffering from an inflammation of the knee joints. All medical efforts had proven fruitless. He was unable to walk, or even to stand. The boy had a dream. "A hierarch vested in white appeared to him and said, "Here, take my legs. I don't need them anymore. And give me yours." He woke up and "was miraculously healed". From a photograph he later identified the hierarch in his dream as Bishop Jonah, who had died that same night, October 7/20, 1925."

Though his life was short, his memory endured long after his death. St. John (Maximovitch) said of St. Jonah:

"Already here in the diaspora we have righteous ones in our time. Although they are not yet glorified, people receive wondrous signs from them. For example Bishop Jonah of Manchuria." (From the book "Sermons," by St. John of Shanghai and San Francisco)

== Relics ==
There was an attempt to excavate the relics of St Jonah in July 1994 which was unsuccessful in locating the site of his grave. In 1997, new information was provided that may have located the site, but so far no second attempt has been made.

== Sources ==
- The Life of St. Jonah of Manchuria
