= Palatias and Laurentia =

Pair of Christian martyrs

Saints Palatias and Laurentia
- Died: 302; Fermo, near Ancona
- Major shrine: Ancona Cathedral
- Feast: October 8

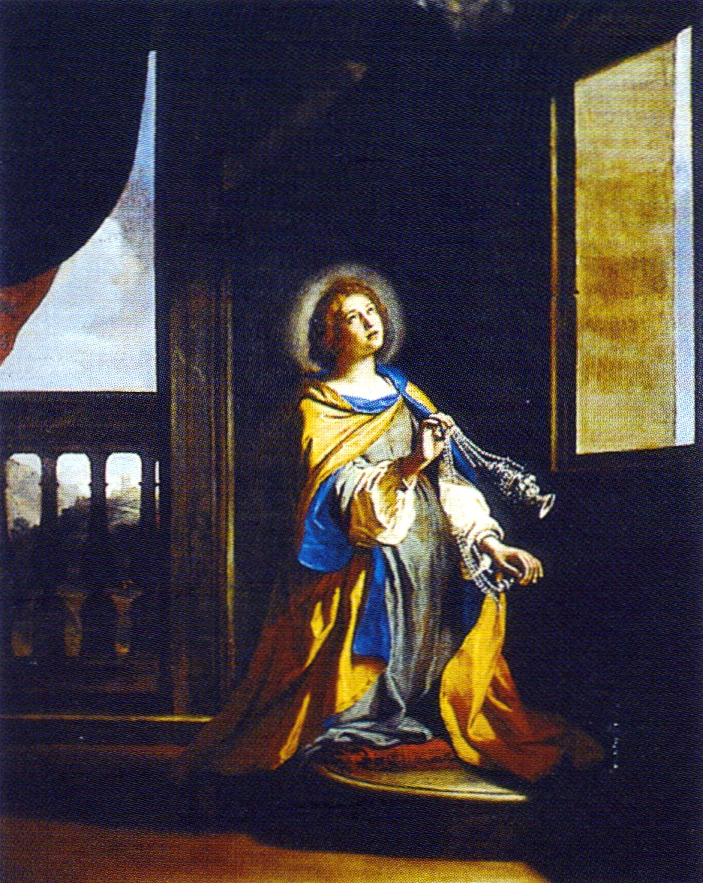
Guercino - Santa Palazia

Palatias and Laurentia (Italian: Sante Palazia e Laurenzia, Lorenza) (died 302 AD) are martyrs venerated by the Roman Catholic and Eastern Orthodox churches. According to tradition, Palatias or Palatia was an aristocratic Roman woman who was converted to Christianity by her wet nurse or slave Laurentia. They were executed for being Christians at Fermo, in present-day Italy, during the reign of Diocletian.

The account of their lives and martyrdom was preserved in an ancient manuscript from Ancona of uncertain date and another preserved by the Biblioteca Vallicelliana at Rome. The accounts contain many legendary details, containing tropes found in the vitai of other virgin saints, such as Saint Christina, Saint Barbara, and Saint Victoria.

Mario Natalucci believes that it be may possible that the two saints were natives of Ancona who were martyred during the persecutions of Diocletian, and their relics carried to that city. Their cult was diffused in the Piceno, in places such as Fermo, Osimo, and Camerino, and in Ancona the name "Palazia" appears in ancient liturgical texts and statues of her appear from the 11th century onwards.

A church and a monastery were built in their honor. Their relics were collected in one small bronze urn, of Berninian imitation, donated to Ancona Cathedral by Pope Benedict XIV, who had been bishop of that city.

Guercino's La Santa Palazia is preserved in the Pinacoteca Civica Francesco Podesti, in Ancona.
