= Shane Stevens (author) =

American novelist

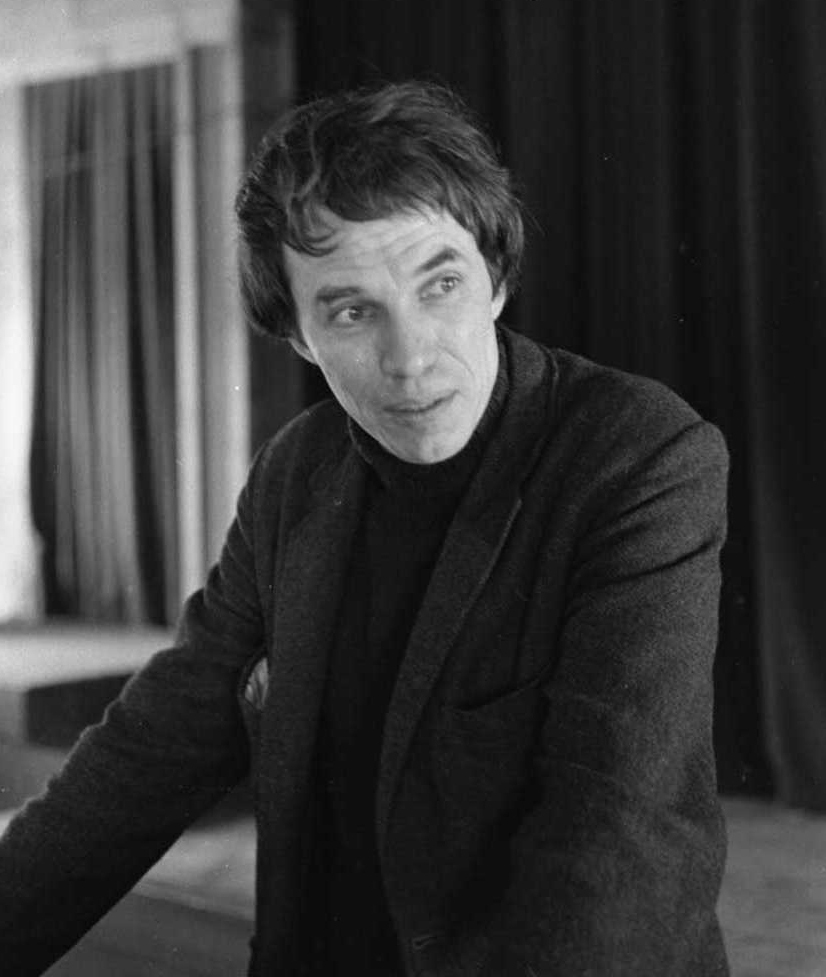
A rare photo representing Shane Stevens

Shane Craig Stevens (October 8, 1941 – 2007) was an American author of crime novels. His parents are John and Caroline (Royale) Stevens.

His novels include Go Down Dead (1966), Way Uptown in Another World (1971), Dead City (1973), Rat Pack (1974), By Reason of Insanity (1979), and The Anvil Chorus (1985). Stephen King wrote an appreciation of Stevens in the Afterword of his novel The Dark Half and paid tribute to him in that book, in which Thad Beaumont writes violent crime novels starring a character named "Alexis Machine," a reference to a character from Stevens' novel Dead City.

In Stevens' novel By Reason of Insanity the serial killer character, Thomas Bishop, believes he is the son of Caryl Chessman, who was executed in 1960 for various crimes including rape and kidnapping. The hero of his later novel The Anvil Chorus, a Paris police inspector, is an Alsatian Jew apparently related to Alfred Dreyfus.

Stevens also wrote two crime novels under the pseudonym J.W. Rider: Jersey Tomatoes (Arbor 1986) and Hot Tickets (Arbor 1987). The protagonist is Ryder Malone in both novels. The setting is New Jersey. Malone is an extremely tough private detective who specializes in cases of murder.
