= Evodus =

French Roman Catholic saint

Saint Evodius
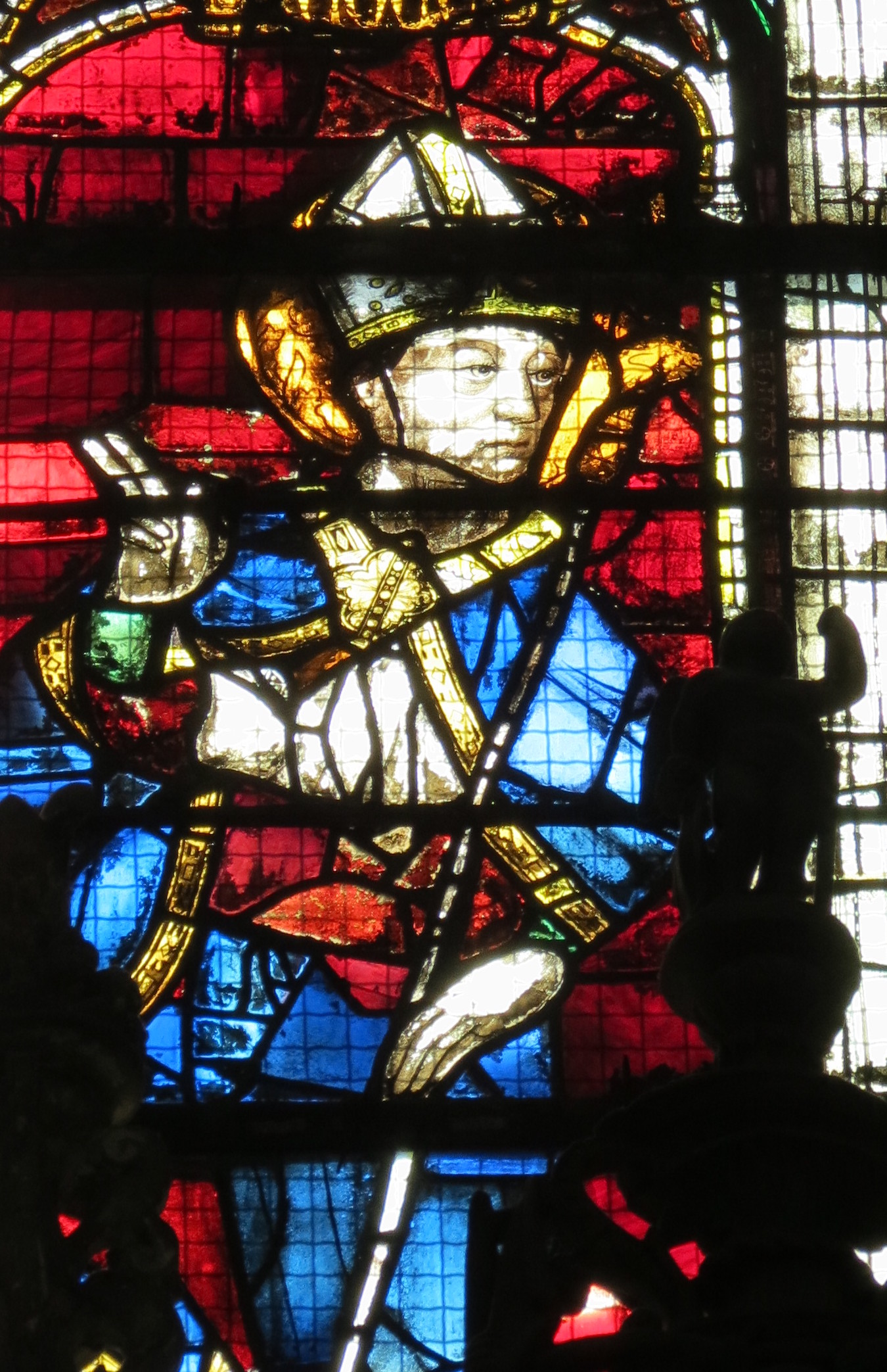
- Stained glass depiction of Saint Evodius in the Chapel of the Virgin, of the Rouen Cathedral, Normandy, France

Bishop of Rouen
- Died: 422; Andelys
- Venerated in: Roman Catholic Church
- Feast: 8 October

Yves or Evodius, Lisoie, Yvoire, or Evodius, was an early bishop of Rouen. He is considered to be a saint by the Roman Catholic Church with a feast day celebrated on 8 October.

There is a legend that relates a fire that would turn off when "wet with tears [of his] prayers." The only place in France dedicated and named after him is the Abbey Church of St. Yved in Braine, but the choir school of the Rouen Cathedral is known today as St. Evodius Choir School.

He died in 422 in Andelys, but his tomb is in the grounds of the Rouen Cathedral. To protect the relics from the Norman invasions, they were transported in the 9th century to the fort in Braine, but in the 19th century were reinterred in Rouen Cathedral under the authority of Cardinal Bonnechose, archbishop of Rouen.
