= Annunciation Church =

Annunciation Church may refer to:

== Albania ==
- Annunciation Church, Kozarë
- Annunciation Church, Mjekës
- Annunciation Monastery, Albania, in Vanistër

== Greece ==
- Our Lady of Tinos

== Malta ==
- Annunciation Church, Balzan
- Annunciation Church, Mdina
- Annunciation Church, Tarxien
- Annunciation Chapel, Victoria

== Republic of Ireland ==
- Ballaghaderreen Cathedral

== Italy ==
- Santissima Annunziata (disambiguation), various churches and basilicas

== Latvia ==
- Annunciation of Our Most Holy Lady Church, Riga

== Romania ==
- Annunciation Church, Alba Iulia
- Annunciation Church, Sibiu

== Russia ==
- Annunciation Cathedral, Voronezh
- Annunciation Church of the Alexander Nevsky Lavra, Saint Petersburg

== Ukraine ==
- Annunciation Cathedral, Kharkiv

== United Kingdom ==
- Annunciation Church, Chesterfield
- Annunciation Church, Walsall

== United States ==
- Annunciation Roman Catholic Church (Denver), Colorado
- Annunciation Church (Leadville, Colorado), in National Historic Landmark Leadville Historic District
- Annunciation Greek Orthodox Cathedral of New England, Boston, Massachusetts
- Annunciation Melkite Catholic Cathedral, Boston, Massachusetts
- Annunciation Greek Orthodox Church of Newburyport, Massachusetts
- Church of the Annunciation (Minneapolis)
- Annunciation Greek Orthodox Church (Manhattan), New York, New York
- Annunciation Church (historic) (Cleveland, Ohio)
- Annunciation Church (Houston), Texas
- Annunciation Greek Orthodox Cathedral (Houston), Texas
- Annunciation Greek Orthodox Church, Wauwatosa, Wisconsin

== See also ==
- Church of the Annunciation (disambiguation)
- Annunciation Cathedral (disambiguation)
