= Church of the Annunciation =

Church of the Annunciation usually refers to three churches in Nazareth:

- Basilica of the Annunciation
- Greek Orthodox Church of the Annunciation
- Greek Catholic Church of the Annunciation

It may also refer to:

== Australia ==
- Anglican Church of the Annunciation, Broome

== Germany ==
- Carmelite Monastery Church of the Annunciation, Hirschhorn, Hesse

== Greece ==
- Metropolitan Cathedral of Athens

== Hungary ==
- Church of the Annunciation (Mohács)
- See the disambiguation page of churches of the Annunciation in the Hungarian Wikipedia

== Malta ==
- Chapel of the Annunciation, Ħal-Millieri

== Ireland ==
- Church of the Annunciation, in Fingal South West deanery, Fingal, Dublin 11 (1967–2018, demolished 2021)

== Italy ==
- Church of the Annunciation (Alcamo)

== Jerusalem ==
- Cathedral of the Annunciation, Jerusalem

== Russia ==
- Cathedral of the Annunciation, Moscow

== Slovenia ==
- Franciscan Church of the Annunciation, in Ljubljana

== Sudan ==
- Greek Orthodox Church of the Annunciation, Khartoum

== United Kingdom ==
- Church of the Annunciation, Bournemouth
- Church of the Annunciation, Brighton
- Church of the Annunciation, Marble Arch, London
- Greek Orthodox Church of the Annunciation, Manchester
- Church of the Annunciation to the Blessed Virgin Mary, Souldern

== United States ==
- Church of the Annunciation (Minneapolis)
- Church of the Annunciation (Shelbyville, Kentucky)
- Hellenic Orthodox Church of the Annunciation, Buffalo, New York
- Church of the Annunciation, Cincinnati, Ohio

== See also ==
- Annunciation Church (disambiguation)
- Annunciation Cathedral (disambiguation)
