= Greek Church =

Greek Church may refer to

- Eastern Orthodox Church
- Church of Greece
- Greek Orthodox Church
- Greek Catholic Church
- Greek Church (bowling term), the name of particular spare shot in bowling
- Greek Church (Alba Iulia), Romania
- Greek Church, Brăila, Romania
- Greek Church (Brașov), Romania
- Greek Church (Constanța), Romania
