= Our Lady of the Annunciation Church =

Our Lady of the Annunciation Church may refer to:

- Our Lady of the Annunciation Church, Amman, Jordan
- Our Lady of the Annunciation Church, Jersey, St. Martin, Channel Islands
- Our Lady of the Annunciation Church, King's Lynn, United Kingdom
- Our Lady of the Annunciation Church, Liverpool, United Kingdom

== See also ==
- Annunciation of Our Most Holy Lady Church, Riga, Latvia
- Church of the Annunciation of Our Lady of the Newarke, Leicester, United Kingdom
- Cathedral of Our Lady of the Annunciation, Jerusalem
- Cathedral of the Annunciation of Our Lady, Sydney, Australia
- Our Lady of the Annunciation Cathedral (Catarman), Northern Samar, Philippines
- Monastery of our Lady of the Annunciation of Clear Creek, Oklahoma
- Our Lady of the Annunciation Chapel at Annunciation Priory, Bismarck, North Dakota
- Annunciation Church (disambiguation)
