= Greek religion =

Greek religion can refer to several things, including

- Ancient Greek religion
  - Greek hero cult
  - Greco-Roman mysteries
  - Hellenistic religion
  - Platonic idealism
- Greek Church (disambiguation)
  - Greek Orthodox Church
  - Greek Catholic Church
- Religion in Greece
- Hellenism (modern religion)

== See also ==
- Hellenism (disambiguation)
