= Synagogue Church (Nazareth) =

Christian Church in Nazareth, Israel

Coordinates: 32°42′12″N 35°17′48″E

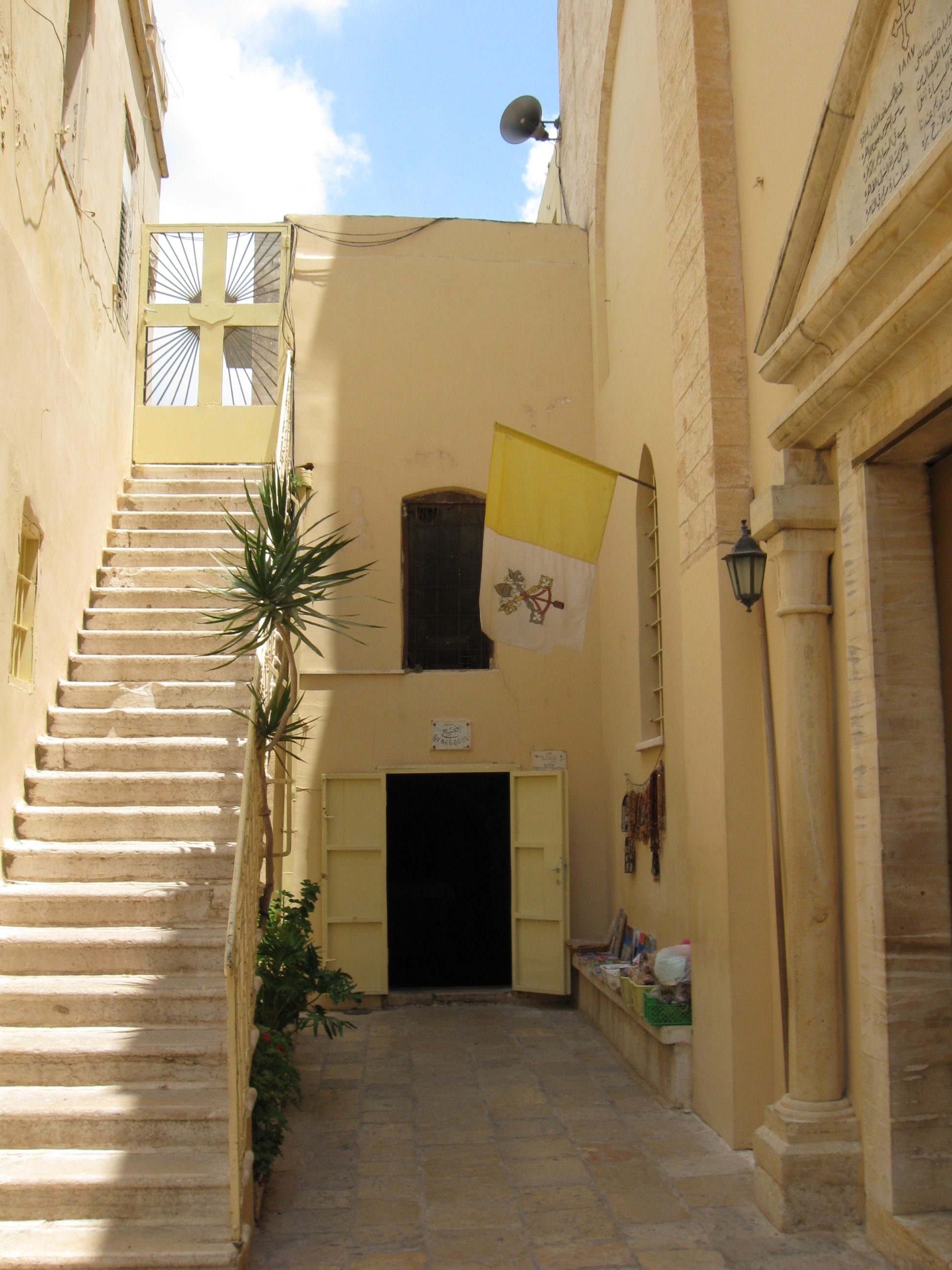
Entrance

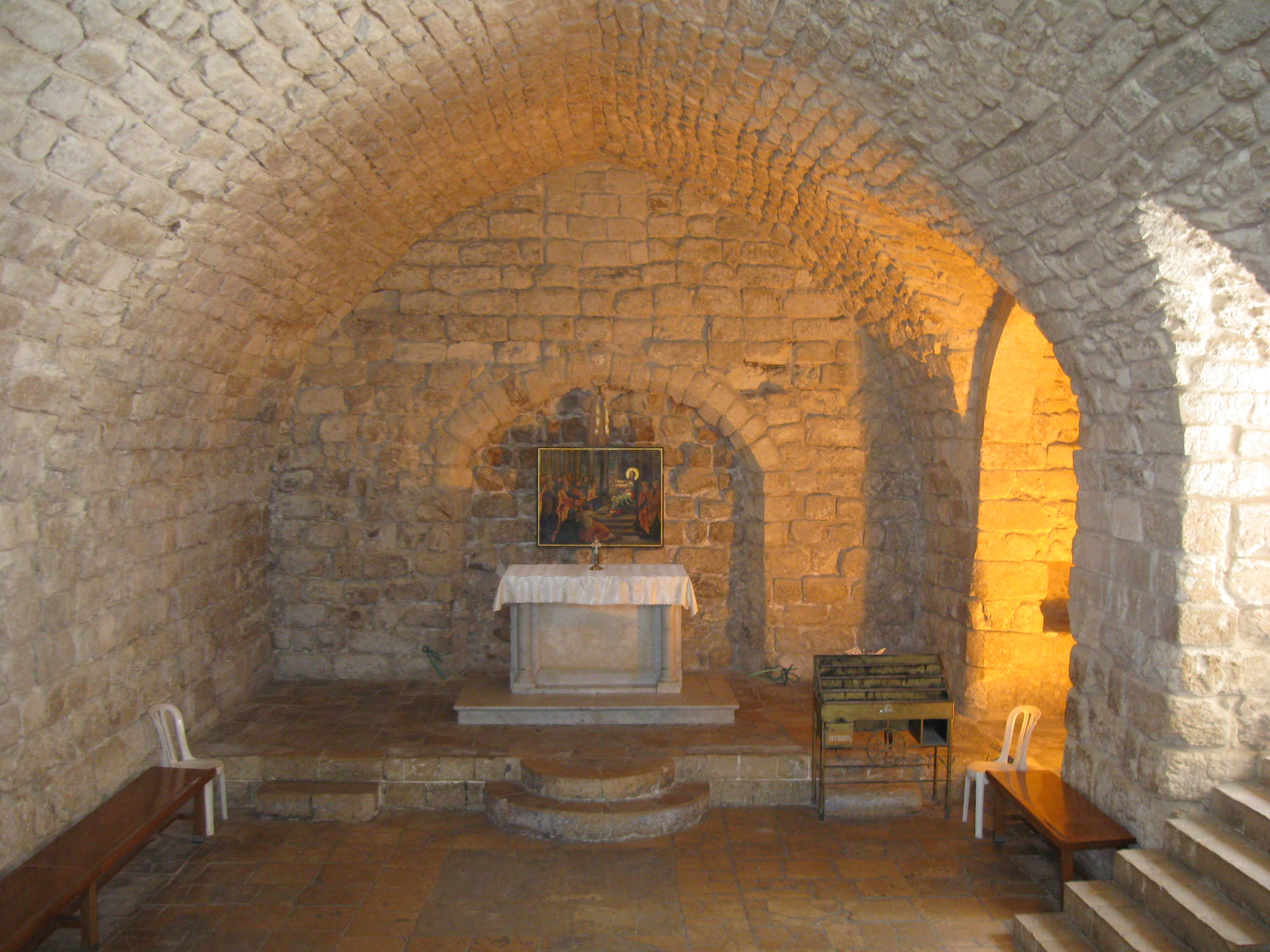
Interior

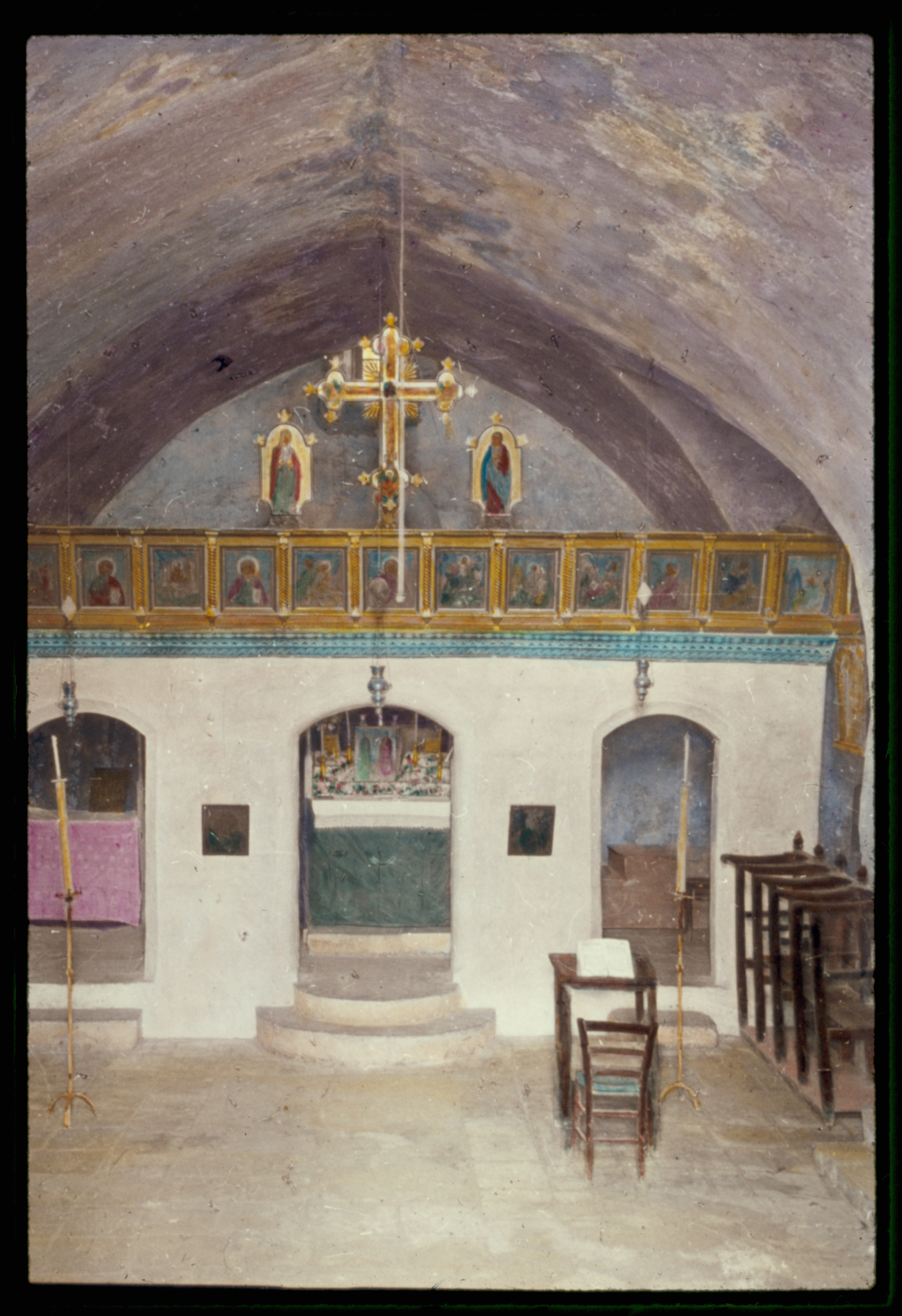
Previous interior when the church had an iconostasis.

The Synagogue Church (Hebrew: כְּנֵסִיַּת בֵּית הַכְּנֶסֶת) is a small Christian church in the heart of Nazareth, Israel, known by this name due to a tradition claiming that it is the location where the village synagogue stood in Jesus' time. Above its doorway is an embedded sign in Arabic and English: "Synagogue". The tradition is doubted by archaeologists.

The structure is administered by the Melkite Greek Catholic Church.

== History ==
In 570, an Italian visitor described Nazareth's synagogue, and reported that the original Bible was still there, including the bench where Jesus used to sit.

The floor of the Synagogue Church is sunken about 1.5 meters underground, possibly built atop a Crusader church dating from the 12th century.

The church was under the control of the Franciscans until the 18th century, when the ruler Zahir al-Umar passed it to the Greek Catholics. In 1887, the Melkite Greek Catholic parish church of the Annunciation was built adjacent to the Synagogue Church.

== Christian tradition ==
According to Christian tradition, the church is built on the ruins of the ancient Nazareth synagogue where Jesus studied and prayed. However, the current building is medieval and there is no evidence that any Roman-period public building was on the site.

== See also ==
- Greek Catholic Church of Nazareth
- Melkite Greek Catholic Archeparchy of Akka
- Catholic Church in Israel
