= Pelagia of Tinos =

Christian saint

Saint Pelagia of Tinos
- Born: Loukia; 1752; Kampo, Tinos, Ottoman Empire
- Died: 28 April 1834 (aged 81–82); Tinos, Kingdom of Greece
- Honored in: Eastern Orthodox Church
- Canonized: 11 September 1970
- Feast: 23 July

Pelagia (born Loukia; 1752 – 28 April 1834), distinguished as Pelagia of Tinos, is an Eastern Orthodox saint credited with receiving visions of the Virgin Mary which directed her to the lost icon of Our Lady of Tinos in 1822, shortly after the establishment of modern Greece. The icon has become the major site for Christian pilgrimage in Greece.

Born in 1752 on the island of Tinos, she became a nun at age 15, taking the name Pelagia. She continued to work throughout her life at the Kechrovouni Monastery in Tinos. Starting in July of 1822, Pelagia had visions of a woman (who she came to believe was the Virgin Mary) who told her to unearth the church of St. John the Baptist that lied in a field underground. The remnants of the church was unearthed in 1833, after a worker discovered an icon of the annunciation. Pelagia died on 28 April 1834, still on the island of Tinos.

This series of visions and excavations started the veneration of Our Lady of Tinos. Pelagia was canonized a saint on 11 September 1970, and Tinos continues to host large pilgrimages to the icon she found.

== Biography ==
=== Early life ===
In 1752, Loukia was born in the village of Kampo in on the island of Tinos to a priest named Nikiforos Negrepontis, as part of the Fragkoulis family. Her mother was from Tripotamos in Tinos, and the family had three other daughters.

Her father died when she was a child, and at age 15 she decided to become a nun, and going under the supervision of her aunt, named Pelagia. Loukia joined her aunt at the Kechrovouni Monastery in Tinos, taking the monastic name Pelagia after her.

=== Vision of the Virgin Mary ===
Pelagia was still a nun on the island of Tinos in her 70s when she had a vision on 9 July 1822. In this vision, Pelagia saw majestic lady with a halo. The lady explained how she suffered from being buried underground for many years. The woman told Pelagia find Stamatelos Kangades, a prominent man, and tell him to unearth the church of St. John the Baptist that was in a field which a man named Anthony Doxaras owned. Pelagia did not believe the validity of the vision at first.

Pelagia had a second vision, but still made no remark on it to anyone. After a third vision, Pelagia came to believe that it was legitimately the Virgin Mary speaking to her, and followed the instructions she had mystically received. Pelagia informed her superior nun, along with Kangades and the local bishop Gabriel, of her visions.

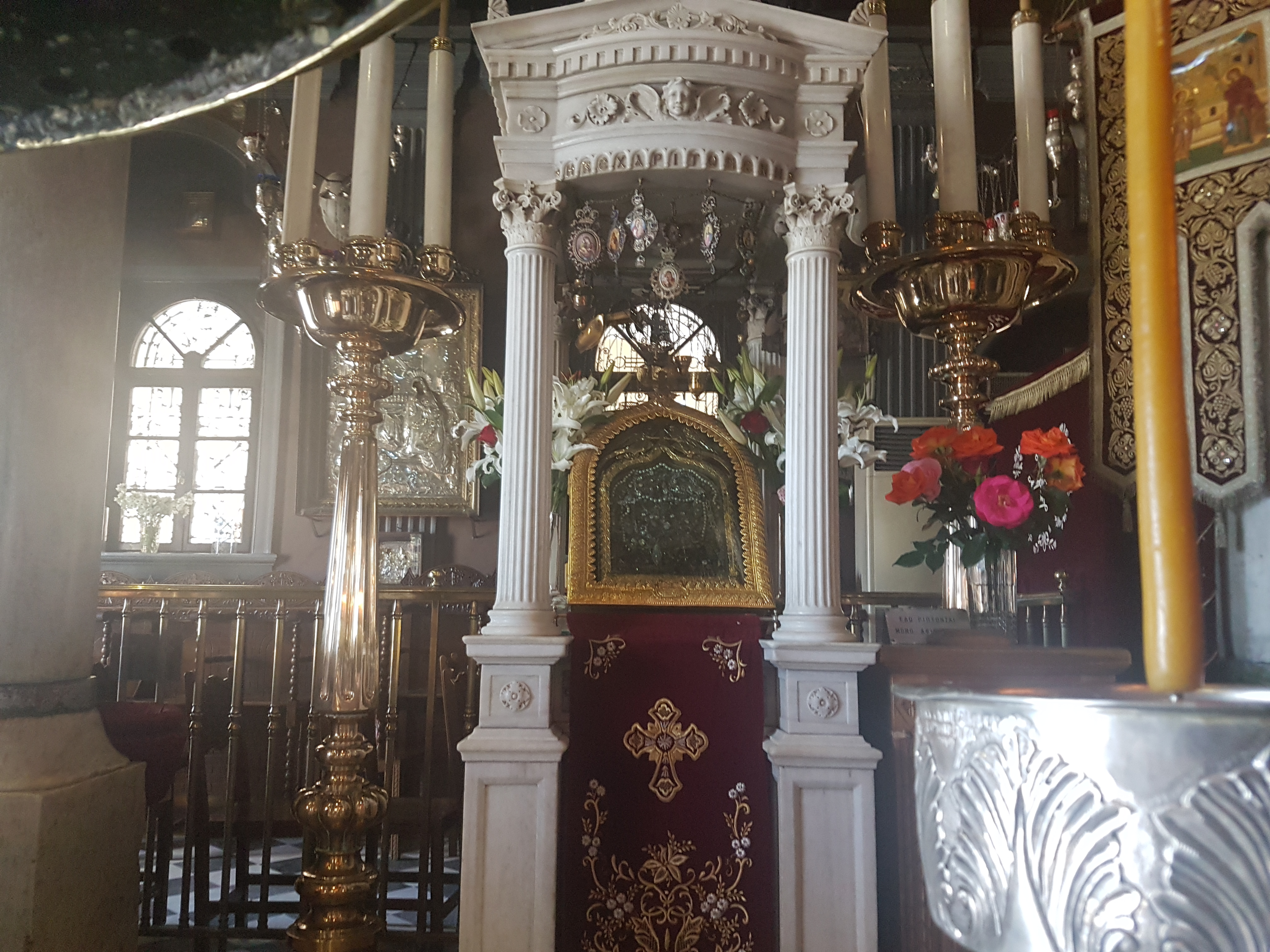
The icon of the Annunciation, housed in Tinos

The bishop Gabriel had heard a similar testimony from an elderly man named Michael Polyzoes who had a vision of the Virgin Mary before 25 March 1821. An expedition was called, and uncovered the foundations of the church of St. John the Baptist that was destroyed in the 10th century by the Saracens, but after funding ran out, the effort stopped. Pelagia had another vision in which the Virgin Mary urged continuation of the project, and the bishop solicited donations to continue the work.

On 30 January 1823, a worker named Emmanuel Matsos discovered an icon of the annunciation after he had accidentally cut it in half, without damaging the figures of Mary or the Archangel Gabriel. The church was completed later that year and consecrated by Bishop Gabriel.

=== Death ===
Pelagia died on 28 April 1834. She was buried in the church of the Taxiarches at the Kechrovouni monastery she served in.

== Legacy ==
Tinos hosts large numbers of pilgrims to the church of Our Lady of Tinos, who come to see the icon of the Annunciation. The icon is believed to have produced many miracles, and is attributed to Luke the Apostle. Numerous feast days related to Pelagia, the icon, and the visions take place throughout the year on Tinos.

== Veneration ==
Pelagia is a saint in the Eastern Orthodox Church, and her feast day is celebrated on 23 July. She was declared to be a saint on 11 September 1970 by the Greek Orthodox Church.

In 1973, a church dedicated to her was built, which houses her relics, and her head is kept in the Kechrovouni Monastery and is particularly venerated.

== See also ==
- Other saints named Pelagia
