= Greek Church (Brașov) =

Orthodox church in Brasov, Romania

Coordinates: 45°38′29″N 25°35′15″E

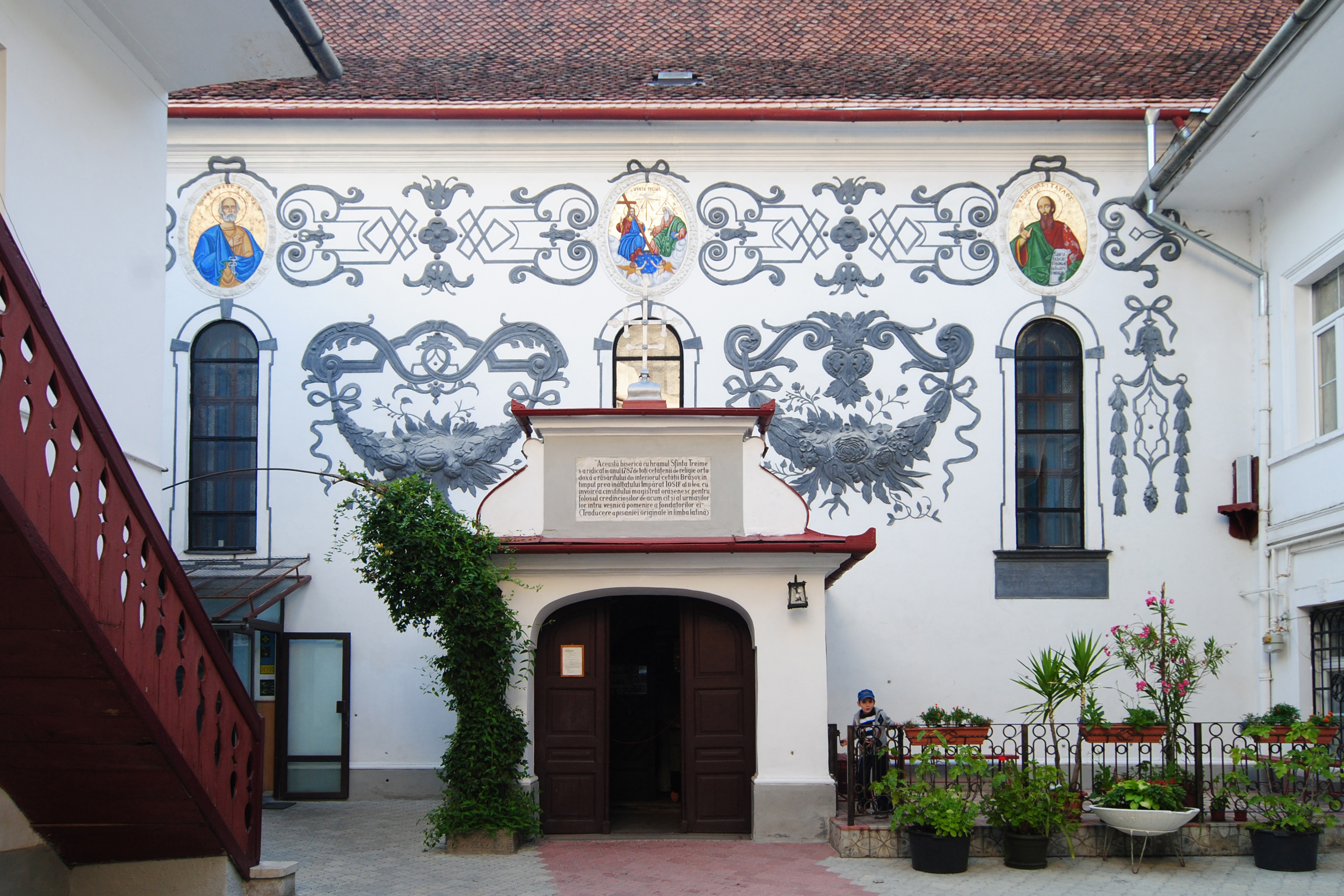
Greek Church

The Greek Church (Romanian: Biserica Grecilor) is a Romanian Orthodox church located at 12 Gheorghe Barițiu Street, Brașov, Romania. It is dedicated to the Holy Trinity.

== History ==
The church was built by Orthodox guild members and merchants of various nationalities: Romanians, Greeks, Aromanians, Serbs and Bulgarians, all residing within the Brașov Citadel. It was completed in 1787. A church school was established in 1799.

As modern national identities emerged from the 1780s, both the wealthy church and its school were subject to a bitter, century-long dispute for control. The vying “Greek” and “Romanian” parties were initially split along socio-economic lines, with the early Greek party including Romanians and vice versa, but eventually acquired an ethnic character and poisoned relations between the two communities. The language of church and school continued to be Greek under Austria-Hungary, as the judicial case was finally won by the Greek faction.

However, the local Greek community was in serious decline during the late 19th century, with the Xeropotamou Monastery of Mount Athos refusing to send a new priest in 1892, citing the church’s poor condition. By that time, most Greek speakers seem to have adopted a modern Romanian identity. Due to a lack of students, the school closed in 1908. The last Greek priest left in 1946.

== Description ==
The church measures 20.5 by 8.5 meters and is 11 meters high. The walls are of stone and brick. It is shaped like a ship, with arches and lengthy semicircular windows. The Baroque facade is richly ornamented with stucco plants and flowers. A small entry room was added in 1958, and an inscription in 1977, translating the original. In 1959, the interior was painted with floral motifs, and the iconostasis gilt. The icons of Christ Pantocrator and the Madonna and Child are especially fine. The last restoration of the paintings took place in 1987.

A defensive tower that forms part of the citadel wall adjoins the church wall. This tower, over 12 meters high, includes bells and semantron from the 20th century. It provides access to the cemetery. Dositei Filitti, Metropolitan Bishop of Wallachia, lies buried there, as does the chief ktetor, Panaiot Hagi Nica. A number of royal figures are in the Brâncoveanu family crypt.

The church is listed as a historic monument by Romania's Ministry of Culture and Religious Affairs, as are the cemetery and one of the crosses.
