= Hellenic Orthodox Church of the Annunciation =

Historic church in Buffalo, New York

- U.S. National Register of Historic Places
- New York State Register of Historic Places
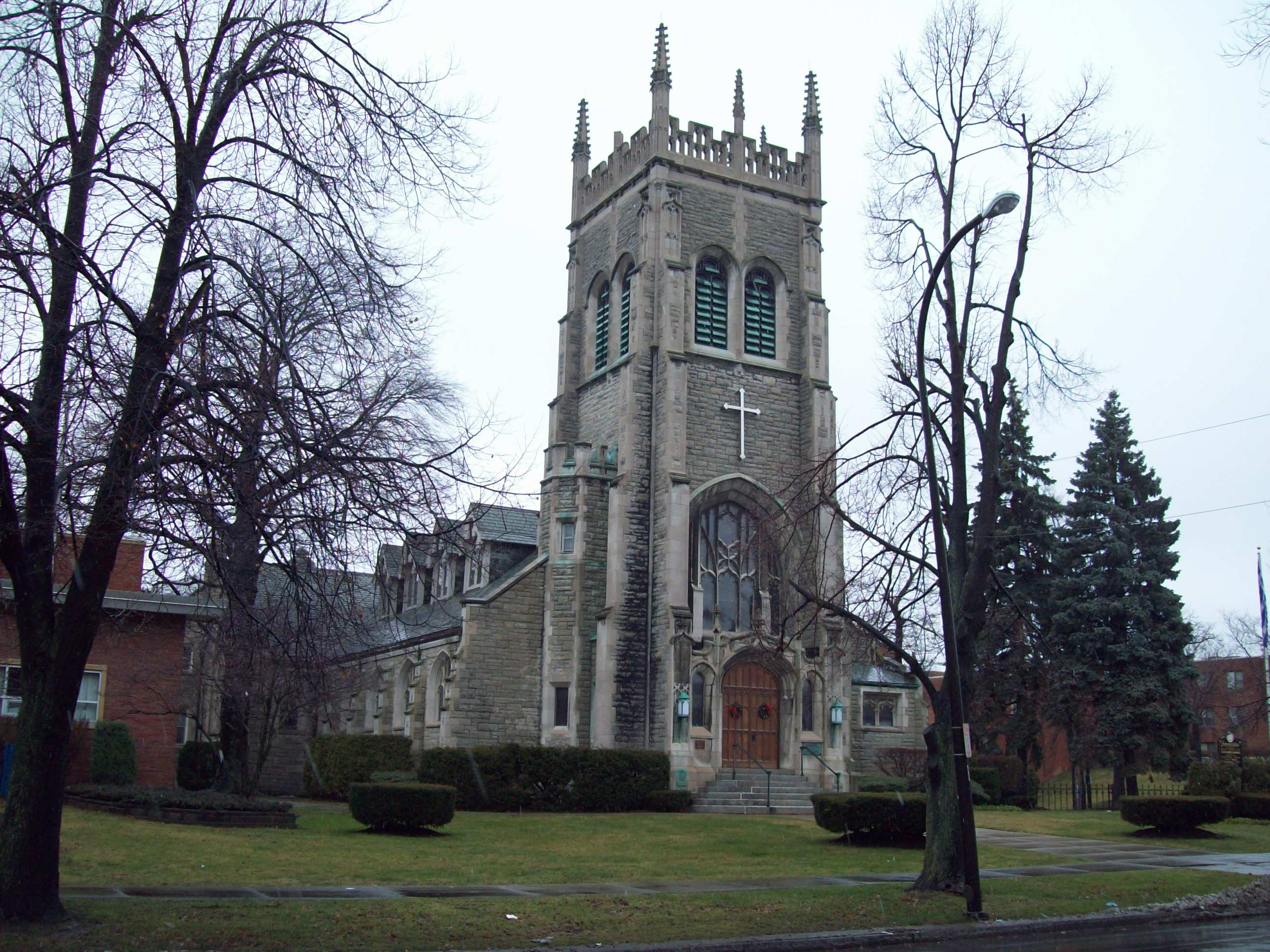
- Hellenic Orthodox Church of the Annunciation, December 2009

- Location within New York Location within the United States
- Location: 1000 Delaware Ave., Buffalo, New York
- Coordinates: 42°54′39″N 78°52′20″W
- Area: 1.3 acres (0.53 ha)
- Built: 1906
- Architects: Newton, George F.; et al.
- Architectural style: Late Gothic Revival
- NRHP reference No.: 02001329
- NYSRHP No.: 02940.001760

Significant dates
- Added to NRHP: November 13, 2002
- Designated NYSRHP: August 15, 2002

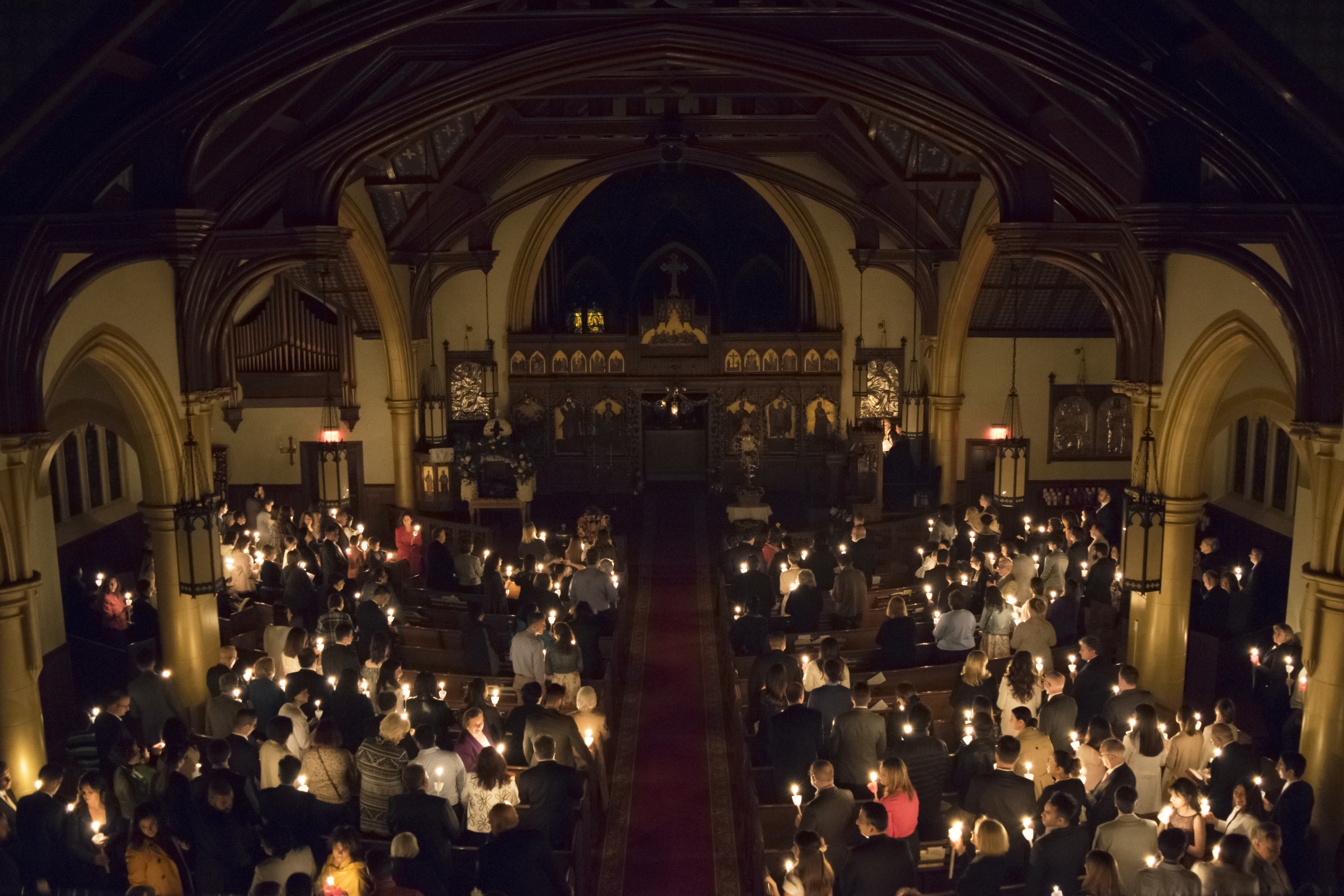
The church community celebrating the Resurrection of Christ.

Hellenic Orthodox Church of the Annunciation, formerly known as North Presbyterian Church, is a historic Greek Orthodox church located at Buffalo in Erie County, New York. It is a Gothic Revival-style church designed by Boston architect George F. Newton and constructed in 1906, as home to North Presbyterian Church. In 1952, the church became the Hellenic Orthodox Church of the Annunciation.

It was listed on the National Register of Historic Places in 2002.
