= Annunciation Greek Orthodox Church (Newburyport, Massachusetts) =

Church in Massachusetts, United States

Coordinates: 42.8091°N 70.8721°W

The Annunciation Greek Orthodox Church of Newburyport is a Greek Orthodox Church in Newburyport, Massachusetts.
