= Annunciation Church, Kozarë =

Annunciation Church
- Kisha e Ungjillizimit (Albanian)

Cultural Monument of Albania

The Annunciation Church (Albanian: Kisha e Ungjillizimit) is a Cultural Monument of Albania, located in Kozarë, Berat County. It became a Cultural Monument in 1963.
