= Greek Church (Constanța) =

Heritage site in Constanța County, Romania

Coordinates: 44°10′38″N 28°39′22″E

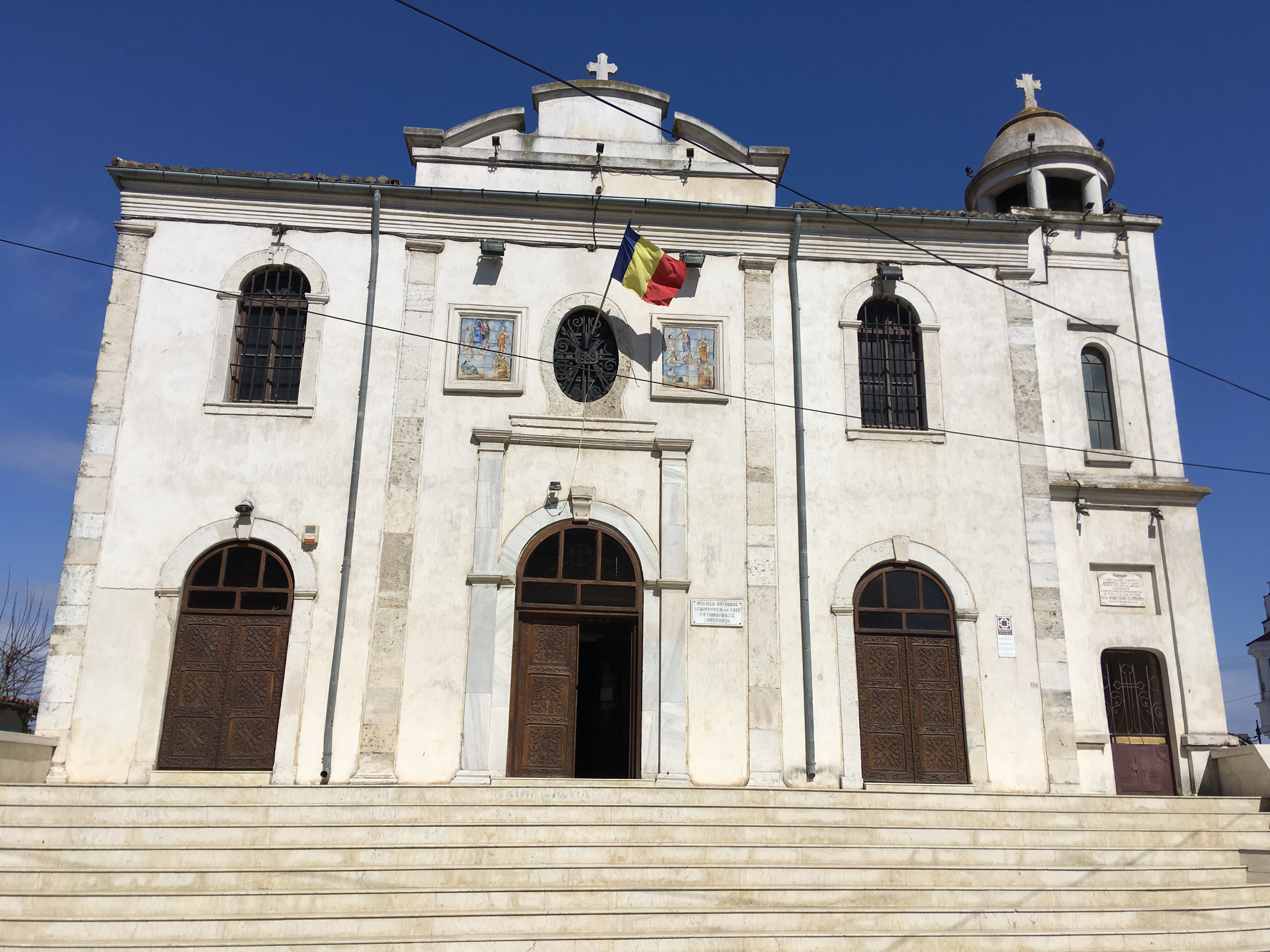
Greek Church

The Greek Church is a Romanian Orthodox church located at 36 Mircea cel Bătrân Street, Constanța, Romania. It is dedicated to the Feast of the Transfiguration.

The oldest church in Constanța, it was built between 1865 and 1867, following a firman issued by Ottoman Sultan Abdulaziz. It is rectangular in shape and does not have spires; as emphasized in the decree, churches in the Ottoman Empire could not be taller than mosques. The painting was done by a renowned iconographer from Mount Athos. In November 1878, a Te Deum was held inside, celebrating victory in the Romanian War of Independence and Northern Dobruja’s annexation to the Old Kingdom.

As the church building was deteriorating and the parish lacked repair funds, the local Greek community requested to be taken under Romanian Orthodox jurisdiction. Their petition was approved in 1974. The painting was redone by 1991. Services are held in Romanian and Greek.

Since 1954, the church has been listed as a historic monument by Romania's Ministry of Culture and Religious Affairs.
