= Annunciation Monastery, Albania =

Cultural monument in Albania

Annunciation Monastery
- Manastiri i Ungjillizimit (Albanian)
- Location within Albania
- 40.0033°N 20.1779°E

Cultural Monument of Albania

The Annunciation Monastery (Albanian: Manastiri i Ungjillizimit) is a Cultural Monument of Albania, located in Vanistër, Gjirokastër County.
