= Church of the Annunciation (Shelbyville, Kentucky) =

Historic church in Kentucky, United States

- U.S. National Register of Historic Places
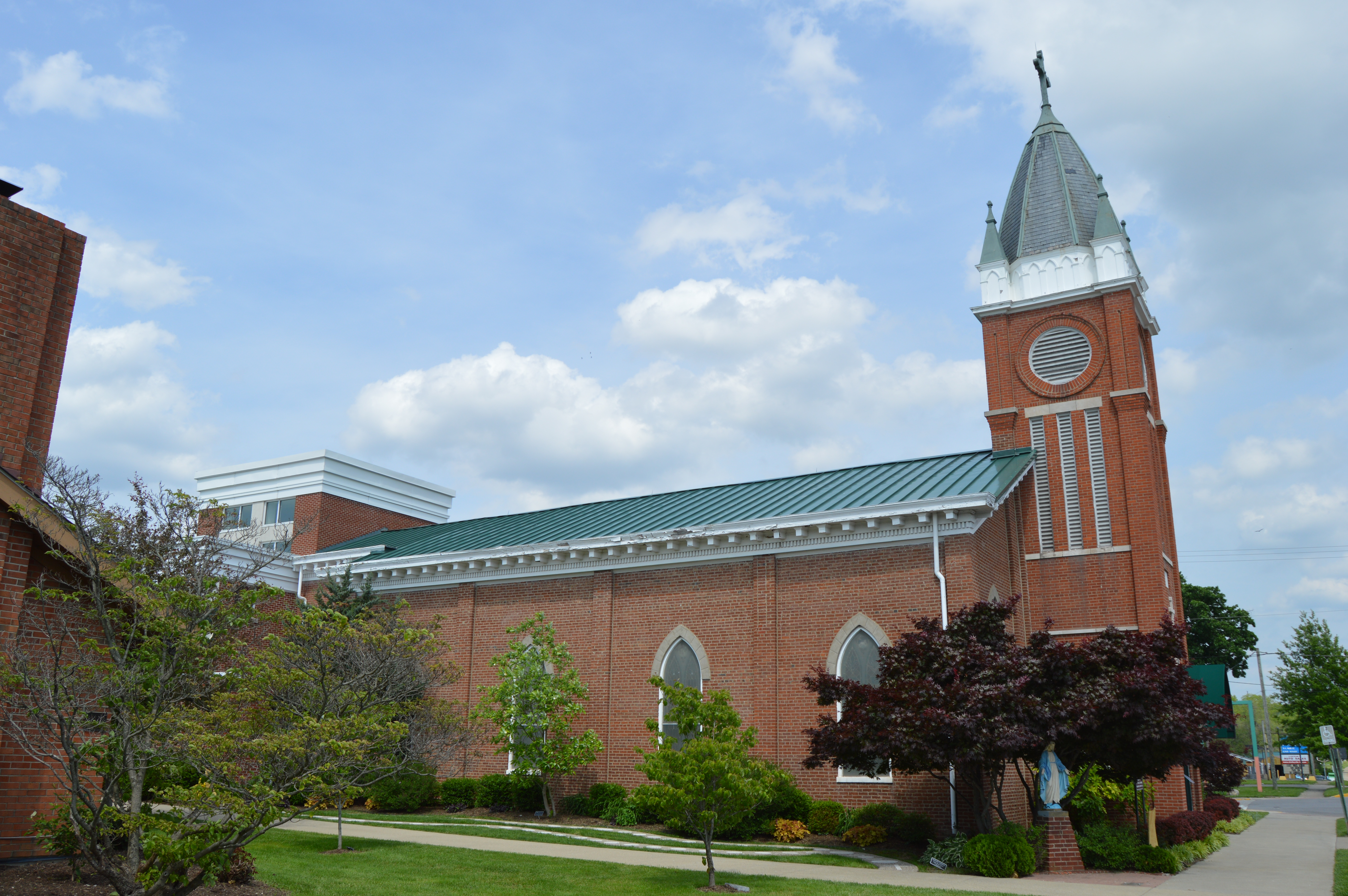
- Western side

- Location within Kentucky Location within the United States
- Location: 105 Main St., Shelbyville, Kentucky
- Coordinates: 38°12′39″N 85°12′37″W
- Area: 0.5 acres (0.20 ha)
- Built: 1860
- Architectural style: Gothic Revival
- MPS: Shelbyville MRA
- NRHP reference No.: 84002011
- Added to NRHP: September 28, 1984

Church of the Annunciation is a historic Roman Catholic church at 105 Main Street in Shelbyville, Kentucky, United States. It was built in 1860 and added to the National Register of Historic Places in 1984.

It was built in 1860, after the first Roman Catholic priest came to Shelbyville in 1842. It is a two-story brick Gothic Revival-style church built with stone sills and arches. It has a three-story tower.

It was listed as part of a larger study of historic resources in Shelbyville.
