= Greek Catholic Church of Nazareth =

Coordinates: 32.7033°N 35.2972°E

Greek Catholic Church of the Annunciation
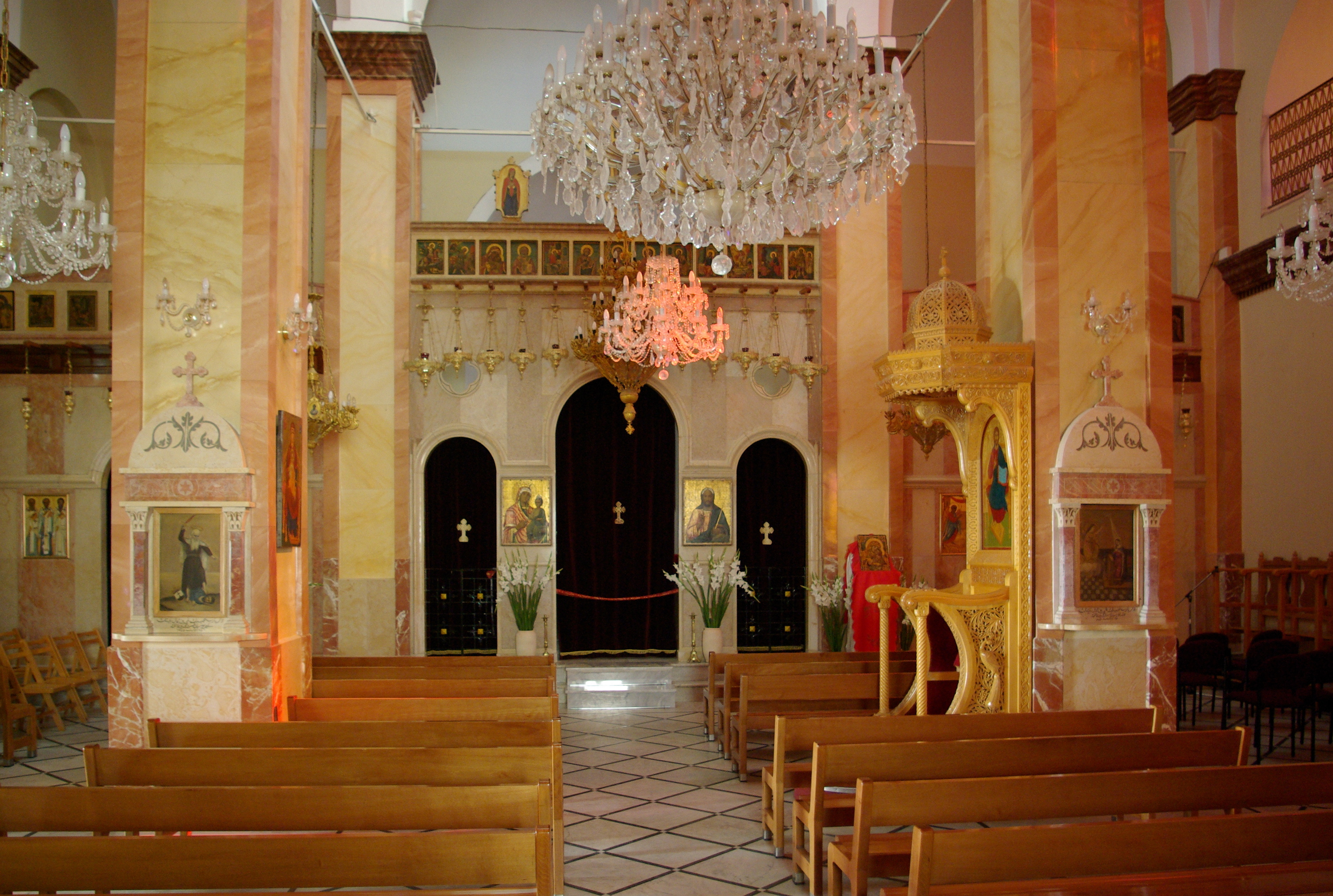
- Greek Catholic Church of the Annunciation
- Location: Nazareth
- Country: Israel
- Denomination: Melkite Greek Catholic Church

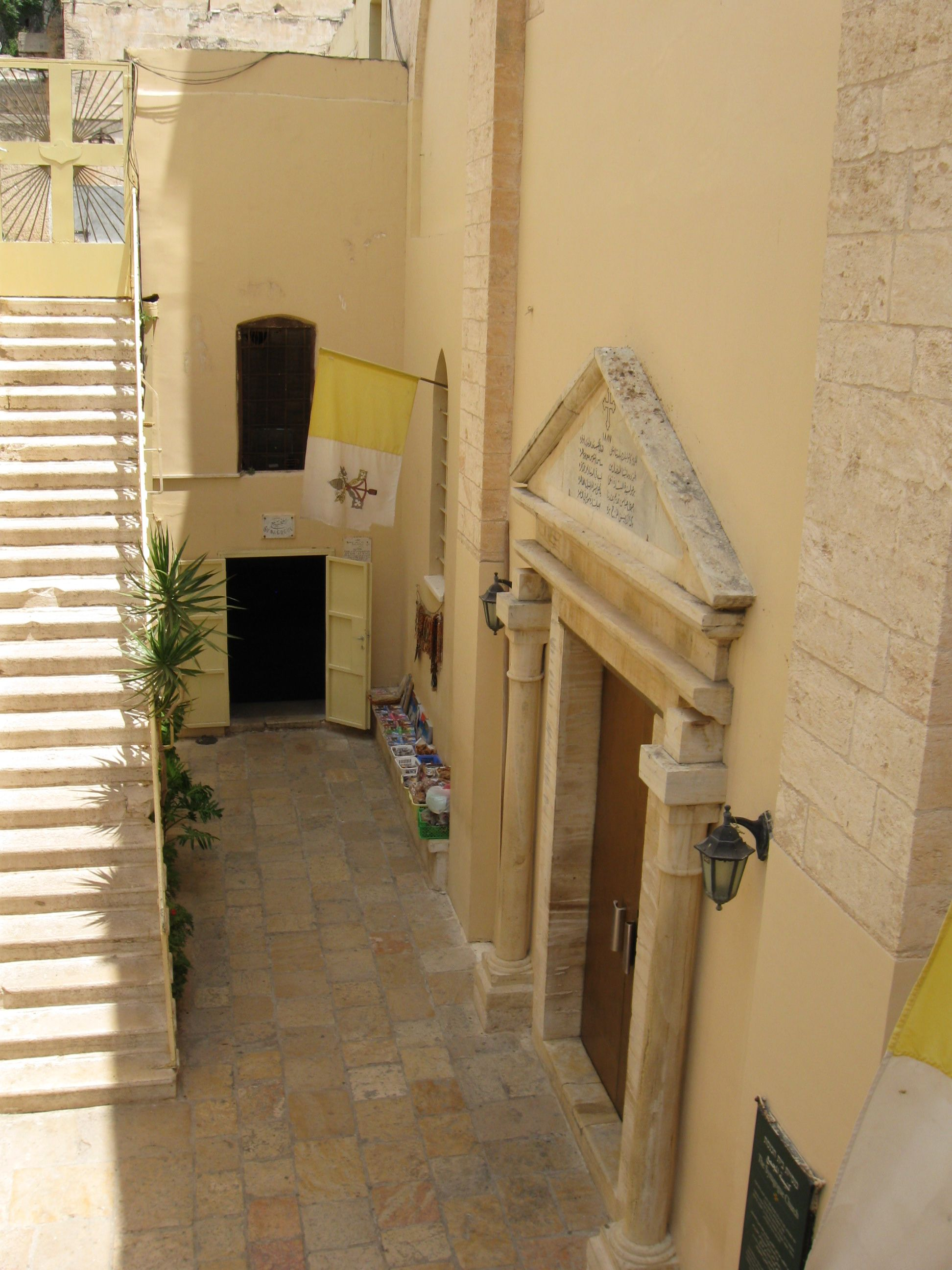
The entrance to both the Greek Catholic church (under the pediment) and the Synagogue Church (at the end of the courtyard).

The Greek Catholic Church of the Annunciation is the parish church of the Melkite Greek Catholic community in the city of Nazareth in northern Israel.

== Description ==
This large church was built in 1887, adjacent to the Synagogue Church. (Due to its close proximity, the parish church is often misindentified as being the Synagogue Church.) The compound houses a primary school, secondary school, seminary, and parish.

The interior of the church has three naves divided by two rows of columns. The set is richly decorated with paintings and icons.

== See also ==
- Melkite Greek Catholic Archeparchy of Akka
- Catholic Church in Israel
- Greek Catholic Church
