= Church of the Annunciation, Cincinnati =

Church in Ohio, United States

Coordinates: 39°8′50″N 84°31′10″W

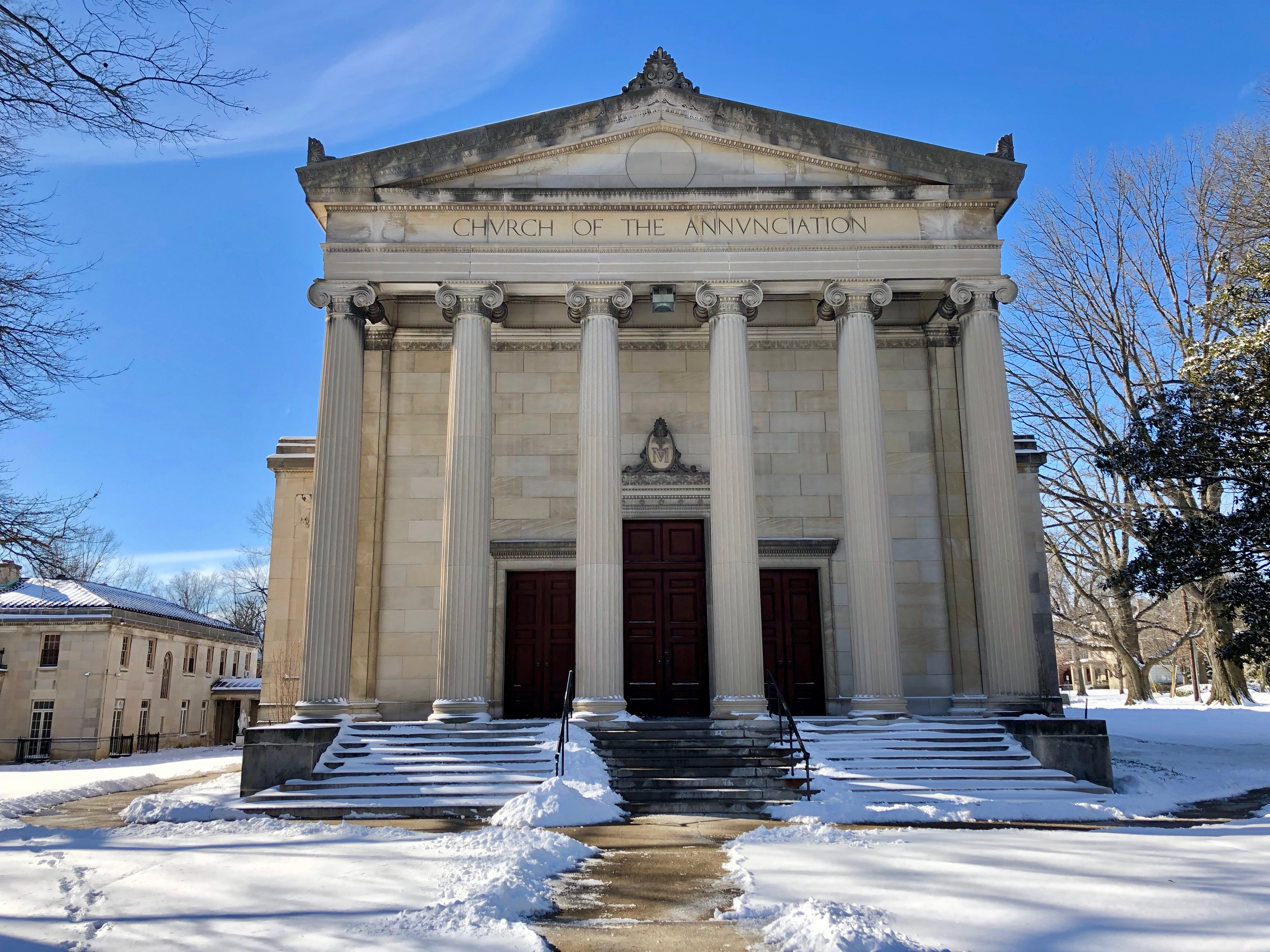

The Church of the Annunciation is located at 3547 Clifton Avenue at Resor Street in Cincinnati, Ohio, United States. The Church is located in the Clifton neighborhood. It is part of the Clifton Avenue Historic District. This historic parish was founded in February 1910 and the present building was completed in August 1930. This church was designed by Boston architect Edward T. P. Graham, who was active in both the Archdiocese of Boston and the Archdiocese of Cincinnati in the first half of the 20th century.
