= Annunciation Church, Mjekës =

Church in Albania

Annunciation Church
- Rrënojat e Kishës së Ungjillizimit (Albanian)

Cultural Monument of Albania
- Designated: 1970

The Annunciation Church (Albanian: Rrënojat e Kishës së Ungjillizimit) is a Cultural Monument of Albania, located in Mjekës, Shirgjan municipal unit of the Elbasan County.
