= Annunciation Church, Walsall =

Church in the West Midlands, England

Coordinates: 52.55873°N 1.96012°W

The Church of the Annunciation, Walsall
- The Mission Church of the Annunciation, Yew Tree, Walsall
- The Church of the Annunciation, Walsall
- Country: England
- Denomination: Church of England
- Churchmanship: Traditional Catholic
- Website: www.stgabrielschurchfullbrook.com

History
- Dedication: The Annunciation
- Dedicated: 27 March 1958

Architecture
- Architect: Hickton Madely

Administration
- Province: Canterbury
- Diocese: Lichfield
- Archdeaconry: Walsall
- Deanery: Walsall
- Parish: St. Gabriel, Fullbrook, Walsall

Clergy
- Bishop: Rt Revd Paul Thomas SSC (AEO)
- Vicar: Fr Mark McIntyre CMP SSC

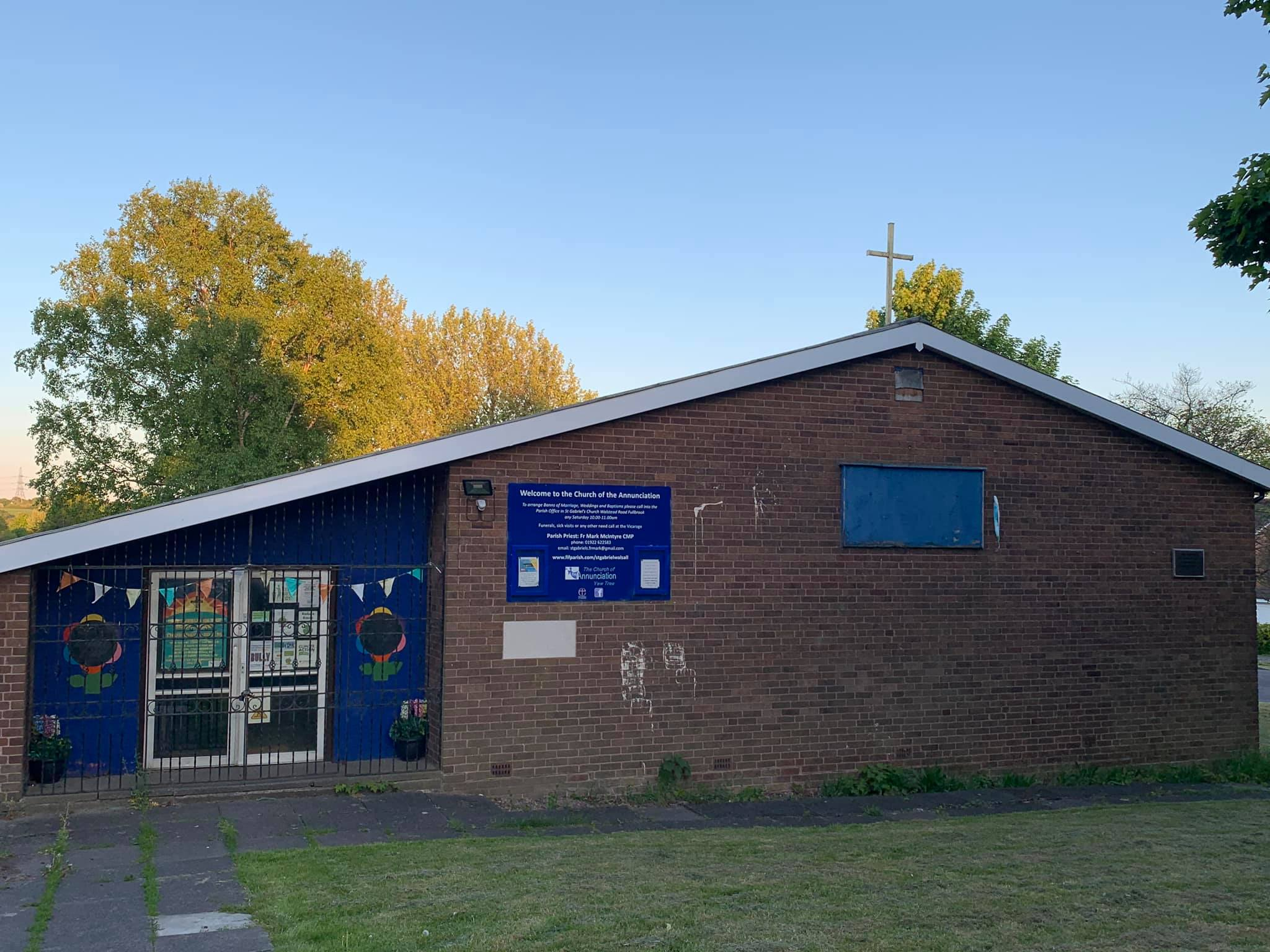
The Church of the Annunciation

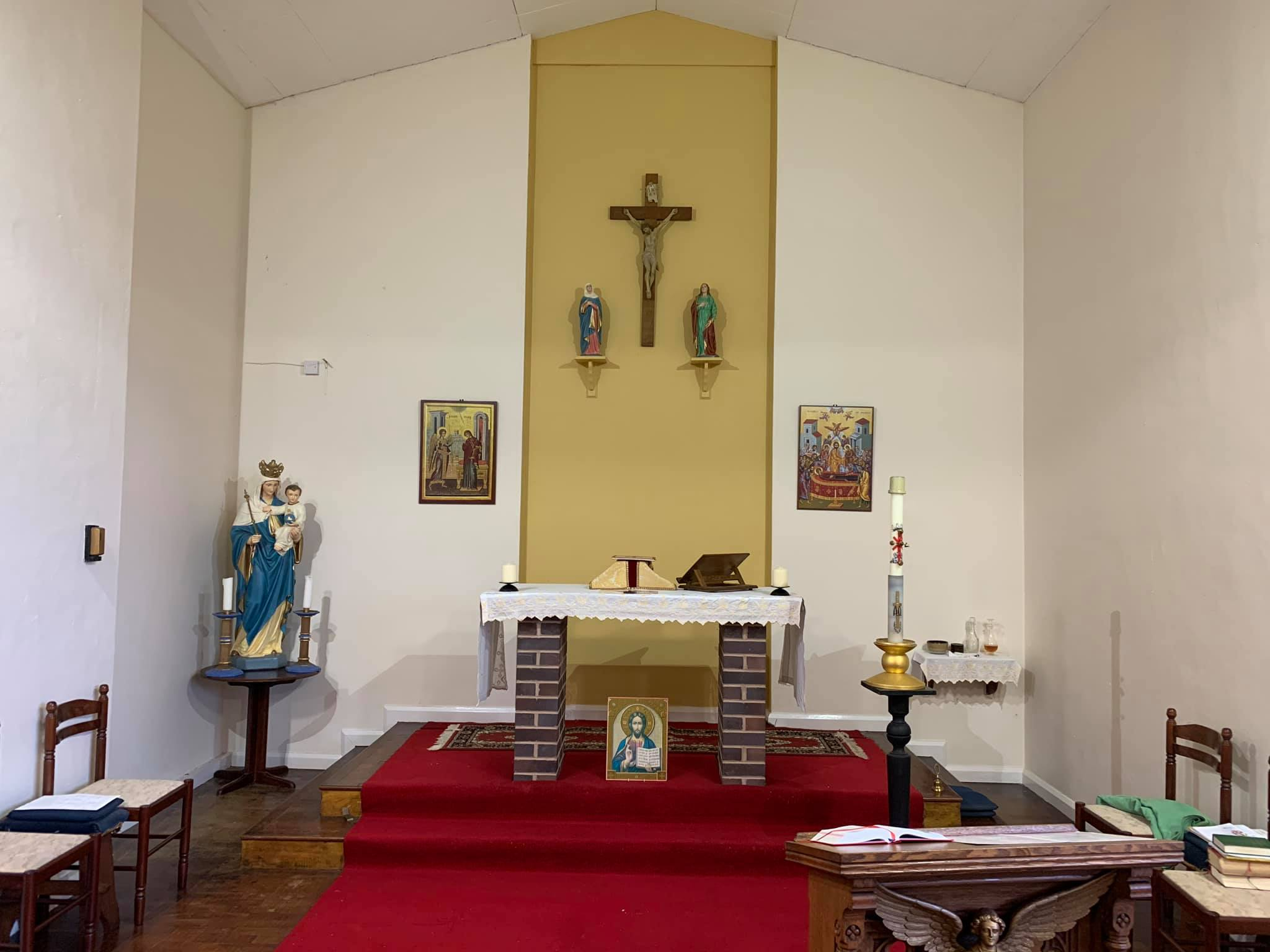
The Sanctuary

The Mission Church of the Annunciation is a Church of England church in Walsall, West Midlands. Within the parish of St Gabriel's, Fullbrook, it serves the Tamebrige and Yew Tree estate, built by West Bromwich Council in 1956.

== History ==
The church was dedicated by Rt Revd Stretton Reeve, Bishop of Lichfield, on 27 March 1958. The building was designed to be dual-purpose, with a sanctuary at one end and a stage at the other, with both capable of being curtained-off.

== Clergy ==
=== Vicars who have served The Annunciation ===
1958 - 1971 Fr S. Thomas;

1972 - 2010 Fr T. R. H. Coyne;

2011 - present Rev Prebendary Mark McIntyre CMP SSC.

=== Assistant priests ===
1958 - 1961 Fr E. Booth;

1967 - 1970 Fr K. Hill;

1970 - 1973 Fr H. Pascoe;

1974 - 1977 Fr N. Clapp;

1977 - 1978 Fr C. Marshall;

1980 - 1983 Fr B. Williams;

1988 - 1990 Fr G. Matthews;

1990 Fr D. Pearce;

1995 - 2004 Fr W. Poultney;

2000 - 2003 Fr E. Davies;

2005 - 2010 Fr N. Pierce;

2013 - 2016 Fr S. Oakes;

2019 - 2022 Fr R. Hume.
