= Annunciation Church (Houston) =

Catholic church in Houston, Texas, U.S.

- U.S. National Register of Historic Places
- Recorded Texas Historic Landmark
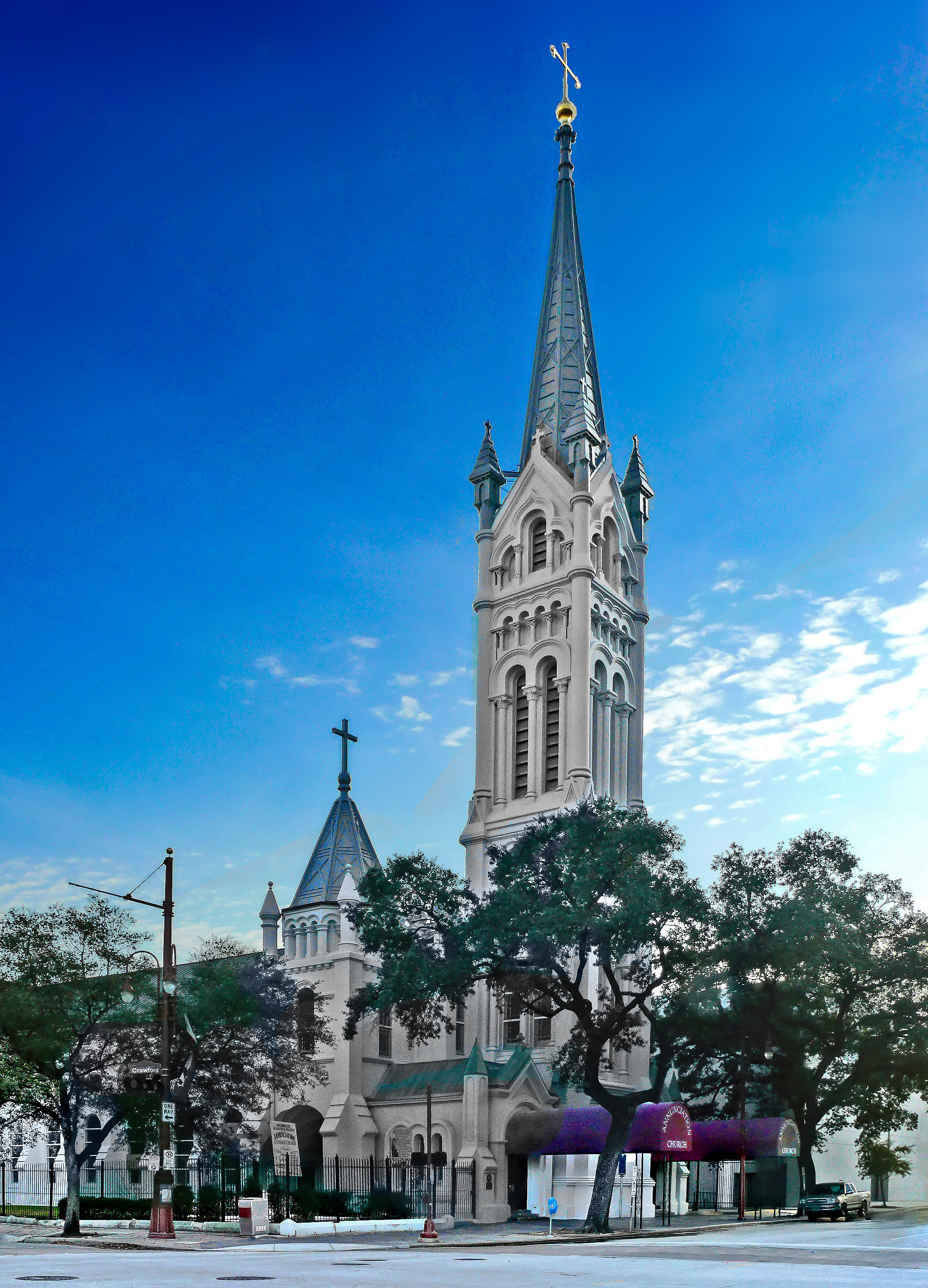
- The church in 2013

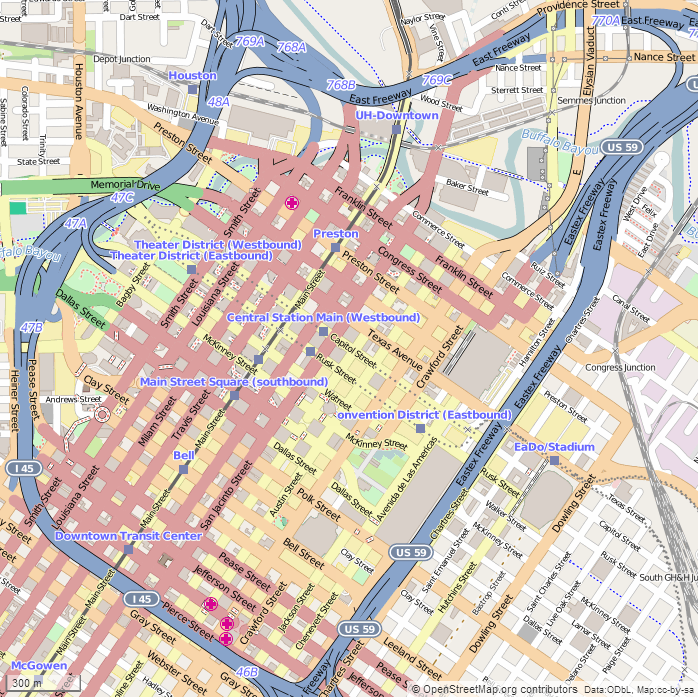
- Location within Houston Downtown Location within Texas Location within the United States
- Location: 1618 Texas Ave., Houston, Texas
- Coordinates: 29°45′23″N 95°21′25″W
- Area: 0.5 acres (0.20 ha)
- Built: 1869
- Architect: unknown (original); Nicholas J. Clayton (additions)
- Architectural style: Romanesque
- NRHP reference No.: 75001988
- RTHL No.: 10596

Significant dates
- Added to NRHP: November 03, 1975
- Designated RTHL: 1969

The Annunciation Church is a Catholic church located at the corner of Texas Avenue and Crawford Street in Downtown Houston, Texas.

== History ==
Annunciation Church sprung from the congregation at St. Vincent's, Houston's first Catholic church. In 1866, Father Joseph Querat and Galveston Bishop Claude M. Debuis believed the congregation was outgrowing the old building and started planning for a new one. The congregation chose the name for the planned building, "Church of the Annunciation." The original architect is unknown, but was dedicated on September 10, 1871. Nicholas J. Clayton altered the building, adding the bell tower twin towers in 1884.

The property is listed on the National Register of Historic Places.

The church remains Houston's oldest existing church and, as such, the property was eventually faced with a foundation problem. A large void had developed underneath the church's southwest corner and, symptomatically, the foundation subsided. Through a polymer injection process work at Annunciation Catholic Church was completed in two days with minimal disruption to mass and parishioners.

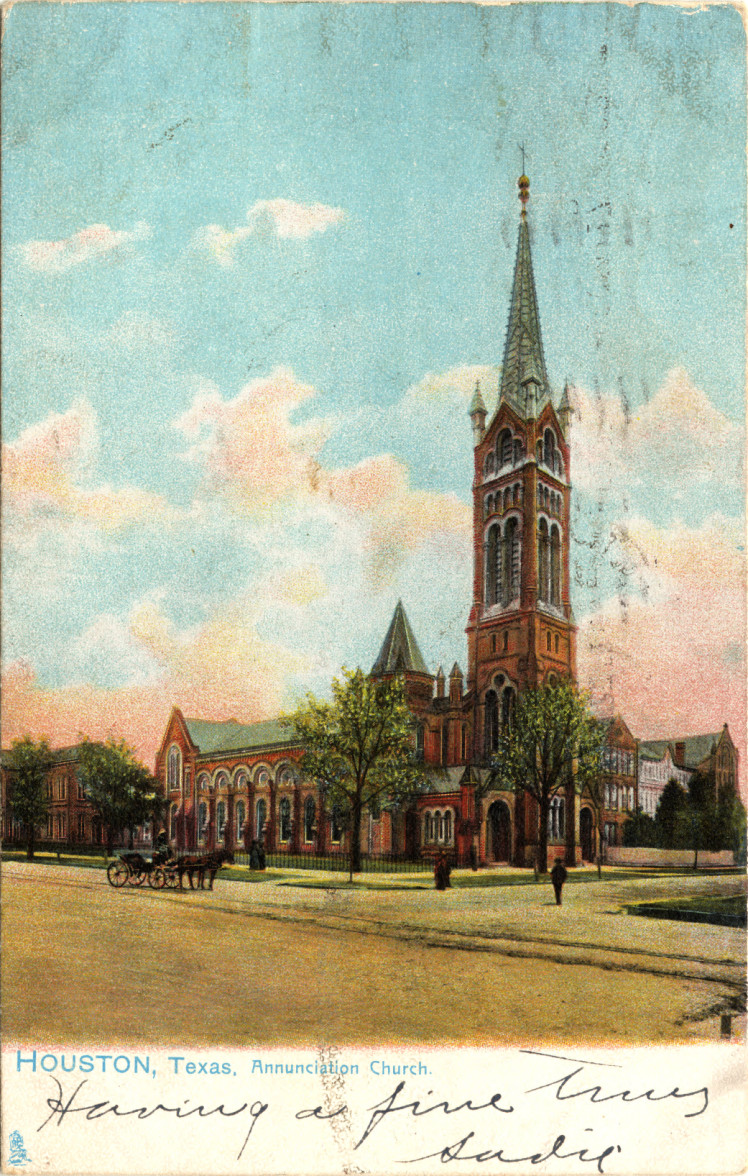
Postcard, c. 1907

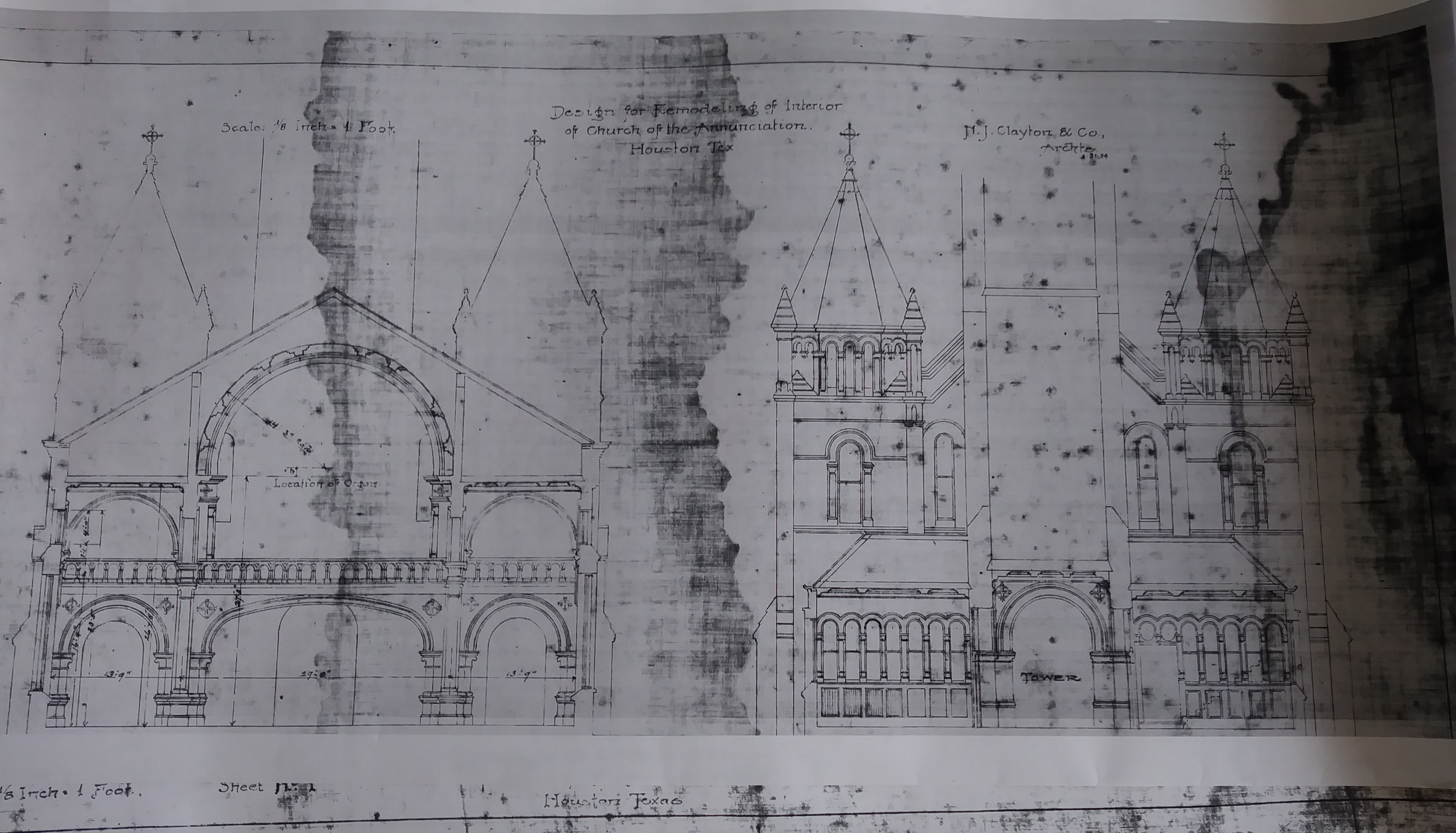
Nicholas Clayton's remodeling plan, 1893

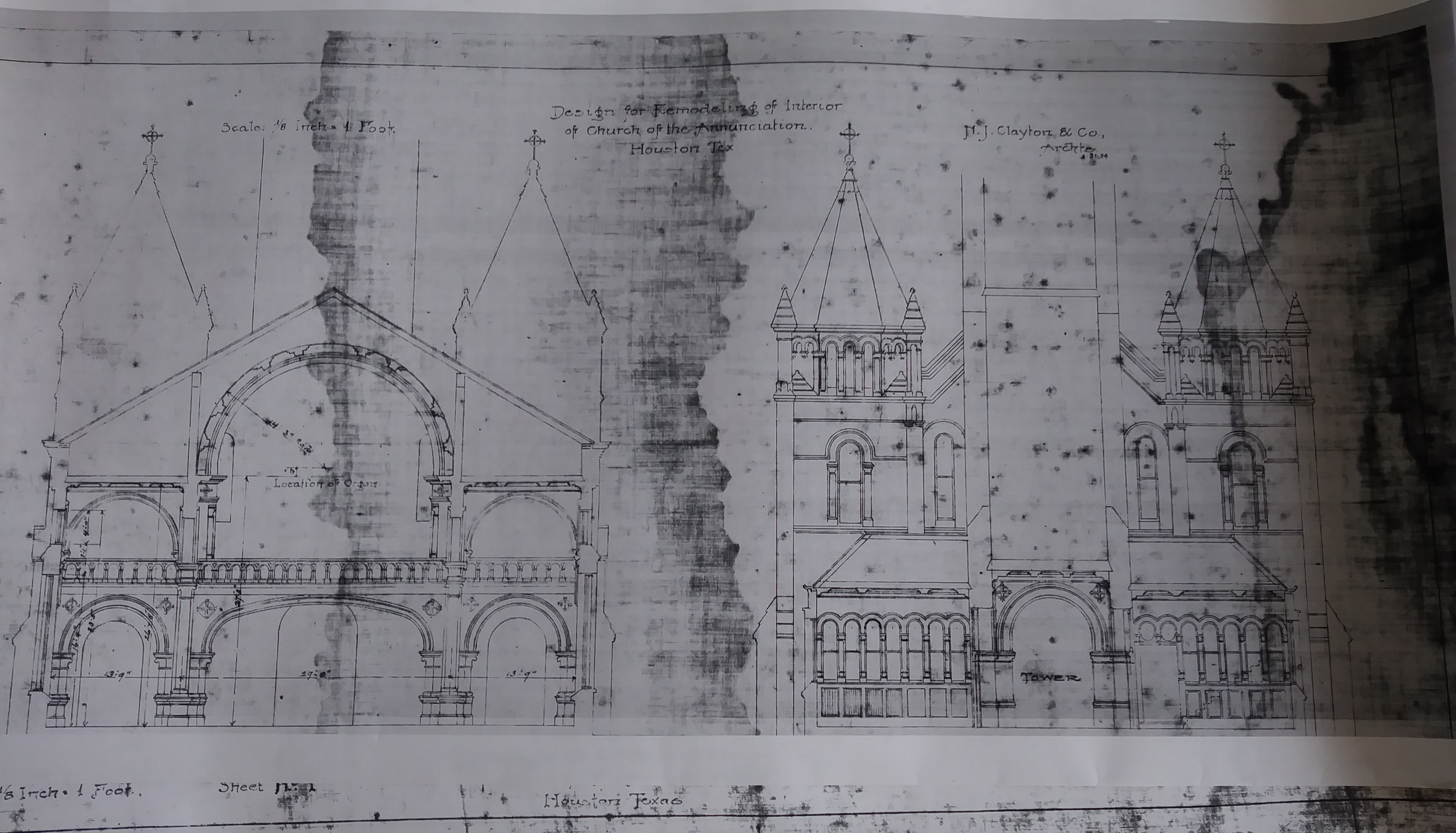
Nicholas Clayton remodeling plans, 1893

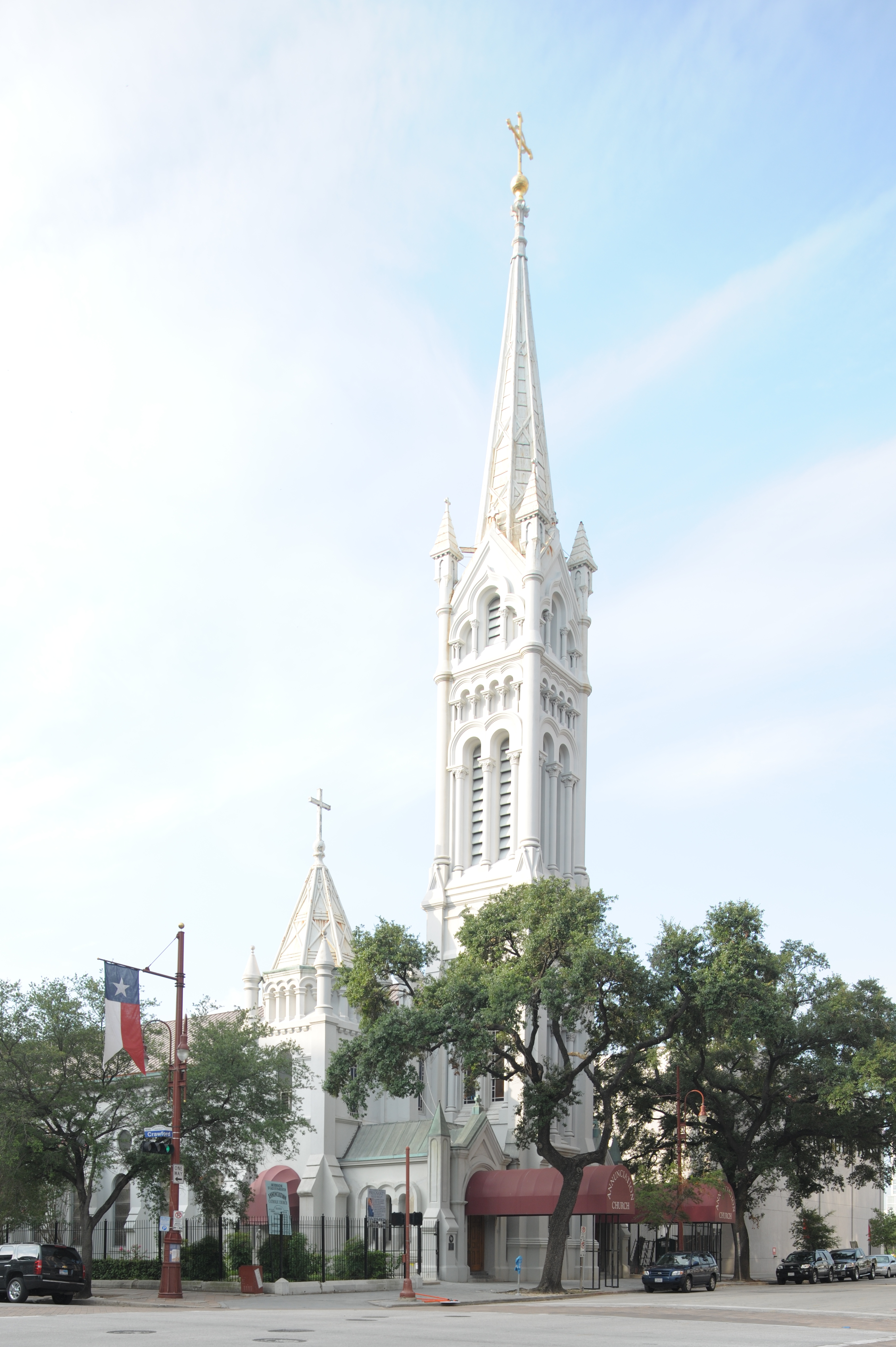
The church in 2010

== See also ==
- National Register of Historic Places listings in Harris County, Texas
