= Church of the Annunciation (Mohács) =

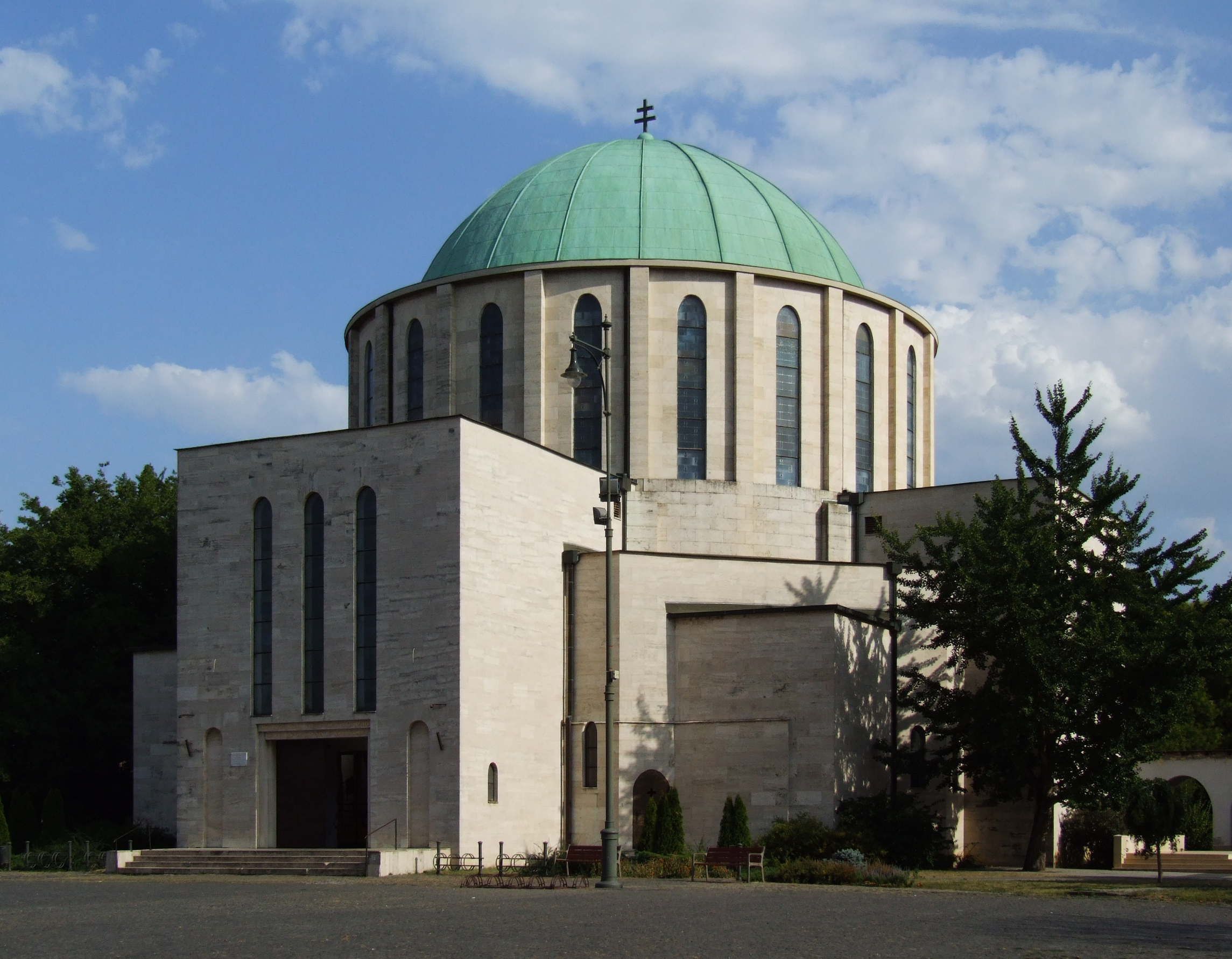
- Church of the Annunciation
- Location: Széchenyi Square, Mohács
- Country: Hungary
- Denomination: Roman Catholic Church

History
- Dedication: Virgin Mary
- Dedicated: 29. August 1940

Architecture
- Architect(s): Aladár Árkay, Bertalan Árkay

Administration
- Diocese: Pécs

The Magyarok Nagyasszonya church (Our Lady of Hungarians), also known as the Roman Catholic Memorial Church, the Votive Church, or the Battlefield Memorial Church, is a 20th-century Roman Catholic church in Mohács, Hungary. It is located on the main square (Széchenyi tér) and belongs to the Diocese of Pécs. The church was dedicated to Virgin Mary on the 29th of August 1940. The dome is 30 meters high and 20 meters wide. The floor area of 1,227 square meters can accommodate 3,600 visitors.
