= Our Lady of Tinos =

Major Marian shrine in Greece

- Holy Church of Panagia Evaggelistria of Tinos
- Evangelistria Church
- Παναγία Ευαγγελίστρια της Τήνου
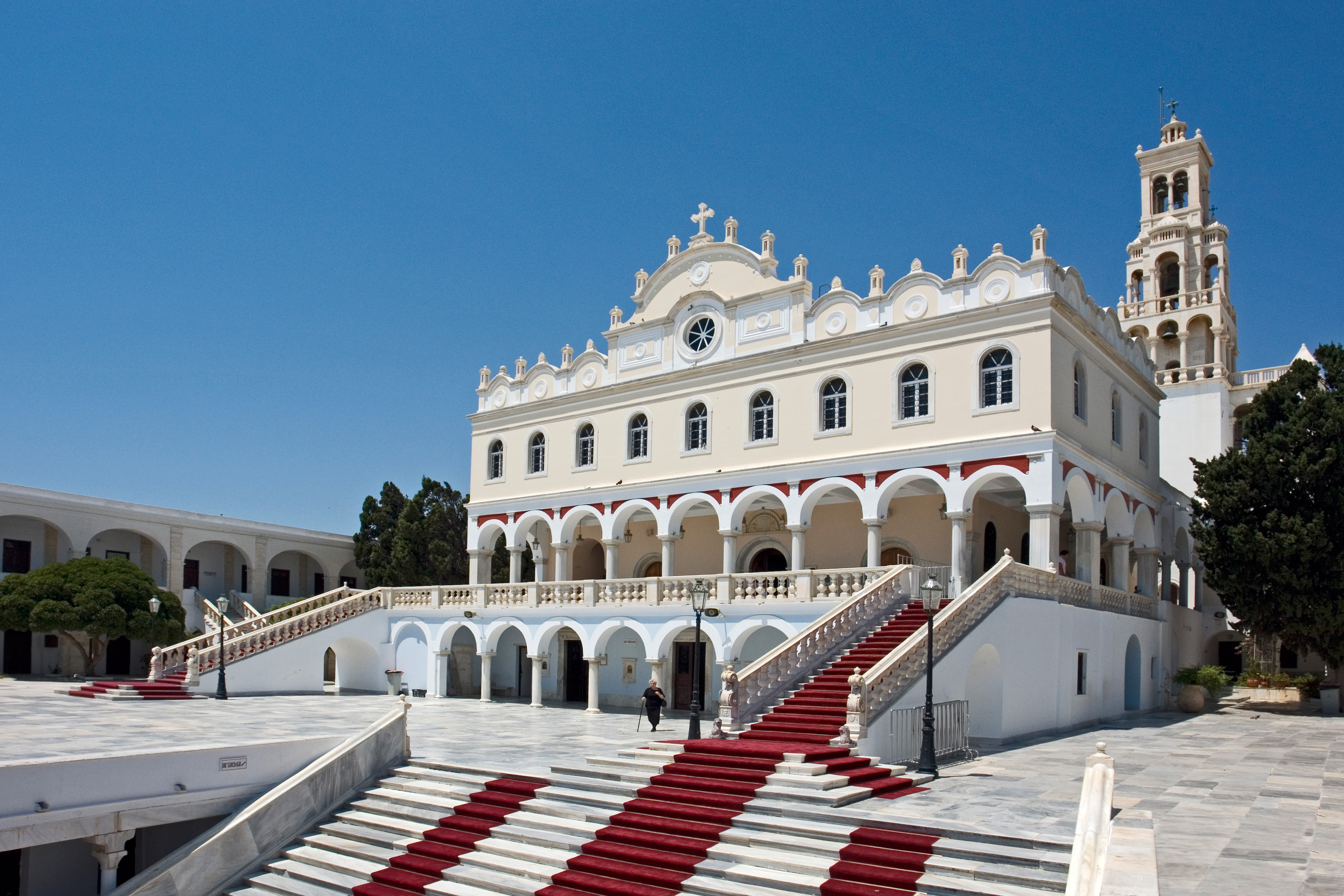
- Church of Our Lady of Tinos
- Our Lady of Tinos
- 37°32′33″N 25°09′46″E
- Location: Tinos town, Tinos island, Cyclades, South Aegean
- Country: Greece
- Language: Greek
- Denomination: Greek Orthodox
- Website: panagiatinou.gr/eng/

History
- Status: Church and Marian shrine
- Dedication: Annunciation of the Virgin Mary
- Events: January 30: Finding the icon; March 25: Annunciation; July 23: Pelagia's vision; August 15: Dormition

Architecture
- Functional status: Active
- Architect: Efstratios Kalonaris
- Architectural type: Basilica
- Style: Renaissance Revival; Neoclassical
- Completed: 1830

Specifications
- Materials: Marble; stone

Administration
- Province: Ecumenical Patriarchate of Constantinople
- Metropolis: Syros, Tinos, Andros, Kea and Milos

Our Lady of Tinos (Greek: Παναγία Ευαγγελίστρια της Τήνου, romanized: Panagía Evangelístria tēs Tēnou, lit. 'The All-Holy Bringer of Good News', and Greek: Μεγαλόχαρη της Τήνου, romanized: Megalócharē tēs Tēnou, lit. 'She of Great Grace'), officially the Holy Church of Panagia Evaggelistria of Tinos, and also known as the Evangelistria Church, is a Greek Orthodox church and Greece's major Marian shrine, located in the town of Tinos on the island of Tinos, on the Cyclades archipelago, in the South Aegean region of Greece.

The complex is built around a miraculous icon which according to tradition was found after the Virgin appeared to the nun, Pelagia, and revealed to her the place where the icon was buried. The icon is widely believed to be the source of numerous miracles. It is by now almost completely encased in silver, gold, and jewels, and is commonly referred to as the Megalócharē ("[She of] Great Grace") or simply the Chárē Tēs ("Her Grace"). By extension the church is often called the same, and is considered a protectress of seafarers and healer of the infirm.

== History ==
=== Saint Pelagia's visions of the Virgin Mary ===
According to tradition, in 1822, a Nun named Pelagia had mystical visions of the Virgin Mary. In these visions, Mary told Pelagia to unearth the old church of St. John the Baptist under a field on the island. Excavations that took place on January 30, 1823 eventually revealed an icon of the Annunciation, which from its finding was believed to be miraculous. Pelagia died in 1834, and was canonized as an Eastern Orthodox saint in 1970.

The icon was found on the very first days after the creation of the modern Greek State, and henceforth Our Lady of Tinos was declared the patron saint of the Greek nation. The miraculous icon was at the time thought to be the handwork of Saint Luke, the Evangelist, and a nationwide fund collection was carried out for the building of a church to house it.

=== Church design ===
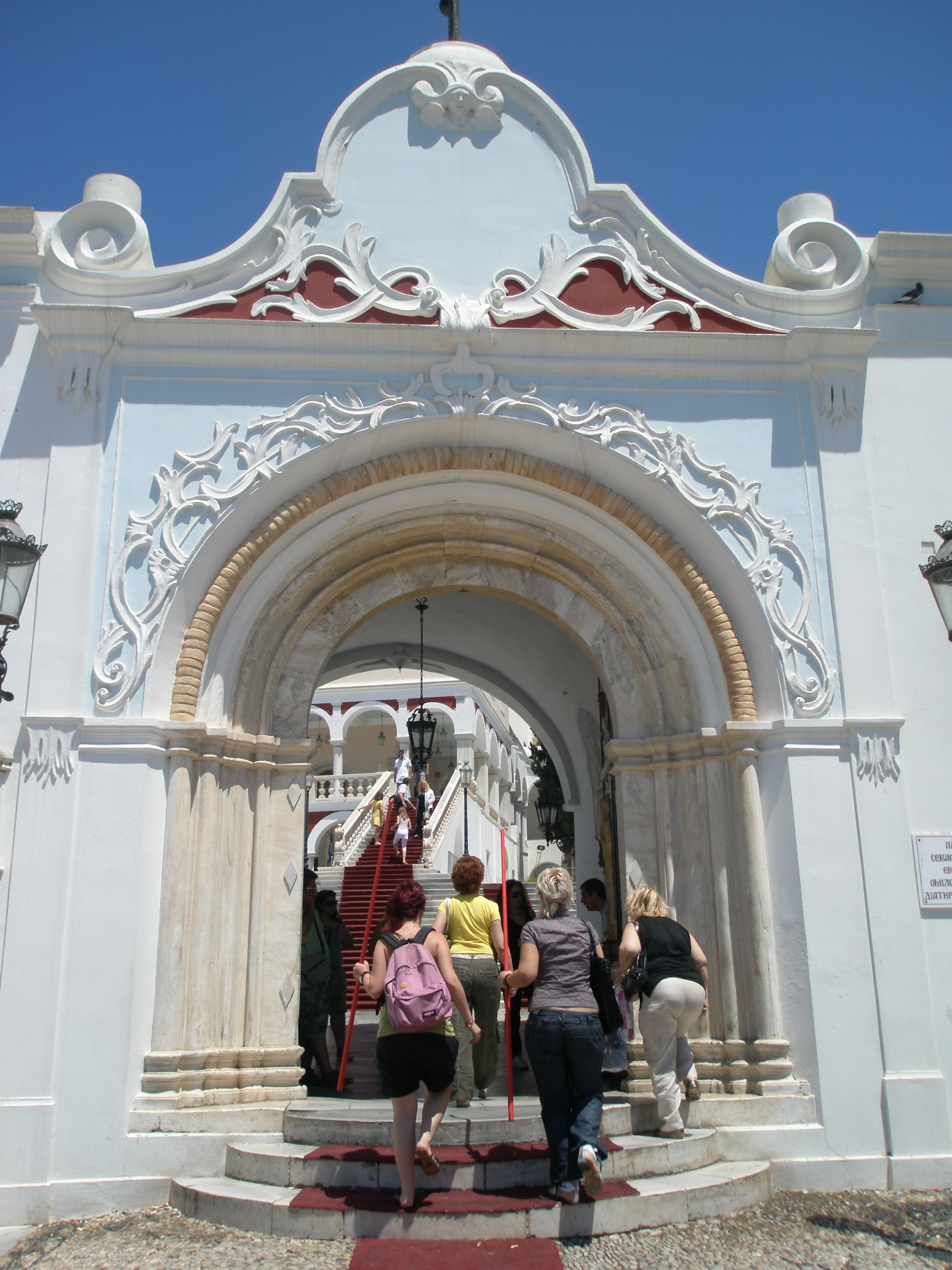
Entrance to the shrine

The church was designed by Efstratios Kalonaris, an architect from Tinos, in the Renaissance Revival style. It is a three-aisled domed basilica, with the transepts separated by arcades with imposing marble columns, with an ornately carved and gilded altar. The facade has two superimposed rows of arches, decorated in the neoclassical style, a bell tower, and two flights of stairs that lead to the main entrance. The church was inaugurated in 1830. Since then it constitutes the major Christian pilgrimage in Greece, akin to Lourdes in France or Fatima in Portugal. The church receives a vast number of donations in silver and gold votives each year; these are auctioned and used for charities.

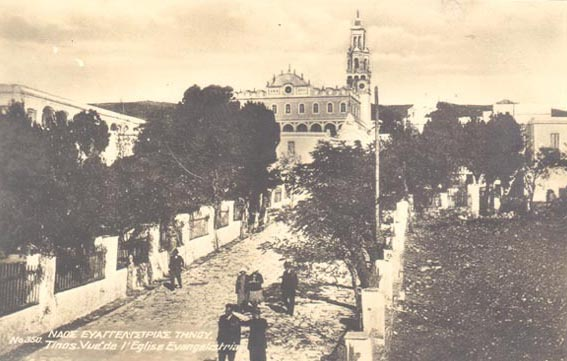
The Church of the Virgin Mary of Tinos in a 1910 epistolary leaflet

=== Later history ===
The second finding of the icon took place on December 18, 1842, according to the Old Church Orthodox calendar in force until 1924 in Greece, corresponding to 31 December in the Julian calendar.

In 1971, the Greek government designated the island of Tinos as sacred due to the Marian observances.

== Icon ==
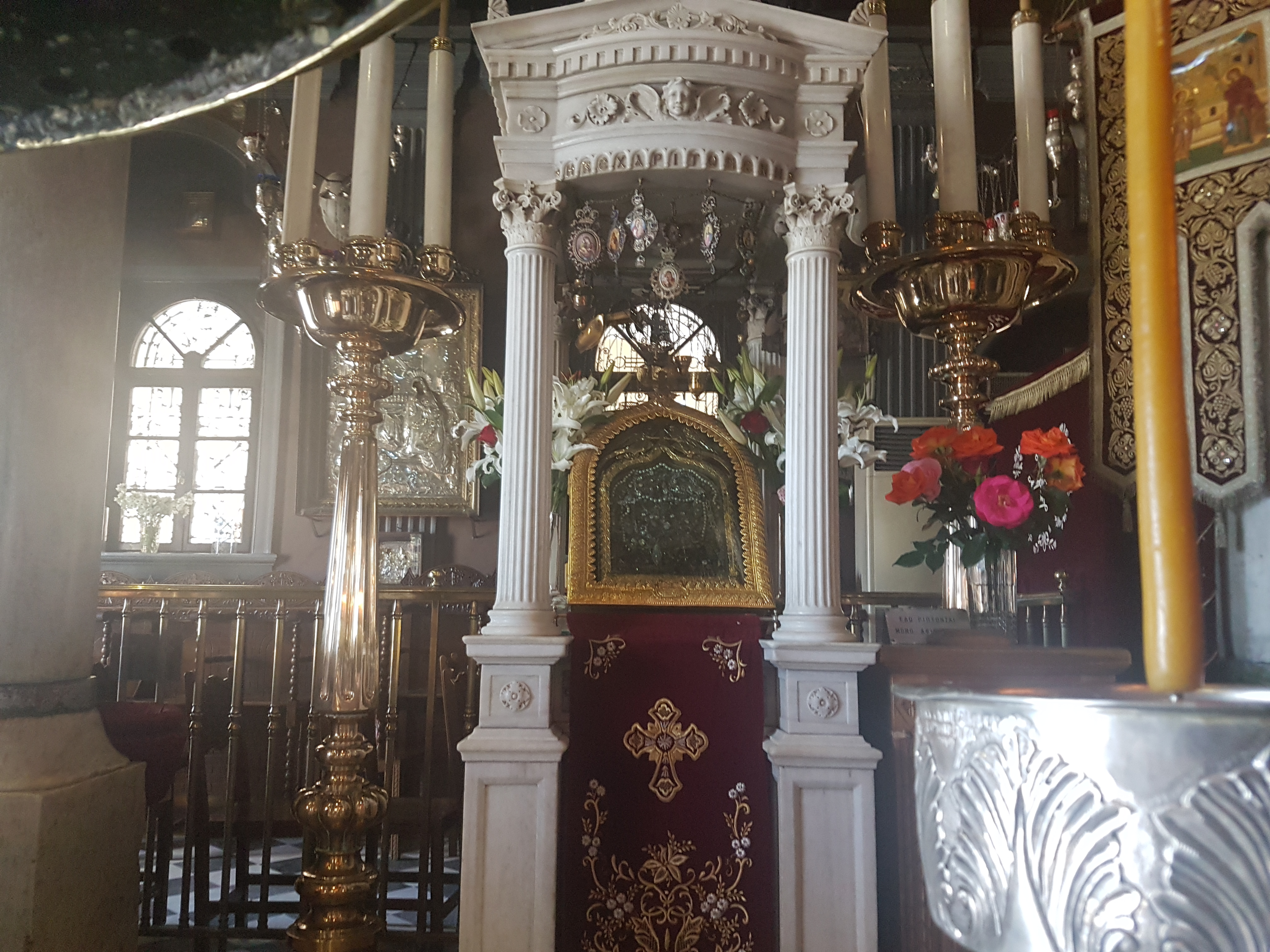
The icon found from the visions of Saint Pelagia

The icon is widely believed to be the source of numerous miracles. Currently, the icon is almost completely encased in silver, gold, and jewels, leaving it essentially impossible to see the original portrayal. The icon is commonly referred to as the Megalócharē ("[She of] Great Grace") or simply the Chárē Tēs ("Her Grace"). By extension the church is often called the same, and is considered a protectress of seafarers and healer of the sick.

== Observances ==
In 2008, it was estimated that about 1 million travelers per year visit the Church of the Virgin Mary on the island.

=== January 30 (Finding of the Icon) ===
January 30 is dedicated to the finding of the icon, and re-enacts its finding. The festival starts on the afternoon of January 29, when the icon is brought from the main church where it is normally housed to the chapel dedicated to the "Life-giving spring" below. There the icon is placed on the site it was found in 1822, where a church service is held. On the 30th, a liturgy is held, and the icon is carried in procession around the town all the way back to the church. Finally, a ceremony is held to celebrate the builders of the church.

=== March 25 (Annunciation) ===
As both the Christian Annunciation and the anniversary of Greek Independence, March 25 was the biggest observance on the island during the 19th century, and was popular amongst pilgrims from Anatolia in the early 20th century. All night prayer services are held.

=== July 23 (Anniversary of Visions) ===
Saint Pelagia's vision of the Virgin Mary is celebrated on July 23 of each year.

=== August 15 (Dormition of the Virgin Mary) ===
The main celebration takes place on August 15 every year (the Dormition of the Virgin Mary), and on this date some Orthodox Christians make a pilgrimage to the icon by crawling all the way to it once they arrive on the island. This follows the strong tradition of the Aegean Islands where the Dormition is grandly celebrated in mid-August as the principal summer feast. Dormition liturgical services are often annually visited by Greek leaders such as the President, Prime Minister, or National Defense Minister.

== See also ==
- Church of Greece
- List of churches in Greece
- Saint Pelagia of Tinos
- Shrines to Mary, mother of Jesus
