= Annunciation of Our Most Holy Lady Church, Riga =

Church in Riga, Latvia

Annunciation of Our Most Holy Lady Church
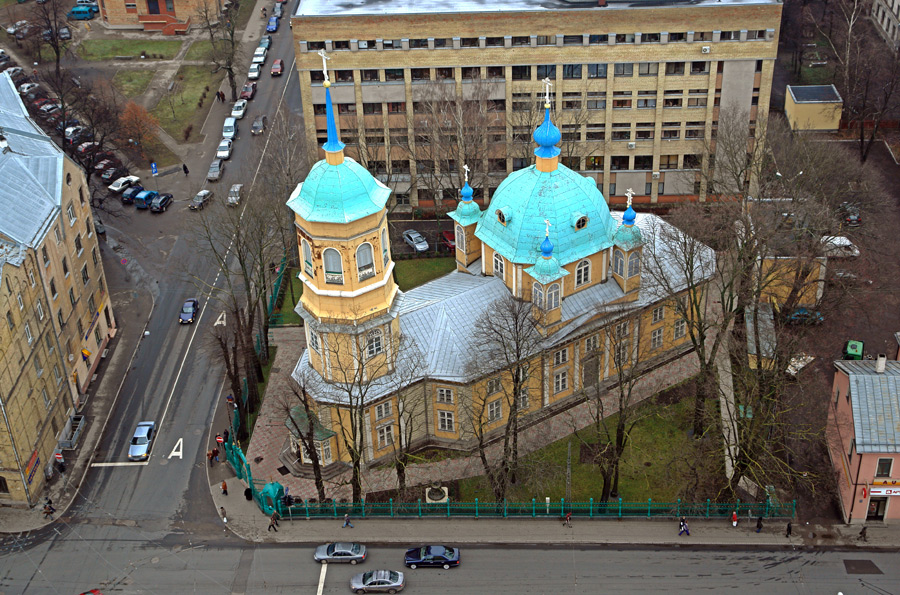

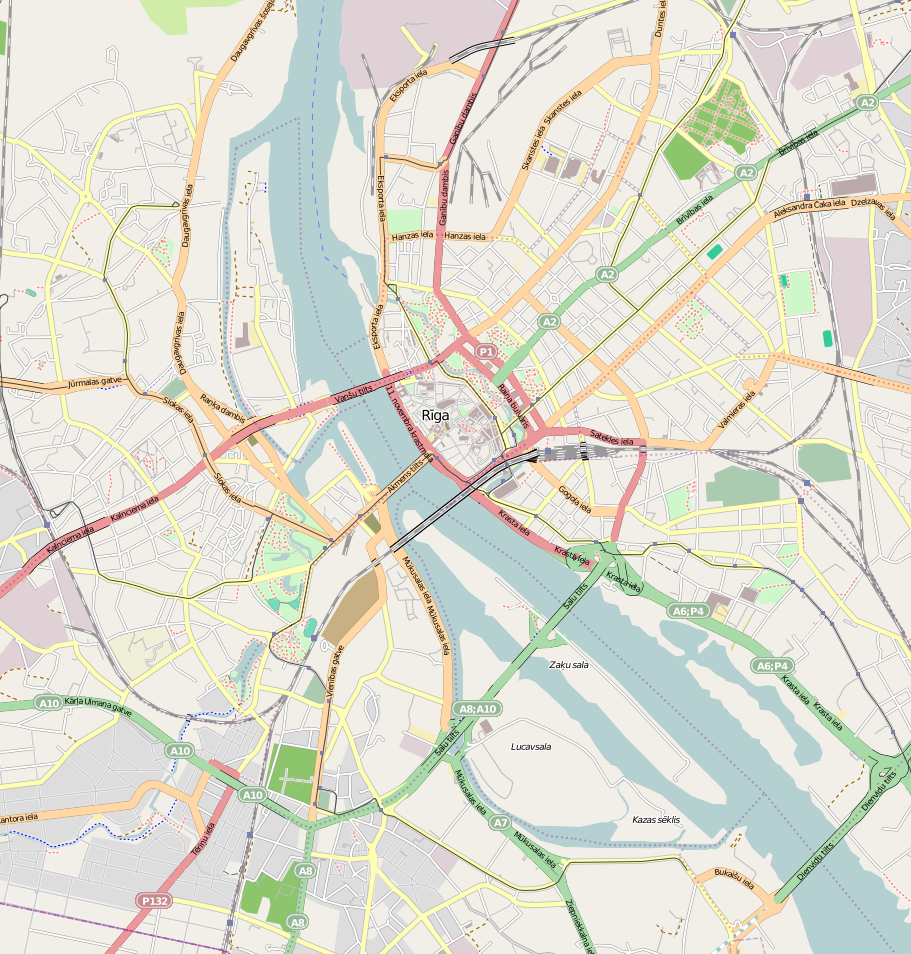
- Location within Riga
- 56°56′38.21″N 24°7′21.27″E
- Location: Riga
- Country: Latvia
- Denomination: Eastern Orthodox

Annunciation of Our Most Holy Lady Church (Latvian: Vissvētās Dievmātes Pasludināšanas pareizticīgo baznīca Russian: Церковь Благовещения Пресвятой Богородицы) is an Orthodox church in Riga, the capital of Latvia. The church is situated at the address 9 Emilijas Benjamiņas Street.
