= Greek Church (Alba Iulia) =

Heritage site in Alba County, Romania

Coordinates: 46°04′25″N 23°34′55″E

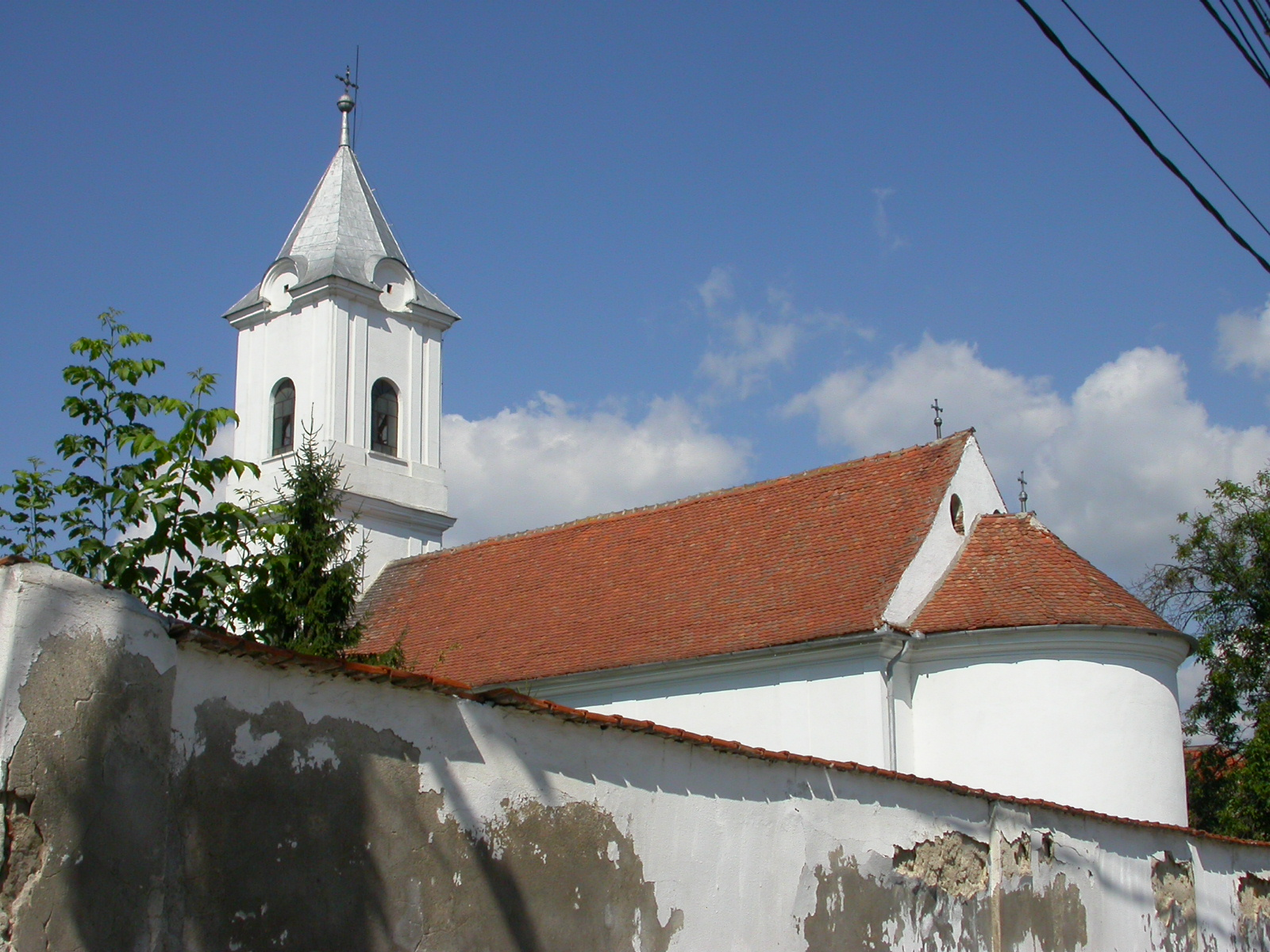
Greek Church

The Greek Church (Romanian: Biserica Grecească) is a Romanian Orthodox church located at 7 Avram Iancu Street, Alba Iulia, Romania. It is dedicated to the Feast of the Annunciation.

The church was built between 1782 and 1794. Its name refers to the Aromanian merchants who contributed to its construction. The need for the church appears linked to the takeover of the Lipoveni Church by Romanian Greek-Catholics. When built, it was situated in a field on the edge of the city; it now has a central position. On the morning of December 1, 1918, Bishop Miron Cristea held an Orthodox service inside the church, before heading to the Great National Assembly of Alba Iulia.

A hall church, it has a detached semicircular apse and a nave in three sections. The bell tower adjoining the western side has two entrances, and harmonizes with the rest of the structure. The interior features a wooden balcony. The impressive iconostasis was painted in the early 19th century by an artist from Abrud and his assistants, using a typical Baroque style. The late-19th century mural painting survives in the altar. Among the church’s possessions are 15 icons painted by a Rășinari artist in 1768, a candleholder and censer donated the same year, another icon from 1783 and two other candleholders from 1794.

The church is listed as a historic monument by Romania's Ministry of Culture and Religious Affairs.
