= Cathedral of the Annunciation =

Annunciation Cathedral or Cathedral of the Annunciation may refer to:

== United States ==
- Cathedral of the Annunciation (Stockton, California)
- Annunciation Cathedral, of the Greek Orthodox Metropolis of San Francisco, California
- Annunciation Cathedral, of the Greek Orthodox Metropolis of Chicago, Illinois
- Annunciation Greek Orthodox Cathedral of New England, Boston, Massachusetts
- Annunciation Melkite Catholic Cathedral, Boston, Massachusetts
- Annunciation Greek Orthodox Cathedral (Houston), Texas

== Elsewhere ==
- Cathedral of the Annunciation, Gospić, Croatia
- Metropolitan Cathedral of Athens, Greece
- Cathedral of the Annunciation of the Blessed Virgin Mary and St Nathy, Ballaghaderreen, Ireland
- Cathedral of the Annunciation, Jerusalem, Israel
- Cathedral of Our Lady of the Annunciation (Catarman), Northern Samar, Philippines
- Cathedral of the Annunciation, Moscow, Russia
- Annunciation Cathedral, Voronezh, Russia
- Annunciation Cathedral, Kharkiv, Ukraine
