= October 9 =

October 9 this year in various calendars
- Friday, 9 October 2026
Akan	Nwonafie
Armenian	21 Sahmi 1476
Aztec	Izcalli 7, 13 Xōchitl
Babylonian	26 Ululu, 2337 SE
Balinese pawukon	Menga, Beteng, Laba, Wage, Aryang, Sukra of Wayang, Indra, Ogan, Pandita
Bengali	24 Ashshin, BS 1433
Chinese	Yang Fire Dragon・Ghost Mansion; Fire Horse Year, Month 8, Day 29 (Hanlu, 14 days until Shuangjiang)
Common Era	9 October 2026 CE
Coptic	29 Thout, AM 1743
Egyptian	26 Mechir, 2775 NE
Ethiopian	29 Maskaram, 2019 Amätä Məhrät
French Republican	Décade II, Septidi de Vendémiaire de l'Année 235 de la République
Gregorian	9 October, AD 2026
Hebrew	28 Tishrei, AM 5787
Hindu	Uttaraphalgunī・Śukla; Solar: 23 Āśvina, 1948 SE; Lunisolar: Caturdaśī, Kṛishna pakṣa of Bhādrapada, 2083 VE; Rāudra・5127 KY・1,872,857
Icelandic	Föstudagur, 16 Haustmánuður 2026
Islamic	26 Rabi' al-thani, AH 1448 (using tabular method)
ISO week date	2026-W41-5
Japanese	29 Hazuki, Reiwa 8 (Kanro, 14 days until Sōkō)
Julian	26 September, AD 2026 (AM 7534)
Julian day	2461323
Korean	29 Dakdal, 4359 DE
Maya	13.0.14.0.0; 13 Yax, 13 Ahau
Roman	ante diem VI Kalendas Octobres, MMDCCLXXIX AUC
Solar Hijri	17 Mehr, SH 1405
Tibetan	29 khrums, me pho rta 2153 or 1772 or 1000

<<	October					>>
Su	Mo	Tu	We	Th	Fr	Sa
				1	2	3
4	5	6	7	8	9	10
11	12	13	14	15	16	17
18	19	20	21	22	23	24
25	26	27	28	29	30	31
2026

October 9 in recent years
2026 (Friday)
2025 (Thursday)
2024 (Wednesday)
2023 (Monday)
2022 (Sunday)
2021 (Saturday)
2020 (Friday)
2019 (Wednesday)
2018 (Tuesday)
2017 (Monday)

October 9 is the 282nd day of the year (283rd in leap years) in the Gregorian calendar; 83 days remain until the end of the year.

== Events ==
=== Pre-1600 ===
- 768 – Carloman I and Charlemagne are crowned kings of the Franks.
- 1238 – James I of Aragon founds the Kingdom of Valencia.
- 1410 – The first known mention of the Prague astronomical clock.
- 1531 – Pressed by a food embargo, the five Catholic cantons of Central Switzerland declare war on the Protestant canton of Zurich, starting the Second War of Kappel.
- 1594 – Troops of the Portuguese Empire are defeated on Sri Lanka, bringing an end to the Campaign of Danture.

=== 1601–1900 ===
- 1604 – Kepler's Supernova is the most recent supernova to be observed within the Milky Way.
- 1635 – Roger Williams is banished from the Massachusetts Bay Colony after religious and policy disagreements.
- 1683 – Allied Imperial and Polish-Lithuanian forces defeat the retreating Ottoman forces in the battle of Parkany.
- 1701 – The Collegiate School of Connecticut (later renamed Yale University) is chartered in Old Saybrook, Connecticut.
- 1708 – Peter the Great defeats the Swedes at the Battle of Lesnaya.
- 1740 – Dutch colonists and Javanese natives begin a massacre of the ethnic Chinese population in Batavia, eventually killing at least 10,000.
- 1760 – Seven Years' War: Russian and Austrian troops briefly occupy Berlin.
- 1779 – American Revolutionary War: A combined Franco-American assault on British defenses during the Siege of Savannah is repulsed with heavy casualties.
- 1790 – A severe earthquake in northern Algeria causes severe damage and a tsunami in the Mediterranean Sea and kills three thousand.
- 1799 – HMS Lutine sinks with the loss of 240 men and a cargo worth £1,200,000.
- 1804 – Hobart, capital of Tasmania, is founded.
- 1806 – Prussia begins the War of the Fourth Coalition against France.
- 1812 – War of 1812: In a naval engagement on Lake Erie, American forces capture two British ships: HMS Detroit and HMS Caledonia.
- 1820 – Guayaquil declares independence from Spain.
- 1825 – Restauration arrives in New York Harbor from Norway, the first organized immigration from Norway to the United States.
- 1831 – Ioannis Kapodistrias, the first head of state of independent Greece, is assassinated.
- 1834 – Opening of the Dublin and Kingstown Railway, the first public railway on the island of Ireland.
- 1847 – Slavery is abolished in the Swedish colony of Saint Barthélemy.
- 1861 – American Civil War: Union troops repel a Confederate attempt to capture Fort Pickens in the Battle of Santa Rosa Island.
- 1864 – American Civil War: Union cavalrymen defeat Confederate forces at Toms Brook, Virginia during Sheridan's Shenandoah Valley campaign.
- 1873 – A meeting at the U.S. Naval Academy establishes the U.S. Naval Institute.
- 1874 – The Universal Postal Union is created by the Treaty of Bern.
- 1900 – The Cook Islands become a territory of the United Kingdom.

=== 1901–present ===
- 1911 – An accidental bomb explosion triggers the Wuchang Uprising against the Qing dynasty, beginning the Xinhai Revolution.
- 1913 – The steamship SS Volturno catches fire in the mid-Atlantic.
- 1914 – World War I: The Siege of Antwerp comes to an end.
- 1918 – The Finnish Parliament elects Prince Frederick Charles of Hesse as King of Finland, but he never accedes to the throne due to Germany's defeat in World War I.
- 1919 – The Cincinnati Reds win the World Series, resulting in the Black Sox Scandal.
- 1934 – A member of the Internal Macedonian Revolutionary Organization, Vlado Chernozemski, kills King Alexander I of Yugoslavia in an assassination organized by the Ustaše, while the French police accidentally kills Louis Barthou, Foreign Minister of France, in Marseille.
- 1936 – Boulder Dam (later Hoover Dam) begins to generate electricity and transmit it to Los Angeles.
- 1937 – Murder of 9 Catholic priests in Zhengding, China, who protected the local population from the advancing Japanese army.
- 1941 – A coup in Panama declares Ricardo Adolfo de la Guardia Arango the new president.
- 1942 – Australia's Statute of Westminster Adoption Act 1942 receives royal assent.
- 1950 – The Goyang Geumjeong Cave massacre in Korea begins.
- 1962 – Uganda becomes an independent Commonwealth realm.
- 1963 – In Italy, a large landslide causes a giant wave to overtop the Vajont Dam, killing over 2,000.
- 1966 – Vietnam War: the Republic of Korea Army commits the Binh Tai Massacre.
- 1967 – A day after his capture, Ernesto "Che" Guevara is executed for attempting to incite a revolution in Bolivia.
- 1969 – In Chicago, the National Guard is called in as demonstrations continue over the trial of the "Chicago Eight".
- 1970 – The Khmer Republic is proclaimed in Cambodia.
- 1980 – Pope John Paul II greets the Dalai Lama during a private audience in Vatican City.
- 1981 – President François Mitterrand abolishes capital punishment in France.
- 1983 – South Korean President Chun Doo-hwan survives an assassination attempt in Rangoon, Burma, but the blast kills 21 and injures 17 others.
- 1984 – The popular children's television show Thomas The Tank Engine & Friends, based on The Railway Series by the Reverend Wilbert Awdry, premieres on ITV.
- 1986 – The Phantom of the Opera, eventually the second longest running musical in London, opens at Her Majesty's Theatre.
- 1986 – Fox Broadcasting Company (FBC) launches as the fourth US television network.
- 1992 – The Peekskill meteorite, a 27.7 pounds (12.6 kg) meteorite crashed into a parked car in Peekskill, New York.
- 1995 – An Amtrak Sunset Limited train is derailed by saboteurs near Palo Verde, Arizona.
- 2006 – North Korea conducts its first nuclear test.
- 2007 – The Dow Jones Industrial Average reaches its all-time high of 14,164 points before rapidly declining due to the 2008 financial crisis.
- 2009 – First lunar impact of NASA's Lunar Precursor Robotic Program.
- 2012 – Pakistani Taliban attempt to assassinate outspoken schoolgirl Malala Yousafzai.
- 2016 – The Arakan Rohingya Salvation Army launches its first attack on Myanmar security forces along the Bangladesh–Myanmar border.
- 2019 – Turkey begins its military offensive in north-eastern Syria.
- 2024 – Hurricane Milton makes landfall in Siesta Key, Florida, as a Category 3 hurricane, causing US$34.3 billion in damage only two weeks after Hurricane Helene impacted the state.

== Births ==
=== Pre-1600 ===
- 1201 – Robert de Sorbon, French minister and theologian, founded the Collège de Sorbonne (died 1274)
- 1221 – Salimbene di Adam, Italian historian and scholar (died 1290)
- 1261 – Denis of Portugal (died 1325)
- 1328 – Peter I of Cyprus (died 1369)
- 1581 – Claude Gaspard Bachet de Méziriac, French mathematician, poet, and scholar (died 1638)
- 1586 – Leopold V, Archduke of Austria (died 1632)
- 1593 – Nicolaes Tulp, Dutch anatomist and politician (died 1674)

=== 1601–1900 ===
- 1609 – Thomas Weston, 4th Earl of Portland, English noble (died 1688)
- 1623 – Ferdinand Verbiest, Flemish Jesuit missionary in China (died 1688)
- 1704 – Johann Andreas Segner, German mathematician, physicist, and physician (died 1777)
- 1757 – Charles X of France (died 1836)
- 1796 – Joseph Bonomi the Younger, British Egyptologist and sculptor (died 1878)
- 1823 – Mary Ann Shadd, American-Canadian abolitionist (died 1893)
- 1826 – Agathon Meurman, Finnish politician and journalist (died 1909)
- 1835 – Camille Saint-Saëns, French composer and conductor (died 1921)
- 1837 – Francis Wayland Parker, American theorist and academic (died 1902)
- 1840 – Simeon Solomon, English painter (died 1905)
- 1845 – Carl Gustav Thulin, Swedish shipowner (died 1918)
- 1850 – Hermann von Ihering, German-Brazilian zoologist (died 1930)
- 1852 – Hermann Emil Fischer, German chemist and academic, Nobel Prize laureate (died 1919)
- 1858 – Mihajlo Pupin, Serbian-American physicist and chemist (died 1935)
- 1859 – Alfred Dreyfus, French colonel (died 1935)
- 1863 – Edward Bok, Dutch-American journalist and author (died 1930)
- 1864 – Reginald Dyer, British brigadier general (died 1927)
- 1871 – Georges Gauthier, Canadian archbishop (died 1940)
- 1873 – Carl Flesch, Hungarian violinist and educator (died 1944)
- 1873 – Karl Schwarzschild, German physicist and astronomer (died 1916)
- 1873 – Charles Rudolph Walgreen, American pharmacist and businessman, founded Walgreens (died 1939)
- 1874 – Nicholas Roerich, Russian archaeologist and painter (died 1947)
- 1877 – Gopabandhu Das, Indian journalist, poet, and activist (died 1928)
- 1879 – Max von Laue, German physicist and academic, Nobel Prize laureate (died 1960)
- 1880 – Charlie Faust, American baseball player (died 1915)
- 1883 – Maria Filotti, Greek-Romanian actress (died 1956)
- 1886 – Rube Marquard, American baseball player and manager (died 1980)
- 1888 – Nikolai Bukharin, Russian journalist and politician (died 1938)
- 1888 – Irving Cummings, American actor, director, producer, and screenwriter (died 1959)
- 1890 – Aimee Semple McPherson, Canadian-American evangelist, founded the International Church of the Foursquare Gospel (died 1944)
- 1892 – Ivo Andrić, Yugoslav novelist, poet, and short story writer, Nobel Prize laureate (died 1975)
- 1893 – Mário de Andrade, Brazilian author, poet, and photographer (died 1945)
- 1895 – Eugene Bullard, American pilot (died 1961)
- 1897 – M. Bhaktavatsalam, Indian lawyer and politician, 6th Chief Minister of Madras State (died 1987)
- 1898 – Tawfiq al-Hakim, Egyptian author and playwright (died 1987)
- 1898 – Joe Sewell, American baseball player (died 1990)
- 1899 – Bruce Catton, American historian and author (died 1978)
- 1900 – Joseph Friedman, American inventor (died 1982)
- 1900 – Alastair Sim, Scottish-English actor and academic (died 1976)
- 1900 – Joseph Zubin, Lithuanian-American psychologist and academic (died 1990)

=== 1901–present ===
- 1901 – Alice Lee Jemison, Seneca political activist and journalist (died 1964)
- 1902 – Freddie Young, English cinematographer (died 1998)
- 1903 – Walter O'Malley, American lawyer and businessman (died 1979)
- 1906 – J. R. Eyerman, American photographer and journalist (died 1985)
- 1906 – Léopold Sédar Senghor, Senegalese poet and politician, 1st President of Senegal (died 2001)
- 1907 – Quintin Hogg, Baron Hailsham of St Marylebone, English academic and politician, Lord High Chancellor of Great Britain (died 2001)
- 1907 – Jacques Tati, French actor, director, and screenwriter (died 1982)
- 1907 – Horst Wessel, German SA officer (died 1930)
- 1908 – Harry Hooton, Australian poet and critic (died 1961)
- 1908 – Werner von Haeften, German lieutenant (died 1944)
- 1908 – Lee Wiley, American jazz singer, and lyricist (died 1975)
- 1909 – Donald Coggan, English archbishop (died 2000)
- 1911 – Joe Rosenthal, American photographer (died 2006)
- 1914 – Edward Andrews, American actor (died 1985)
- 1915 – Clifford M. Hardin, American academic and politician, 17th United States Secretary of Agriculture (died 2010)
- 1915 – Belva Plain, American author (died 2010)
- 1918 – E. Howard Hunt, American CIA officer and author (died 2007)
- 1918 – Charles Read, Australian air marshal (died 2014)
- 1918 – Bebo Valdés, Cuban-Swedish pianist, composer, and bandleader (died 2013)
- 1920 – Jens Bjørneboe, Norwegian author and educator (died 1976)
- 1920 – Yusef Lateef, American saxophonist, composer, and educator (died 2013)
- 1920 – Jason Wingreen, American actor and screenwriter (died 2015)
- 1921 – Michel Boisrond, French director and screenwriter (died 2002)
- 1921 – Tadeusz Różewicz, Polish poet and playwright (died 2014)
- 1922 – Léon Dion, Canadian political scientist and academic (died 1997)
- 1922 – Fyvush Finkel, American actor (died 2016)
- 1922 – Olga Guillot, Cuban-American singer (died 2010)
- 1923 – Donald Sinden, English actor (died 2014)
- 1924 – Immanuvel Devendrar, Indian soldier (died 1957)
- 1924 – Arnie Risen, American basketball player (died 2012)
- 1926 – Danièle Delorme, French actress and producer (died 2015)
- 1927 – John Margetson, English scholar and diplomat, British Ambassador to the Netherlands (died 2020)
- 1928 – Einojuhani Rautavaara, Finnish composer and educator (died 2016)
- 1931 – Tony Booth, English actor (died 2017)
- 1933 – Peter Mansfield, English physicist and academic, Nobel Prize laureate (died 2017)
- 1933 – Melvin Sokolsky, American fashion photographer (died 2022)
- 1933 – Bill Tidy, English soldier and cartoonist (died 2023)
- 1934 – Jill Ker Conway, Australian historian and author (died 2018)
- 1934 – Abdullah Ibrahim, South African pianist and composer (died 2026)
- 1935 – Prince Edward, Duke of Kent
- 1935 – Don McCullin, English photographer and journalist
- 1936 – Brian Blessed, English actor
- 1936 – Mick Young, Australian politician (died 1996)
- 1938 – Heinz Fischer, Austrian academic and politician, 11th President of Austria
- 1939 – Nicholas Grimshaw, English architect and academic (died 2025)
- 1939 – John Pilger, Australian-English journalist, director, and producer (died 2023)
- 1939 – O. V. Wright, American soul singer (died 1980)
- 1940 – John Lennon, English singer-songwriter, guitarist, and producer (died 1980)
- 1941 – Brian Lamb, American broadcaster, founded C-SPAN
- 1941 – Trent Lott, American lawyer and politician
- 1941 – Omali Yeshitela, political activist and founder of the Uhuru Movement
- 1943 – Douglas Kirby, American psychologist and author (died 2012)
- 1943 – Mike Peters, American cartoonist
- 1944 – Rita Donaghy, Baroness Donaghy, English academic and politician
- 1944 – John Entwistle, English singer-songwriter, bass player, and producer (died 2002)
- 1944 – Nona Hendryx, American singer-songwriter, producer, and actress
- 1945 – Amjad Ali Khan, Indian classical Sarod player
- 1945 – Taiguara, Uruguayan-Brazilian singer-songwriter (died 1996)
- 1947 – France Gall, French singer (died 2018)
- 1948 – Jackson Browne, American singer-songwriter and guitarist
- 1949 – Rod Temperton, English keyboard player, songwriter, and producer (died 2016)
- 1950 – Yoshiyuki Konishi, Japanese fashion designer
- 1950 – Reichi Nakaido, Japanese singer and guitarist
- 1950 – Jody Williams, American academic and activist, Nobel Prize laureate
- 1951 – Robert Wuhl, American actor, comedian, and writer
- 1952 – Sharon Osbourne, English television host and manager
- 1952 – Dennis Stratton, English singer-songwriter and guitarist
- 1953 – Sally Burgess, South African-English soprano and educator
- 1953 – Hank Pfister, American tennis player
- 1953 – Tony Shalhoub, American actor and producer
- 1954 – Scott Bakula, American actor
- 1954 – James Fearnley, English musician
- 1954 – Rubén Magnano, Argentine-Italian basketball coach
- 1954 – John O'Hurley, American actor and game show host
- 1955 – Linwood Boomer, Canadian actor, producer, and screenwriter
- 1955 – Steve Ovett, English runner and sportscaster
- 1957 – Ini Kamoze, Jamaican singer-songwriter
- 1958 – Al Jourgensen, Cuban-American singer-songwriter and producer
- 1958 – Michael Paré, American actor
- 1958 – Mike Singletary, American football player and coach
- 1959 – Boris Nemtsov, Russian academic and politician, First Deputy Prime Minister of Russia (died 2015)
- 1960 – Kenny Garrett, American saxophonist and composer
- 1961 – Julian Bailey, English racing driver and sportscaster
- 1961 – Kurt Neumann, American singer-songwriter and guitarist
- 1962 – Jorge Burruchaga, Argentinian footballer and manager
- 1962 – Paul Radisich, New Zealand racing driver
- 1962 – Ōnokuni Yasushi, Japanese sumo wrestler, the 62nd Yokozuna
- 1963 – Andy Platt, English rugby league player
- 1964 – Guillermo del Toro, Mexican-American director, producer, and screenwriter
- 1964 – Martín Jaite, Argentine tennis player
- 1966 – David Cameron, English politician, Prime Minister of the United Kingdom
- 1966 – Christopher Östlund, Swedish publisher, founded Plaza Magazine
- 1967 – Carling Bassett-Seguso, Canadian tennis player
- 1967 – Eddie Guerrero, American wrestler (died 2005)
- 1967 – Gheorghe Popescu, Romanian footballer
- 1968 – Guto Bebb, Welsh businessman and politician
- 1968 – Anbumani Ramadoss, Indian politician
- 1969 – Darren Britt, Australian rugby league player
- 1969 – Simon Fairweather, Australian archer
- 1969 – PJ Harvey, English musician, singer-songwriter, writer, poet, and composer
- 1969 – Christine Hough, Canadian figure skater and coach
- 1969 – Giles Martin, English songwriter and producer
- 1969 – Steve McQueen, English director, producer, and screenwriter
- 1970 – Kenny Anderson, American basketball player and coach
- 1970 – Steve Jablonsky, American composer
- 1970 – Annika Sörenstam, Swedish golfer and architect
- 1971 – Wayne Bartrim, Australian rugby league player and coach
- 1971 – Sian Evans, Welsh singer
- 1972 – Anabela Sousa Rodrigues, Portuguese politician and psychologist
- 1973 – Steve Burns, American actor, television host and musician
- 1973 – Fabio Lione, Italian singer-songwriter and keyboard player
- 1974 – Keith Booth, American basketball player and coach
- 1974 – Shmuel Herzfeld, American rabbi
- 1975 – Haylie Ecker, Australian violinist
- 1975 – Sean Lennon, American singer-songwriter, guitarist, producer, and actor
- 1975 – Mark Viduka, Australian footballer
- 1976 – William Alexander, American author and educator
- 1976 – Stephen Neal, American football player
- 1976 – Lee Peacock, Scottish footballer and coach
- 1976 – Özlem Türköne, Turkish journalist and politician
- 1976 – Nick Swardson, American actor and comedian
- 1977 – Emanuele Belardi, Italian footballer
- 1977 – Brian Roberts, American baseball player
- 1978 – Nicky Byrne, Irish singer-songwriter
- 1978 – Juan Dixon, American basketball player and coach
- 1979 – Vernon Fox, American football player and coach
- 1979 – Alex Greenwald, American singer-songwriter, producer, and actor
- 1979 – Todd Kelly, Australian racing driver
- 1979 – Lecrae, American rapper, singer, songwriter, record producer, and actor
- 1979 – Chris O'Dowd, Irish actor, producer, and screenwriter
- 1979 – Brandon Routh, American model and actor
- 1979 – Gonzalo Sorondo, Uruguayan footballer
- 1980 – Lucy Akello, Ugandan social worker and politician
- 1980 – Filip Bobek, Polish actor
- 1980 – Sarah Lovell, Australian politician
- 1980 – Thami Tsolekile, South African cricketer
- 1980 – Henrik Zetterberg, Swedish ice hockey player
- 1981 – Zachery Ty Bryan, American actor
- 1981 – Darius Miles, American basketball player
- 1983 – Farhaan Behardien, South African cricketer
- 1983 – Trevor Daley, Canadian ice hockey player
- 1983 – Stephen Gionta, American ice hockey player
- 1983 – Spencer Grammer, American actress
- 1983 – Jang Mi-ran, South Korean weightlifter
- 1983 – Andreas Zuber, Austrian racing driver
- 1984 – Marie Kondo, Japanese author and television presenter
- 1985 – David Plummer, American swimmer
- 1986 – Derek Holland, American baseball player
- 1986 – Laure Manaudou, French swimmer
- 1986 – David Phelps, American baseball player
- 1986 – Jan Christian Vestre, Norwegian businessman and politician
- 1986 – Stephane Zubar, French footballer
- 1987 – Craig Brackins, American basketball player
- 1987 – Samantha Murray Sharan, British tennis player
- 1987 – Henry Walker, American basketball player
- 1988 – Starling Marte, Dominican baseball player
- 1988 – David Tyrrell, Australian rugby league player
- 1989 – Russell Packer, New Zealand rugby league player
- 1990 – Kevin Kampl, German-Slovene footballer
- 1990 – Jake Lamb, American baseball player
- 1992 – Jerian Grant, American basketball player
- 1992 – Sam Mewis, American soccer player
- 1992 – Tyler James Williams, American actor
- 1992 – Kyle Gordon, American musician and comedian
- 1993 – Ani Amiraghyan, Armenian tennis player
- 1993 – Lauren Davis, American tennis player
- 1993 – Jayden Hodges, Australian rugby league player
- 1993 – George Kittle, American football player
- 1993 – Scotty McCreery, American singer and songwriter
- 1993 – Wesley So, Filipino-American chess grandmaster
- 1994 – Jodelle Ferland, Canadian actress
- 1996 – Jacob Batalon, Filipino-American actor
- 1996 – Bella Hadid, American model
- 1997 – Jharrel Jerome, American actor
- 1997 – Megan Moroney, American singer-songwriter.
- 2000 – Penei Sewell, American football player
- 2001 – Kyla Leibel, Canadian swimmer
- 2002 – Ben Shelton, American tennis player

== Deaths ==
=== Pre-1600 ===
- 680 – Ghislain, Frankish anchorite and saint
- 892 – Al-Tirmidhi, Persian scholar and hadith compiler (born 824)
- 1047 – Pope Clement II
- 1212 – Philip I of Namur, Marquis of Namur (born 1175)
- 1253 – Robert Grosseteste, English bishop and philosopher (born 1175)
- 1273 – Elisabeth of Bavaria, Queen of Germany (born 1227)
- 1296 – Louis III, Duke of Bavaria (born 1269)
- 1390 – John I of Castile (born 1358)
- 1555 – Justus Jonas, German academic and reformer (born 1493)
- 1562 – Gabriele Falloppio, Italian anatomist and physician (born 1523)
- 1569 – Vladimir of Staritsa (born 1533)
- 1581 – Louis Bertrand, Spanish missionary and saint (born 1526)

=== 1601–1900 ===
- 1613 – Henry Constable, English poet (born 1562)
- 1619 – Joseph Pardo, Italian rabbi and merchant (born 1561)
- 1691 – William Sacheverell, English politician (born 1638)
- 1729 – Richard Blackmore, English physician and poet (born 1654)
- 1793 – Jean Joseph Marie Amiot, French missionary and linguist (born 1718)
- 1797 – Vilna Gaon, Lithuanian rabbi and scholar (born 1720)
- 1806 – Benjamin Banneker, American astronomer and surveyor (born 1731)
- 1808 – John Claiborne, American lawyer and politician (born 1777)
- 1831 – Ioannis Kapodistrias, Russian-Greek lawyer and politician, Governor of Greece (born 1776)
- 1873 – George Ormerod, English historian and author (born 1785)
- 1897 – Jan Heemskerk, Dutch lawyer and politician, Prime Minister of the Netherlands (born 1818)
- 1900 – Heinrich von Herzogenberg, Austrian composer and conductor (born 1843)

=== 1901–present ===
- 1906 – Henriette Wulfsberg, Norwegian school owner and writer (born 1843)
- 1911 – Jack Daniel, American businessman, founded Jack Daniel's (born 1849)
- 1924 – Valery Bryusov, Russian author, poet, and critic (born 1873)
- 1926 – Evald Relander, Finnish teacher, agronomist and banker (born 1856)
- 1934 – Alexander I of Yugoslavia, King of Yugoslavia also known as Alexander the Unifier (born 1888)
- 1934 – Louis Barthou, French union leader and politician, 78th Prime Minister of France (born 1862)
- 1937 – Ernest Louis, Grand Duke of Hesse (born 1868)
- 1940 – Wilfred Grenfell, English-American physician and missionary (born 1865)
- 1941 – Helen Morgan, American singer and actress (born 1900)
- 1943 – Pieter Zeeman, Dutch physicist and academic, Nobel Prize laureate (born 1865)
- 1944 – Stefanina Moro, Italian partisan (born 1927)
- 1945 – Gottlieb Hering, German captain (born 1887)
- 1946 – Frank Castleman, American football player, baseball player, and coach (born 1877)
- 1947 – Yukio Sakurauchi, Japanese businessman and politician, 27th Japanese Minister of Finance (born 1888)
- 1950 – George Hainsworth, Canadian ice hockey player and politician (born 1895)
- 1953 – James Finlayson, Scottish-American actor (born 1887)
- 1955 – Theodor Innitzer, Austrian cardinal (born 1875)
- 1956 – Marie Doro, American actress (born 1882)
- 1958 – Pope Pius XII (born 1876)
- 1958 – John Boland, American politician (born 1884)
- 1959 – Shirō Ishii, Japanese general and biologist (born 1892)
- 1962 – Milan Vidmar, Slovenian chess player and engineer (born 1885)
- 1967 – Che Guevara, Argentinian-Cuban physician, politician and guerrilla leader (born 1928)
- 1967 – Cyril Norman Hinshelwood, English chemist and academic, Nobel Prize laureate (born 1897)
- 1967 – André Maurois, French soldier and author (born 1885)
- 1967 – Joseph Pilates, German-American fitness trainer, developed Pilates (born 1883)
- 1969 – Don Hoak, American baseball player (born 1928)
- 1972 – Miriam Hopkins, American actress (born 1902)
- 1974 – Oskar Schindler, Czech-German businessman (born 1908)
- 1975 – Noon Meem Rashid, Pakistani poet (born 1910)
- 1976 – Walter Warlimont, German general (born 1894)
- 1978 – Jacques Brel, Belgian singer-songwriter and actor (born 1929)
- 1982 – Herbert Meinhard Mühlpfordt, German historian and physician (born 1893)
- 1985 – Emílio Garrastazu Médici, Brazilian general and politician, 28th President of Brazil (born 1905)
- 1987 – Clare Boothe Luce, American author, playwright, and diplomat, United States Ambassador to Italy (born 1903)
- 1987 – William P. Murphy, American physician and academic, Nobel Prize laureate (born 1892)
- 1988 – Felix Wankel, German engineer, invented the Wankel engine (born 1902)
- 1989 – Yusuf Atılgan, Turkish author and playwright (born 1921)
- 1989 – Penny Lernoux, American journalist and author (born 1940)
- 1995 – Alec Douglas-Home, British cricketer and politician, Prime Minister of the United Kingdom (born 1903)
- 1996 – Walter Kerr, American author, composer, and critic (born 1913)
- 1999 – Milt Jackson, American vibraphone player and composer (born 1923)
- 1999 – Akhtar Hameed Khan, Pakistani economist and scholar (born 1914)
- 2000 – David Dukes, American actor (born 1945)
- 2000 – Patrick Anthony Porteous, Indian-Scottish colonel, Victoria Cross recipient (born 1918)
- 2001 – Herbert Ross, American director, producer, and choreographer (born 1927)
- 2002 – Sopubek Begaliev, Kyrgyzstani economist and politician (born 1931)
- 2002 – Charles Guggenheim, American director, producer, and screenwriter (born 1924)
- 2003 – Carolyn Gold Heilbrun, American author and academic (born 1926)
- 2003 – Carl Fontana, American jazz trombonist (born 1928)
- 2004 – Jacques Derrida, Algerian-French philosopher and academic (born 1930)
- 2005 – Louis Nye, American actor (born 1913)
- 2006 – Danièle Huillet, French filmmaker (born 1933)
- 2006 – Paul Hunter, English snooker player (born 1978)
- 2006 – Kanshi Ram, Indian lawyer and politician (born 1934)
- 2007 – Enrico Banducci, American businessman, founded hungry i (born 1922)
- 2007 – Carol Bruce, American actress and singer (born 1919)
- 2009 – Stuart M. Kaminsky, American author and educator (born 1934)
- 2009 – John Daido Loori, American Zen Buddhist monastic and teacher (born 1931)
- 2009 – Horst Szymaniak, German footballer (born 1934)
- 2010 – Maurice Allais, French economist and physicist, Nobel Prize laureate (born 1911)
- 2011 – Pavel Karelin, Russian ski jumper (born 1989)
- 2012 – Sammi Kane Kraft, American actress (born 1992)
- 2012 – Kenny Rollins, American basketball player (born 1923)
- 2012 – Harris Savides, American cinematographer (born 1957)
- 2013 – Solomon Lar, Nigerian educator and politician, 4th Governor of Plateau State (born 1933)
- 2013 – Srihari, Indian actor (born 1964)
- 2013 – Wilfried Martens, Belgian lawyer and politician, 60th Prime Minister of Belgium (born 1936)
- 2013 – Edmund Niziurski, Polish sociologist, lawyer, and author (born 1925)
- 2014 – Boris Buzančić, Croatian actor and politician, 47th Mayor of Zagreb (born 1929)
- 2014 – Jan Hooks, American actress and comedienne (born 1957)
- 2014 – Carolyn Kizer, American poet and academic (born 1925)
- 2014 – Peter A. Peyser, American soldier and politician (born 1921)
- 2014 – Rita Shane, American soprano and educator (born 1936)
- 2015 – Ray Duncan, American businessman (born 1930)
- 2015 – Richard F. Heck, American chemist and academic, Nobel Prize laureate (born 1931)
- 2015 – Geoffrey Howe, Welsh lawyer and politician, Deputy Prime Minister of the United Kingdom (born 1926)
- 2015 – Ravindra Jain, Indian composer and director (born 1944)
- 2016 – Andrzej Wajda, Polish film and theatre director (born 1926)
- 2017 – Jean Rochefort, French actor (born 1930)
- 2024 – George Baldock, British-born Greek international footballer (born 1993)
- 2024 – Dieter Burdenski, German footballer (born 1950)
- 2024 – Lily Ebert, Hungarian-born Holocaust survivor (born 1923)
- 2024 – Lee Wei Ling, Singaporean neurologist (born 1955)
- 2024 – Clark R. Rasmussen, American politician (born 1934)
- 2024 – Leif Segerstam, Finnish conductor and composer (born 1944)
- 2024 – Ratan Tata, Indian businessman and philanthropist (born 1937)
- 2026 – Mike Ditka, American football coach and tight end for the Chicago Bears (born 1939)

== Holidays and observances ==
- Christian feast day:
  - Abraham
  - Denis of Paris
  - Dionysius the Areopagite
  - Ghislain
  - Gunther of Bohemia
  - Innocencio of Mary Immaculate and Martyrs of Turon
  - John Henry Newman
  - John Leonardi
  - Luis Beltran
  - Robert Grosseteste (Church of England)
  - Wilfred Grenfell (Episcopal Church in the United States)
  - October 9 (Eastern Orthodox liturgics)
- Fire Prevention Day (Canada, United States)
- Hangul Day (South Korea)
- Independence Day, celebrates the independence of Uganda from United Kingdom in 1962. (Uganda)
- Independence of Guayaquil from Spain in 1820 (Ecuador)
- Leif Erikson Day (United States, Iceland and Norway)
- National Day of Commemorating the Holocaust (Romania)
- National Nanotechnology Day (United States)
- Takayama Autumn Festival (Takayama, Japan)
- World Post Day
- Indian Foreign Service Day
