= Seleucid era =

Calendar era used during Hellenistic period

Today (at UTC+00)
- Friday, 9 October 2026
- Babylonian: 26 Ululu, 2337 SE
Other calendars
Akan	Nwonafie
Armenian	21 Sahmi 1476
Aztec	Izcalli 7, 13 Xōchitl
Balinese pawukon	Menga, Beteng, Laba, Wage, Aryang, Sukra of Wayang, Indra, Ogan, Pandita
Bengali	24 Ashshin, BS 1433
Chinese	Yang Fire Dragon・Ghost Mansion; Fire Horse Year, Month 8, Day 29 (Hanlu, 14 days until Shuangjiang)
Common Era	9 October 2026 CE
Coptic	29 Thout, AM 1743
Egyptian	26 Mechir, 2775 NE
Ethiopian	29 Maskaram, 2019 Amätä Məhrät
French Republican	Décade II, Septidi de Vendémiaire de l'Année 235 de la République
Gregorian	9 October, AD 2026
Hebrew	28 Tishrei, AM 5787
Hindu	Uttaraphalgunī・Śukla; Solar: 23 Āśvina, 1948 SE; Lunisolar: Caturdaśī, Kṛishna pakṣa of Bhādrapada, 2083 VE; Rāudra・5127 KY・1,872,857
Icelandic	Föstudagur, 16 Haustmánuður 2026
Islamic	26 Rabi' al-thani, AH 1448 (using tabular method)
ISO week date	2026-W41-5
Japanese	29 Hazuki, Reiwa 8 (Kanro, 14 days until Sōkō)
Julian	26 September, AD 2026 (AM 7534)
Julian day	2461323
Korean	29 Dakdal, 4359 DE
Maya	13.0.14.0.0; 13 Yax, 13 Ahau
Roman	ante diem VI Kalendas Octobres, MMDCCLXXIX AUC
Solar Hijri	17 Mehr, SH 1405
Tibetan	29 khrums, me pho rta 2153 or 1772 or 1000

The Seleucid era ("SE") or Anno Graecorum (literally "year of the Greeks" or "Greek year"), sometimes denoted "AG," was a system of numbering years in use by the Seleucid Empire and other countries among the ancient Hellenistic civilizations, and later by the Parthians. It is sometimes referred to as "the dominion of the Seleucidæ," or the Year of Alexander. The era dates from Seleucus I Nicator's reconquest of Babylon in 312/11 BC after his exile in Ptolemaic Egypt, considered by Seleucus and his court to mark the founding of the Seleucid Empire. According to Jewish tradition, it was during the sixth year of Alexander the Great's reign (lege: possibly Alexander the Great's infant son, Alexander IV of Macedon) that they began to make use of this counting.

== Versions ==
Two different variations of the Seleucid years existed, one where the year started in spring and another where it starts in autumn:

1. The natives of the empire used the Babylonian calendar, in which the new year falls on 1 Nisanu (3 April in 311 BC), so in this system year 1 of the Seleucid era corresponds roughly to April 311 BC to March 310 BC. This included the inhabitants of Coele-Syria, notably the Jews who call it the Era of Contracts (Hebrew: מניין שטרות, romanized: minyān shəṭarōṯ).
2. The Macedonian court adopted the Babylonian calendar (substituting the Macedonian month names) but reckoned the new year to be in the autumn (the exact date is unknown). In this system year 1 of the Seleucid era corresponds to the period from autumn 312 BC to summer 311 BC. By the 7th century AD / 10th AG, the west Syrian Christians settled on 1 October-to-30 September. Jews, however, reckon the start of each new Seleucid year with the lunar month Tishri.

These differences in the beginning of the year mean that dates differ by one if they fall between spring and autumn. Notably, the Jewish historical book 1 Maccabees generally uses the Babylonian and Judean year count (1 Maccabees 6:20, 1 Maccabees 7:1, 9:3, 10:1, etc.). However, the book 2 Maccabees exclusively uses the Macedonian version of the calendar, likely because it was written in either Cyprus or Egypt. Elias Bickerman gives this example:

For instance, the restoration of the temple of Jerusalem by Judas Maccabaeus, approximately 15 December 164 BC, fell in the year 148 of the Seleucid Era according to Jewish (and Babylonian) calculation, but in the year 149 for the court.

== Later usage ==
Anno Graecorum
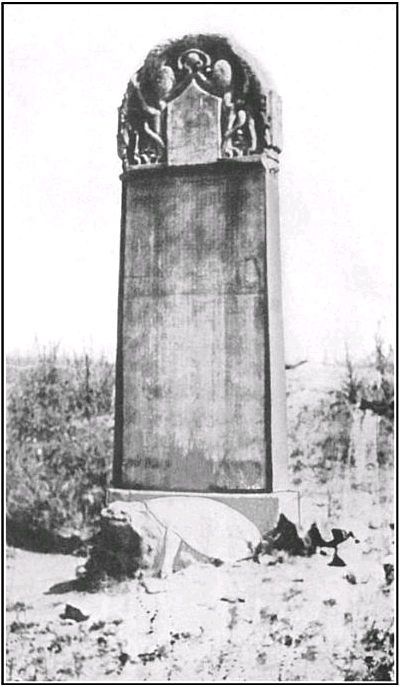
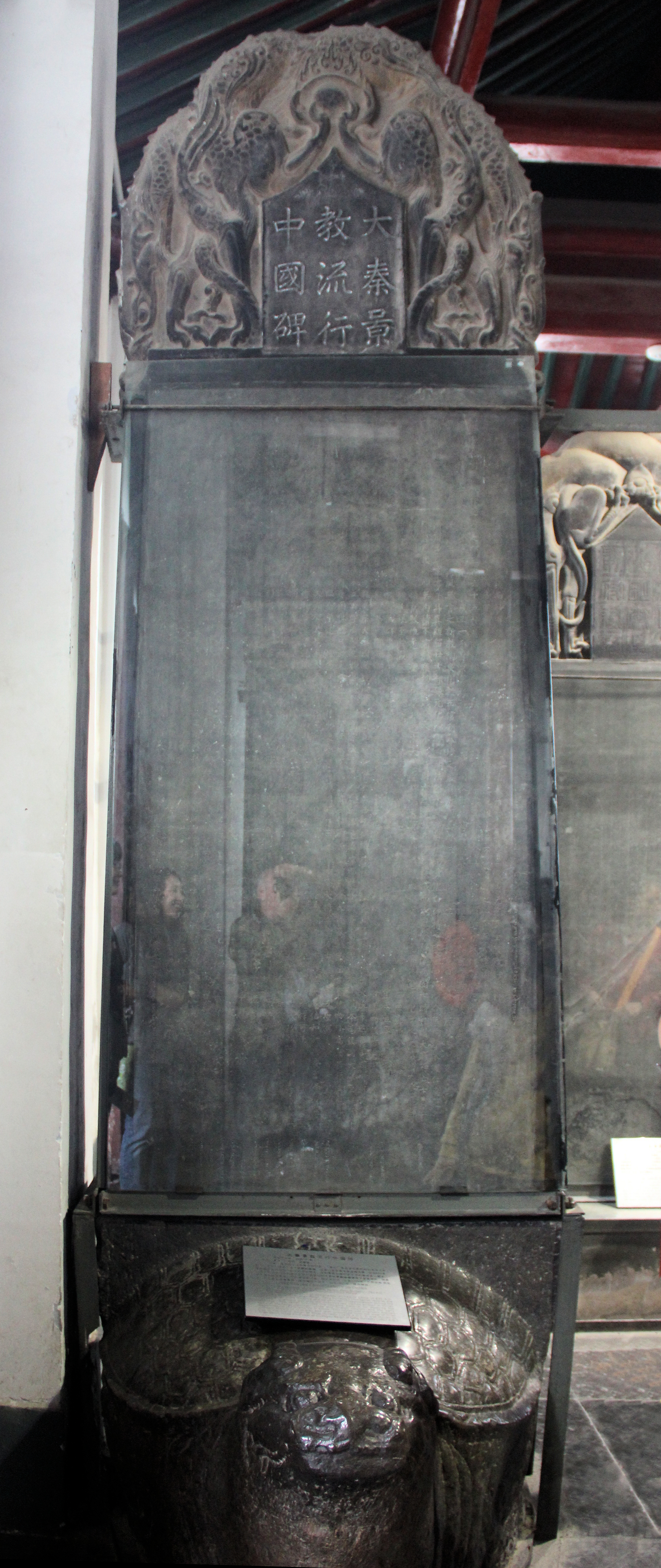
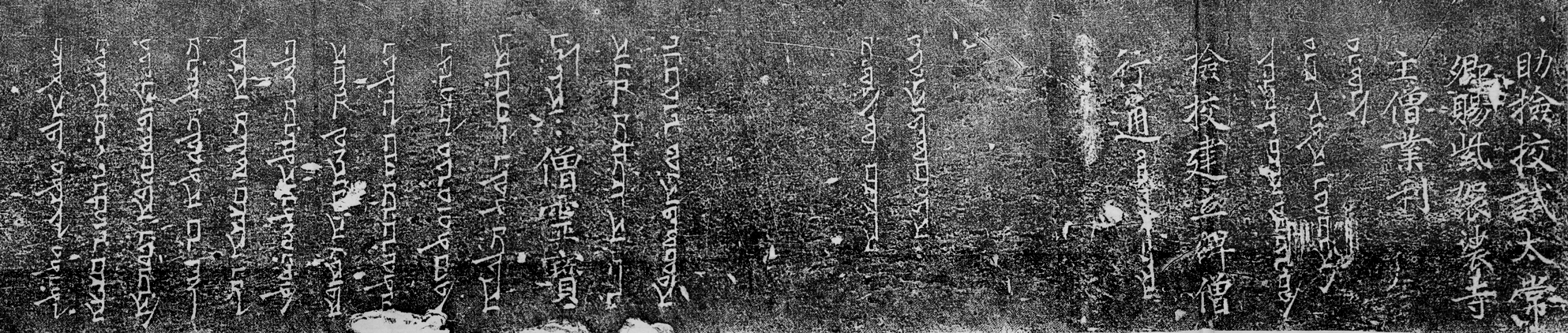
An example from China: the Syriac text at the bottom of the Xi'an Stele mentions that the stele was erected in the "Year of the Greeks 1092" (781 AD), at the imperial capital city of Chang'an (modern-day Xi'an).

The Seleucid era was used as late as the sixth century AD, for instance in the Zabad inscription in Syria, dated the 24th of Gorpiaios, 823 (24 September, 512 AD), and in the writings of John of Ephesus. Syriac chroniclers continued to use it up to Michael the Syrian in the 12th century AD / 15th century AG. It has been found on Central Asian tombstones of Christians belonging to the Church of the East well into the 14th century AD.

The Seleucid era counting, or "era of contracts" (minyān shəṭarōṯ), was used by Yemenite Jews in their legal deeds and contracts until modern times, a practice derived from an ancient Jewish teaching in the Talmud, requiring all Diaspora Jews to uphold its practice. The Seleucid era counting is mentioned in the Book of Maccabees (I Macc. i. 11) and in the writings of the historian Josephus. The Seleucid era counting fell into disuse among most Jewish communities, following Rabbi David ben Zimra's cancellation of the practice when he served as Chief Rabbi of Egypt.
