= October 9 (Eastern Orthodox liturgics) =

Day in the Eastern Orthodox liturgical calendar

Eastern Orthodox liturgical calendar
| October 8 | October 9 | October 10 |
October 9 O.S. ≍ October 22 N.S. October 9 N.S ≍ September 26 O.S.

An Eastern Orthodox cross

October 9 in Eastern Orthodox liturgical calendars is a feast day and a day of commemoration of saints and martyrs. Although some Orthodox churches use the Revised Julian Calendar and others use the traditional Julian calendar, the fixed commemorations for their respective October 9 are broadly the same, no matter which calendar is used. (Note: Despite the dates being the same, the days to which they refer typically differ by 13 days. The notation Old Style or O.S. is sometimes used to indicate a date in the traditional Julian Calendar (the "Old Calendar"). The notation New Style or N.S. indicates a date in the Revised Julian calendar (the "New Calendar").)

== Saints ==
- Righteous Forefather Abraham and his nephew righteous Lot (c. 2000 B.C.) (Note: Name days celebrated today include: Abraham (Ἀβραάμ).) (Note: "The same day, the commemoration of the holy patriarch Abraham, father of all believers.")
- Holy Apostle James, son of Alphaeus (1st century)
- Saint Demetrius, Bishop of Alexandria (231)
- Saint Publia the Confessor, Deaconess, of Antioch (361-363) (Note: "At Antioch, St. Publia, abbess, who, whilst Julian the Apostate was passing by, sang with her religious these words of David: "The idols of the Gentiles are silver and gold;" and: "Let them that make them, become like unto them."; By the command of the emperor, she was struck on the face and severely rebuked.")
- Martyrs Juventinus and Maximinus, soldiers, at Antioch (361-363) (see also: September 5, October 12)
- Venerables Andronicus and his wife St. Athanasia, of Egypt (6th century) (Note: "At Jerusalem, the Saints Andronicus, and Athanasia, his wife.") (see also: March 2)
- Saint Peter of Galatia (9th century)

== Pre-Schism Western saints ==
- Hieromartyr Dionysius (Denis, Dennis, Denys), Bishop of Paris, with his companions Rusticus and Eleutherius (c. 258) (Note: According to St Gregory of Tours, Denis, or Dionysius, was born in Italy and sent with five other bishops to Gaul: he became the first Bishop of Paris. He and his two companions were beheaded under Decius and the monastery of St Denis was built over their tomb. (Note, the Roman Martyrology confounds Dionysius of Paris with Dionysius the Areopagite).)
- Saint Domninus of Fidenza (Donnino), martyr (304) (Note: Born in Parma in Italy, while fleeing his persecutors, he was overtaken and beheaded on the Via Claudia or Aemilia. This was a few miles outside Parma at a place now called Borgo San Donnino after him, where his relics are venerated.) (Note: "At Julia (now Borgo-San-Donnino), near Parma, on the Claudian road, St. Domninus, martyr, under the emperor Maximian. As he was trying to escape the raging persecution, he was overtaken by his pursuers, and being transpierced with a sword, died gloriously.")
- Saint Gislenus (Ghislain, Guislain), a confessor and anchorite in Belgium (680) (Note: A hermit who lived in the forest in Hainault in Belgium where several disciples gathered around him. He built the monastery of Sts Peter and Paul, now Saint-Ghislain near Mons, where he was abbot for thirty years.) (Note: "In Hainaut, St. Gislenus, bishop and confessor, who, resigning his See, led the monastical life in a monastery built by himself, and was distinguished by many virtues.")
- Saints Lambert and Valerius (Bellère, Beriher), disciples of St Gislenus in Belgium and the north of France (c. 680)
- Saint Geminus, A monk at San Paterniano de Fano in Umbria, Italy (c. 815) (Note: He is the patron-saint of San Gemini.)
- Saint Savin (Sabinus), venerated as one of the Apostles of the Lavedan, in the Pyrenees, France (c. 820)
- Saint Deusdedit, a monk at Montecassino in Italy, chosen abbot about the year 830 (836) (Note: He was noted for his almsgiving. To extort money from him, a tyrant ill-treated and imprisoned him. He died in prison of hunger and misery and was venerated as a martyr.) (Note: "At Cassino, St. Deusdedit, abbot, who was cast into prison by the tyrant Sicardus, and being there consumed with hunger and misery, yielded up his soul.")
- Saint Gunther of Bohemia, a Bohemian hermit (1045) (Note: A cousin of St Stephen of Hungary. He began life full of worldly ambition, but was brought to better ways by St Godehard of Hildesheim and became a monk at Niederaltaich in Bavaria. His ambitious nature asserted itself once more and he became Abbot of Göllingen but proved a failure. Made wise by experience, he went to live as a hermit for twenty-eight years in the mountains of Bakory in Hungary.)

== Post-Schism Orthodox saints ==
- Blessed Stefan Lazarević, King of Serbia (1427)
- Saint Stephen the Blind, King of Serbia (1468)

=== New Martys and Confessors ===
- New Hieromartyrs Constantine Sukhov and Peter Vyatkin, Priests (1918)
- New Hieromartyr Constantine Aksenov, Priest (1937)

== Other commemorations ==
- Icon of the Most Holy Theotokos "Korsun" (Cherson) (988) (Note: See: (in Russian) Корсунская икона Божией Матери. Википедии. (Russian Wikipedia).)
- Icon of the Most Holy Theotokos "Assuage My Sorrow" (12th century)
- Glorification (1989) of New Hiero-confessor Tikhon (Bellavin), Patriarch of Moscow and all Russia (1925) (see also: September 26)
- Uncovering of the relics (1997) of New Hiero-confessor Sebastian (Fomin), Archimandrite, of Optina and Karaganda (1966) (Note: See: (in Russian) Севастиан (Фомин). Википедии. (Russian Wikipedia).)
- Uncovering of the relics (2007) of St. Job (Kundrya), Archimandrite, of Malaya Ugolka, Carpatho-Russia (1985) (see also: July 15)

== Icon gallery ==
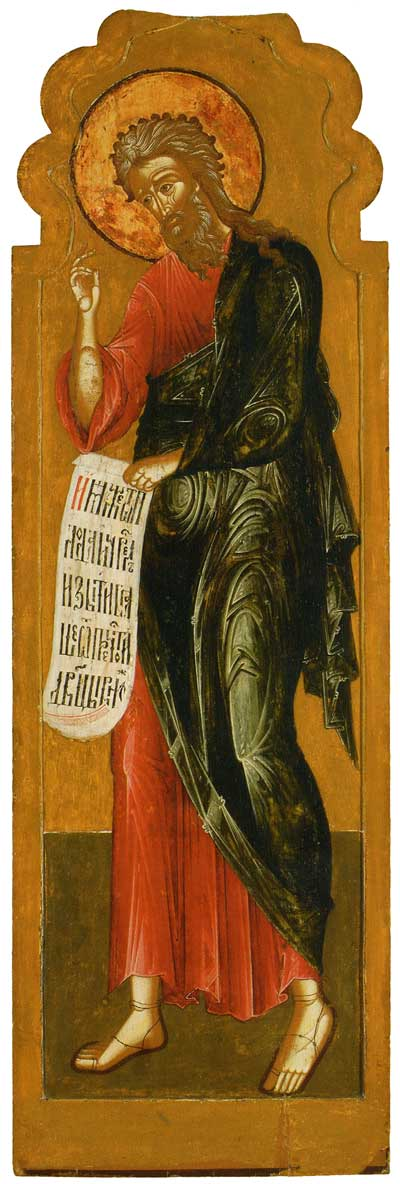
Patriarch Abraham.

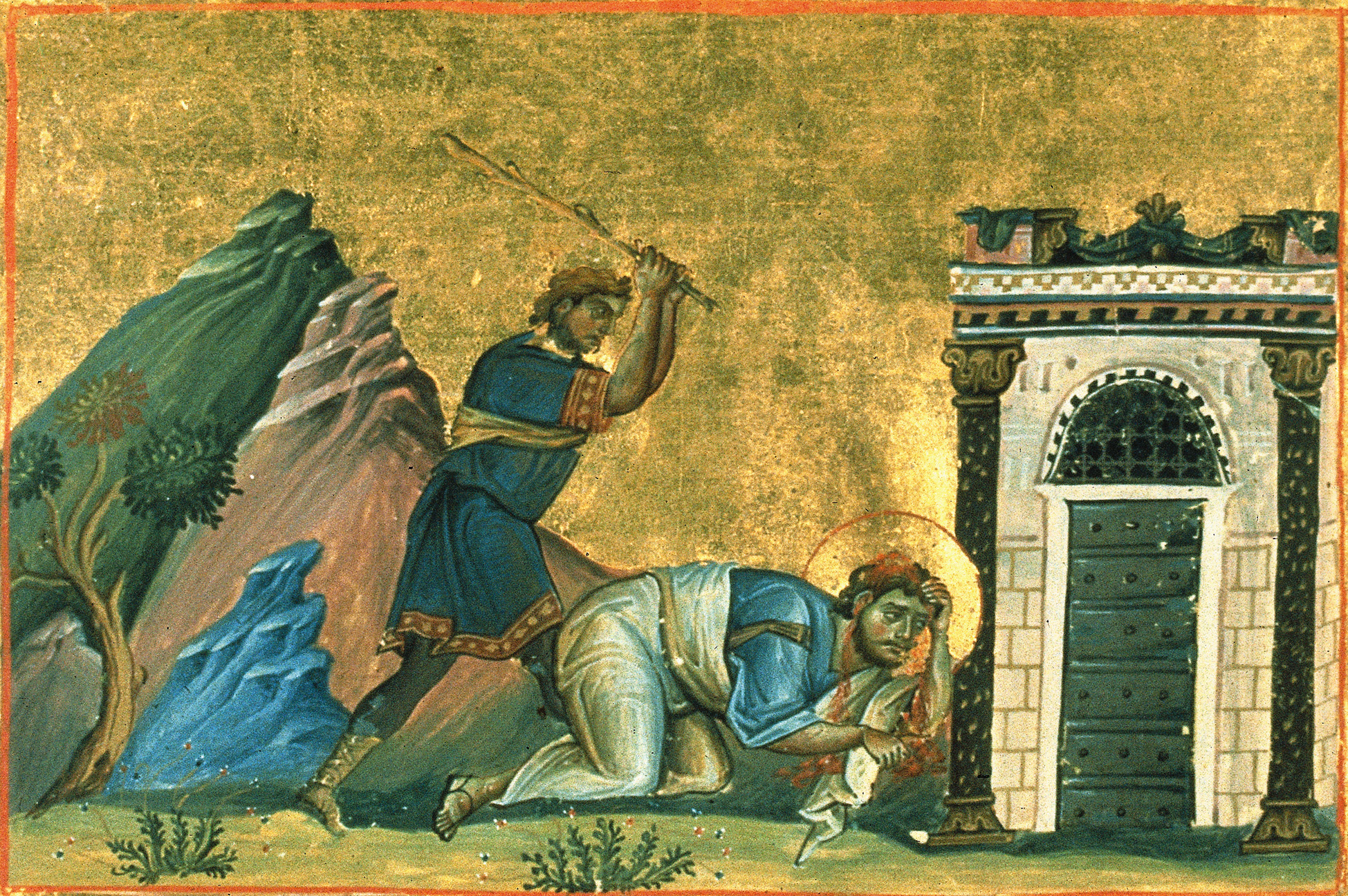
Holy Apostle James, son of Alphaeus.
(Menologion of Basil II, 10th century).

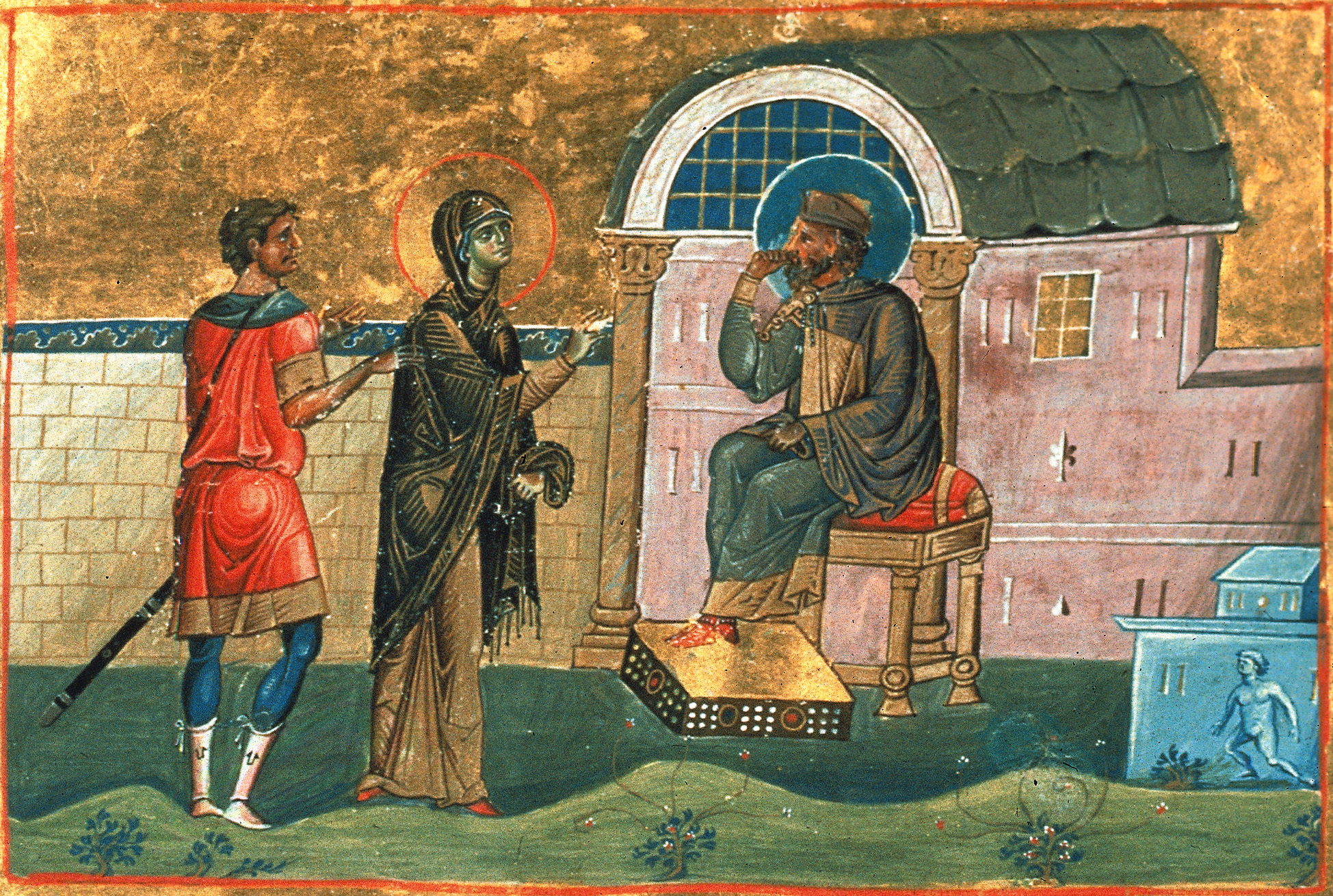
Saint Publia the Confessor, Deaconess, of Antioch.
(Menologion of Basil II, 10th century).

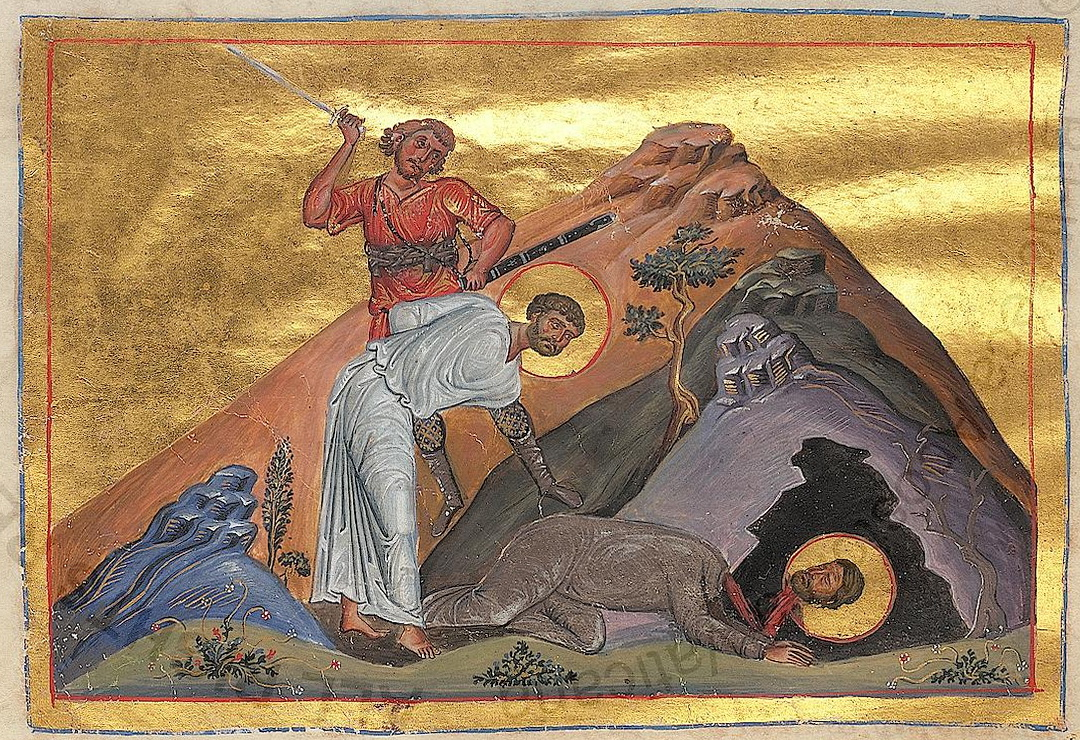
Martyrs Juventinus and Maximinus, soldiers, at Antioch.
(Menologion of Basil II, 10th century).

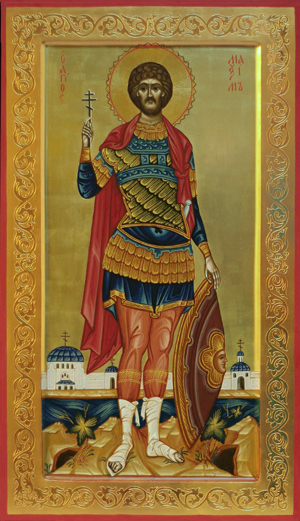
Martyr Maximinus (Maxym), soldier.

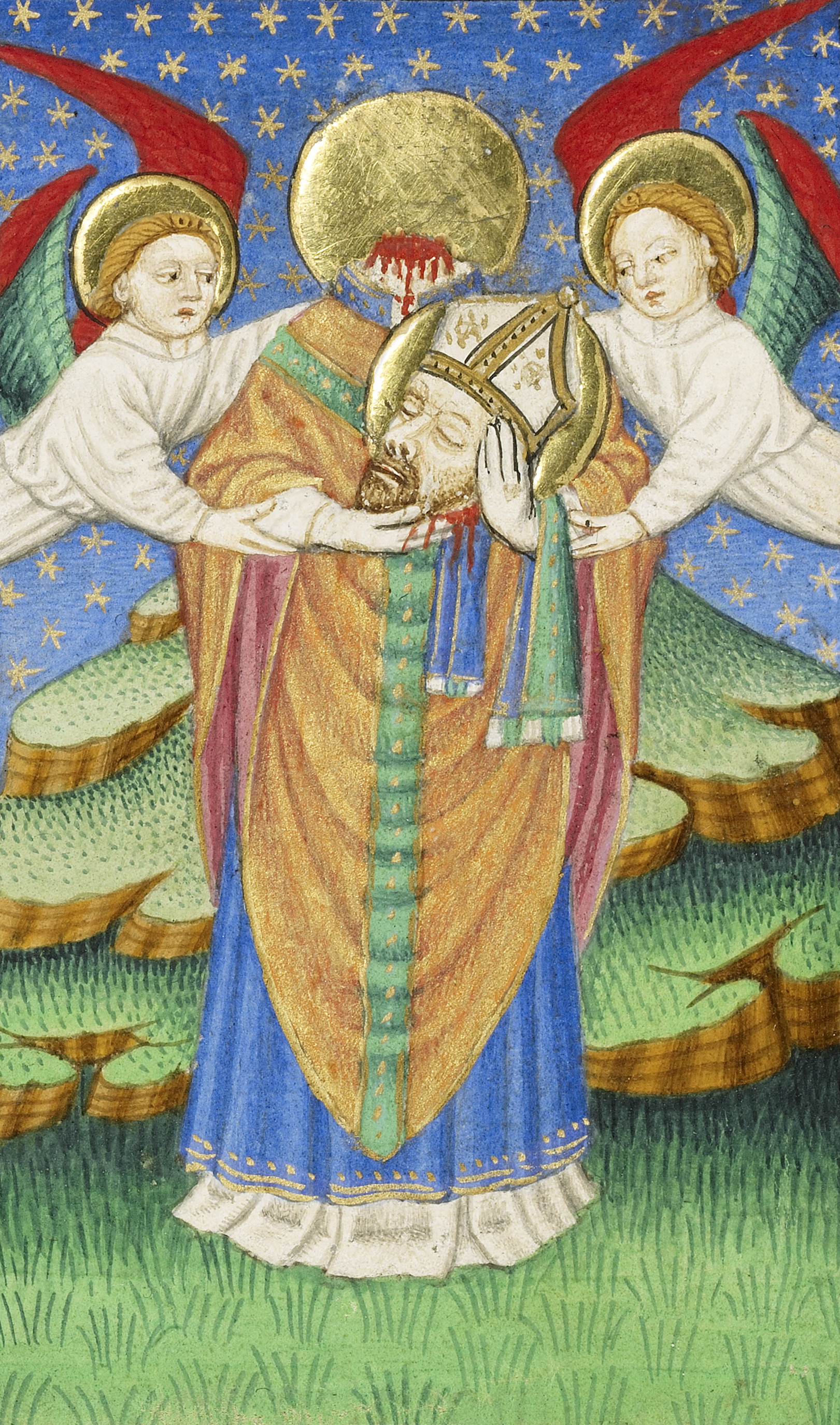
Hieromartyr Dionysius, Bishop of Paris.

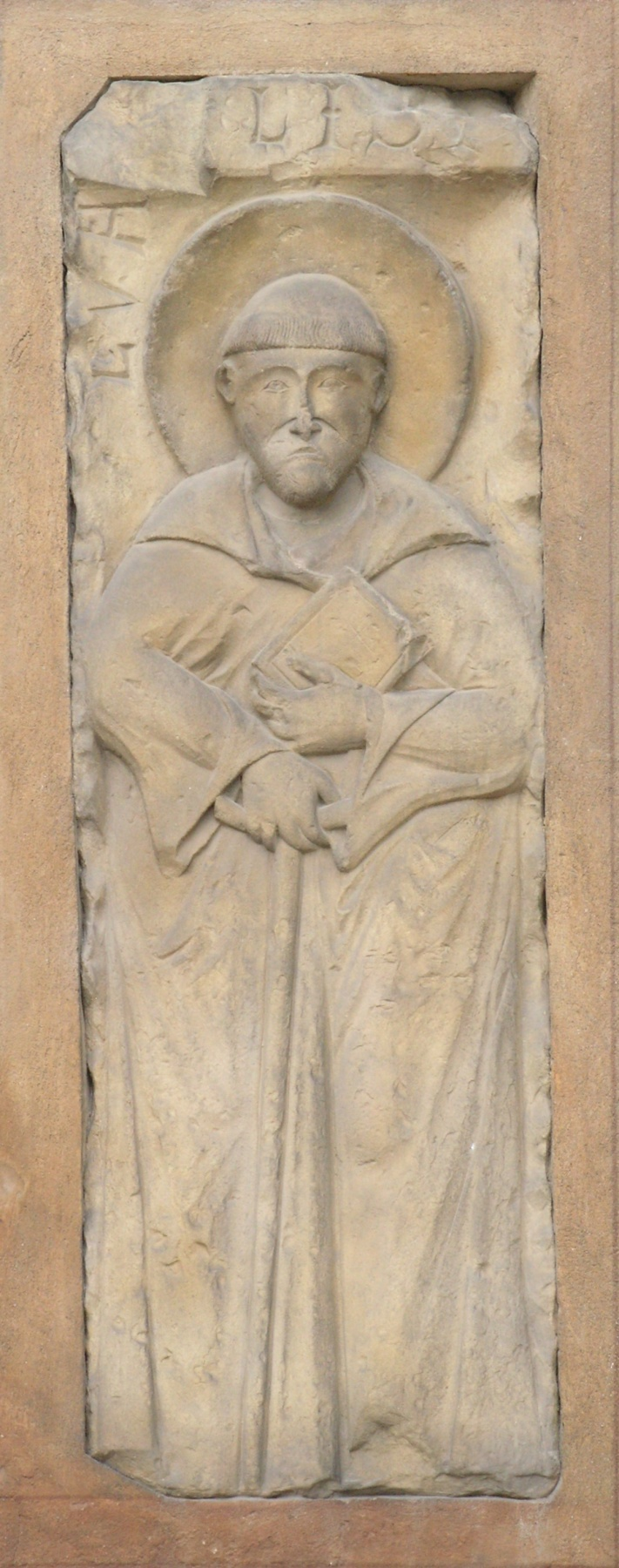
St. Gunther of Bohemia, tombstone effigy.

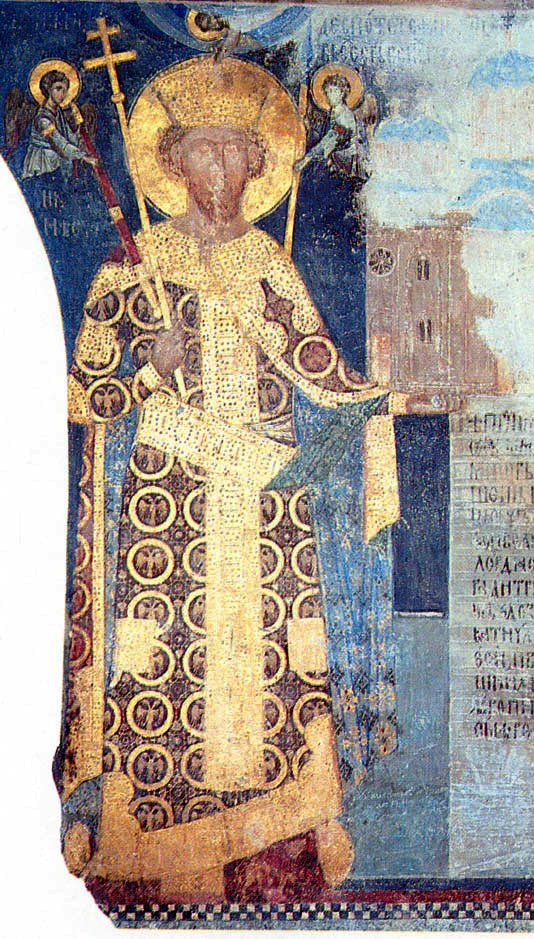
Blessed Stefan Lazarević, King of Serbia.

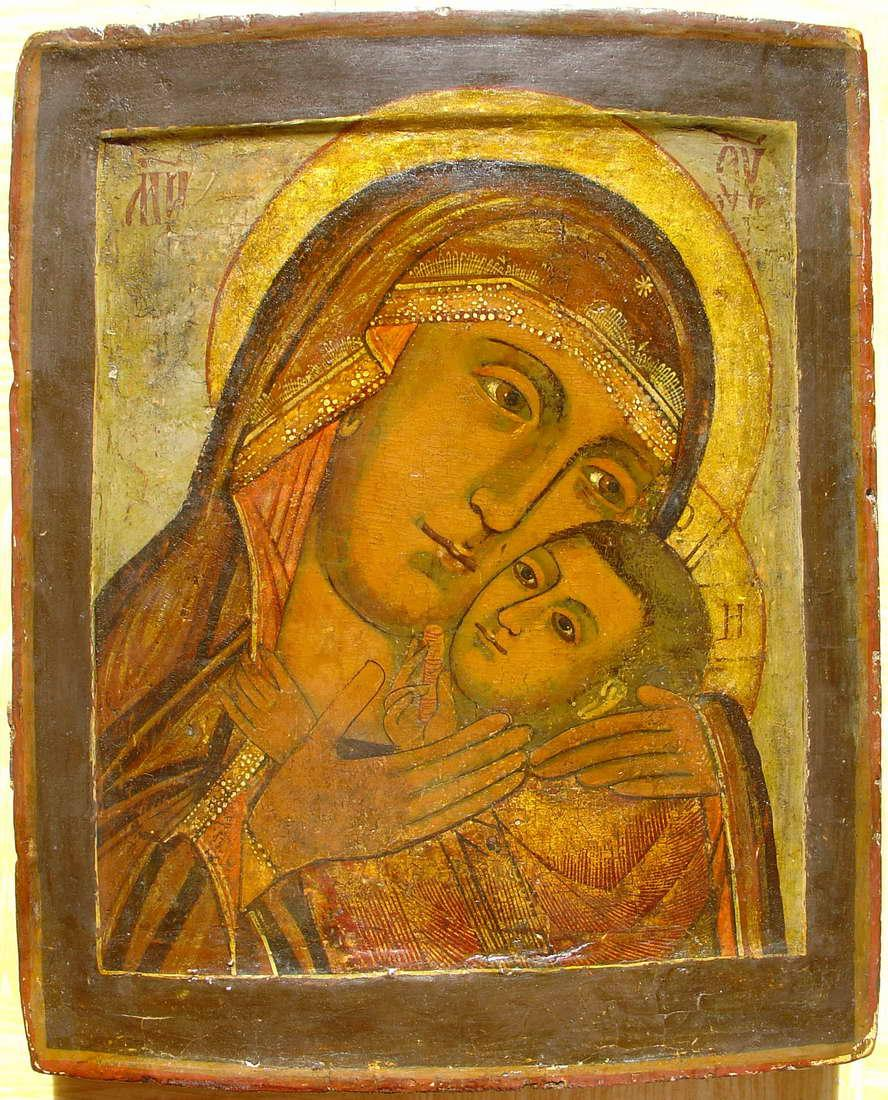
Icon of the Most Holy Theotokos "Korsun" (Cherson).

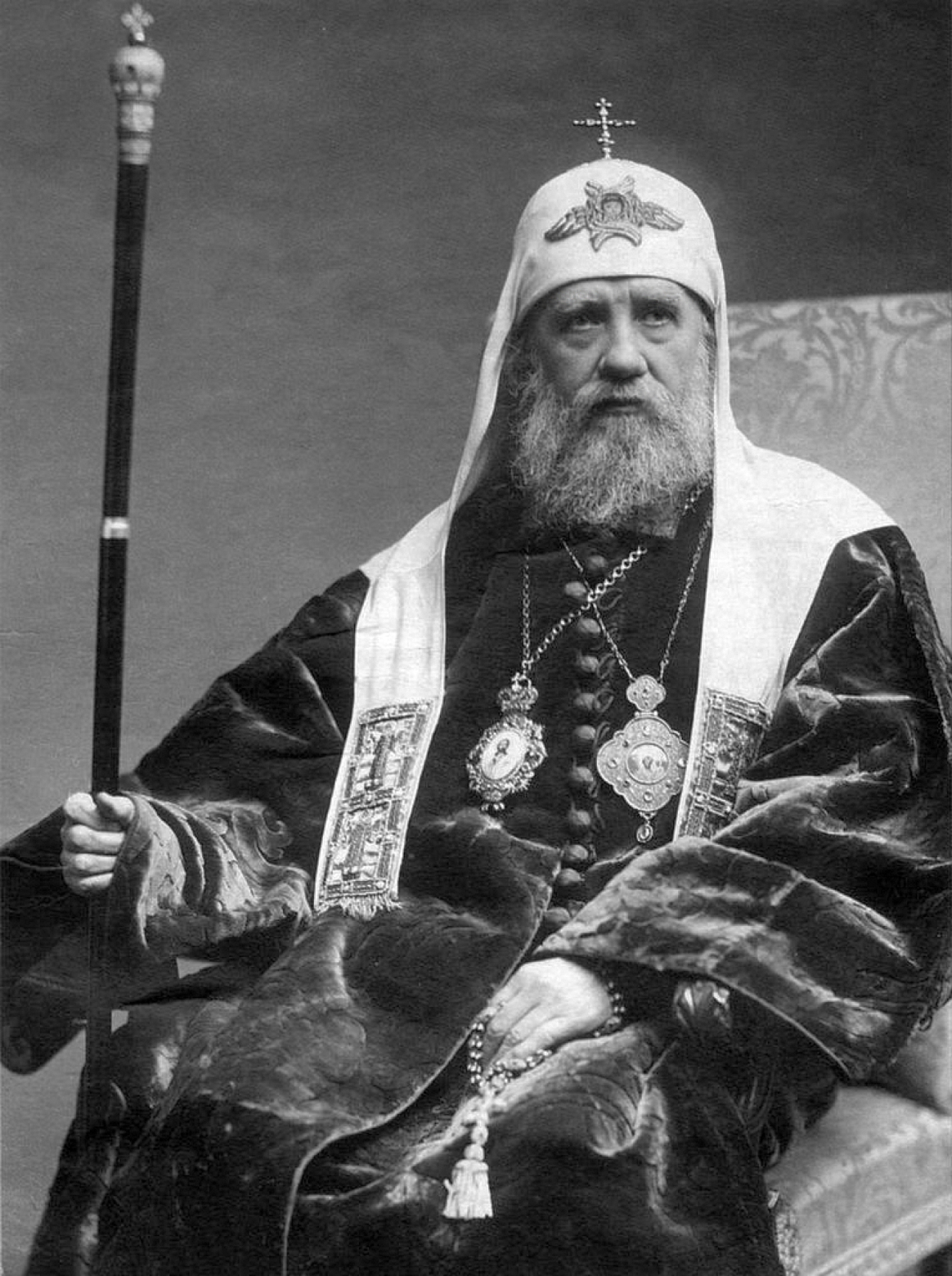
New Hiero-confessor Tikhon (Bellavin), Patriarch of Moscow and all Russia.

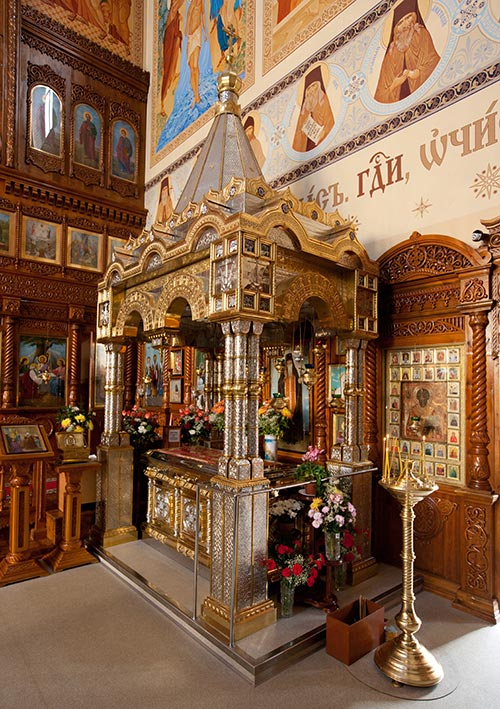
Reliquary containing the relics of New Hiero-confessor Sebastian (Fomin).

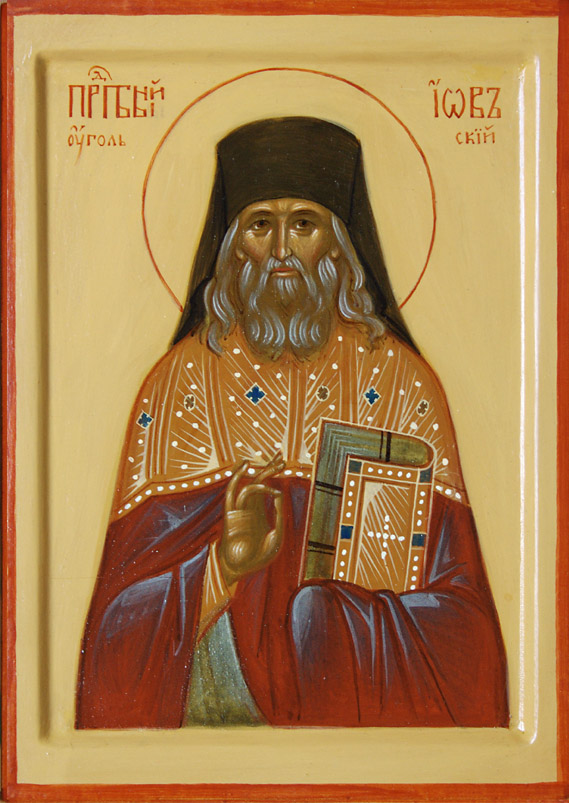
St. Job (Kundrya), Archimandrite, of Malaya Ugolka, Carpatho-Russia.

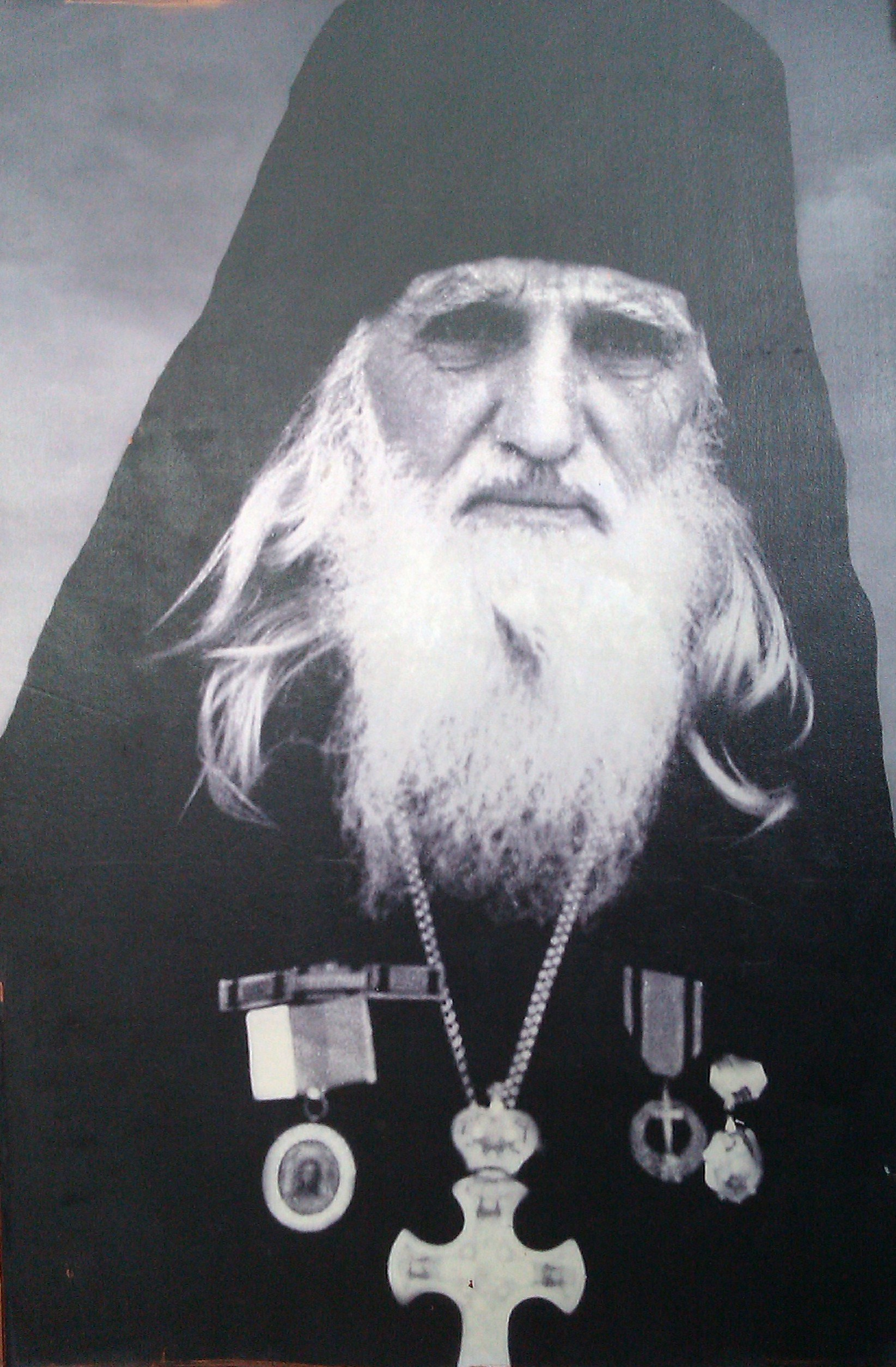
St. Job (Kundrya), Archimandrite, of Malaya Ugolka, Carpatho-Russia.

== Sources ==
- October 9/22. Orthodox Calendar (PRAVOSLAVIE.RU).
- October 22 / October 9. HOLY TRINITY RUSSIAN ORTHODOX CHURCH (A parish of the Patriarchate of Moscow).
- October 9. OCA - The Lives of the Saints.
- The Autonomous Orthodox Metropolia of Western Europe and the Americas (ROCOR). St. Hilarion Calendar of Saints for the year of our Lord 2004. St. Hilarion Press (Austin, TX). p. 75.
- The Ninth Day of the Month of October. Orthodoxy in China.
- October 9. Latin Saints of the Orthodox Patriarchate of Rome.
- The Roman Martyrology. Transl. by the Archbishop of Baltimore. Last Edition, According to the Copy Printed at Rome in 1914. Revised Edition, with the Imprimatur of His Eminence Cardinal Gibbons. Baltimore: John Murphy Company, 1916. pp. 311–312.
- Rev. Richard Stanton. A Menology of England and Wales, or, Brief Memorials of the Ancient British and English Saints Arranged According to the Calendar, Together with the Martyrs of the 16th and 17th Centuries. London: Burns & Oates, 1892. pp. 481–483.

Greek Sources

- Great Synaxaristes: (in Greek) 9 ΟΚΤΩΒΡΙΟΥ. ΜΕΓΑΣ ΣΥΝΑΞΑΡΙΣΤΗΣ.
- (in Greek) Συναξαριστής. 9 Οκτωβρίου. ECCLESIA.GR. (H ΕΚΚΛΗΣΙΑ ΤΗΣ ΕΛΛΑΔΟΣ).
- (in Greek) 09/10/2017. Ορθόδοξος Συναξαριστής.

Russian Sources

- (in Russian) 22 октября (9 октября). Православная Энциклопедия под редакцией Патриарха Московского и всея Руси Кирилла (электронная версия). (Orthodox Encyclopedia - Pravenc.ru).
- (in Russian) 9 октября по старому стилю / 22 октября по новому стилю. Русская Православная Церковь - Православный церковный календарь на 2016 год.
