= Carl Gustav Thulin =

Swedish shipowner

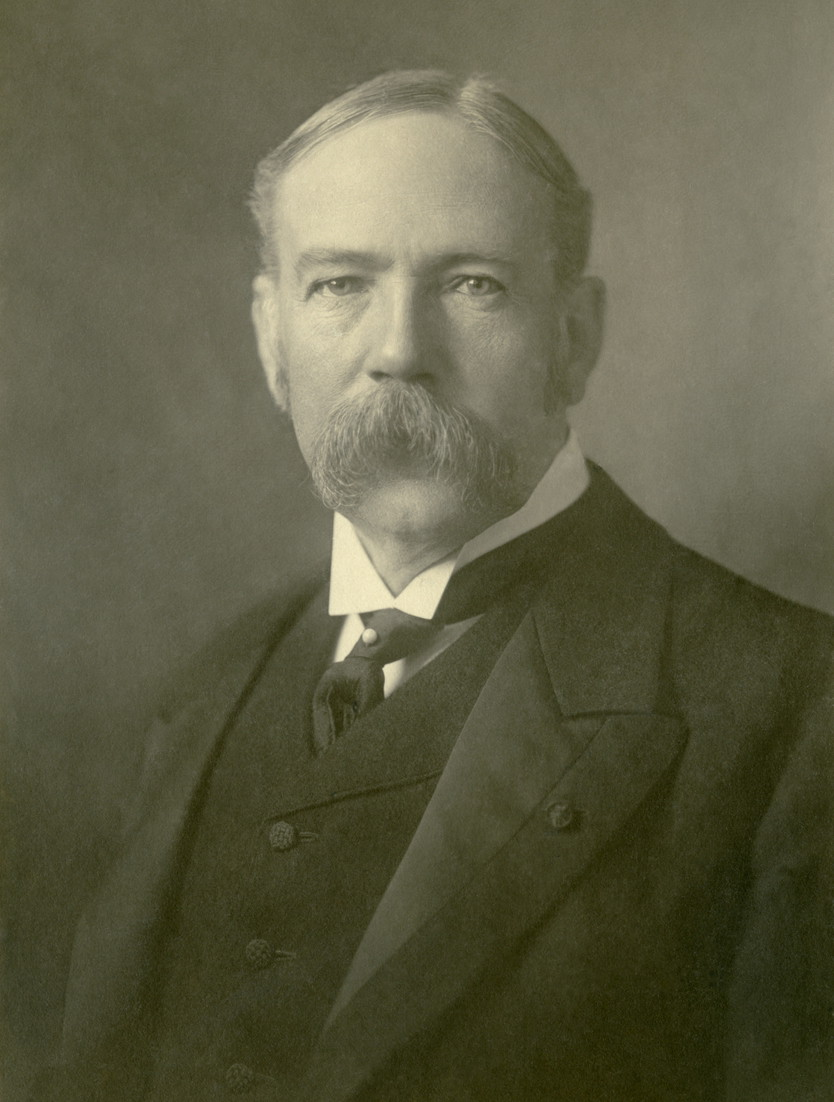
Carl Gustav Thulin

Carl Gustav Thulin (9 October 1845 – 25 March 1918) was a Swedish shipowner. He co-owned and later became the sole owner of the shipping company Nordström & Thulin.

== Biography ==
He was the son of Anders Thulin och Charlotta Thulin. In 1861, he was employed at the age of sixteen by ship broker Carl David Nordström at a firm that since 1850 had worked with cargoing ships in Stockholm. In 1866, Thulin became co-owner of the company that was called Nordström & Thulin. That same year the company bought its first own ship. He became the sole owner of the shipping company.
