= September 26 (Eastern Orthodox liturgics) =

Day in the Eastern Orthodox liturgical calendar

Eastern Orthodox liturgical calendar
September 25	September 26	September 27
September 26 O.S. ≍ October 9 N.S. September 26 N.S ≍ September 13 O.S.

An Eastern Orthodox cross

September 26 in Eastern Orthodox liturgical calendars is a feast day and a day of commemoration of saints and martyrs. Although some Orthodox churches use the Revised Julian Calendar and others use the traditional Julian calendar, the fixed commemorations for their respective September 26 are broadly the same, no matter which calendar is used. (Note: Despite the dates being the same, the days to which they refer typically differ by 13 days. The notation Old Style or O.S. is sometimes used to indicate a date in the traditional Julian Calendar (the "Old Calendar"). The notation New Style or N.S. indicates a date in the Revised Julian calendar (the "New Calendar").)

== Saints ==
- Righteous Gideon, Judge of Israel (c. 1307 BC) (Note: He is likened to Christ (i.e. the Nativity of Christ) in Church hymnography.)
- Repose of the Holy Apostle and Evangelist John the Theologian (2nd century) (Note: "St. John lived a long life, dying at about the age of 100 (c. AD 98-108). Early Christians marveled at his longevity, and some thought he would not die before the return of Christ (John 21:22). John corrects this assumption by clarifying that Jesus did not say to him that he would not die". He is the presumed author of the Gospel of John, 1, 2 and 3 John, and the Book of Revelation.)
- Virgin-martyrs Thekla, Mariamne, Martha, Mary, and Ennatha, five nuns beheaded in Persia under Shapur II (4th century) (see also: June 9)
- Martyr Kyra (Cyra).

== Pre-Schism Western saints ==
- Saint Senator, a saint honoured in Albano in Italy.
- Saint Eusebius of Bologna, Bishop of Bologna, Confessor (c. 400) (Note: He became Bishop of Bologna in Italy in about 370. He was a close friend of St Ambrose of Milan and an ardent opponent of Arianism.)
- Saint Vigilius, Bishop of Brescia in Lombardy in Italy (c. 506)
- Saint Meugan (Mawghan, Morgan), a disciple of St Illtyd who lived as a hermit and reposed on the Isle of Bardsey in Wales (6th century) (Note: "At Ruthin, in Denbighshire, the festival of ST. MEUGAN." Several churches in Wales and Cornwall are dedicated to him.)
- Saint Amantius, a priest in Città di Castello near Perugia in Italy, who was personally known to St Gregory the Great who revered him (c. 600) (Note: "At Città di Castello, St. Amantius, a priest distinguished for the gift of miracles." He is the patron-saint of Città di Castello.)
- Saint Colmán Elo, a nephew of St Columba, he founded monasteries in Lynally (Land-Elo, Lin-Alli) and in Muckamore, Ireland (c. 610) (Note: He is credited as the author of the Alphabet of Devotion.)
- Saint Nilus the Younger, of Rossano, Calabria, founder of the monastery of Grottaferrata (Crypta-Ferrata) (1004) (Note: "In the territory of Frascati, the blessed abbot Nilus, founder of the monastery of Crypta-Ferrata, a man of eminent sanctity.") (Note: After a carefree youth in the south of Italy, he became a monk at the monastery of St Adrian in Calabria, where he later became abbot. In 981 the invading Saracens drove the monks to Vellelucio, where they lived on land given to them by the monastery of Montecassino. Shortly before his repose, Nilus designated that as the place where his monastery was to be definitively established. This monastery, of Grottaferrata, was for long faithful to Orthodoxy.) (Note: We ought tentatively to regard it as probable that the saints whose lives have come down to us were really the founders of Greek monasticism in South Italy, and that before their time there were no Greek monasteries in the district. There probably were hermits; but the rise of monasteries does not begin before the end of the ninth century; and the leaders of the monks were Elias Junior (†903), Elias Spelaeotes ("the Cave-Dweller", †c. 960), Lucas of Demena (†984), Vitalis of Castronuovo (†994), and Nilus of Rossano (†1004).)

== Post-Schism Orthodox saints ==
- Venerable Ephraim, founder of Perekop Monastery, Wonderworker of Novgorod (1492) (Note: See: (in Russian) Ефрем Перекомский. Википедии. (Russian Wikipedia).)
- Saint Neagoe Basarab, Prince of Wallachia (1521) (Note: He was the ruler of Wallachia in the first quarter of the 16th century. He was a generous donor for the construction of churches. He left teachings written in Church Slavonic to his son Theodosius.)
- Saint Platonida (Milica Despina of Wallachia, Lady Despina Milița), wife of Voivode St. Neagoe Basarab (1554) (Note: See: (in Romanian) Doamna Despina. Wikipedia. (Romanian Wikipedia).)
- Venerable John the Cave-Dweller, ascetic of Sia, Cyprus, Wonderworker.

=== New martyrs and confessors ===
- New Hieromartyrs Athanasius Dokukin, Alexander Levitsky, and Demetrius Rozanov, Priests (1937)
- Martyrs John Zolotov, and Nicholas Gusev (1937)
- New Hieromartyr Vladimir Viatsky, Priest (1939)

== Other commemorations ==
- Translation (1964) of the Honorable Skull of the Apostle Andrew the First-called to Patras. (Note: The skull of St. Andrew the Apostle, the martyred Patron Saint of Greece, was returned to the Greek Orthodox Church on September 26, 1964, as a gesture of Church unity by Pope Paul VI.: "The skull of St. Andrew, the martyred Patron Saint of Greece, arrived by air in Greece last Saturday from Rome. It was returned to the Greek Orthodox Church as a gesture of Church unity by Pope Paul. A Greek Orthodox delegation flew to Rome the day before to accompany the relic to Patras. Cardinal Bea led a party of 15 cardinals accompanying the skull, which is encased in gold, and presented it to Bishop Constantine of Patras, where St. Andrew the Apostle was martyred. His skull was kept there until 1462, when it was removed to Rome to preserve it from the advancing Turks.")
- Glorification (1989) of New Hiero-confessor Tikhon (Bellavin), Patriarch of Moscow and all Russia (1925)
- Arrival of the Iveron Icon of the Mother of God in Georgia (1989) (Note: On September 26, 1989, a copy of this famous icon arrived in Tbilisi, Georgia from the Iveron Monastery on mt. Athos. This copy had been painted by the monks on Mt. Athos as a symbol of love and gratitude to the Georgian people.)

== Icon gallery ==
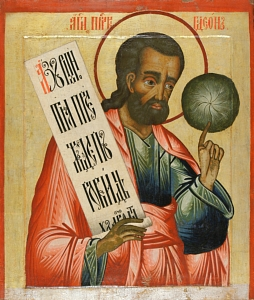
Righteous Gideon, Judge of Israel.

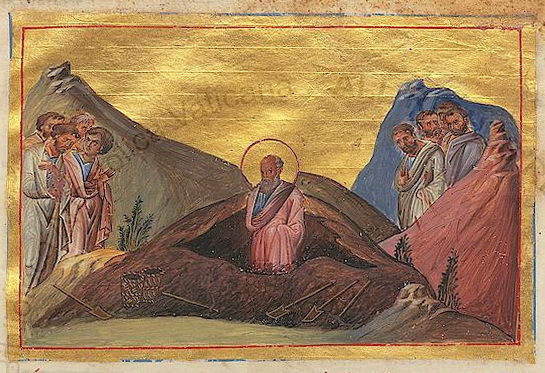
Repose of the Holy Apostle and Evangelist John the Theologian.
(Menologion of Basil II, 10th century).

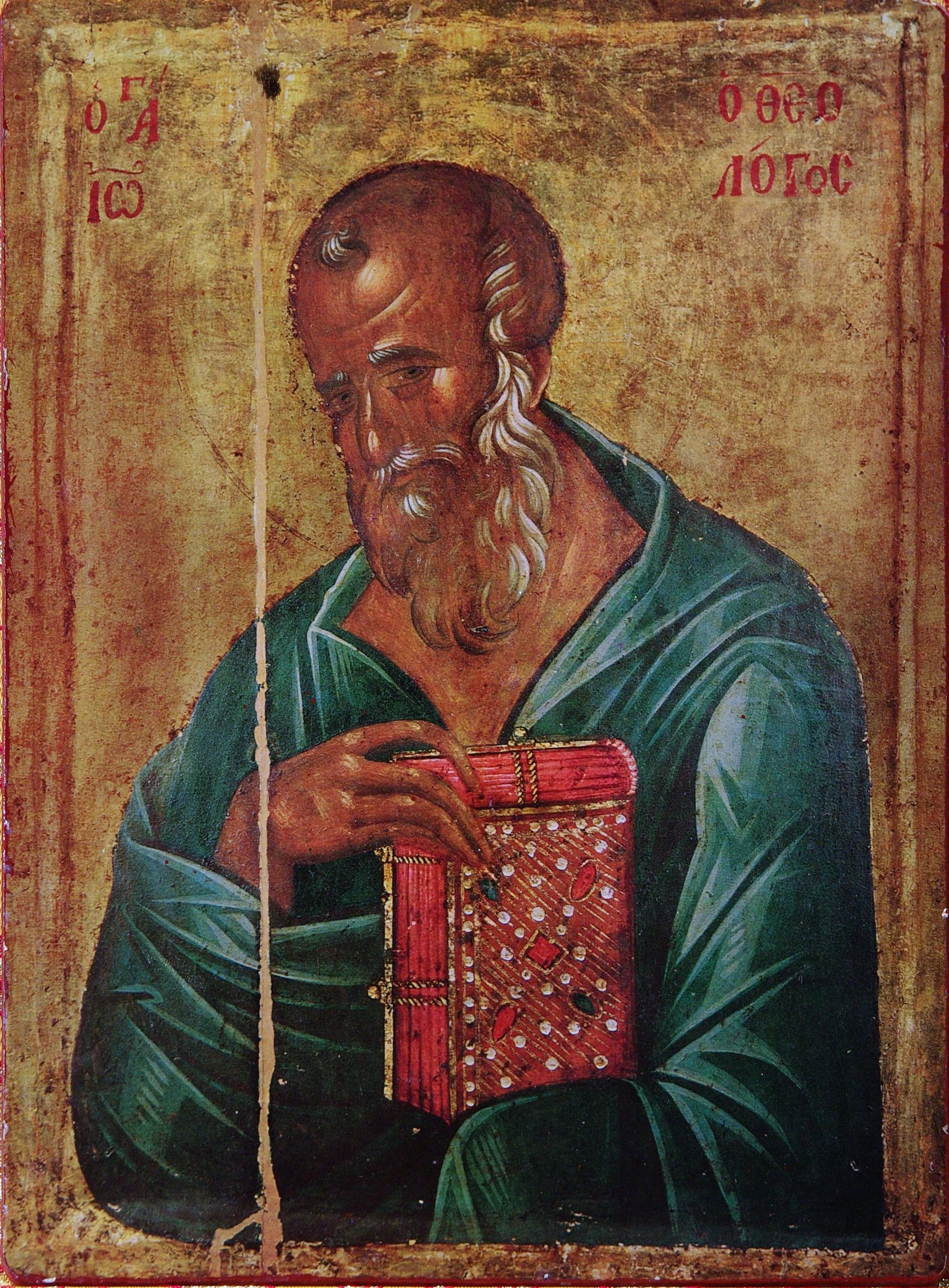
Holy Apostle and Evangelist John the Theologian.

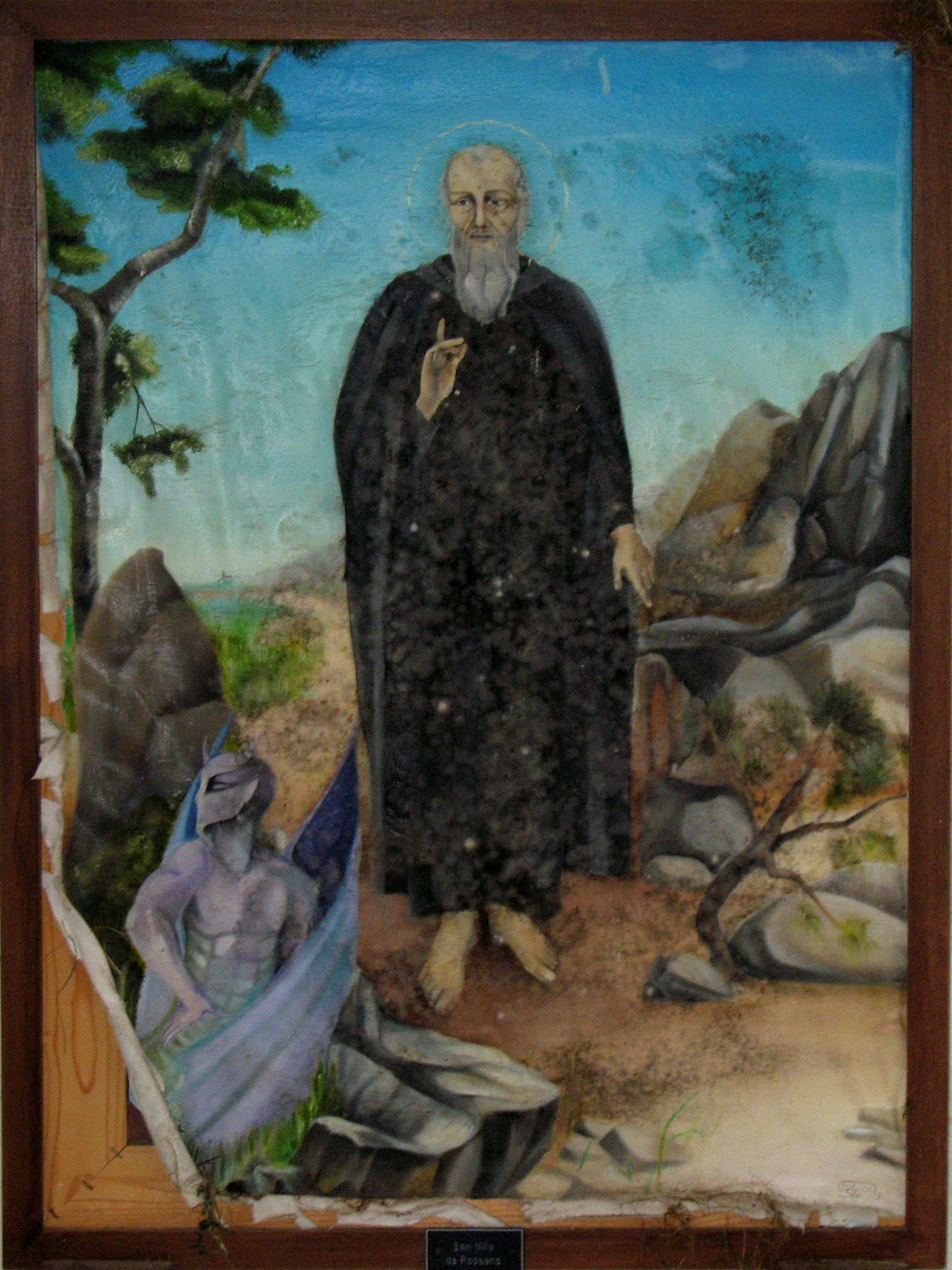
Saint Nilus the Younger.

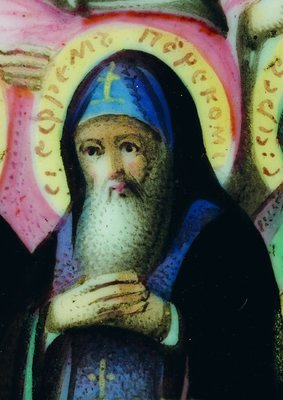
Venerable Ephraim, founder of Perekop Monastery.

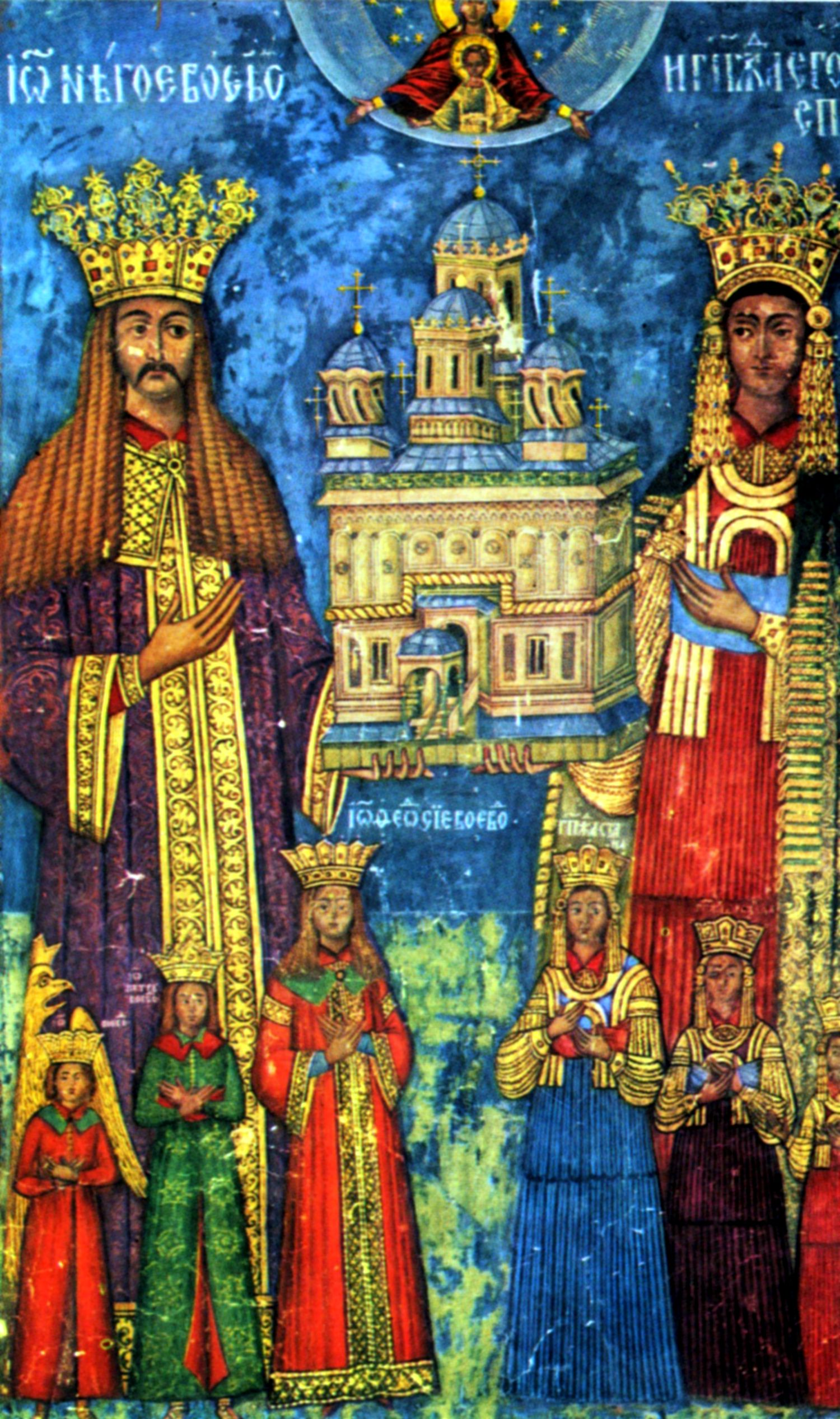
Neagoe Basarab, Milica Despina and his children pictured on the murals of the Curtea de Argeş Monastery.

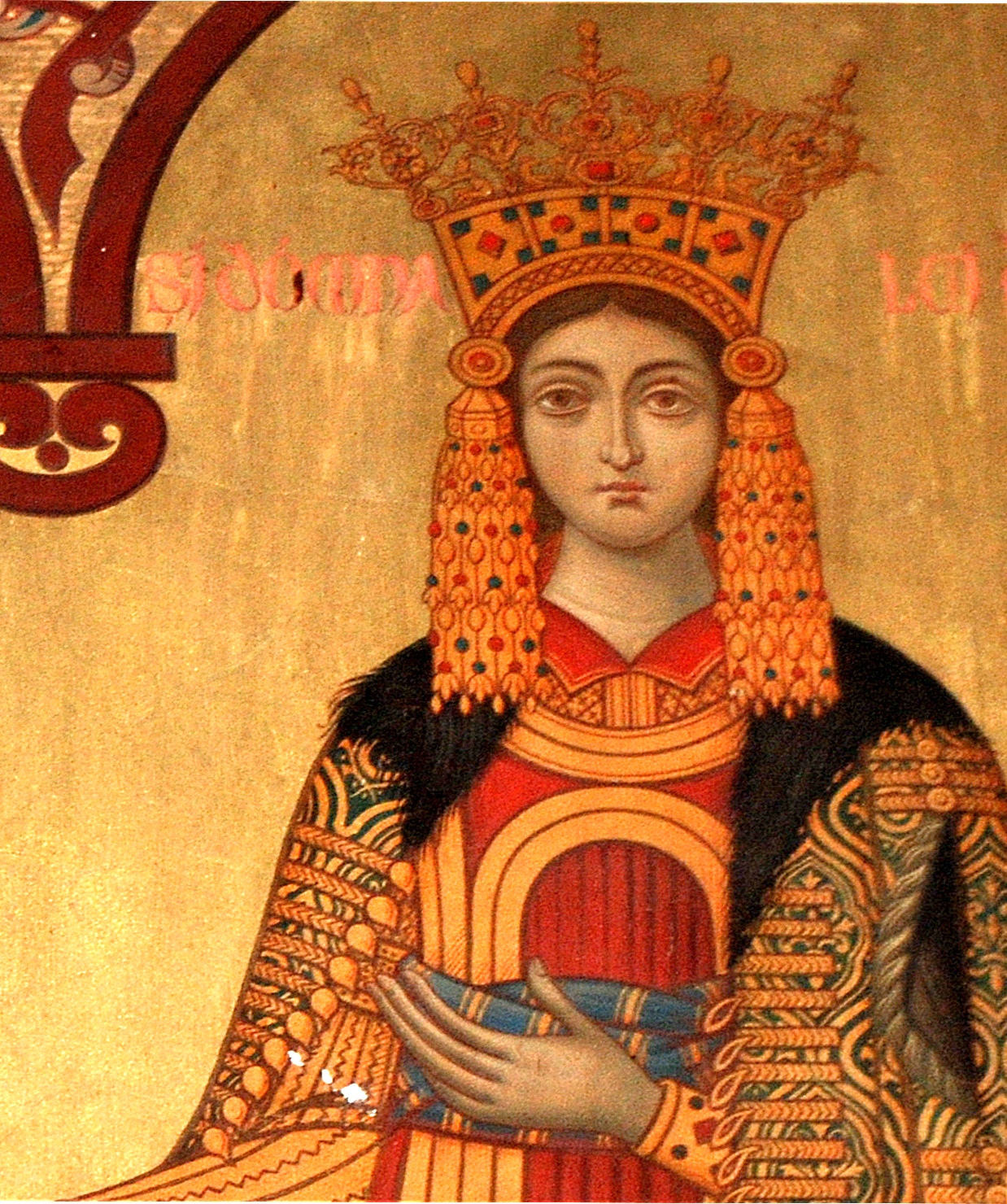
Nun Platonida (Milica Despina of Wallachia, Lady Despina Milița).

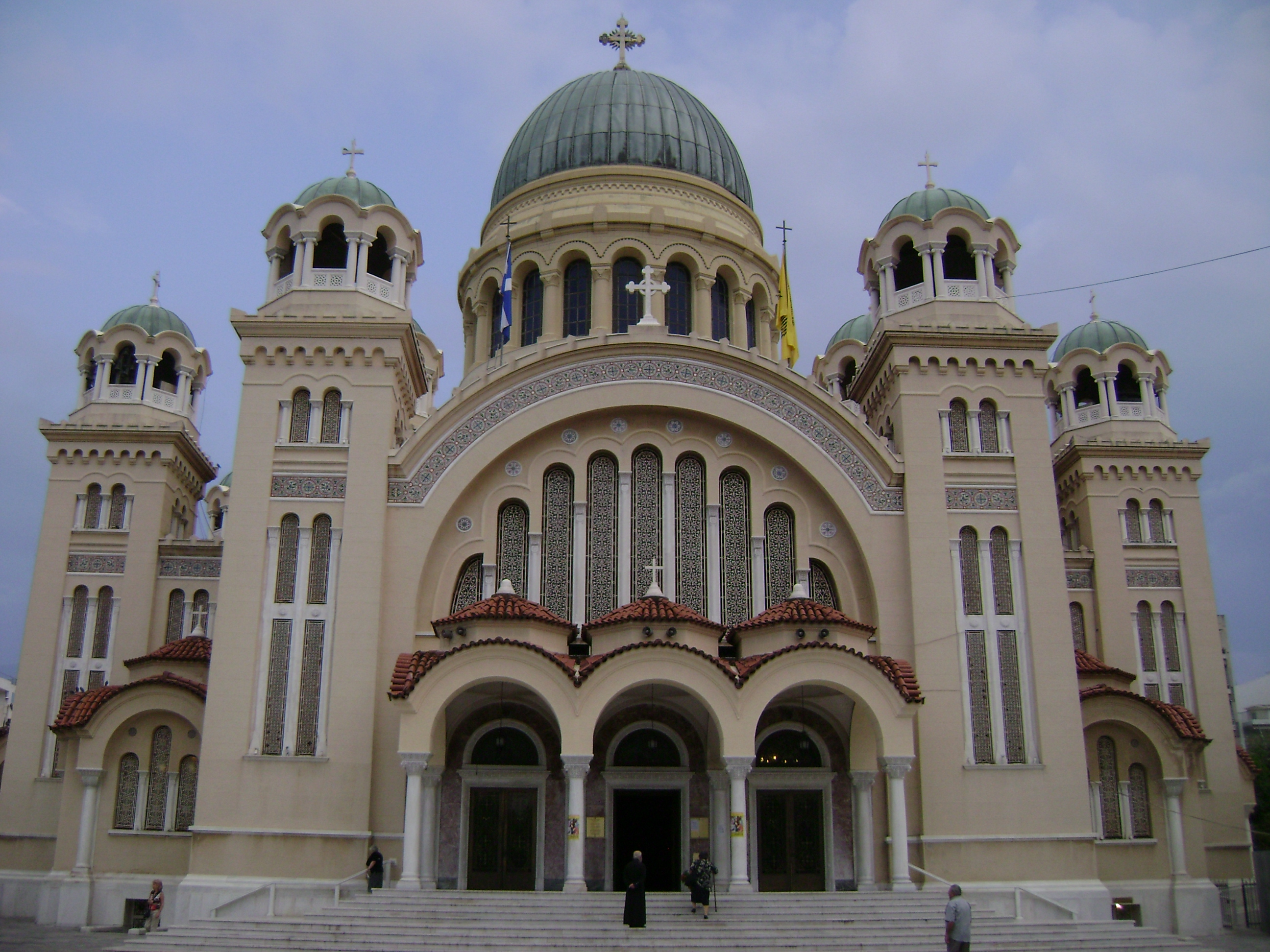
St Andrew's Cathedral, Patras, where St. Andrew's relics are kept.

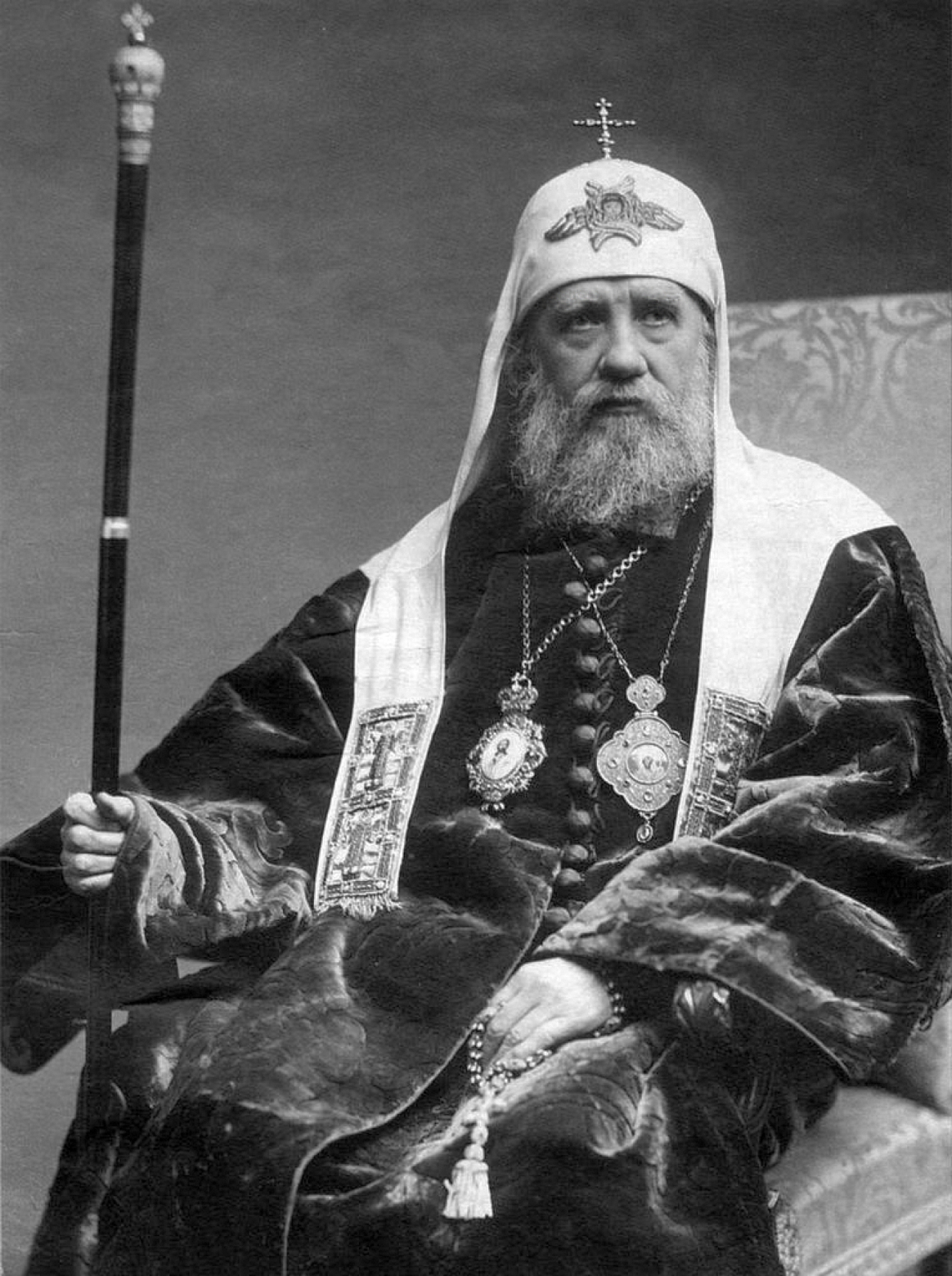
New Hiero-confessor Patriarch Tikhon of Moscow.

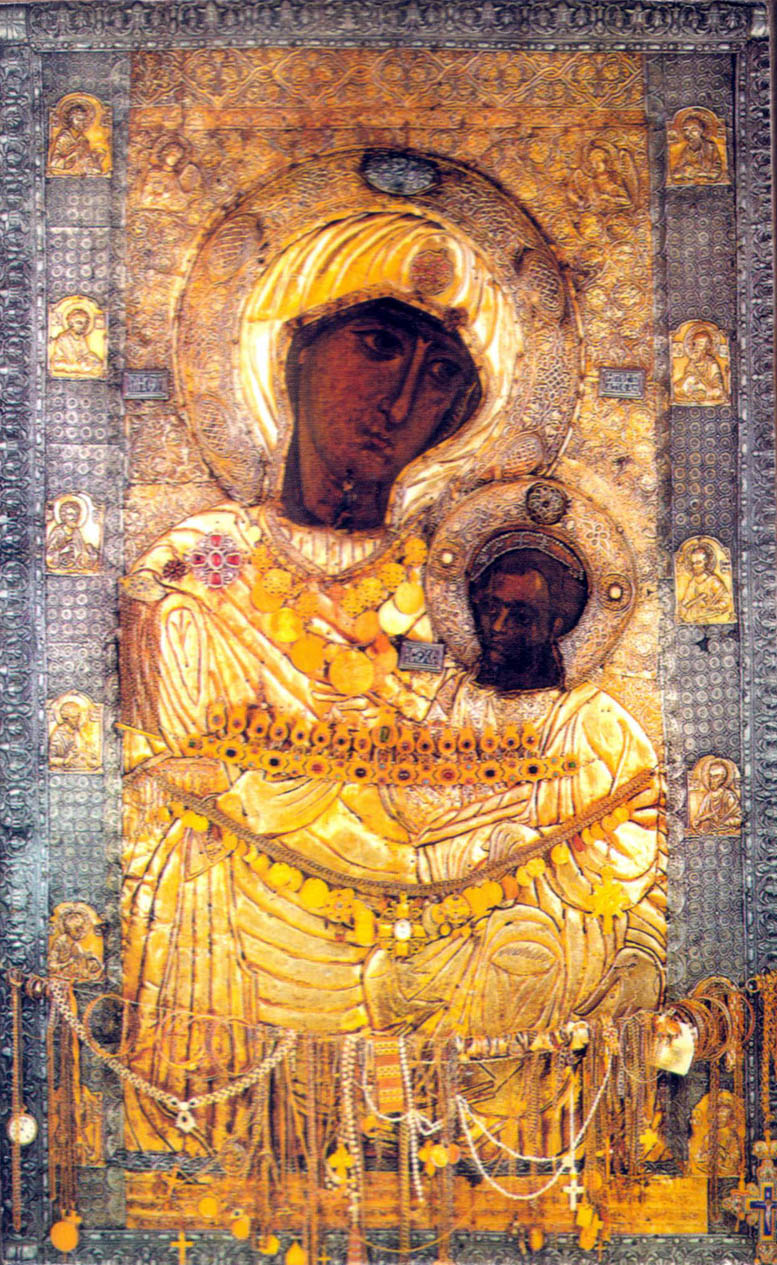
Iveron Icon of the Mother of God.

== Sources ==
- September 26/October 9. Orthodox Calendar (PRAVOSLAVIE.RU).
- October 9 / September 26. HOLY TRINITY RUSSIAN ORTHODOX CHURCH (A parish of the Patriarchate of Moscow).
- September 26. OCA - The Lives of the Saints.
- The Autonomous Orthodox Metropolia of Western Europe and the Americas (ROCOR). St. Hilarion Calendar of Saints for the year of our Lord 2004. St. Hilarion Press (Austin, TX). p. 72.
- The Twenty-Sixth Day of the Month of September. Orthodoxy in China.
- September 26. Latin Saints of the Orthodox Patriarchate of Rome.
- The Roman Martyrology. Transl. by the Archbishop of Baltimore. Last Edition, According to the Copy Printed at Rome in 1914. Revised Edition, with the Imprimatur of His Eminence Cardinal Gibbons. Baltimore: John Murphy Company, 1916. pp. 297–298.
- Rev. Richard Stanton. A Menology of England and Wales, or, Brief Memorials of the Ancient British and English Saints Arranged According to the Calendar, Together with the Martyrs of the 16th and 17th Centuries. London: Burns & Oates, 1892. p. 459.

Greek Sources

- Great Synaxaristes: (in Greek) 26 ΣΕΠΤΕΜΒΡΙΟΥ. ΜΕΓΑΣ ΣΥΝΑΞΑΡΙΣΤΗΣ.
- (in Greek) Συναξαριστής. 26 Σεπτεμβρίου. ECCLESIA.GR. (H ΕΚΚΛΗΣΙΑ ΤΗΣ ΕΛΛΑΔΟΣ).
- (in Greek) 26/09/2016. Ορθόδοξος Συναξαριστής.

Russian Sources

- (in Russian) 9 октября (26 сентября). Православная Энциклопедия под редакцией Патриарха Московского и всея Руси Кирилла (электронная версия). (Orthodox Encyclopedia - Pravenc.ru).
- (in Russian) 26 сентября по старому стилю / 9 октября по новому стилю. Русская Православная Церковь - Православный церковный календарь на 2016 год.
