= Trissino family =

Noble family from Vicenza, Italy

Trissino
- Vert, bendy embattled counter-embattled or, overall a double-headed eagle sable beaked and membered or, armed and langued gules, surmounted by the crown of the Holy Roman Empire
- Founded: 10th century
- Founder: Corrado
- Titles: Counts

Counts of Trissino of Valdagno and annexed lands
- Coat of arms of the Counts Trissino; Blazon: Vert, bendy counter-embattled or, overall a double-headed eagle sable beaked and membered or, armed and langued gules, surmounted by the crown of the Holy Roman Empire
- Creation date: Before the 11th century, historical evidence confirmed with Frederick Barbarossa to Olderico II in 1154 and subsequently with Frederick II in 1236 to brothers Uguccione and Goffredo
- Created by: Holy Roman Emperor
- First holder: Olderico III, 12th century, the first historically verified
- Subsidiary titles: Counts and lords of Brendola, Castelgomberto, Cornedo, Montecchio, Sandrigo, Valdagno, etc., for the various branches of the family. For the Trissino dal Vello d'Oro branch: Counts Palatine, Knights of the Order of the Holy Sepulchre, Knights of the Golden Militia. For all branches: patricians of the city of Vicenza, nobles and knights transmissible through male and female lines
- Branches: Trissino dal Vello d'Oro (extant), Trissino Baston (extinct), Trissino di Riale (extinct), Trissino di Sandrigo (extinct), Trissino Della Pietra (extinct), Trissino di Castelmaggiore (extinct), Trissino Paninsacco (extant), Trissino da Lodi (extant)

The Trissino family (pronounced Trìssino, /ˈtrissino/) is an ancient noble family from the Vicenza region. Of presumed Germanic origin, the family received feudal investiture from both the Holy Roman Empire and the Church, being granted the title of count between the 10th and 11th centuries. Their domains included the eponymous town of Trissino, in the present-day Province of Vicenza, and nearby towns such as Valdagno, Cornedo Vicentino, Castelgomberto, and Sarego, so much so that the Valle dell'Agno was known for several centuries as the Valle di Trissino.

The Trissino family became influential around the year 1000 and throughout the struggles between the Guelphs and Ghibellines, constructing several castles in the Valle di Trissino. By the Renaissance period, they were considered one of the most prominent families in the city of Vicenza. From them emerged the collateral branch of the counts Trissino da Lodi, a distinguished family established between Milan and Piacenza, which developed a completely independent historical trajectory.

The most famous member of the dynasty was the humanist Gian Giorgio Trissino dal Vello d'Oro (1478–1550), renowned as the most illustrious intellectual from Vicenza in the 16th century and the mentor of Andrea Palladio.

A namesake and direct descendant, Gian Giorgio Trissino dal Vello d'Oro (1877–1963), was the first Italian to win at the Olympics, specifically at the 1900 Summer Olympics in Paris. On 31 May he placed second in the equestrian long jump, winning the first-ever Italian Olympic medal, and on 2 June he won first place in the equestrian high jump, earning Italy its first Olympic gold medal.

The family remains extant in Milan and the municipality of Gaiole in Chianti through the senior branch of the Trissino dal Vello d'Oro, whose youngest members represent the forty-fourth generation of the lineage, and between Vicenza and the town of Trissino through the cadet branch of the Trissino di Paninsacco.

== History ==
=== Origins ===
The origins of the Trissino family are lost in the Early Middle Ages. Various historians and scholars between the 17th and 19th centuries outlined several possible hypotheses, based also on the interpretation of numerous documents preserved by the Trissino family themselves. Bernardo Morsolin, in his monograph on Gian Giorgio Trissino, mentions some of these, suggesting that the earliest Trissino may have belonged to the Drepsinates (the ancient inhabitants of the area) or arrived with the Cimbri during the barbarian invasions. However, in his subsequent essay Trissino ricordi storici of 1881, he agrees with the claims of Giambattista Pagliarino, who stated that they descended from Germany around the 11th century ("with one or another of the Emperors of the House of Franconia") and built the ancient castle of Trissino, which later gave its name to the town and the entire valley. The historian Gaetano Maccà in his essay regarding the existence of an ancient mint in Vicenza reconstructs the events of Nicolò Trissino, son of Paolo, who in 1013 was elected Governor of Vicenza and confirmed in office by Emperor Henry II with the authority to mint coins bearing the coat of arms of his family, a privilege later extended by Conrad II.

Traditional accounts, however, claim that the Trissino descend from a legendary hero, Achilles, son of Alcasto, who lived in the city of Troezen in the Peloponnese. At the age of eighteen, he reportedly followed the general Belisarius to Italy during the Gothic War. After the conflict, Achilles is said to have settled in the Valle di Trissino, which was named in memory of Troezen, thus laying the foundations of the family. Gian Giorgio Trissino included the exploits of these figures in his epic poem L'Italia liberata dai Goti of 1547, set during the Gothic War. In 1624, Paolo Beni reconstructed the family’s lineage in his Trattato dell'origine et fatti illustri della famiglia Trissina, in which he cited an ancient document tracing the family’s history, starting with Achilles. The theory of Greek origin is supported by Giovanni Pietro Romani in Corona della nobiltà d'Italia, who considers Paolo Beni’s narrative confirmed by the discovery of coins among the ruins of an ancient house in Castelvecchio di Valdagno, depicting figures in ancient Greek attire with the inscription of the Nobles of Troezen. The traditional lineage of the early Trissino is further detailed in an 18th-century manuscript by Parmenione Trissino, preserved in the so-called Trissino Archive – Trissino dal Vello d'Oro deposit of 1919 – at the Biblioteca Civica Bertoliana in Vicenza.

The most representative figures of the traditional lineage are:

- Alcasto, likely born in 482 AD, married Ericinia, daughter of Timoteo, lord of Athens;
- Achilles (506–559), son of Alcasto, cupbearer to the Byzantine emperor Justinian I and captain in the war against the Goths, settled in the lands between the Agno and Chiampo rivers, married Carienta, daughter of Verulando, a subdued Goth, and had two sons: Giustino and Verulando;
- Giustino (545–608), son of Achilles, married the daughter of the lord of Castelgomberto, thus expanding his domains;
- Bonifacio, son of Ulieno, married Gisulfa, daughter of Gisulf II, Duke of Friuli;
- Alessandro, son of Alcasto, captain of the ships of Maritime Venice during its revolts against the Exarchate and the Lombards (7th century), married Alessia, daughter of Orso (d. 737), third Doge of Venice;
- Giorgio, son of Alessandro, the first with this name, lived 103 years;
- Antonio, son of Claudio, whose possessions in Chiampo and Arzignano were devastated by the Hungarians (9th century);
- Corrado, son of Antonio, fought for Henry, Duke of Bavaria, brother of Emperor Otto the Great (10th century);
- Nicolò, son of Paolo, appointed imperial vicar, minted coins at the city mint in the 11th century, as cited by Gaetano Maccà in his work Della Zecca Vicentina, 1802;
- Eugenio, son of Nicolò, lived 48 years. Exiled from Vicenza in 1054, he may be the possible progenitor of the Trissino da Lodi family.
- Enrico, son of Olderico, "served under Rodolfo, son of Emperor Henry";
- Olderico II, son of Teobaldo, hosted Frederick Barbarossa on 3 November 1154, who confirmed the lordship over the lands of the Valle dell'Agno and the title of count;
- Olderico III, son of Uguccione, the first figure with recognized primary documentary evidence.

=== Middle Ages ===
The first family member with historical evidence from primary sources was Olderico (Olderico III according to the family historiography compiled by Parmenione Trissino), son of Uguccione. It is documented that Olderico was among the Vicentine nobles who received the oath of allegiance from the Commune of Bassano in 1175. According to a study analyzing the rapid economic growth in the second half of the 12th century driven by the Trissino family, it is hypothesized that Olderico may have been the founder of the village that is now the city of Valdagno.

Based on the oldest documents available today, it appears that around the year 1000, power in the Valle dell'Agno was managed solely by ecclesiastical entities, such as the Vicentine diocesan chancery and the Veronese monasteries of San Zeno and Santa Maria in Organo. The Trissino family’s skill likely lay in their ability to navigate between major powers (Empire and Church) to increase their influence. By the 11th century, it is plausible that they were part of the Vicentine curia vassallorum. The earliest recorded episcopal investiture received by the Trissino family dates to 1219, referencing an earlier one, likely granted by Bishop Pistore to Olderico in the second half of the 12th century. Feudal investitures included extensive rights and jurisdictions, such as tax collection, justice administration, appointment of deans, and grazing rights. The fact that Grifolino, son of Olderico, is mentioned in the 1208 Building Decree, cited by Giovanni da Schio, as the owner of the turris domus grandis near the Vicenza Cathedral (the same area where Palazzo Trissino al Duomo was built three centuries later), may further testify to the close, even political, ties between the Trissino family and the diocesan chancery.

Olderico married Chiara of San Bonifacio from Verona, a member of one of the city’s leading families, evidence of the strong relationships forged by the Trissino family with representatives of imperial powers (at that time, Verona was the capital of the March of Verona, a subdivision of the Holy Roman Empire encompassing the Triveneto region). From Chiara, Olderico had eight children, four of whom are considered progenitors or colonels of their respective branches:

- Miglioranza (Miglioranza branch);
- Paninsacco (Paninsacco branch);
- Arnoaldo (Dalla Pietra branch);
- Corrado (Castelmaggiore branch).

The latter two participated only marginally in Vicenza’s political life: the Castelmaggiore branch became extinct with Corrado’s four children (13th century), while the Dalla Pietra branch is known only until the 15th century (with Bugamante, Giacomo, and Pierantonio, sons of Antonio di Giacomo).

The castles in the Trissino area during the 11th–13th centuries are attributed to these family branches:

- Castel Maggiore to the eponymous branch, located on the summit of Monte San Nicolò, with remnants still visible today; upon the extinction of this colonel in 1284, its fiefs and assets were divided between the Paninsacco and Dalla Pietra branches;
- Castel Antico to the Paninsacco branch, identified on the Colle dell’Angelo, where the Trissino cemetery now stands, more recently called Bastie;
- Castel della Pietra to the eponymous branch, corresponding to the area of the current Villa Trissino Marzotto; in 1427, upon the extinction of this branch with Giacomo Trissino della Pietra, the castle and lands passed to Nicolò il Grande, son of Cristoforo Trissino of the Miglioranza branch.

Other medieval castles built in the Valle dell'Agno and associated with the Trissino family include:

- The Paninsacco castle, located on the eponymous hill above Valdagno, from the late 12th century, of which only traces of the walls and the adjacent church of Santa Maria di Paninsacco remain; built in 1212, originally incorporated into the castle itself, located in Maglio di Sopra, strategically overlooking the Agno stream valley, and witnessing the Guelph-Ghibelline conflicts in which many Trissino members were involved;
- The Valdagno castle, located between San Clemente and Contrà Castello, of which nothing remains, belonged to Miglioranza Trissino, a Ghibelline and elder brother of Paninsacco, a Guelph;
- The Brogliano castle, about which little and fragmentary information exists and which disappeared early;
- The Quargnenta castle, mentioned in the diploma granted by Frederick II to the Trissino family in 1236;
- The Castelgomberto castle, referenced as early as the diploma of Otto III around the year 1000;
- The Cornedo castle, also belonging to the Trissino Miglioranza branch, cited in Otto III’s imperial diploma and later granted as a fief by the bishops of Vicenza; in Cornedo was the country villa of Gian Giorgio Trissino, a descendant of Miglioranza.

None of these castles survived intact beyond the 14th century.

Until the 13th century, the Trissino family’s seigneurial prerogatives amounted to absolute control over the territory, exercising authority over people and property and managing their fiefs almost as an autonomous small state, thanks to their own army and feudal rights covering key aspects of inhabitants’ lives: water, mills, grazing, and markets. However, the assets described in Olderico’s 1212 will were divided only between the two main colonels of the family: Miglioranza, a Ghibelline, and Paninsacco, a Guelph. In the Middle Ages, the Trissino family, managing a substantial collection of lands, castles, fields, forests, tithing rights, etc., agreed on the communal use among the various family branches to better preserve their holdings. For example, in 1343, sixteen Trissino household heads (consortes) were recorded as jointly holding a single episcopal fief. To preserve the patrimony, the sense of a single lineage (domus et progenies) took precedence over personal disputes or political alignments. Despite being adversaries, supporting the Guelphs and Ghibellines respectively, brothers Paninsacco and Miglioranza Trissino signed an agreement on 21 December 1224, binding also for their children and successors, stipulating that all sites suitable for fortresses, tithes, and other feudal rights were to be held and used jointly by the two colonels.

Against the backdrop of the 13th-century events that saw the dominance of the Paduan Guelphs in Vicenza, followed by the Veronese Ghibellines from 1312 to 1387 with the rise and fall of the powerful Ezzelino family and the subsequent rise of the Della Scala, Miglioranza, Paninsacco, and their respective families did not refrain from fighting, aligning with opposing factions. In 1230, Paninsacco Trissino rebelled against the ban of the Vicenza podestà and barricaded himself in his castle. The following year, the municipal army stormed the fortress, and Paninsacco was stripped of his assets. Later, the Miglioranza branch faced a similar fate when, in 1236, they were banished from the city, and their urban tower-houses were looted.

In 1262, the so-called War of Valdagno broke out, during which the young Miglioranza Trissino saw his castle stormed, was banished, and forced to retreat to Verona at the monastery of Santa Maria in Organo, where his father, Miglioranza the elder, also exiled, had died in 1260. Later, in the conflict against the Paninsacco branch, in 1291, Enrico Trissino Miglioranza was defeated and beheaded, ending the war. However, at the dawn of the 14th century, under Scaliger domination, Morando Trissino Paninsacco was defeated by the Veronese Ghibellines and stripped of his fief.

Meanwhile, in 1231, Bishop Manfredo of Vicenza confirmed the Trissino family as lords of their lands, by virtue of a prior papal privilege granted by Pope Urban III. Furthermore, with a diploma dated 4 April 1236, Frederick II not only reaffirmed the Trissino family’s titles but also granted them the use of the imperial double-headed eagle in their coat of arms, in recognition of their loyalty to the Empire during those events.

The wars and shifting alliances ultimately did not undermine the Trissino family’s dominance in their valley, though they transformed into urban aristocrats. The most significant exception occurred during the brief Visconti domination at the end of the 14th century, during which the Trissino family (including Gian Giorgio, grandfather of Gian Giorgio Trissino) had to reconquer their lands, fighting the occupiers led by the condottiero Niccolò Piccinino.

Socially, despite the repeated feudal concessions, from the late 13th century, the emerging communal autonomies of rural communities began to limit the absolute power of lords. Valdagno, Cornedo, and Trissino – like Vicenza itself – established forms of local governance that increasingly negotiated on equal terms with the Trissino consortes in managing territorial rights, typically cultivation and grazing. This phenomenon was fully realized a century later, following the devastating consequences across the Vicentine territory of continuous wars (with Verona and Padua initially, then against the Visconti lords of Milan) as well as plagues and famines at the end of the 14th century.

=== From the Renaissance to the late 18th century ===
From Paninsacco Trissino, who lived in the 13th century, descends the Trissino Paninsacco branch, whose descendants still inhabit the eponymous villa in the municipality of Trissino – one of the rare cases in Veneto where a noble residence has remained in the same family’s ownership for centuries.

The elder brother Miglioranza, who married Anna Porto and later Caterina Vivaro, is the common ancestor of other Trissino branches that developed in subsequent centuries, namely:

- Trissino di Riale (named after the district in Vicenza where their palace was located), extinct by the end of the 18th century;
- Trissino Baston (whose palace on Corso Palladio in Vicenza serves as the town hall), extinct by the mid-19th century;
- Trissino di Sandrigo (descendants of Lodovico di Bartolomeo, who married Angela Verlato, daughter of Pietro, a landowner in that area, in 1435), extinct when the last member, Irene di Giustino, married Gaetano Trissino dal Vello d'Oro in 1712;
- Trissino dal Vello d'Oro, an addition to the surname authorized in 1515 by Maximilian I for Gian Giorgio, the renowned poet and humanist, a branch still extant.

Based on documents in the Trissino dal Vello d'Oro Archive at the Biblioteca Civica Bertoliana, the following family tree can be reconstructed:

Olderico m. Chiara di San Bonifacio
Miglioranza m. Anna Porto and then Caterina Vivaro	Paninsacco
Achille m. Bellicia da Arzignano and then Anna Valmarana	branch Trissino Paninsacco (extant)
Bonifacio m. Cardìna Valmarana
Gaetano m. Singrofina
Bonifacio m. Antonia Trissino	Ludovico
Giovanni Giorgio m. Benedetta Zilotti and then Elisabetta Thiene	branches Trissino Baston and Trissino Riale (extinct)
Bartolomeo m. Filippa Parotto
Giovan Giorgio m. Isabella Savorgnano	Ludovico m. Angela Verlato
Gaspare m. Cecilia Bevilacqua	branch Trissino di Sandrigo (extinct)
Gian Giorgio m. Giovanna Trissino and then Bianca Trissino
branch Trissino dal Vello d'Oro (extant)

Only the descendants of Gian Giorgio Trissino dal Vello d'Oro used the full surname with the nobiliary particle, while members of other Trissino branches always signed with the simple surname without any title, sometimes making it challenging to accurately identify familial connections when given names were repeated across branches.

On 28 April 1404, the city of Vicenza voluntarily submitted to the Republic of Venice, and on 3 September 1406, the Doge Michele Steno confirmed the Trissino family as counts, knights, and lords of the lands of the Valle di Trissino and the fiefs subsequently added, although landed properties, tithes, and minor jurisdictions had to be repurchased.

==== Economic development ====
The entry into the so-called Domini di Terraferma brought a period of relative peace and prosperity to the Venetian inland territories under the Serenissima, lasting much of the 15th century until the events of the League of Cambrai. This, combined with the great availability of land and resources, prompted the Trissino family to innovate agricultural activities, then focused on cereal cultivation, by expanding irrigated meadows, extending vineyards on hillsides, and promoting sheep farming, including through alpine pasturing. Additionally, other activities developed in the countryside of the Valle di Trissino, such as sawmills for wood processing, mining and ironworking, millstone production, wool processing, and, from the 16th century, silk production at the Villa della Colombara in Trissino.

The economic and cultural renaissance that followed contributed to the transformation of feudal families, like the Trissino, from lords wielding significant power to patricians, primarily landowners whose rights were now almost exclusively economic. The Renaissance saw the Trissino family focused on maintaining their privileged positions (many members of various branches served as Judges of the College between the 16th and 18th centuries).

At that time, preserving such substantial patrimony and passing it down through generations was a priority, often through cousin marriages to keep it within the family. The institution of the fideicommissum was frequently used for this purpose: wills often stipulated the subsequent devolution of the patrimony, typically favouring another family branch if the testator’s heir had no descendants.

==== Civil and religious buildings ====
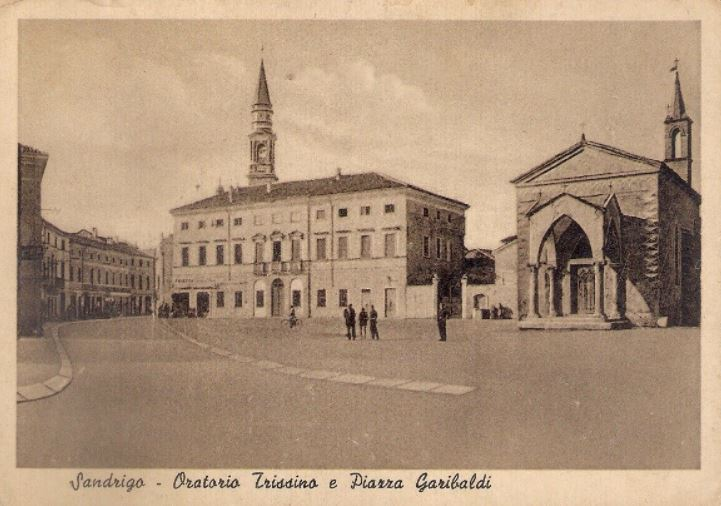
Sandrigo, Piazza Garibaldi with the oratory built by the Trissino family.

Numerous buildings, country villas, and city palaces reflected the family’s power and wealth: Palazzo Trissino al Duomo (16th century) and Palazzo Trissino Baston (17th century), both designed by Vincenzo Scamozzi; the two Trissino Villas in Cornedo Vicentino; Villa Trissino in Castelgomberto (15th century); Villa Trissino in Vicenza (16th century), where the humanist Gian Giorgio Trissino met the young Andrea Palladio; Villa Trissino Paninsacco in Trissino (16th century); the unfinished Palladian Villa Trissino in Meledo di Sarego (16th century); and, in more recent times, Villa Trissino in Montecchio Precalcino (17th century) and Villa Trissino in Sandrigo (17th–18th centuries). The Trissino family was among the Vicentine patrician families that most cultivated the arts, reaching its peak with the relationship between Gian Giorgio Trissino and Andrea Palladio.

Additionally, numerous interventions were made in religious buildings. The oldest recorded is the church of Santa Maria in Paninsacco built in 1212 by Paninsacco Trissino as an appendage to his Valdagno castle. Later, in March 1380, Niccolò Trissino il Grande inaugurated the new parish church of Valdagno, dedicated to Saint Clement, whose Conception chapel was dedicated to the family and housed his equestrian tomb until 1797.

Every town’s parish church had a chapel reserved for the Trissino family, or at least an altar, while the countryside featured chapels and oratories where various family members chose to be buried. An example is the oratory of Santa Maria Assunta in Sandrigo, built in 1610 in the town’s main square (now Piazza Garibaldi) by Canon Serrano di Alvise Trissino da Sandrigo as a family chapel. It was restored in 1843 under the supervision of Count Gian Giorgio Trissino dal Vello d'Oro by the architect Antonio Caregaro Negrin in its current Gothic style, likely using materials from the Cricoli villa, such as the columns of the external portico.

The Trissino family’s presence in the Vicenza Cathedral was equally significant, with plaques and tombs, now largely lost due to World War II bombings. Gaspare Trissino, father of Gian Giorgio, in his 1483 will donated funds for the embellishment of the sacristy and the adjacent chapel on the left side of the cathedral. Other significant traces in the city are found in the small church of Saints Philip and James in Contrà Riale (now part of the Bertoliana), in the churches of San Giuliano, Santa Corona, and San Lorenzo, the latter being the preferred church of the Trissino dal Vello d'Oro branch.

==== Men of arms ====
The Trissino family’s involvement in significant military events was consistent with the evolving political and economic circumstances, starting with the legendary founder, the Greek Achilles, son of Alcasto, who is said to have come to Italy to fight in the Gothic War (6th century) under General Belisarius.

The first Trissino members whose presence in military episodes is historically verified appear during the wars between Guelphs and Ghibellines, which, from the 12th to the 14th centuries, shaped the history of many Italian communes in defining territorial power struggles. Several Trissino family members, starting with brothers Miglioranza and Paninsacco and many of their children and grandchildren, actively participated, particularly to assert and maintain their power in Vicenza and their territories against both emerging local authorities and other seigneurial families.

In the 15th century, thanks to the period of peace and economic recovery following the reduced ambitions of the Dukes of Milan and Vicenza’s entry into the Republic of Venice (1404), the Trissino family focused more on developing productive activities in their territories than on warfare. During this period, Gian Giorgio is remembered for his successful reconquest of his fief in the Valle di Trissino, invaded by Niccolò Piccinino on behalf of the Visconti, and his son Gaspare (1448–1487), also a military man and colonel in the service of the Serenissima. They were, respectively, the grandfather and father of the humanist Gian Giorgio Trissino dal Vello d'Oro.

In the 16th century, Leonardo Trissino's story is documented (1467–1511), son of Bartolomeo, who, fleeing Vicenza after being accused of murder, came into contact with the court of Emperor Maximilian I. On his behalf, during the military maneuvers related to the League of Cambrai, Leonardo occupied Schio, Vicenza, Treviso, and Padua with a small personal army in 1509. Defeated by a stratagem of the Doge’s army, his adventure ended within a few months, and he died in prison in Venice.

Significant was the participation in the Battle of Lepanto by Giacomo Trissino (1541–1571), son of Conte, commanding one of the two galleys funded by the city of Vicenza, L'Uomo Marino. The Venetian ships were the first in the Christian fleet to engage the Ottoman fleet, setting the course for the epic battle, in which Giacomo, like many other Venetians, sacrificed his life.

During the Eighty Years' War (16th–17th centuries), several Trissino members, especially younger sons, served as condottieri for the Catholic Emperor against the Protestant rebels of the United Provinces of the Netherlands. The first notable figure is Marcantonio Trissino dal Vello d'Oro (1564–1604), second son of Ciro, banished from Vicenza for stabbing Giulio Cesare Trissino in 1583, the alleged murderer of his father. This episode was part of a feud among some family branches after Gian Giorgio Trissino named his second-born son, Ciro, as universal heir, bypassing the firstborn, Archpriest Giulio. For his skills, Marcantonio was appointed military advisor and superintendent of fortresses in Flanders by the governor of the Spanish Netherlands, Archduke Albert VII of Austria. He died heroically on 21 August 1604, during the siege of Ostend.

Also, Attila, second son of Giovan Battista and younger brother of Galeazzo, the commissioner of Palazzo Trissino al Corso, served the Habsburgs, fighting fiercely in Belgium during the conflicts for the independence of the Protestant United Provinces against the Catholic Spanish government. He died in 1606, and his body was transported to Vicenza for burial in the family chapel. Finally, brothers Alessandro and Francesco Trissino are worthy of mention, sons of Francesco di Antonio, both captains in the Habsburg army and buried in 1689 in the church of Saints Philip and James in Vicenza.

==== Saints and venerables ====
Unlike most aristocratic families, the Trissino family does not boast prominent churchmen, but several women stand out, a remarkable fact for an medieval dynasty. Among the men, apart from Giulio (1504–1576), the firstborn of the humanist Gian Giorgio, who became archpriest of the Vicenza cathedral, it is possible to cite only a few Somaschi Fathers who managed that church after it was entrusted to their order in 1603. Among them, Gaspare Trissino (16th–17th centuries), son of Count Ulieno and Ottavia Trento, stands out. He took vows in 1604 and was appointed provost of Saints Philip and James. Upon his mother’s death, a bequest enabled significant works to embellish the Trissino chapel, the third on the right, where Ottavia is presumed to have been buried. A scholar of letters, Gaspare wrote a Latin booklet on the life of Saint Savina Trissino, translated Gian Giorgio Trissino’s tragedy Sophonisba into Latin, and translated the manuscript Trissinae Familiae Monumentarium into Italian. He died in Trento in 1630.

Among the women, the starting point is a saint whose legend spans the 3rd and 4th centuries. Savina Trissino was a wealthy widow who devoted herself to charitable works, particularly for Christians persecuted under emperors Diocletian and Maximian. She cared for Nabor and Felix, two Roman soldiers who, having embraced the Christian faith, were beheaded near Laus Pompeia (modern Lodi Vecchio) in 303. Savina comforted them in prison and later hid their bodies after their martyrdom. According to legend, wishing to bring them to Milan, Savina placed their bodies in a barrel. When stopped by tax collectors, she declared the barrel contained wine or honey. Miraculously, the soldiers found such contents, allowing her to enter the city, where Bishop Maternus gave them a proper burial. Saint Savina died in Milan on 30 January 311, and her body is preserved at the eponymous altar in the Basilica of Sant'Ambrogio. The Catholic Church commemorates her on 30 January, and her deeds were recorded by Gaspare Trissino, a Somaschi father, and more recently by Francesco Trissino. Key moments of her life are depicted in a frieze painted around 1665 by Giulio Carpioni (1613–1678), decorating the Council Chamber at Palazzo Trissino, formerly called the Saint Savina Room.

Returning to the church of Saints Philip and James in Vicenza, the 1624 painting Apparition of the Angel to Saint Savina, attributed to Marcantonio Maganza, adorns the left wall of the Trissino chapel. On the right wall is the composition The Three Venerables of the Trissino House: Sulpizia, Febronia, and Vittoria, painted by Francesco Maffei between 1630 and 1640.

Sulpizia is believed to be the mother of brothers Felix and Fortunatus, born in Vicenza and martyred in Aquileia in 303 during the purges of Christians from the Roman army. They are recognized by the Church as saints and martyrs. Felix’s body is preserved in the Basilica of Saints Felix and Fortunatus in Vicenza, while Fortunatus’s, after initial burials in Aquileia, Grado, and Malamocco, was transferred in 1080 under Doge Ordelaffo Falier (whose daughter Anna married the noble Teobaldo Trissino) to Chioggia, where he became the patron saint.

Febronia, born Elisabetta, was the younger sister of Gian Giorgio Trissino. She took vows and entered the Monastery of San Pietro in Vicenza in 1495. From 1518, alongside her fellow nun Domicilla Thiene, she revitalized the Monastery of San Silvestro, founded before the 9th century.

Finally, the venerable Vittoria, born Sigismonda, was a Franciscan tertiary in the 16th century at the convent of San Domenico in Vicenza.

== Family conflicts ==
In the 16th century, disputes involving the numerous Trissino family members in Vicenza became increasingly common, as they sought dominance over other families, such as the Valmarana, and even among different branches of their own lineage. The issue of power and inheritance was so significant that the preference given by Gian Giorgio Trissino dal Vello d’Oro to his son from his second marriage, Ciro, over his firstborn, Giulio, the archpriest of Vicenza Cathedral, sparked a prolonged and bitter conflict between the relatives of Gian Giorgio’s first wife, Giovanna Trissino, and the descendants of the dal Vello d’Oro branch, with even tragic repercussions.

Despite his prominent ecclesiastical role, Giulio had been drawn to Calvinist ideas, challenging the authority and values of his father, Gian Giorgio, who, like most aristocrats of his time, supported the Catholic Emperor. Following a heated argument, on the evening of 25 January 1533, Giulio, accompanied by about ten friends, stormed his father’s villa in Cornedo, looting it and threatening his stepmother, Bianca. Gian Giorgio increasingly distanced himself from his firstborn and, in his final will of 1549, named Ciro as his universal heir, possibly also to avoid potential reprisals from the Holy Office. He publicly denounced Giulio’s unorthodox ideas, definitively cutting ties with him.

Giulio, after his legal battle with his father, also dragged his half-brother Ciro into court, instigated by his uncles Galeazzo and Giovanni. Several petitions to the authorities exacerbated the conflict with his father and, after Gian Giorgio’s death, with his brother. Consequently, Ciro decided to eliminate his half-brother by formally denouncing his reformist sympathies to the authorities. The Holy Office’s rulings in the 1550s definitively sentenced Giulio to imprisonment in 1573, where he died in 1577.

The feud escalated in 1576 when Giulio Cesare Trissino, Giovanna’s grandson (and Giulio’s nephew), organized the assassination of Ciro as retribution for his denunciation of Giulio. On 4 February, armed men broke into Ciro’s home in Cornedo and brutally stabbed him in front of his young son, Marcantonio.

Marcantonio Trissino dal Vello d’Oro, upon reaching adulthood, resolved to avenge his father, also seeking to redeem Ciro’s dishonorable act of betrayal. On Good Friday 1583, as Giulio Cesare exited Vicenza Cathedral, Marcantonio stabbed him to death, despite the protection of his armed guards. The following year, Marcantonio was sentenced to exile. He bequeathed his possessions to his brother Pompeo and joined the imperial army, distinguishing himself in the Eighty Years' War. He died on 21 August 1604, during the siege of Ostend, struck, ironically, by the fire of Protestants like his uncle Giulio, whom his family opposed.

Another act of retaliation came from Ranuccio di Cristoforo Trissino, another adversary of the Trissino dal Vello d’Oro branch. In December 1588, he broke into the home of Pompeo, Ciro’s firstborn, and stabbed Pompeo’s wife, Isabella Bissari, and their infant son, Marcantonio, killing both. For this heinous crime, Ranuccio Trissino was sentenced to beheading.

More recently, the fact that the last Trissino of Sandrigo, brothers Giustino (died 1706) and Roberto (died 1708), named their daughter and niece Irene (1694–1758) as their universal heir (thus bearing a dowry that included the villa and lands in Sandrigo and Palazzo Civena Trissino in Vicenza), who later married Gaetano Trissino dal Vello d’Oro, enraged their distant cousin Pietro di Anton Maria, the closest male in terms of genealogical relation. Pietro pursued a decades-long lawsuit against Irene and her mother, Lodovica Garzadori, as the ancient entail, established seven generations earlier, reserved these assets for the family’s male line.

== Politics ==
Most aristocratic families in the Venetian hinterland during the 16th century supported the Empire, even during the events surrounding the League of Cambrai, despite the wars that followed, which, with the invasion of the Serenissima’s territories, endangered their vast rural estates. The Trissino family was no exception.

Two episodes illustrate this. The first involves Leonardo Trissino, born in 1467 to Count Bartolomeo, about whom little is known until he fled to Trent after being accused of murder. There, he met Paolo di Liechtenstein, a Tyrolean prince, who granted him access to the court of Emperor Maximilian I of Habsburg. A friendship developed between them, and in 1509, Leonardo organized a small personal army and invaded the Venetian plain in the Emperor’s name, after the latter was denied passage through the Serenissima’s territories the previous year to travel to Rome for his papal coronation.

With his hundred soldiers and ten knights, Leonardo occupied Schio, Vicenza, Verona, and Padua within weeks, facing little resistance. He gained the support of the nobility, but the populace remained loyal to Venice. On 16 July, Andrea Gritti led a Venetian contingent that pretended to deliver wheat to the starving population in an attempt to enter the city, and the stratagem succeeded. Leonardo’s venture ended, and he was imprisoned, dying in Venetian prisons in 1511.

Another episode concerns Gian Giorgio Trissino, who supported the Empire as an ideal institution derived from the Roman Empire he admired. However, given the times, this was interpreted as anti-Venetian, leading to his temporary exile by the Serenissima. Upon returning, he fought a lengthy legal battle to reclaim the tithes from his rural properties. Taking advantage of the wars and the count’s exile, peasants had suspended payments and sought legal recognition of this de facto state. The tithe issue, ongoing for centuries, was a major source of friction between the Trissino family and the valley’s communities, sometimes leading to the killing of unfortunate tax collectors or defiant debtors. Both the peasants and Gian Giorgio submitted petitions to Venice to support their claims. The poet’s oratorical skills persuaded Doge Andrea Gritti more effectively than his opponents, with the famous Oration to the Most Serene Prince of Venice, securing his victory.

Over the subsequent centuries, Europe’s evolving social structure strained relations between aristocrats and the populace, sometimes erupting into violence. With the fall of the Serenissima in 1797 (due to the Napoleonic troops’ entry into Italy), nearly all Trissino insignia on houses and churches in Valdagno were removed. The ancient tomb of Nicolò Trissino the Great from the 1400s in the church of San Clemente was dismantled, its materials used to erect the Tree of Liberty, a key symbol of the Third Estate’s redemption against the aristocracy during the French Revolution. In 1848, the Trissino coat of arms was even removed from their family chapel’s arch in San Clemente, as its double-headed imperial eagle too closely resembled that of the hated Habsburg enemy.

With the post-Napoleonic political stabilization, the Vicenza territories were incorporated into the Lombard-Venetian Kingdom, ruled by the Habsburgs. The four remaining Trissino family branches received confirmation of their noble titles from the imperial Austrian government through a Sovereign Resolution of 1820. After the annexation of Veneto to the Kingdom of Italy in 1866, the noble titles of the pre-unification states were recognized, and the Trissino family appears in the most widely circulated lists.

== Recent history ==
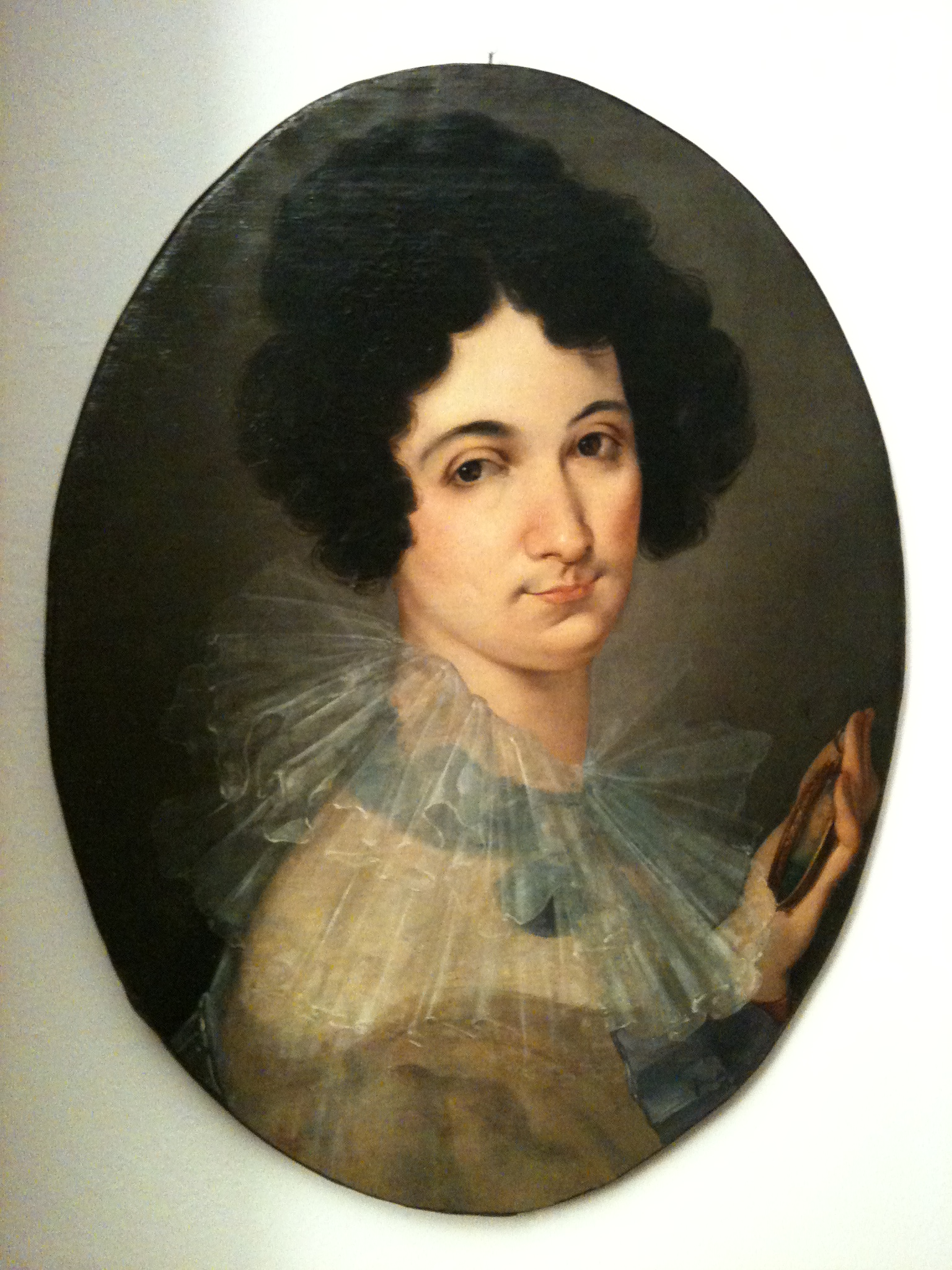
Teresa Brignole Trissino dal Vello d’Oro (1798–1824).

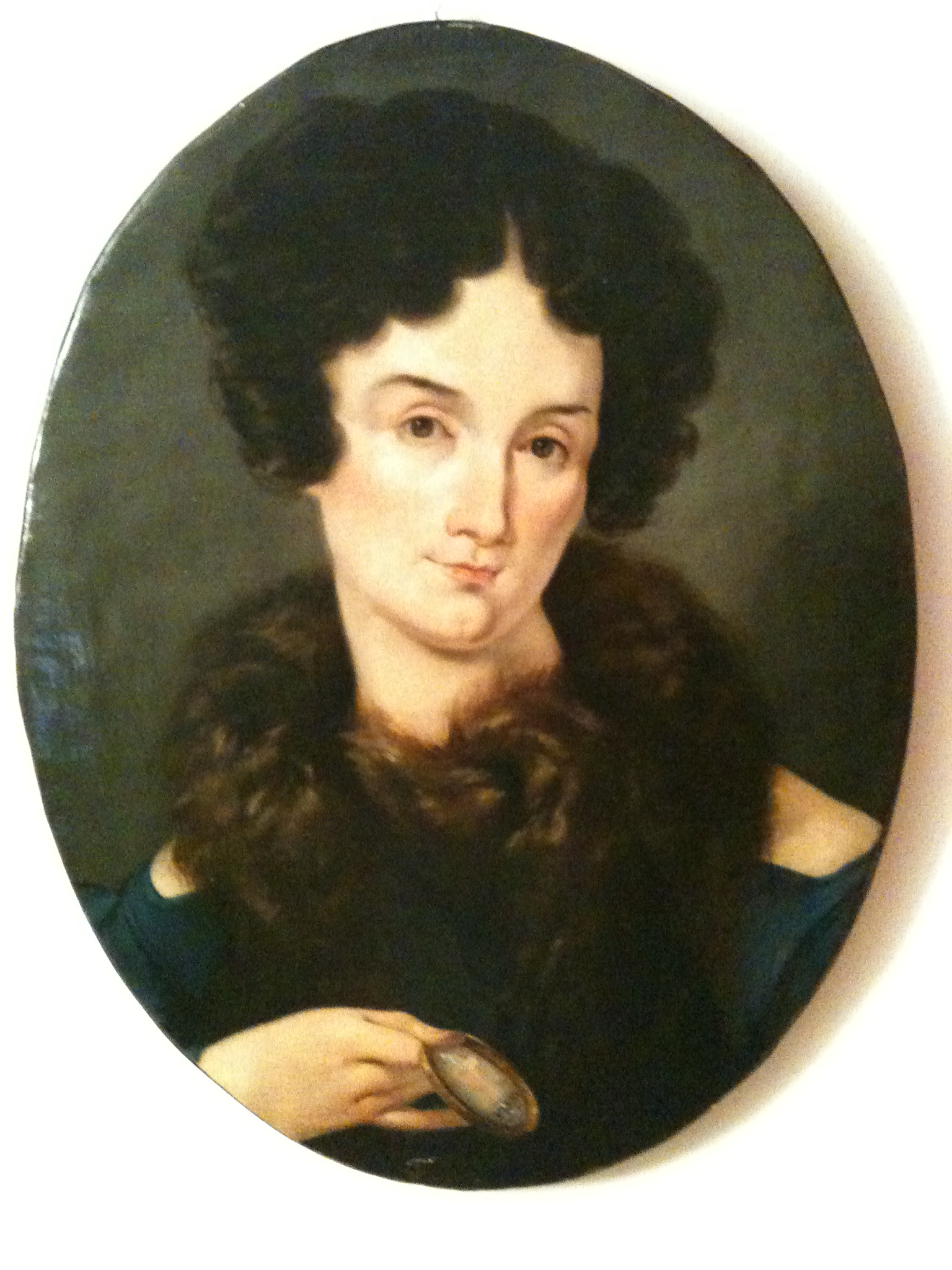
Angiola Brignole Trissino dal Vello d’Oro (1802–1830).

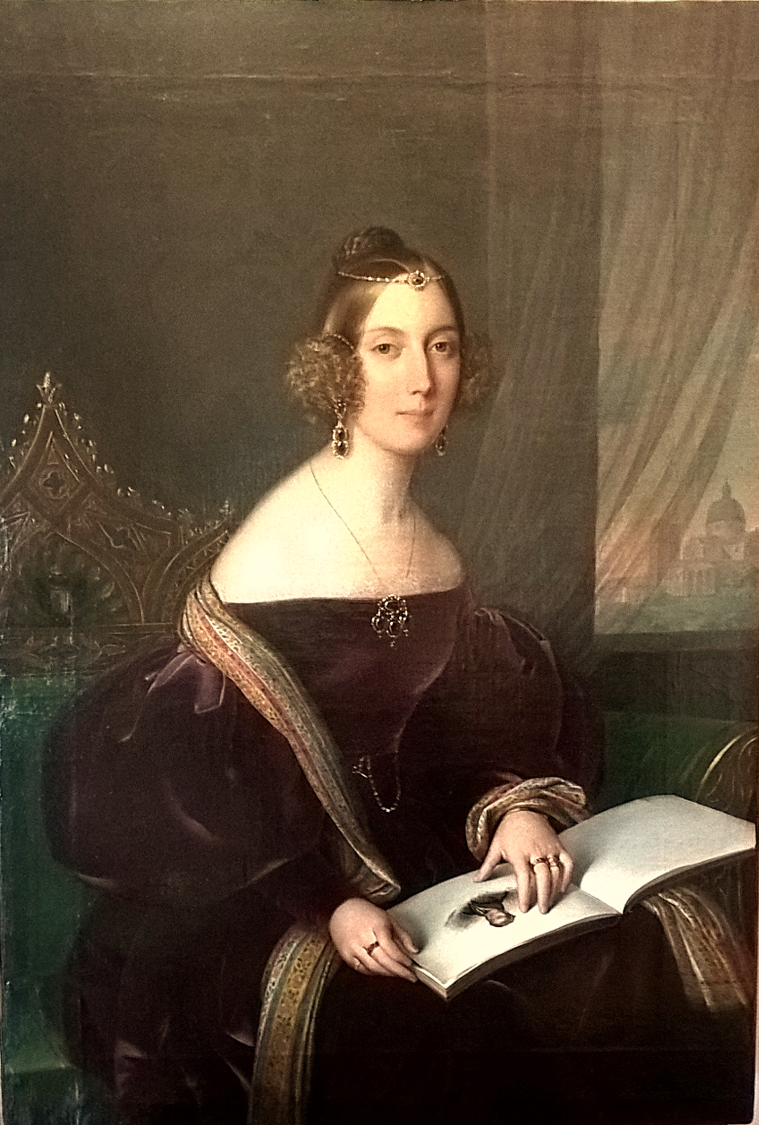
Portrait of Marianna d’Ambra Trissino dal Vello d’Oro (1812–1836) by Giovanni Busato (1806–1886) in 1836.

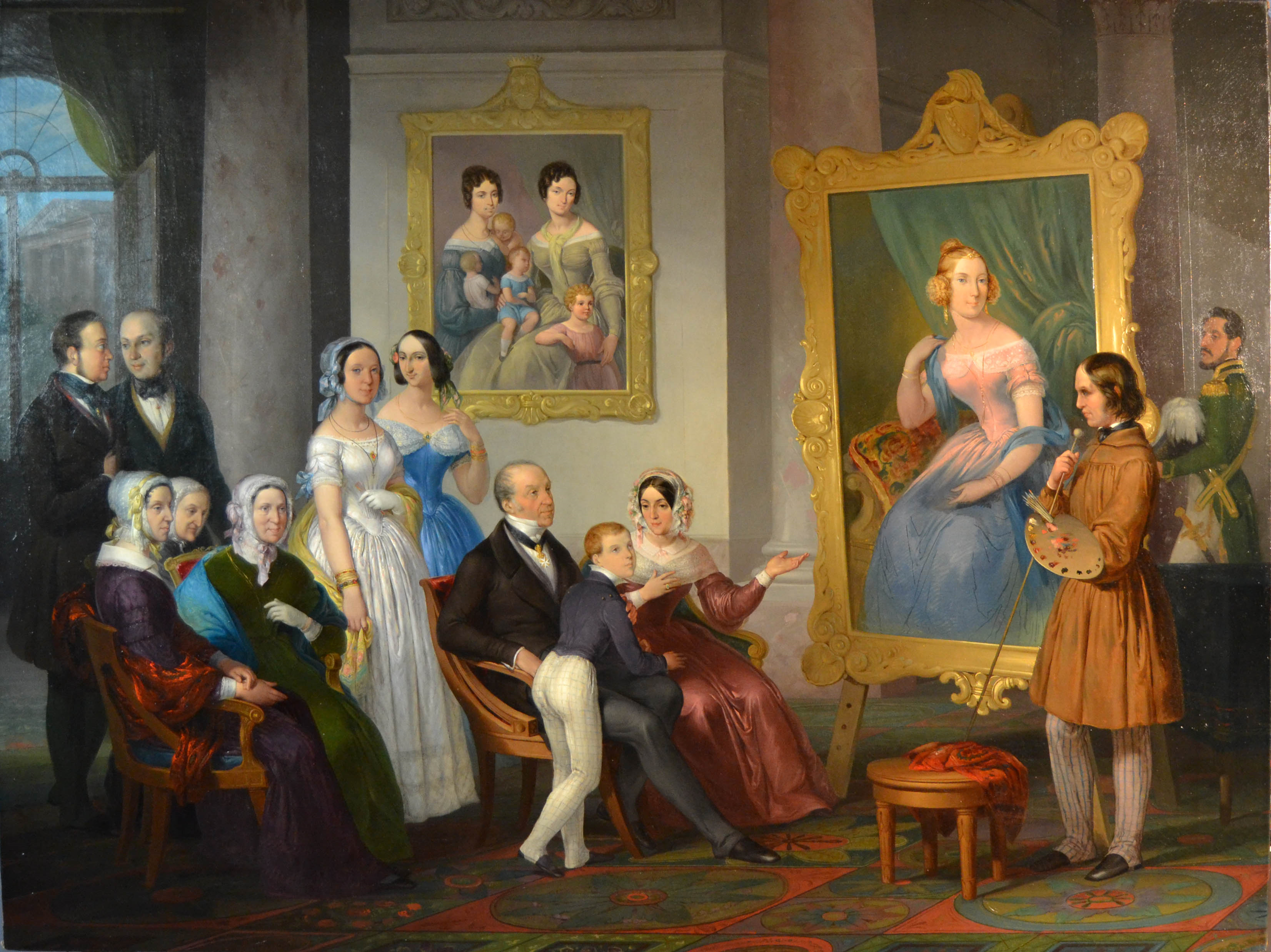
Presentation of Marianna d’Ambra’s portrait to the family of her husband, Gian Giorgio Trissino dal Vello d’Oro, by Giovanni Busato.

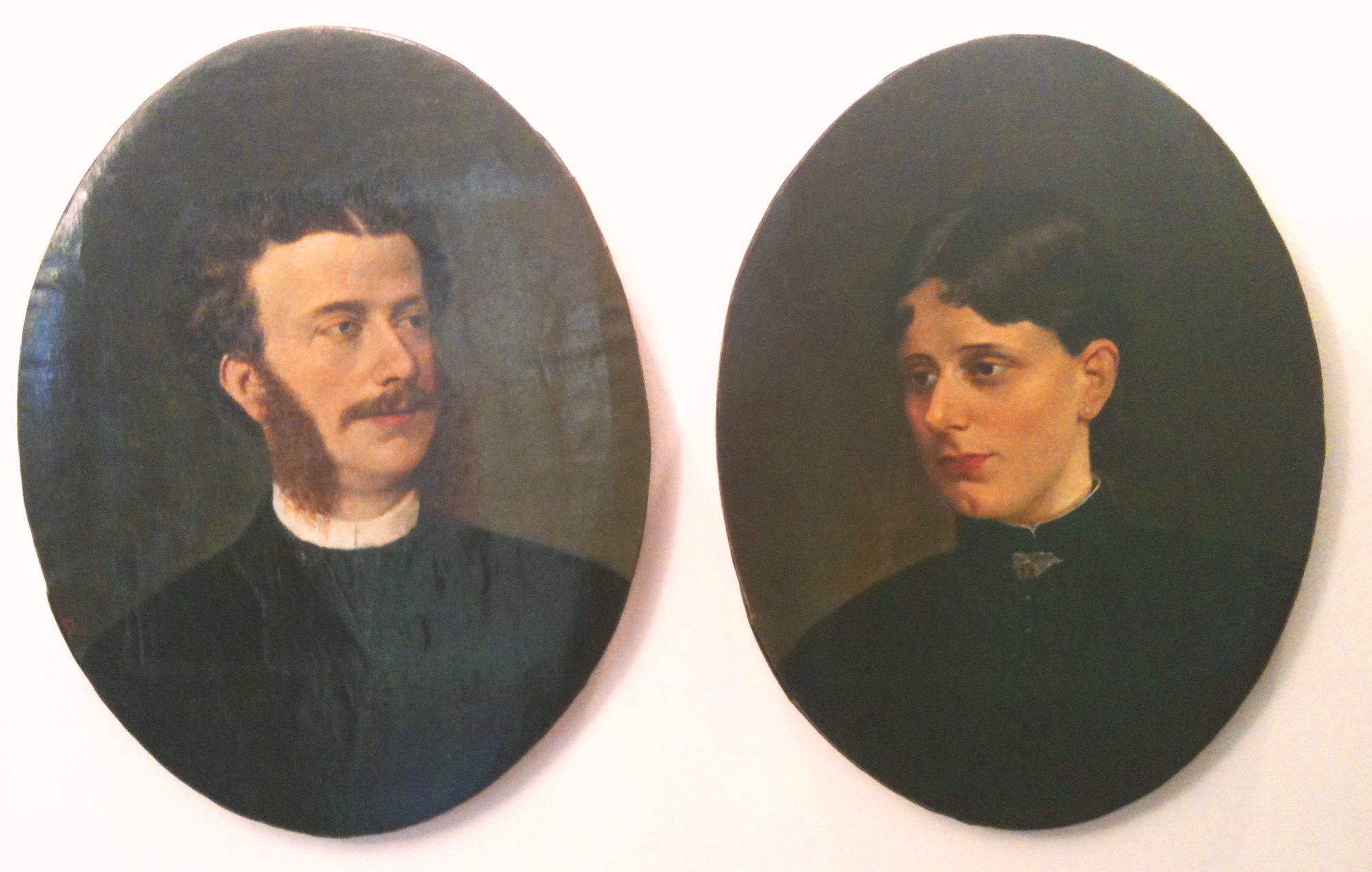
Portraits of Gian Giorgio Trissino dal Vello d’Oro (1835–1910) and his wife Elena di Thiene (1846–1917) by Vittorio Pittaco.

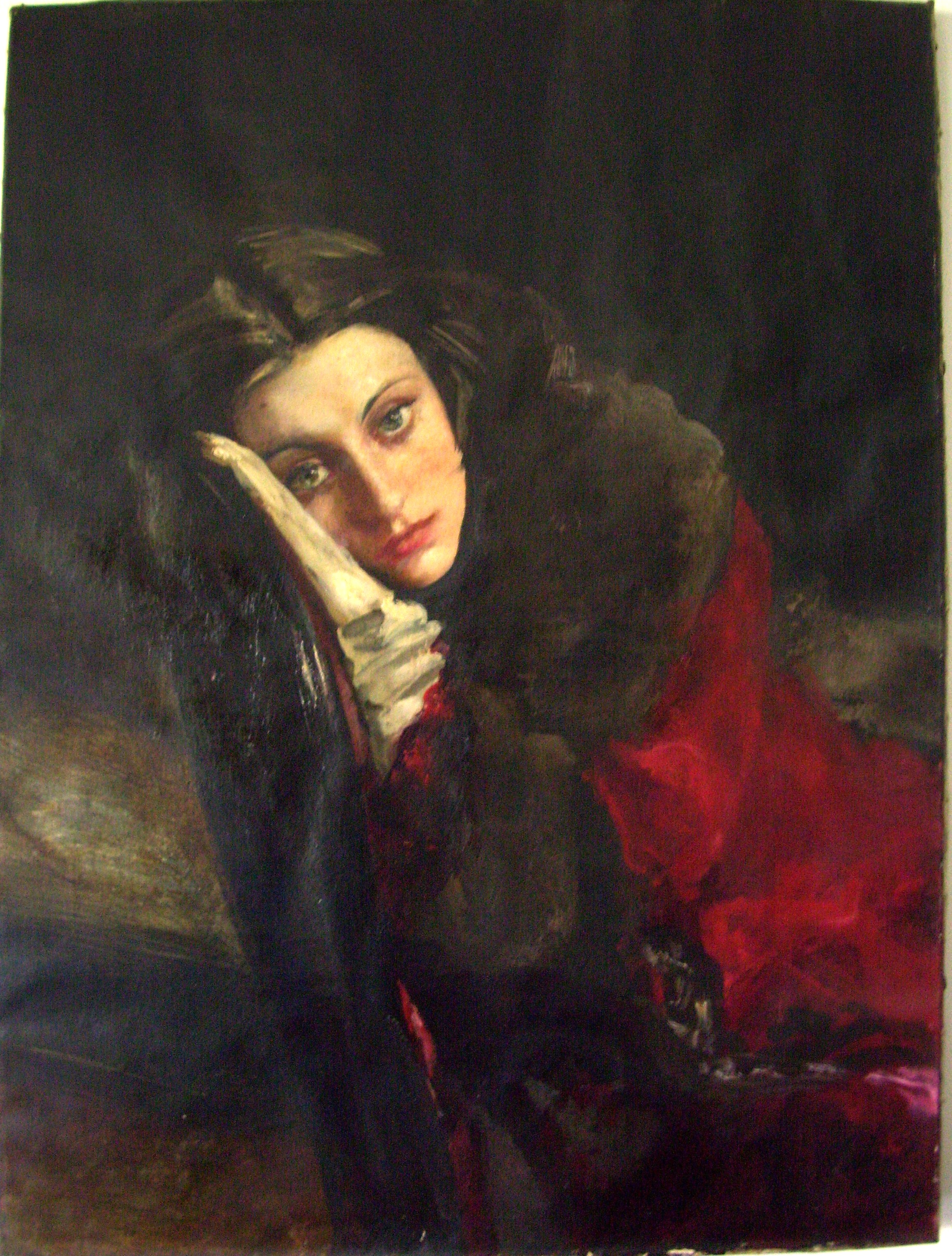
Portrait of a young Luisa Marzotto (1911–1985), painted by Guido Tallone, Milan, 1927.

Of the many Trissino family branches, only four survived into the 19th century; only the Trissino Paninsacco and Trissino dal Vello d’Oro branches reached the 20th century and remain extant today.

The Trissino dal Vello d’Oro branch is linked to the story of Gian Giorgio (Vicenza, 17 October 1772 – Florence, 6 February 1855), son of Count Teodoro (died 1806) and Elena Porto Barbaran (died 1805), a direct descendant of the poet of the same name. His life was marked by profound tragedy due to family events tied to his marriages and attempts to secure an heir for the lineage.

As recounted in the verses of Giuseppe Bombardini, on 23 March 1822, at an already advanced age, Gian Giorgio married Teresa (1798–1824), daughter of marquess Francesco Brignole (died 31 December 1828) and Maddalena Pareto (died 1808). The couple had a daughter, Elena, who died shortly after birth, and a son, Teodoro, who died at age two in 1825, after Teresa succumbed to tuberculosis in 1824.

On 26 September 1827, Gian Giorgio remarried Teresa’s younger sister, Angiola (1802–1830), who met a similar fate. She gave birth to a daughter who lived only a few days, and a son who survived only moments after Angiola’s death due to childbirth complications on 8 January 1830.

Niccolò Gervasoni’s Giurisprudenza dell’eccellentissimo Regio Senato di Genova details the peculiar legal dispute involving Count Gian Giorgio Trissino after his father-in-law’s death, concerning the distribution of Francesco Brignole’s estate among his heirs and creditors. Gian Giorgio claimed credits for the incomplete payment of the dowry for each of his two wives and participated in the inheritance, as both women bore him a son, though the first lived only a few months and the second only minutes. The dispute arose from the sequence of events: Francesco Brignole’s bankruptcy (Genoa Commercial Court ruling, 4 March 1825), his death (31 December 1828), and the deaths of his daughters (1824 and 1830). At the root was the will of Francesco’s father, Marquess Giovan Battista, dated 14 August 1790, which established an entail favouring male descendants and assigning a fixed sum to females. Thus, it was critical to determine whether Angiola’s son outlived her, thereby acquiring and passing hereditary rights to his father. This was complicated by the interplay of Genoese (residence of the Brignole family), Milanese (where Francesco conducted business), and Venetian (where the Brignole marchionesses and their children died) laws. The 22 June 1838 ruling finally determined the shares for the relatives and their precedence over Francesco Brignole’s creditors.

Subsequently, Gian Giorgio married Marianna, daughter of the marquess d’Ambra, born in Florence in 1812. On 10 September 1835, Marianna gave birth to a son, also named Gian Giorgio (referred to as Giorgio or Giorgino in family writings), but she died six months later on 28 March 1836, in Vicenza due to a cholera epidemic. This time, however, her sacrifice was not in vain: her son survived, and the lineage continued.

The nobleman had his wives painted by the Vicentine Giovanni Busato, a renowned portraitist and contemporary of Francesco Hayez at the Venice Academy. A large painting, also attributed to Busato, depicts the artist presenting a draft of Marianna’s portrait to the Trissino family, with Gian Giorgio among his sisters and relatives. On the back wall of the salon at Palazzo Trissino at Ponte Furo, the portraits of the Brignole marchionesses, Gian Giorgio’s previous wives, are displayed. This painting was acquired in early 2018 by the Civic Museums of Vicenza—thanks to the efforts of the then-director, Prof. Giovanni Carlo Federico Villa—and became part of the renewed 19th-century exhibition (work No. 45).

The grief over Marianna Trissino’s death was commemorated by contemporary poets, such as the Vicentine Gaetano Podestà and the Genoese Gioacchino Ponta. The Biblioteca Bertoliana in Vicenza preserves several copies of the sonnets written to commemorate this tragic event.

A noteworthy episode concerns the participation of Gian Giorgio Trissino dal Vello d’Oro (Vicenza, 22 July 1877 – Milan, 22 December 1963), grandson of the aforementioned, in the second modern Olympic Games held in Paris in the summer of 1900, in the equestrian events. As a young second lieutenant in the “Genova Cavalleria” regiment, on 31 May, he competed in the long jump, winning the silver medal with a distance of 5.70 meters. On 2 June, in the high jump, he placed fourth with the horse Mélopo at 1.70 meters, and tied for first with the Frenchman Dominique Gardères, riding Oreste at 1.85 meters. He was thus the first Italian to win an Olympic medal and the first to win gold.

Another event involves his reaction to the granting of the comital title to the industrialist Gaetano Marzotto. On 25 May 1939, King Victor Emmanuel III conferred the title of Count of Valdagno Castelvecchio to Gaetano Marzotto (1894–1972), owner of the renowned wool industry, for the network of welfare institutions established in Italy and the colonies around the thriving Marzotto group’s businesses in Valdagno. The Consulta Araldica’s solution to assign the Marzotto family the nobiliary particle “di Valdagno Castelvecchio” to avoid interfering with the Trissino’s feudal rights was evidently unsatisfactory to Gian Giorgio Trissino, who engaged in firm correspondence with Gaetano Marzotto and filed an appeal with the Consulta Araldica. Marzotto, however, did not place great importance on this recognition, though he was certainly gratified.

The Consulta Araldica could not resolve Trissino’s grievance due to the slow progress during the war. The matter was settled by the 14th transitional provision of the Republican Constitution, which maintains and recognizes only nobiliary particles attached to titles granted before 28 October 1922, as part of the surname—clearly not applicable to the Marzotto family. However, this provision, by not recognizing noble titles, offers no legal protection in this regard: anyone could claim a title, risking only a civil lawsuit for damages by the legitimate titleholder. In practice, no one has further challenged those who continue to call the Marzotto “counts.”

Ironically, Ernesto Trissino dal Vello d’Oro (Milan, 1904–1971), Gian Giorgio’s heir, married Luisa Marzotto (Milan, 1911 – Rapallo, 1985), a descendant of Gaetano Marzotto’s great-grandfather, on 11 October 1932, in Milan.

The absence of male descendants in the second half of the 20th century led to the Trissino name being combined with other surnames to prevent its complete extinction. Today, descendants of the Trissino dal Vello d’Oro live in Milan and Gaiole in Chianti, and those of the Trissino Paninsacco branch reside in Vicenza and Trissino.

The extensive analysis and reorganization of the family archives at the Biblioteca Civica Bertoliana in Vicenza between 2008 and 2012—derived from the deposit of 12 December 1919 by Gabriella Trissino dal Vello d’Oro, and the transfer of 27 January 1932 by Alessandro and Luigi Porto—allowed the rediscovery of long-buried information, highlighting two recurring traits across Trissino generations: litigiousness and a deep sense of belonging to a common lineage. The former accounts for numerous protracted legal disputes, alliances, conflicts, and even assassinations among the “colonels” that filled centuries of history. The latter is reflected in countless agreements among cousins, strategically arranged endogamous marriages, pride in mythical ancestors sometimes exaggerated, and the ability to rally around the family in the most challenging times.

== Trissino da Lodi ==
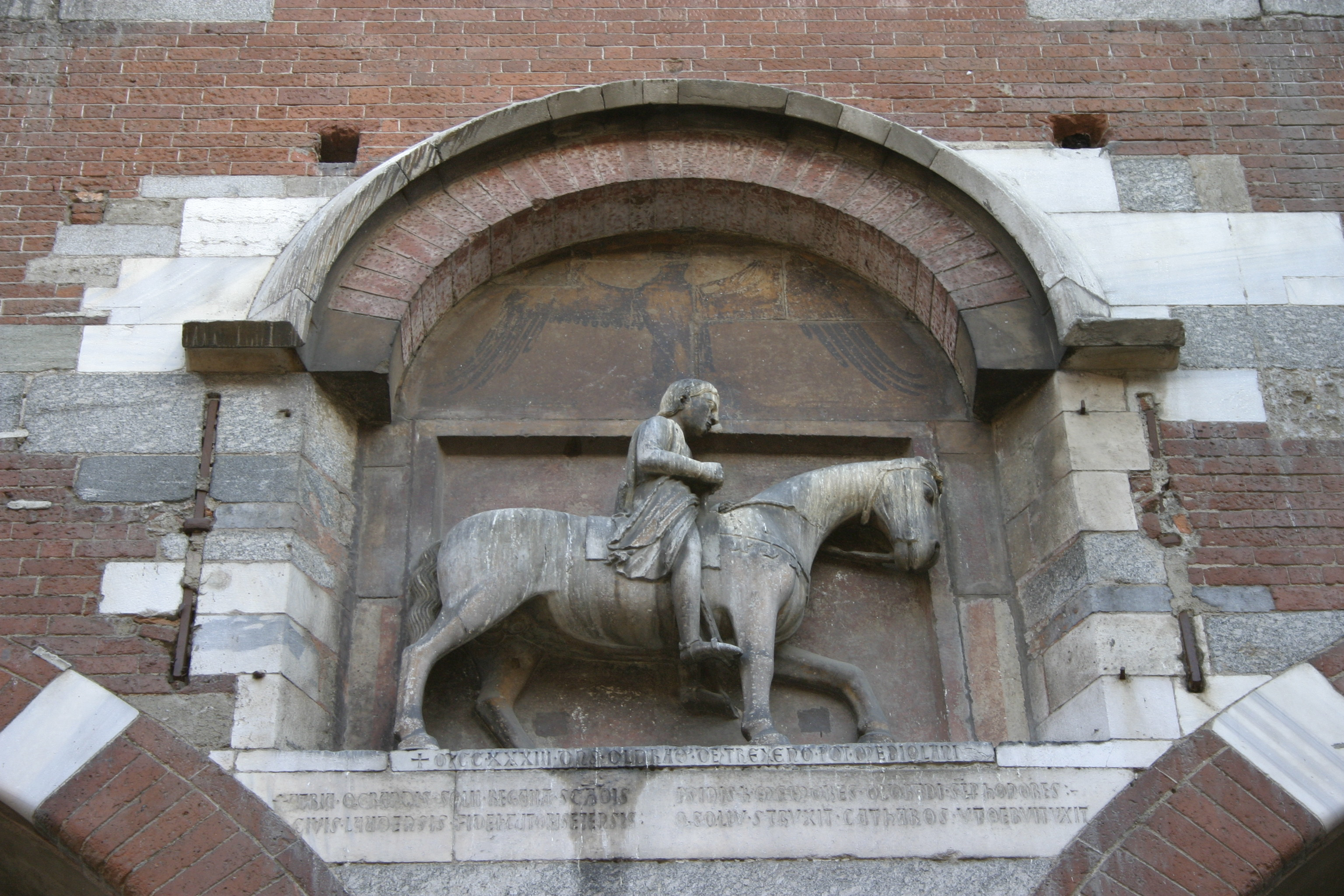
Equestrian monument to Oldrado da Tresseno, Palazzo della Ragione, Milan

Although it developed independently, the Trissino da Lodi family shares significant connections with the Vicentine Trissino, supporting the thesis of dynastic continuity. These include the unique surname, present only in these two families; the identical coat of arms with jagged diagonal bars; the veneration of Saint Savina Trissino; and the recurrence of names such as Achille and Gian Giorgio in both families.

Paolo Beni, in his Trattato dell’origine et fatti illustri della famiglia Trissina, lists among the early Trissino da Lodi a Giovanni (among the founders of the hospital in Tavazzano in 1125), Martino (who endowed the construction of the church of San Martino in Lodi in 1183), and Fanone (who completed its embellishment in 1202). The Trattato claims Martino was the progenitor of this branch but does not specify a direct connection to the Vicentine Trissino. More recently, Cesare Cantù mentions a Eugenio Trissino who, appointed imperial governor of Vicenza after Nicolò Trissino, killed his brother Enrico, “a revered and beloved man.” The populace rebelled, and in 1054, Eugenio, banished from his city, fled to Lodi, founding the Trissino da Lodi branch. Blood ties with the Vicentine Trissino remain unconfirmed by definitive documentation.

The most notable figure of this family was Oldrado da Tresseno, podestà of Milan in the 13th century. In 1513, Agostino Trissino da Lodi, married to the Cremonese Angela de’ Sordi, settled in Piacenza, founding the Emilian branch of the Trissino da Lodi, lords of Mirabello, Grintorto, and Bastardina in Val Tidone. On 16 April 1700, Francesco Farnese, Duke of Parma and Piacenza, “erected the lands of Bastardina, Mirabello, and Grintorto in Val Tidone into a countship in favour of lords Francesco and Carlo Trissino da Lodi.”

Other notable figures include Carlo Trissino da Lodi (16th–17th century), who “commanded a company of infantry in the Levant against the Turks,” and Achille Trissino da Lodi, who in the 17th century renovated the Bastardina Castle into its current form.

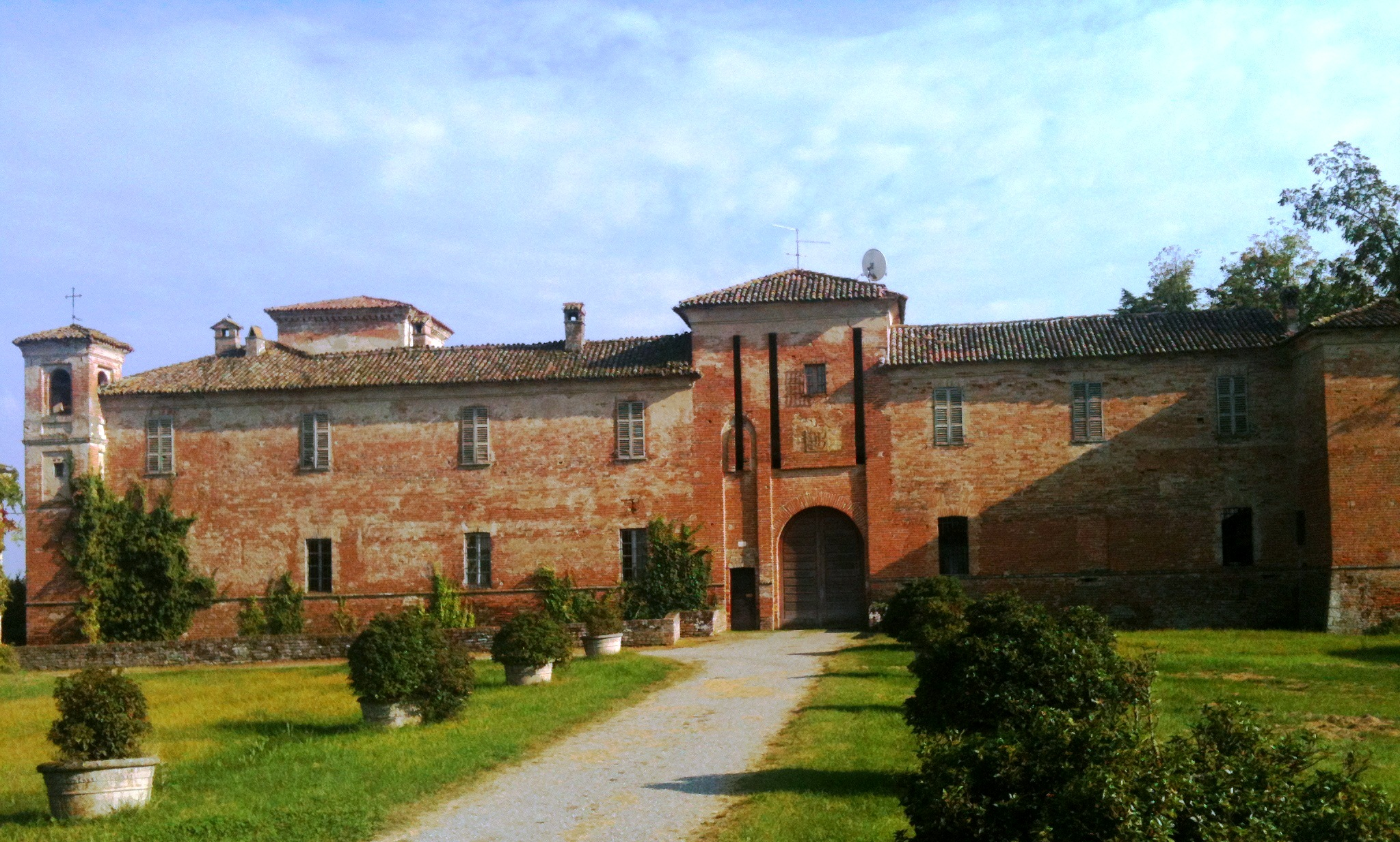
Bastardina Castle.

In the 20th century, Clelia Trissino da Lodi commissioned Luigi Ghezzi (1870–1923) in 1905 to redesign the Bastardina Castle’s garden in a landscape style. Prospero Trissino da Lodi, in the post-World War II era, served on the audit boards of several companies listed on the Milan Stock Exchange. Finally, consul and ambassador Gian Giorgio Fabri Trissino da Lodi (died 24 August 1975), Grand Officer of the Order of Merit of the Italian Republic, was the son of senator Carlo Fabri (Piacenza, 19 January 1866 – 19 February 1951) and Countess Clelia Trissino da Lodi (died 21 July 1977).

As with the Vicentine Trissino descendants, the name now survives only in combination with other surnames, such as Fabri Trissino da Lodi, Mondini Trissino da Lodi, and Cattaneo Trissino da Lodi.

== Notable figures ==
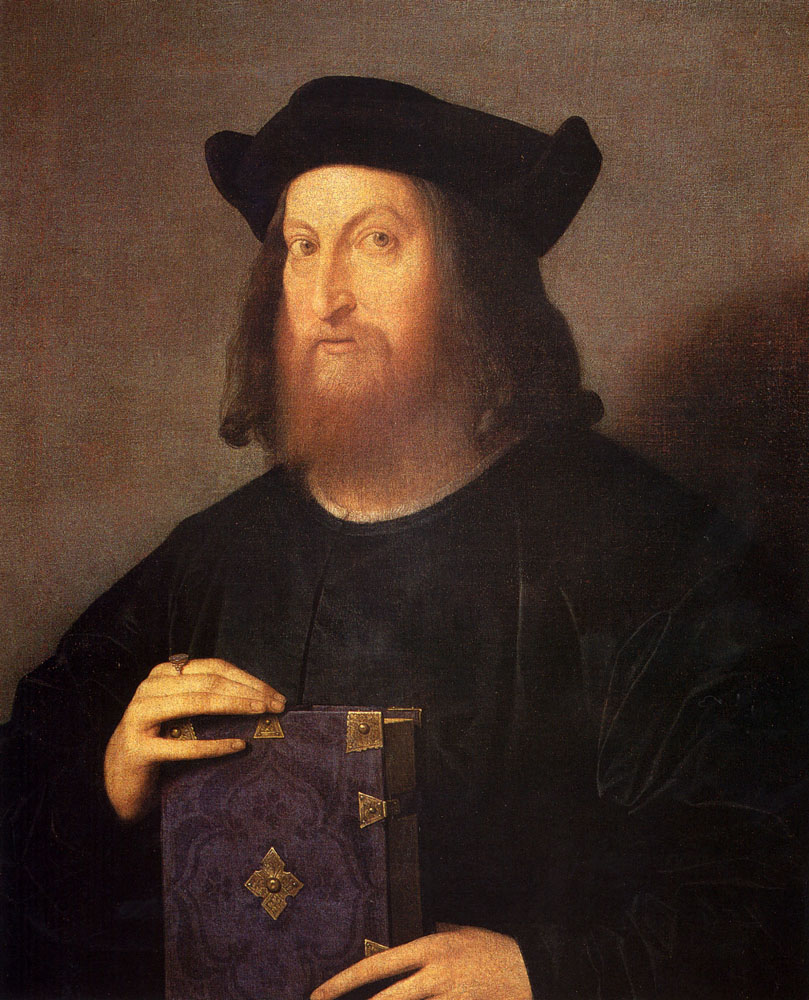
Gian Giorgio Trissino (1478–1550), portrait by Vincenzo Catena in 1510.

The most prominent and renowned member of the Trissino family is Gian Giorgio Trissino dal Vello d’Oro (Vicenza, 1478 – Rome, 1550), an humanist and diplomat, best remembered for recognizing the talent of the young stonemason Andrea della Gondola, supporting his education and study of the classics, transforming him into the celebrated architect Andrea Palladio. “Palladio” was the surname chosen by Gian Giorgio Trissino himself.

Other notable figures include:

=== Origins ===
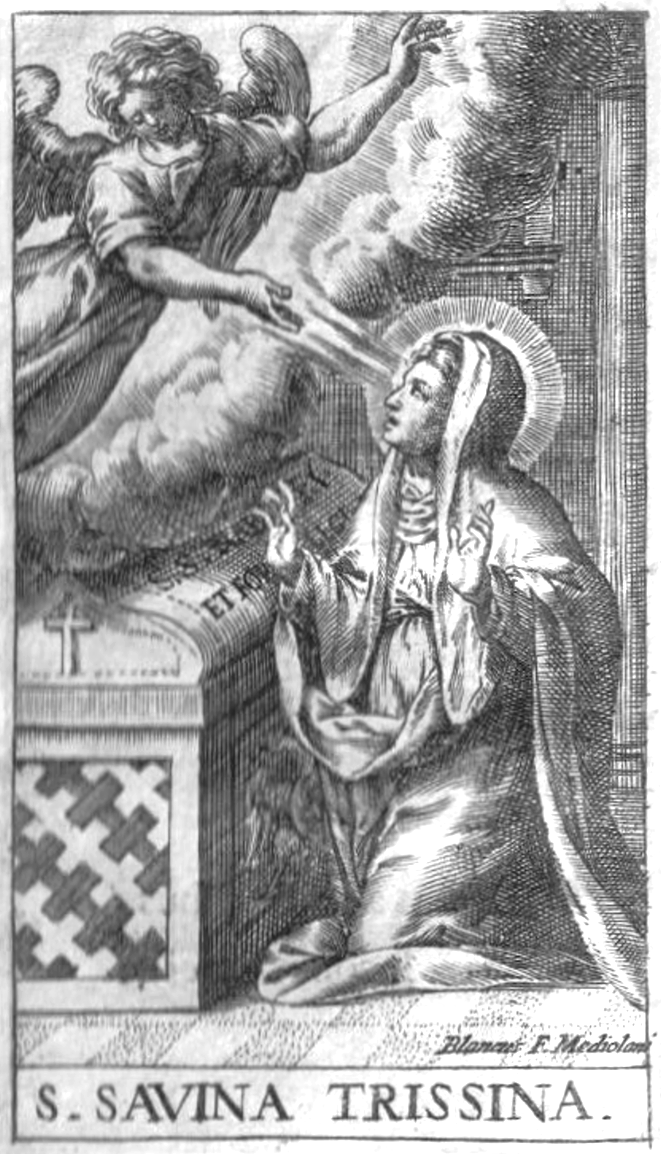
Saint Savina (c. 260–311).

- Saint Savina Trissino, a legendary figure from c. 260–311 AD, of Milanese origin, married to a Trissino but soon widowed, dedicated much of her life to charitable works. Her story, tied to the martyrdom of Nabor and Felix (Roman soldiers executed for being Christians), was recounted in 1627 by Gaspare Trissino, a Somascan priest, and in 1855 by Francesco Trissino, a writer. The Catholic Church venerates her as a saint and commemorates her on 30 January, the day of her death. Her remains are preserved in the namesake chapel at the Basilica of Sant’Ambrogio in Milan.
- Nicolò Trissino (11th century), son of Paolo, was elected Imperial Governor of Vicenza in 1013, confirmed by Emperor Henry II the Saint with the authority to mint coinage bearing the family’s coat of arms, a privilege later reaffirmed by Conrad II the Salic.
- Olderico Trissino (12th century), son of Uguccione, is considered the historically verified progenitor of the Trissino family, with all known branches tracing back to him; his name appears in feudal grants and documented historical accounts.
- Nicolò Trissino, known as the Great (14th century), son of Pace, built the church of San Clemente in Valdagno in 1380, where he was later buried. A 15th-century marble plaque commemorates him, while the tomb with an equestrian statue was destroyed to provide material for the Tree of Liberty during the Napoleonic occupation.

=== 15th and 16th centuries ===
- Bartolomeo Trissino (14th–15th century), son of Gian Giorgio and Elisabetta Thiene, was among the noblemen present at the offering of Vicenza to the Most Serene Republic of Venice on 28 April 1404.
- Nicolò Trissino (15th century), son of Cristoforo, acquired the assets (including the castle where Villa Trissino Marzotto now stands) of the Trissino della Pietra branch in 1427 upon the death of its last descendant, Giacomo, thus establishing the economic prosperity of the Riale and Baston branches descending from him.
- Leonardo Trissino (1467–1511), son of Bartolomeo, accused of murder, fled to Germany, where Maximilian I of Habsburg appointed him imperial vicar (governor). In 1509, during the wars following the League of Cambrai, he occupied Vicenza, Padua, and Treviso. He was later captured by the Venetian Republic’s army and died in prison in Venice.
- Leonardo Trissino, son of Nicolò, lived at the turn of the 15th and 16th centuries in the castle of Trissino (Villa Superiore), which he renovated in 1493 and where he restored the drinking water cistern the following year, as recorded by inscriptions on the building’s southern facade and the well itself.

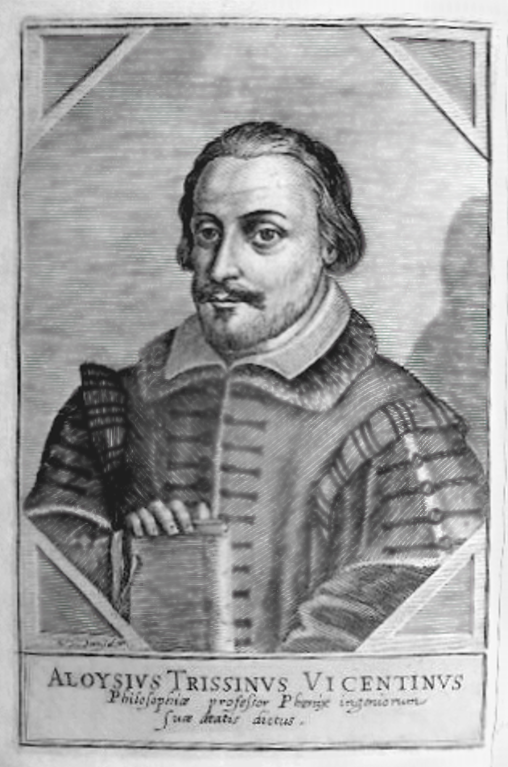
Alvise Trissino (1519–1544).

- Giulio Trissino (1504–1577), the eldest son of the poet Gian Giorgio, was directed by his father toward an ecclesiastical career and lived at the court of Pope Clement VII between 1523 and 1525, during which he developed strong opposition to his father’s classical values and the Church itself. After being appointed archpriest of the Vicenza Cathedral, he embraced Protestant Reformation ideas and aided his cousin Alessandro, a Calvinist, in escaping the city. He fiercely and protractedly fought his father and half-brother Ciro (1524–1576) over the inheritance. In 1573, he came under investigation by the Holy Inquisition and died three years later, abandoned by his family.
- Alvise Trissino (1519–1544), son of Morando, a professor and philosopher, studied in Ferrara under Giambattista Giraldi Cinzio and later held the chair of Natural Philosophy at the University of Padua. He died at 25 due to a dissolute lifestyle. Before his death, he ordered all his writings burned, so only a few posthumous editions survive, notably the Problematum Medicinalium Ex Sententia Galenii written in 1542, printed in Padua by Francesco Bolzetta in 1629, and edited by Pompeo Trissino, featuring an engraving of Alvise’s portrait based on a painting donated in the 17th century by Somascan priest Gaspare Trissino to Cardinal Federico Borromeo and placed in the Pinacoteca Ambrosiana.

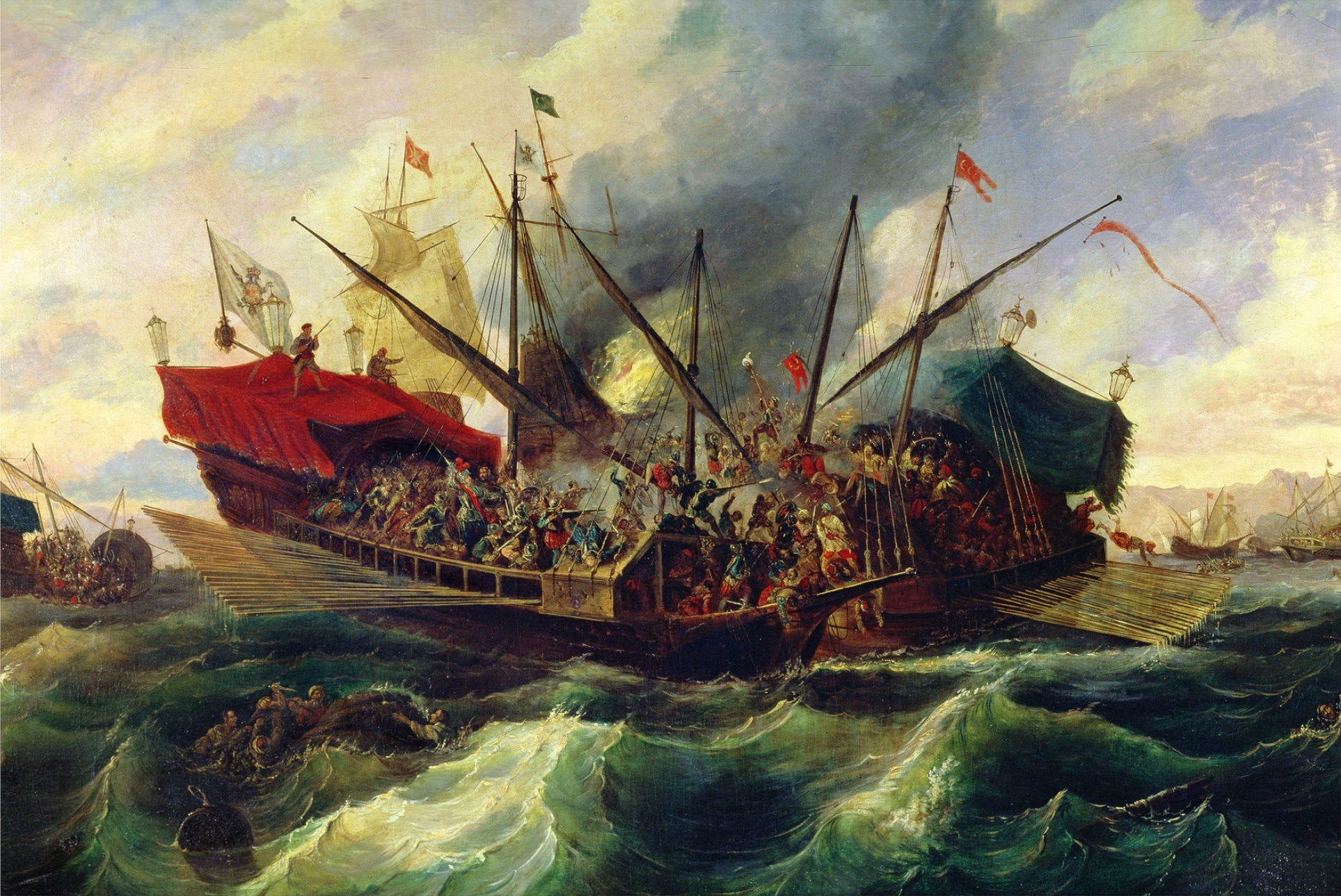
Two galleys engage in battle at Lepanto (painting by Antonio Brugada – 19th century).

- Alessandro Trissino (1523–1609), son of Giovanni, attended lectures in Vicenza by Fulvio Pellegrino Morato and Francesco Malchiavelli, known for strong anticlerical propaganda. While studying law at the University of Padua, he joined a group of Lutherans. With his friend Giovan Battista Trento, he engaged in a clandestine trade of reformed Bibles, discovered in 1563. Alessandro was arrested and tortured but, with the help of lawyer Giovanni Domenico Roncalli and his cousin Giulio, Gian Giorgio’s firstborn, escaped. In 1564, he was sentenced in contumacy, and his effigy was burned in Vicenza. He emigrated to Chiavenna, where he led the local Protestants.
- Giacomo Trissino (1541–1571), son of Conte, sopracomito (commander of a galley) of one of the two galleys sent by Vicenza, L’Uomo Marino (the other, La Torre di Vicenza, was commanded by Ludovico Porto), was the first to engage in the Battle of Lepanto (7 October 1571), where he died.
- Pompeo Trissino (1548–1620), son of Ciro and grandson of Gian Giorgio, was among the members of the Accademia Olimpica in Vicenza (founded in 1555), which commissioned the construction of the Teatro Olimpico to Andrea Palladio, completed by Vincenzo Scamozzi with its wooden scenery. He is depicted in a statue in one of the lower tabernacles to the left of the stage. In 1608, he had a plaque installed in the theater listing the names of the benefactors who decided its construction. In 1615, he placed a marble plaque in the Church of San Lorenzo in memory of his grandfather Gian Giorgio.
- Marcantonio Trissino (1564–1604), son of Ciro and younger brother of Pompeo, witnessed, at age twelve, his father’s assassination in their home in Cornedo by Giulio Cesare Trissino in 1576. After bequeathing his possessions to his elder brother, he avenged his father by stabbing Giulio Cesare as he exited Vicenza Cathedral on Good Friday 1583. Banished, he became a condottiero, and Archduke Albert of Austria appointed him counselor and superintendent of fortresses in Flanders. He died on 21 August 1604 at Ostend, fighting for the imperial side in the Eighty Years’ War.

=== 17th and 18th centuries ===
- Pier Francesco Trissino (16th–17th century), son of Antonio Niccolò, commissioned Vincenzo Scamozzi to design the Palazzo Trissino al Duomo, now a bank headquarters.
- Galeazzo Trissino (1554–1614), son of Giovan Battista, commissioned Vincenzo Scamozzi to design the Palazzo Trissino on the Corso (Palazzo Trissino Baston), now the town hall.
- Gaspare Trissino (16th–17th century), son of Ulieno and Ottavia Trento, a Somascan from 1604, was appointed provost of the Church of S. Giacomo. His mother left a bequest for the embellishment of the Trissino chapel in S. Giacomo, where she is presumed to be buried. A scholar of letters, he frequented Milan; the Biblioteca Ambrosiana preserves several of his works. He wrote a Latin booklet on the life of Saint Savina, translated Gian Giorgio Trissino’s Sophonisba into Latin, and translated the Trissinae Familiae Monumentarium into Italian. He died in Trent in 1630.
- Alessandro and Battista Trissino (17th century), Somascan priests from 1670 and 1674 respectively; Alessandro served as parish priest in the Church of S. Giacomo and died in 1704.
- Baldovino Trissino (17th–18th century), son of Parmenione and Francesca Tiziani, a Somascan from 1692 under the name Alessandro, was appointed to the General Chapter, became Vice Provost of the Church of S. Giacomo, and Rector of the S. Valentino Orphanage.
- Cristoforo Trissino Riale (2 January 1672 – 1 July 1746), son of Antonio, commissioned Francesco Muttoni to build the grand Villa Inferiore in Trissino, inaugurated in 1746 with his son Ottavio (with whom the Trissino Riale line ended).
- Marcantonio Trissino Baston (29 June 1673 – 2 June 1723), son of Leonardo, built the imposing garden entrance in Trissino in 1693 and the entrance to the Villa Superiore in 1717 (architect: Francesco Muttoni). In 1718, he also had the new main altar of the Church of Sant’Andrea in Trissino built, later moved to the left of the transept.
- Parmenione Trissino (died 1782), son of Alcasto, married Lodovica Trissino dal Vello d’Oro in 1730, served as the director of the Biblioteca Bertoliana in Vicenza from 1744 to 1779 and was the Worshipful Master of the Vicentine Masonic lodge “I Veri Amici,” as was his childhood friend Carlo Goldoni, who dedicated the comedy Il giocatore to him.

=== 19th century ===
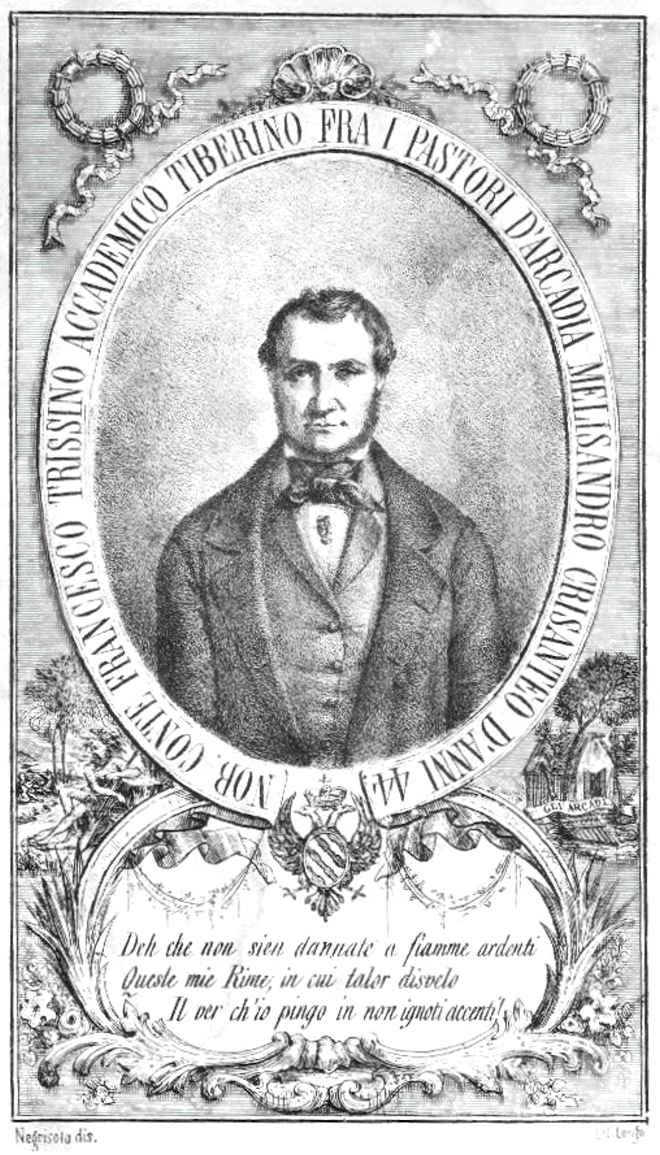
Francesco Trissino (1809–1883).

- Marcantonio Trissino Baston (2 July 1739 – 20 December 1826), son of Lodovico, married the Veronese Cecilia Emilii (1748–1807), with whom he had Lodovico (1771–1814), who married Laura Da Porto (died 1806), Girolamo (1782–1801), Alessandro (died 1851), Leonardo (died 1841), Francesca (died 13 August 1839), and Sabina, who took vows at S. Antonio in Verona in 1795 under the name Luigia Teresia. Marcantonio purchased the Villa Inferiore in Trissino from the heirs of the Trissino Riale. With the extinction of the Baston branch, the entire monumental complex of the two Trissino villas passed to the heirs of his daughter Francesca, married to Count Ignazio Da Porto, whose descendants sold it to Giannino Marzotto in 1951.
- Alessandro Trissino Baston (11 May 1775 – 20 April 1851), son of Marcantonio, completed the restoration of the Villa Inferiore in Trissino in 1843 after a fire caused by lightning in 1841. A Knight of Malta and Provincial Deputy, he was the last Trissino to reside in the Palazzo al Corso in Vicenza, which was later leased and then sold to the Municipality of Vicenza by the Da Porto family (now the town hall).
- Leonardo Trissino Baston (13 November 1780 – 12 April 1841), son of Marcantonio, owned a large library, later lost. He was a friend of Giacomo Leopardi, who dedicated the poem Canzone ad Angelo Mai to him in 1820, and of Francesco Leopoldo Cicognara.
- Francesco Trissino Paninsacco (23 March 1809 – 24 July 1883), son of Paninsacco and Eleonora Lottieri, a scholar, poet, and academic, published several books during his lifetime, including a biography of Saint Savina and acclaimed studies on Dante and the Divine Comedy.

=== 20th century ===
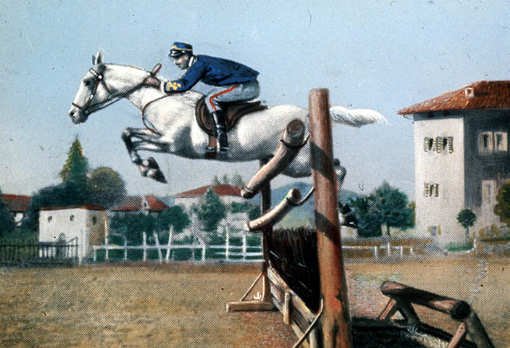
Gian Giorgio Trissino (1877–1963).

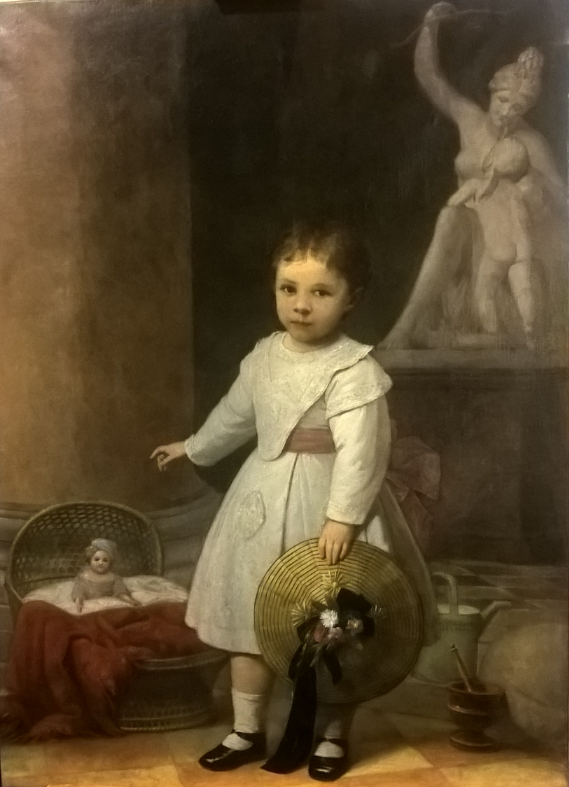
Childhood portrait of Gabriella Trissino dal Vello d’Oro (1873–1954).

- Gian Giorgio Trissino dal Vello d’Oro (Vicenza, 22 July 1877 – Milan, 22 December 1963), son of Gian Giorgio and Elena Thiene, a descendant and namesake of the poet, participated as a sub-lieutenant in the Genova Cavalleria and a pupil of Federico Caprilli in the second modern Olympic Games in Paris. On 31 May 1900, he won the silver medal in the equestrian long jump riding Oreste, and on 2 June 1900 he won gold in the high jump riding Oreste and placed fourth riding Mélopo. He was the first Italian to win an Olympic gold medal.
- Gabriella Trissino dal Vello d’Oro (Vicenza, 14 January 1873 – 15 March 1954), sister of the equestrian Gian Giorgio, donated the so-called Trissino Archive to the Biblioteca Civica Bertoliana in Vicenza in 1919, consisting of 265 bundles of documents, papers, and manuscripts from the family dating back to 1084. This archive, along with the Trissino Baston / Porto Barbaran archives donated in 1932, was reorganized and reclassified through meticulous work between 2010 and 2012.
- Ernesto Albini Trissino dal Vello d’Oro (Milan, 26 February 1904 – 20 February 1971), son of Gian Giorgio and Gemma Albini, married Luisa Marzotto (1911–1985) on 11 October 1932, with whom he had two daughters, Paola and Elena. He graduated early in chemistry from the Polytechnic University of Milan, briefly participated in the early oil activities in Libya, but returned to Milan in 1930 to work as an accountant. Appointed an official auditor by a decree of the Ministry of Grace and Justice on 10 April 1943, he served as secretary-general of the National Association of Italian Tax Consultants from 1952 to 1969.
- Paola Albini Trissino dal Vello d’Oro (Milan, 21 February 1940), eldest daughter of Ernesto and Luisa Marzotto, graduated in architecture in Lausanne in 1962 and married Franco Bottalo that same year. Her major work is the creation of the Villaggio del Bridge in San Nicola Arcella, opened in 1985, for which she designed the furnishings. She later worked on improving the environmental and landscape conditions of the Calabrian municipalities of the Riviera dei Cedri. In August 2014, she became the first woman appointed president of the Associazione Amici di San Nicola Arcella. In this role, she supported several local initiatives, including promoting the Arcomagno beach as one of the “Places of the Heart” by the FAI (later placed under environmental protection, partly due to her efforts with Italia Nostra), establishing a scholarship for studying marine pollution, and launching the “Usciamo dal guscio” project to encourage local middle and high school students to appreciate their territory’s value and beauty.
- Elena Albini Trissino dal Vello d’Oro (Milan, 9 March 1944 – Vertine, Gaiole in Chianti, 24 August 2019), younger daughter of Ernesto and Luisa Marzotto. After travels in India and North Africa, she married the musician Gabin Dabiré, with whom she promoted the spread of Eastern and African music and culture in Italy. An artist and nature lover, she transitioned from photography to painting and sculpture, exploring the interaction between nature and human beings. Her paintings incorporated diverse materials such as sand, earth, metallic or marble dust, rope, fabrics, and wood. Her most famous sculptures are made from large, seasoned chestnut trunks adorned with metal sheets, sand, and crystals; the most renowned is “The Sacred Grove.” She also used stone, such as peperino and various marbles, mirror fragments, glass, and bronze for small sculptures. She created a collection of wrought iron sound structures that produce delicate melodies when moved by the wind. Toward the end of her artistic career, she returned to photography and multimedia art with videos and audiovisual installations. Her works were exhibited mainly in Tuscany.

== Coat of arms ==
Coat of arms of the Trissino family

The Trissino family coat of arms features three double-crenelated, parallel gold bends on a green background. The coat of arms is placed on the breast of a black imperial double-headed eagle, beaked and membered in gold, armed and langued in red. Sometimes the coat of arms bears the comital crown with nine visible pearls, often absent in graphic representations, while the eagle supports the crown of the Holy Roman Empire. The Biblioteca Civica Bertoliana in Vicenza holds nine manuscript armorials, dating from the 17th century to the early 20th century. The volume by Valentino Dall’Acqua depicts the Trissino coat of arms bordered in silver, a version attributed to the cadet Trissino Paninsacco branch. In one of the tombstones in the floor of the Church of Saints Philip and James in Vicenza—now deconsecrated and annexed to the Biblioteca Bertoliana—the coat of arms is inlaid with green and yellow colored marbles, positioned at the centre of the eagle’s breast carved in black on the slab.

Coat of arms of the Trissino dal Vello d’Oro family

The coat of arms granted by Emperor Maximilian I to Gian Giorgio Trissino dal Vello d’Oro in 1515 reflects the epithet “dal Vello d’Oro” (aurei velleris insigna quae gestare possis et valeas) on its right side, featuring a natural tree with a bifurcated trunk bearing a Golden Fleece in gold on a field, which some describe as azure and others as gold. The trunk is entwined with a silver serpent, and among the foliage is a fluttering silver ribbon bearing the motto “ΠAN TO ZHTOYMENON AΛΩTON” in black Greek capital letters, taken from lines 110 and 111 of Sophocles’ Oedipus Rex, meaning “he who seeks finds.” On the left side, on a green field, are the three double-crenelated gold bends, each with only three segments. The double-headed eagle and crowns are identical to the Trissino coat of arms.

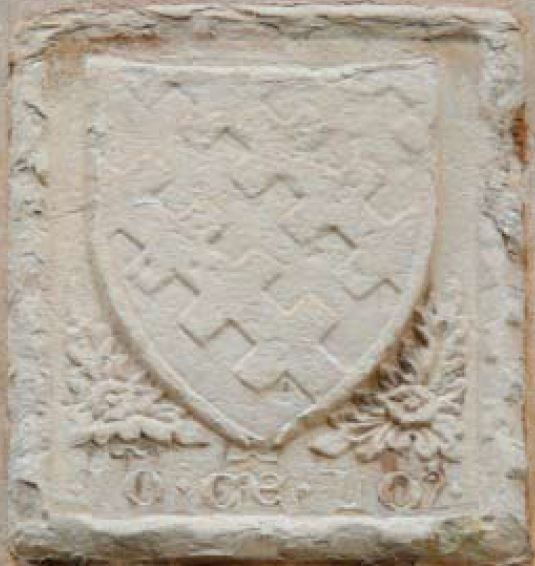
Ancient stone coat of arms located between the first-floor windows of Casa Trissino, Corso Italia 35, Valdagno (13th century).

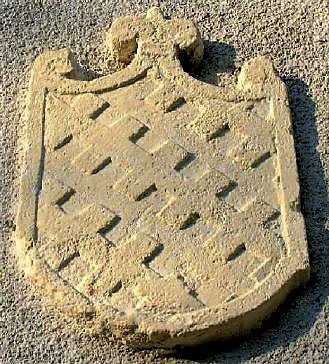
Stone coat of arms on the facade of Villa Trissino in Tezzon, between Cornedo and Castelgomberto (16th century).

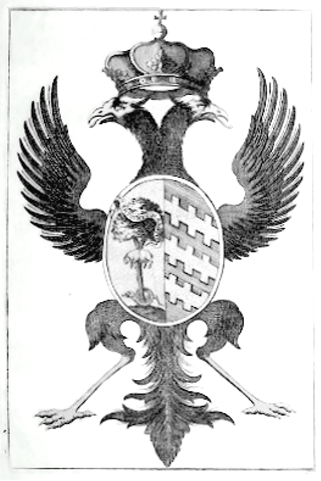
Coat of arms granted to Giangiorgio Trissino dal Vello d’Oro in 1515 (from the monograph dedicated to him by P.F. Castelli in 1753).

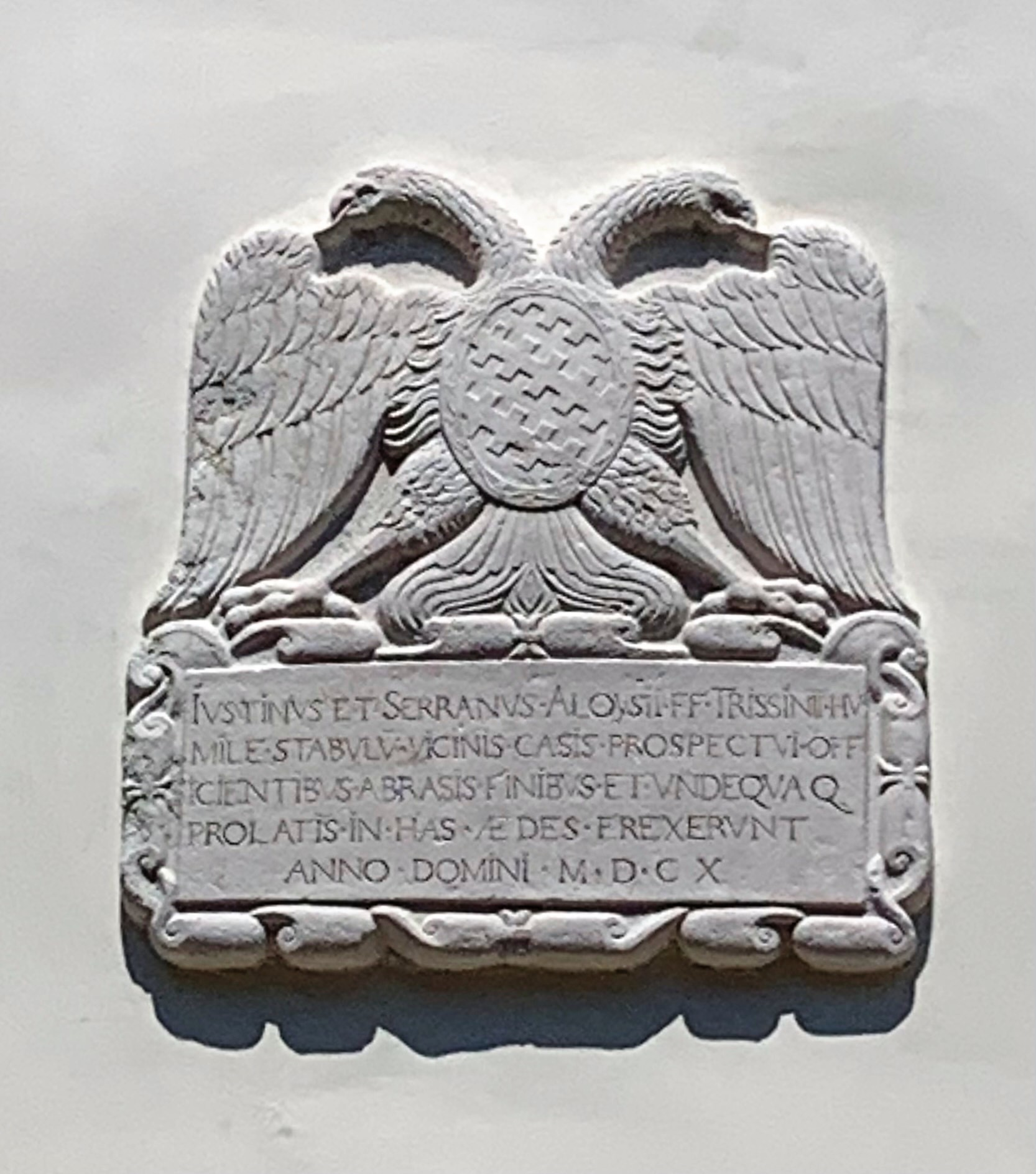
Stone plaque from 1610 bearing the Trissino family coat of arms at the entrance to Villa Trissino in Sandrigo (VI).

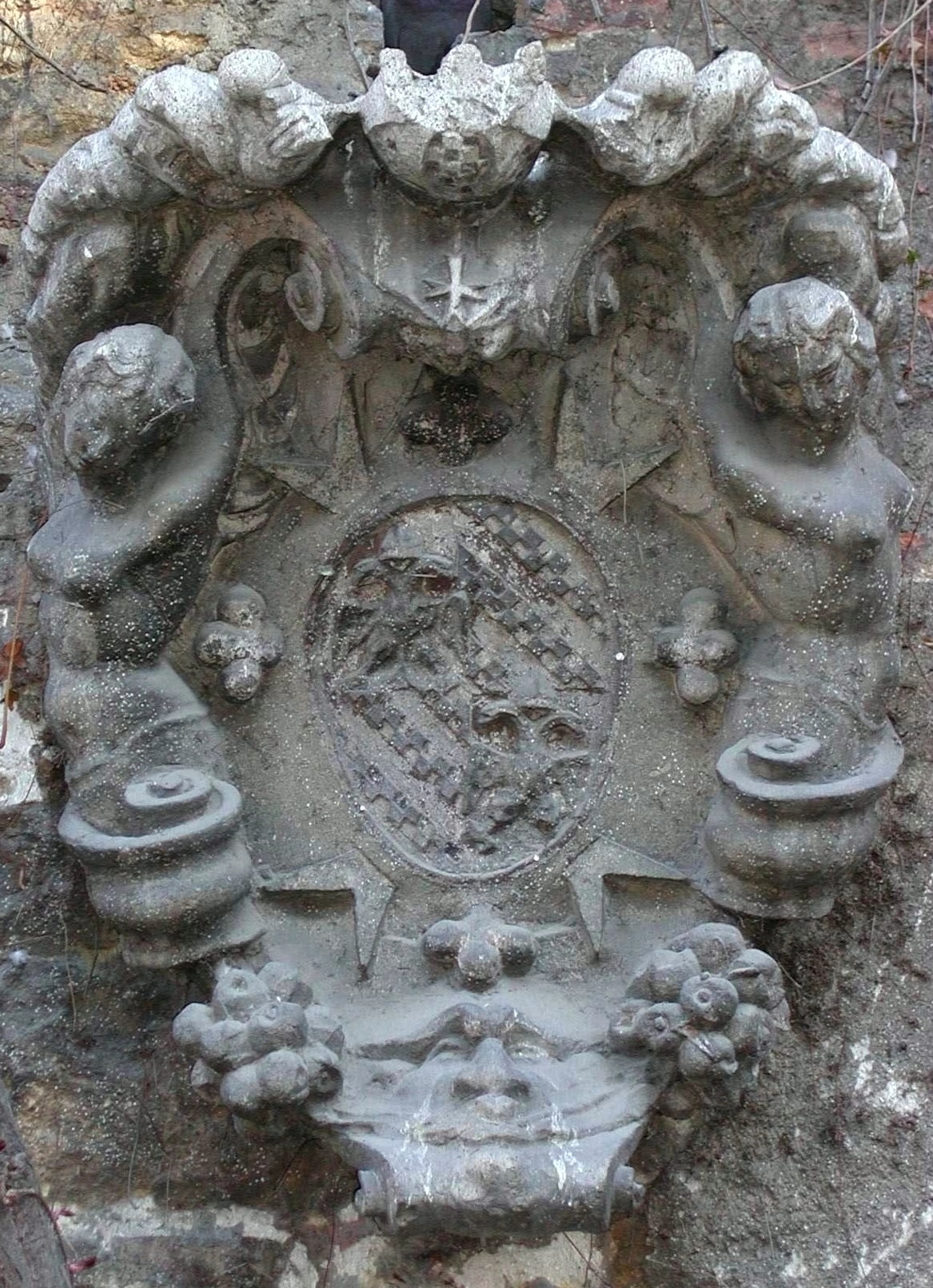
Coat of arms with Trissino insignia and the imperial eagle, located in the courtyard of the Teatro Olimpico.

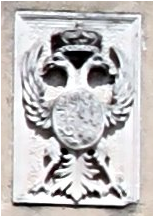
Coat of arms on the towers of Villa Trissino in Cricoli.

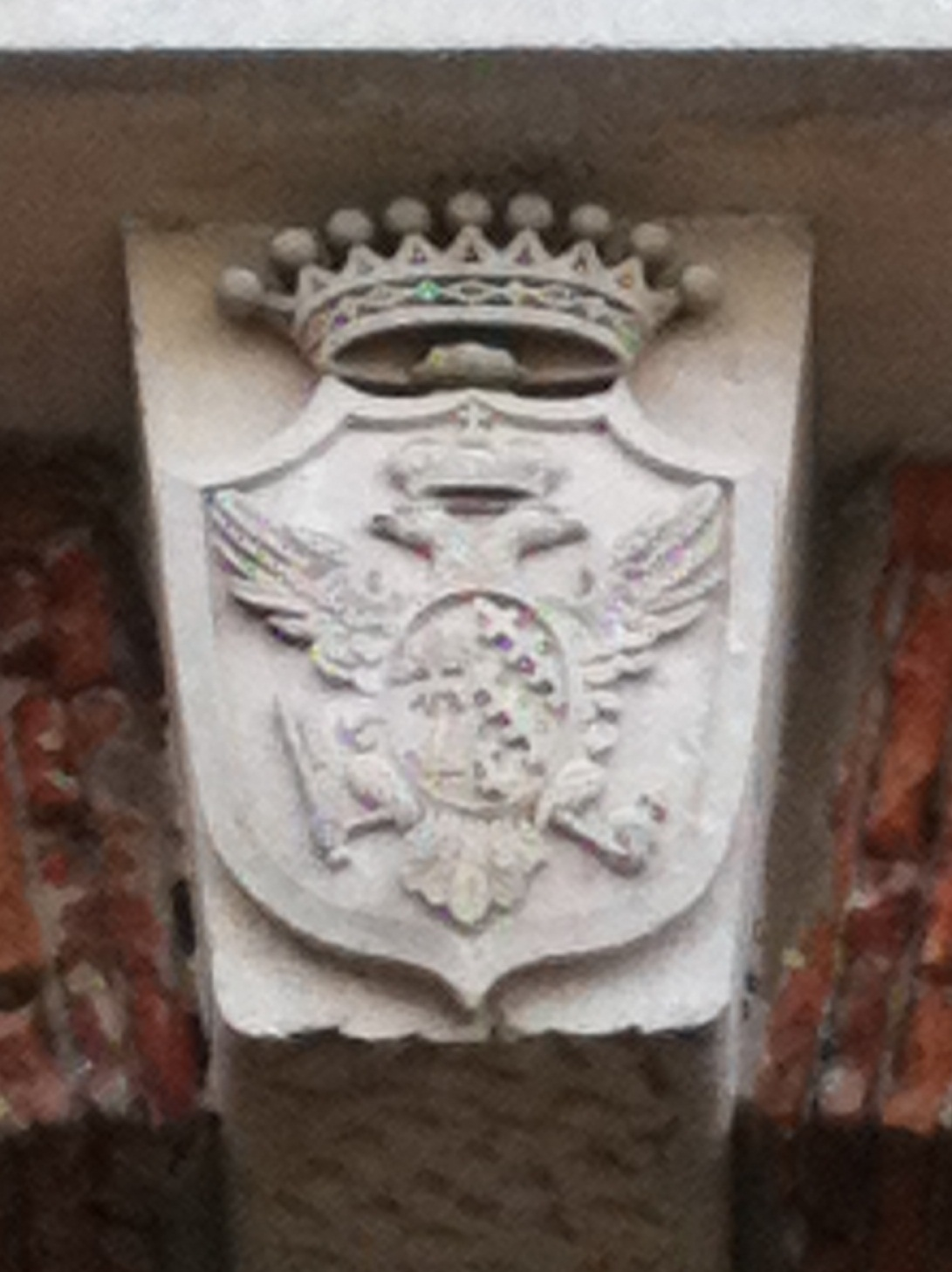
Keystone of the Trissino dal Vello d’Oro family chapel at the Main Cemetery of Vicenza.

== Architecture ==
Numerous buildings in the Vicenza area were constructed or owned by the Trissino family and bear their name, including:

=== Palaces in Vicenza ===
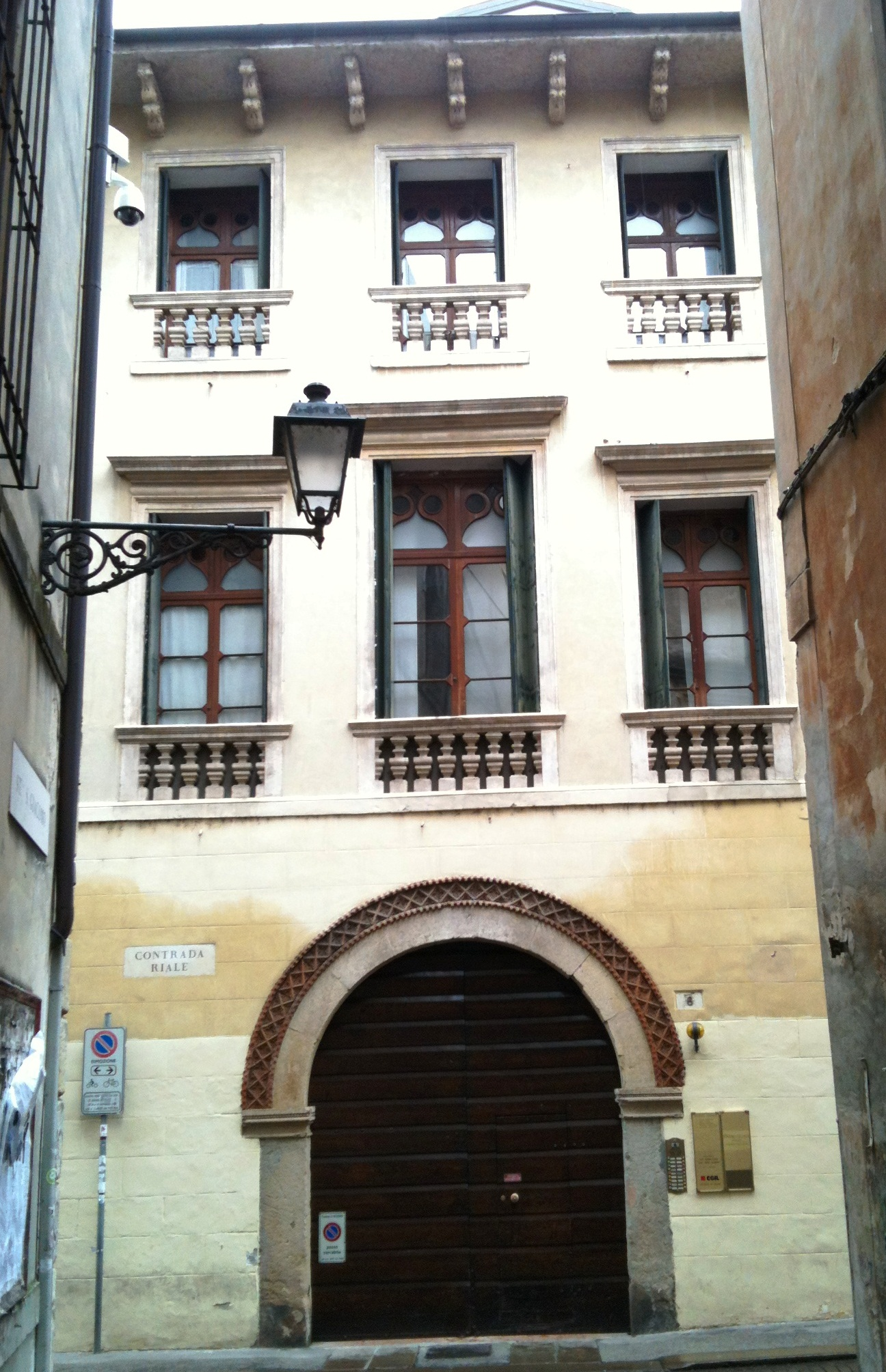
View of Palazzo Trissino Lanza in Contrà Riale, from Stradella S. Giacomo.

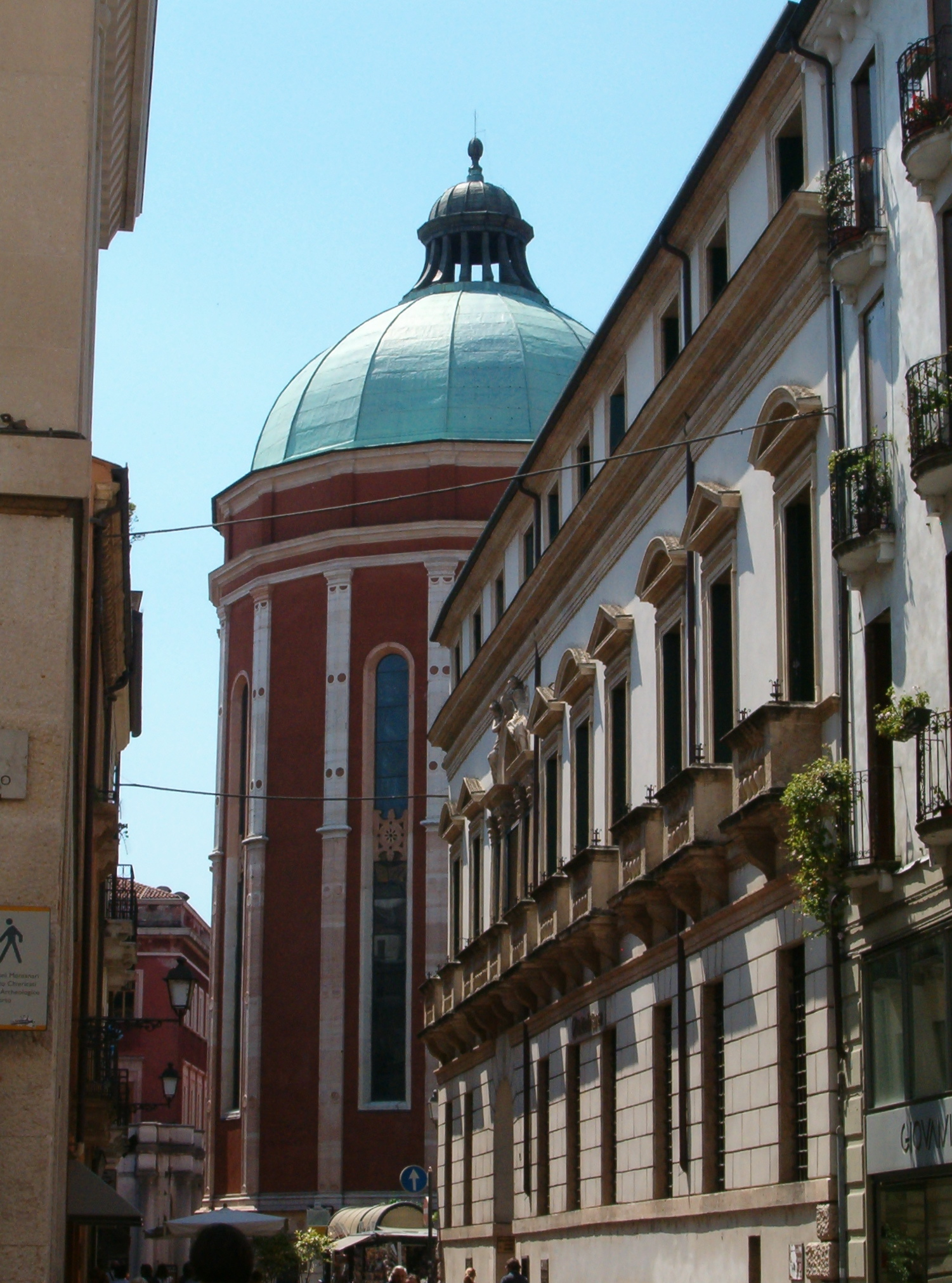
Facade of Palazzo Trissino al Duomo and, in the background, the apse of the Cathedral with Palladio’s dome.

- Palazzo Trissino Clementi or Trissino Sperotti (1450–1460), in Contrà Porti 14, whose recent restoration highlighted its late Gothic windows and elegant balconies with perforated marble balustrades. It was placed under a historical-artistic-architectural constraint by ministerial decree on 19 May 1960.
- Palazzo Civena Trissino dal Vello d’Oro (1540), built for the Civena brothers in Viale Eretenio 12, possibly the first urban work of Andrea Palladio. The property passed to the Trissino family in 1565. It was expanded by the Counts Trissino dal Vello d’Oro in 1750, designed by Domenico Cerato, and again in 1820. It was bombed in 1944, later rebuilt, and is now a nursing home. It has been under a historical-artistic-architectural constraint since 28 June 1997.
- Palazzo Trissino Conti Barbaran, begun in 1537 for Girolamo Trissino in Contrà Santo Stefano, characterized by a grand, classical portal. The interiors were refurbished in the 18th century, the following century, and more recently after damage from the 1944 bombings.
- Casa Trissino Menaldo in Corso Palladio, home to a kindergarten, placed under a historical-artistic-architectural constraint by ministerial decree on 11 January 1959.
- Palazzo Trissino al Duomo, or Trissino Trento (1577–1579), an elegant building designed by Vincenzo Scamozzi for Pier Francesco Trissino in today’s Via Cesare Battisti 10, a bank headquarters since 1906 and under a historical-artistic-architectural constraint since 25 May 1960.
- Palazzo Trissino Lanza (1580), in contrà Riale 6, originally from the 16th century and repeatedly remodeled, features a notable late medieval-style portal. It was placed under a historical-artistic-architectural constraint by ministerial decree on 14 May 1928.
- Palazzo Trissino al Corso, or Trissino Baston (since 1901 the Vicenza town hall), designed by Vincenzo Scamozzi in 1588 and built between 1592 and 1667 for Galeazzo Trissino, in Corso Palladio 98. It was placed under a historical-artistic-architectural constraint by ministerial decree on 6 July 1984.

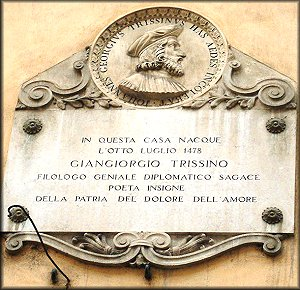
Plaque on the birth house of Gian Giorgio Trissino, at Corso Fogazzaro 15, Vicenza, created by Bartolomeo Bongiovanni.

Of historical interest is also the

- Birth house of Gian Giorgio Trissino, located at No. 15 Corso Fogazzaro.

Additionally, in Valdagno, at Corso Italia 35, there is the so-called

- Trissino House, a Renaissance-style mansion that still displays the ancient family crest in a prominent stone bas-relief between the windows of the first floor.
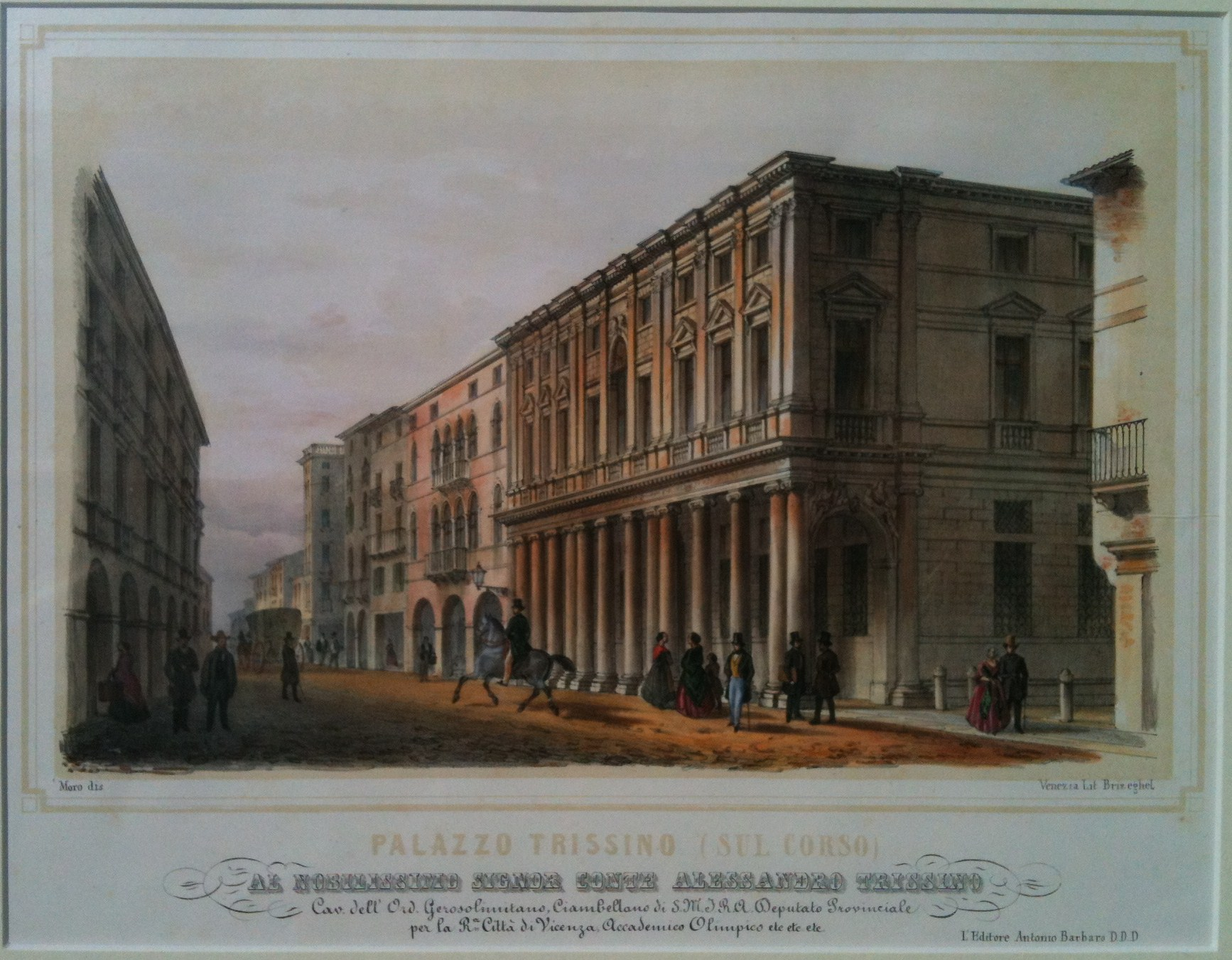
Palazzo Trissino (on the Corso), lithograph by Marco Moro (1817–1885) dedicated to Alessandro Trissino, 1847.

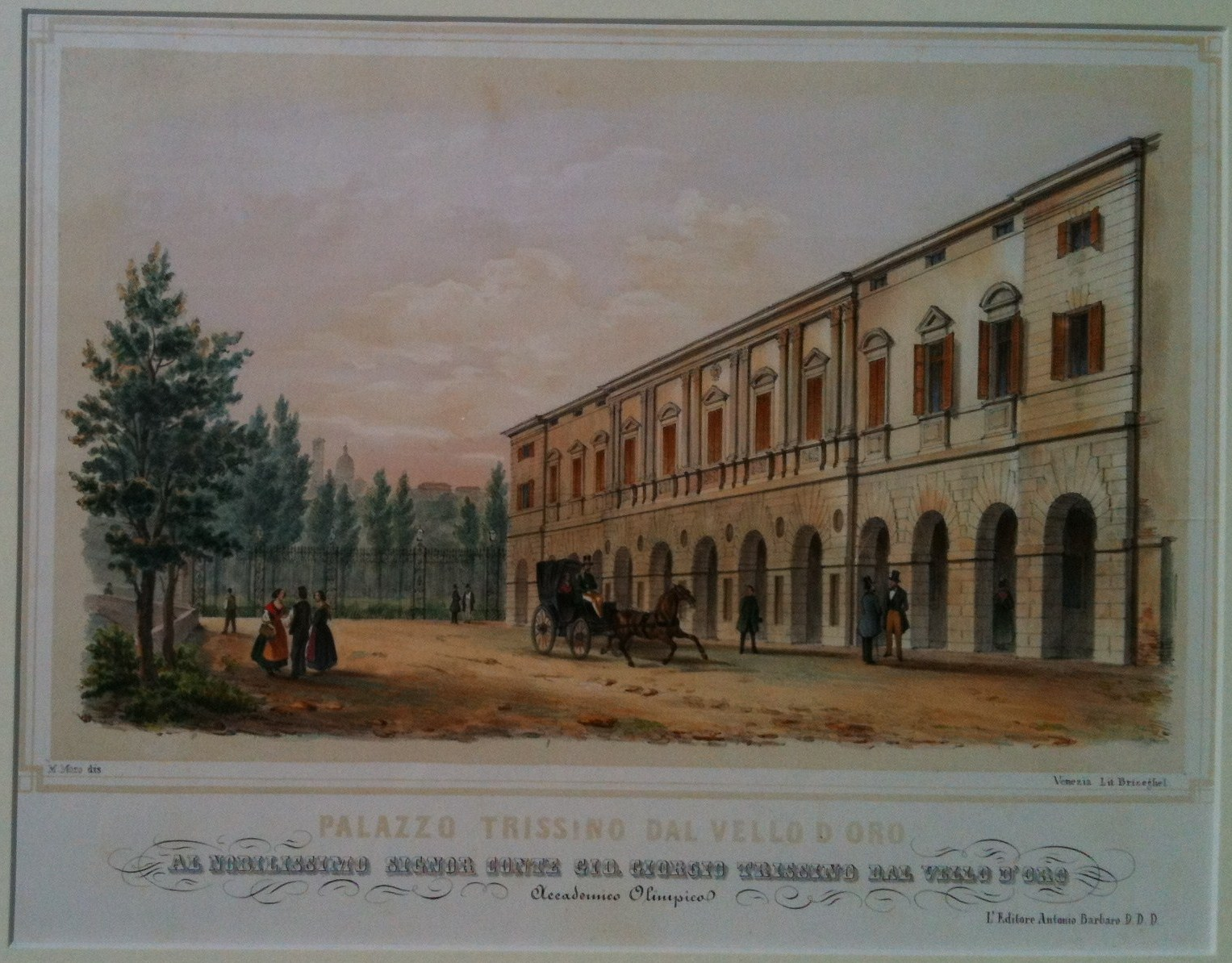
Palazzo Trissino dal Vello d'Oro (formerly Civena), lithograph by Marco Moro dedicated to Giangiorgio Trissino dal Vello d'Oro, 1847.
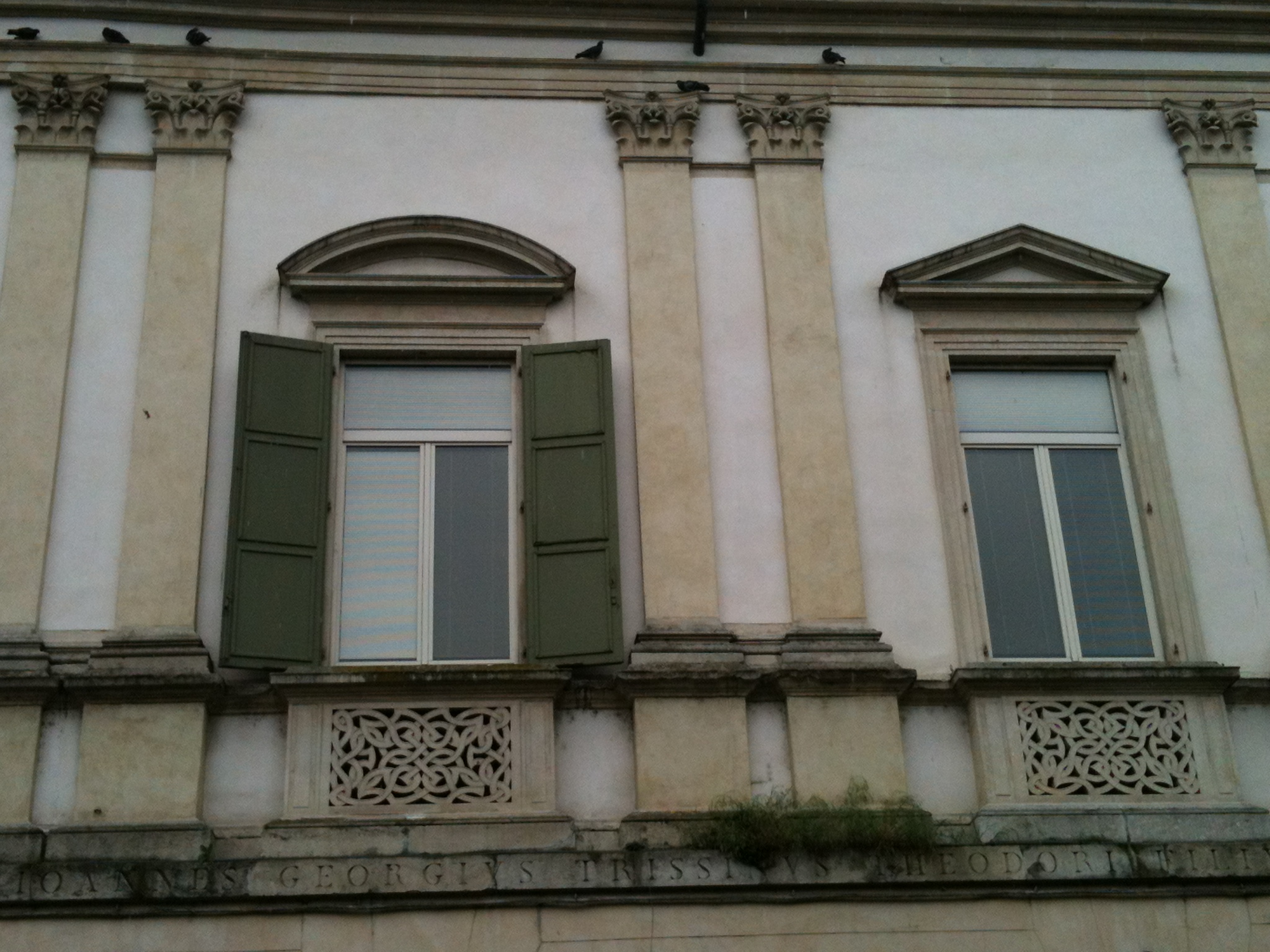
Detail of the windows on the piano nobile of Palazzo Civena Trissino.

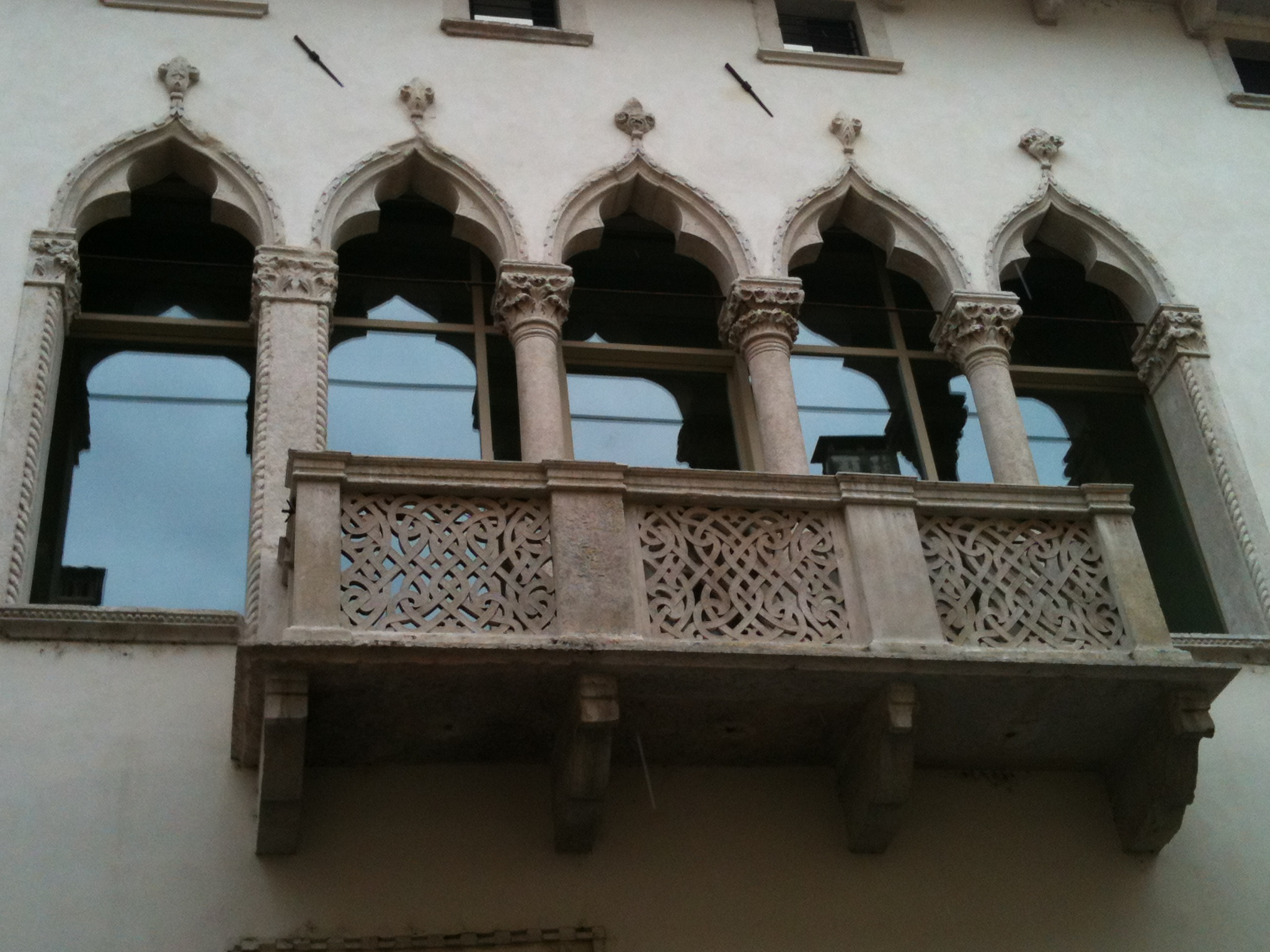
Loggia and balcony on the facade of Palazzo Trissino Sperotti.

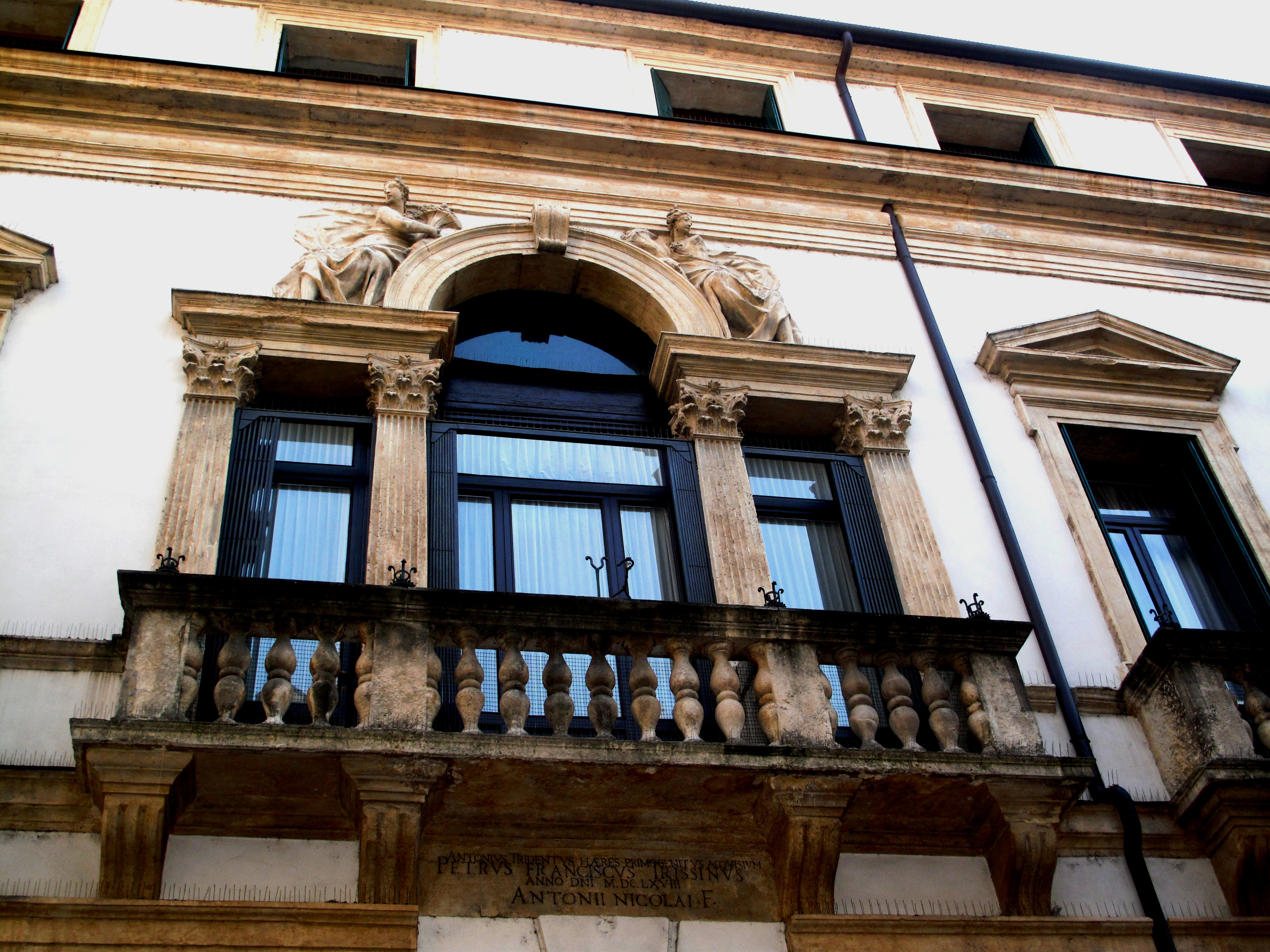
Detail of the Serlian window above the entrance of Palazzo Trissino al Duomo.

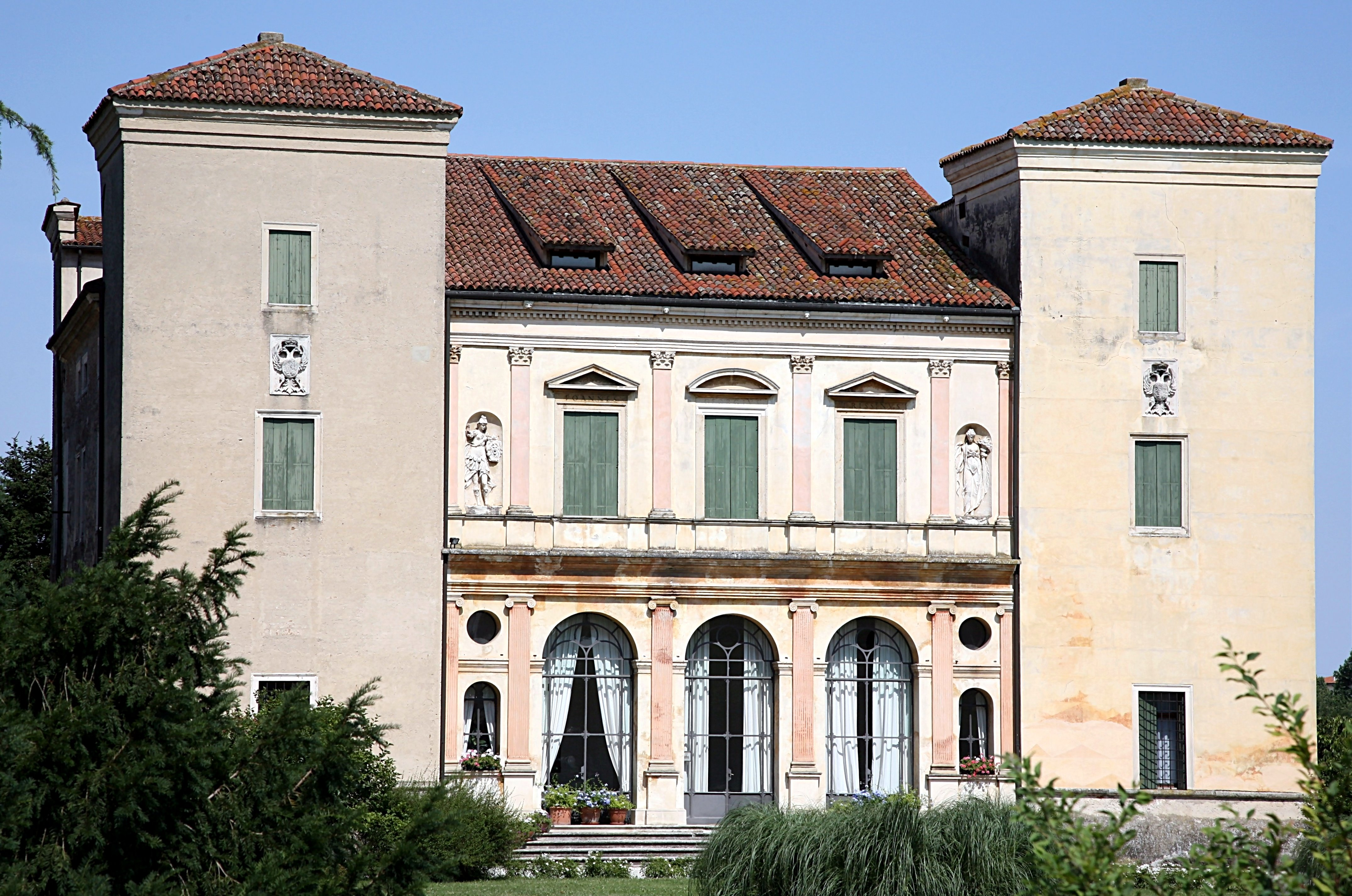
Villa Trissino (Cricoli), residence of the humanist Gian Giorgio Trissino.

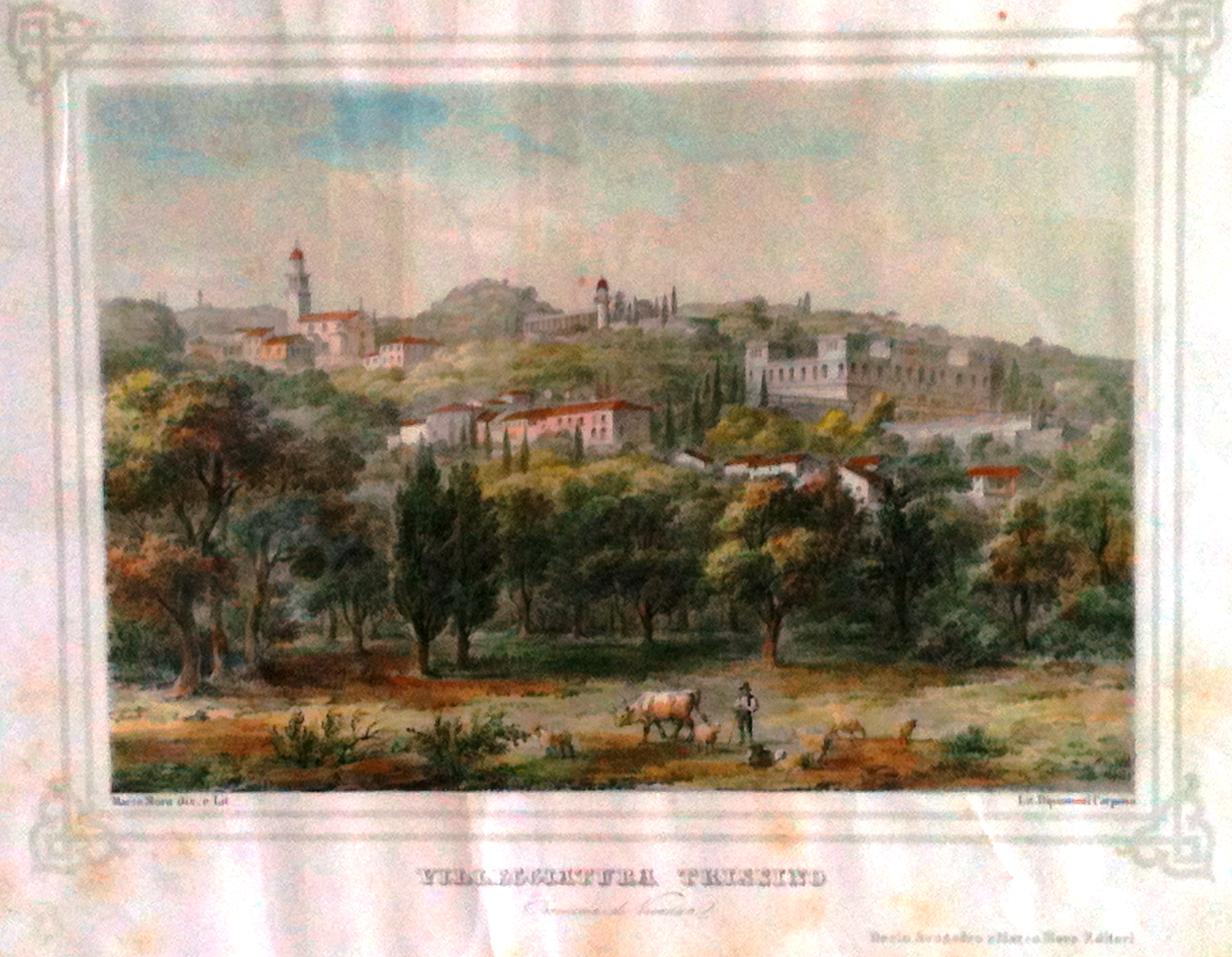
Villeggiatura Trissino, lithograph by Marco Moro, 1850. View of the hill of Trissino (Vicenza) with the lower Trissino Marzotto villa prominently featured.

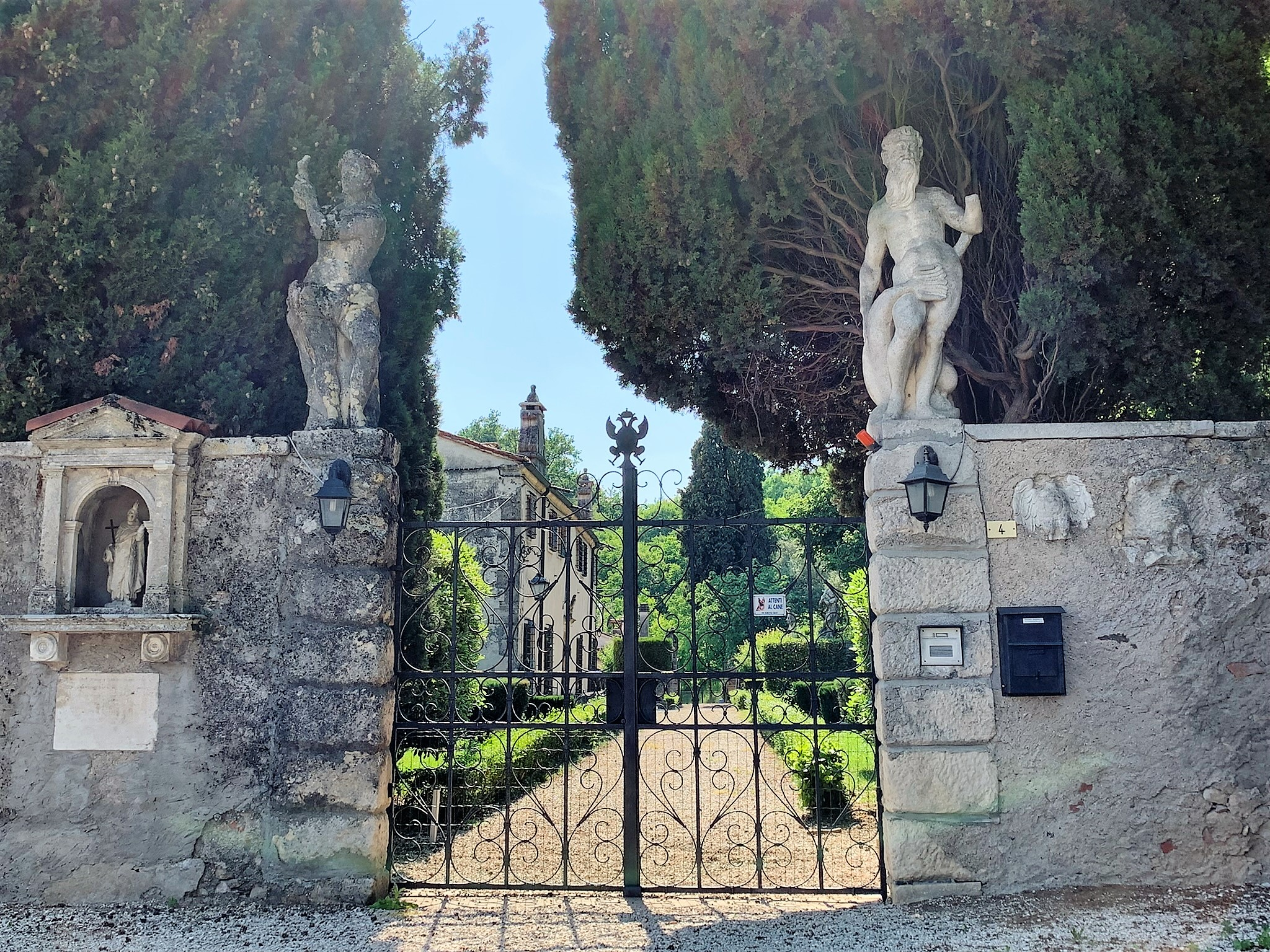
Entrance gate of Villa Trissino Paninsacco in Trissino (VI).

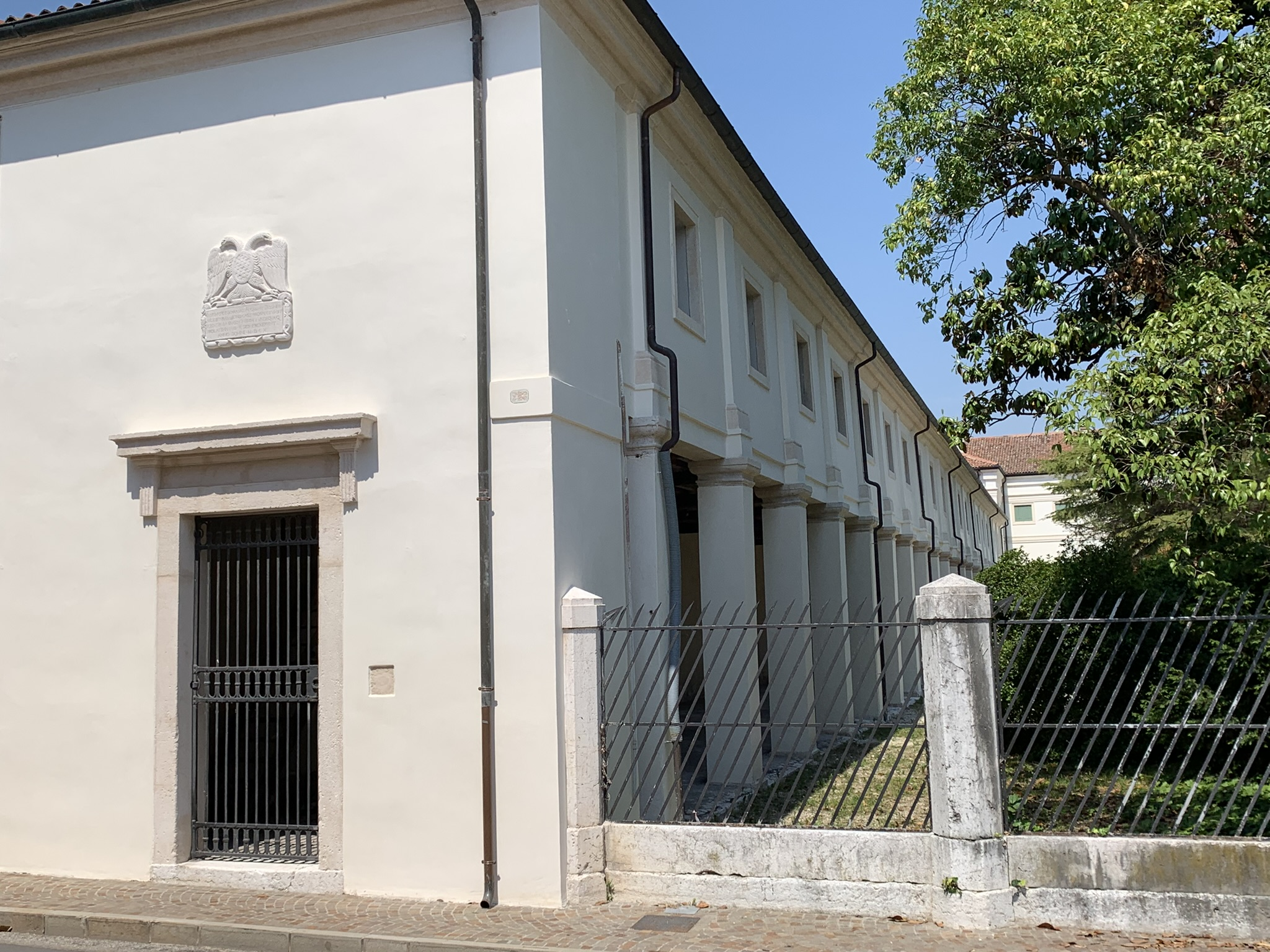
Entrance to the barchessa of Villa Trissino in Sandrigo.

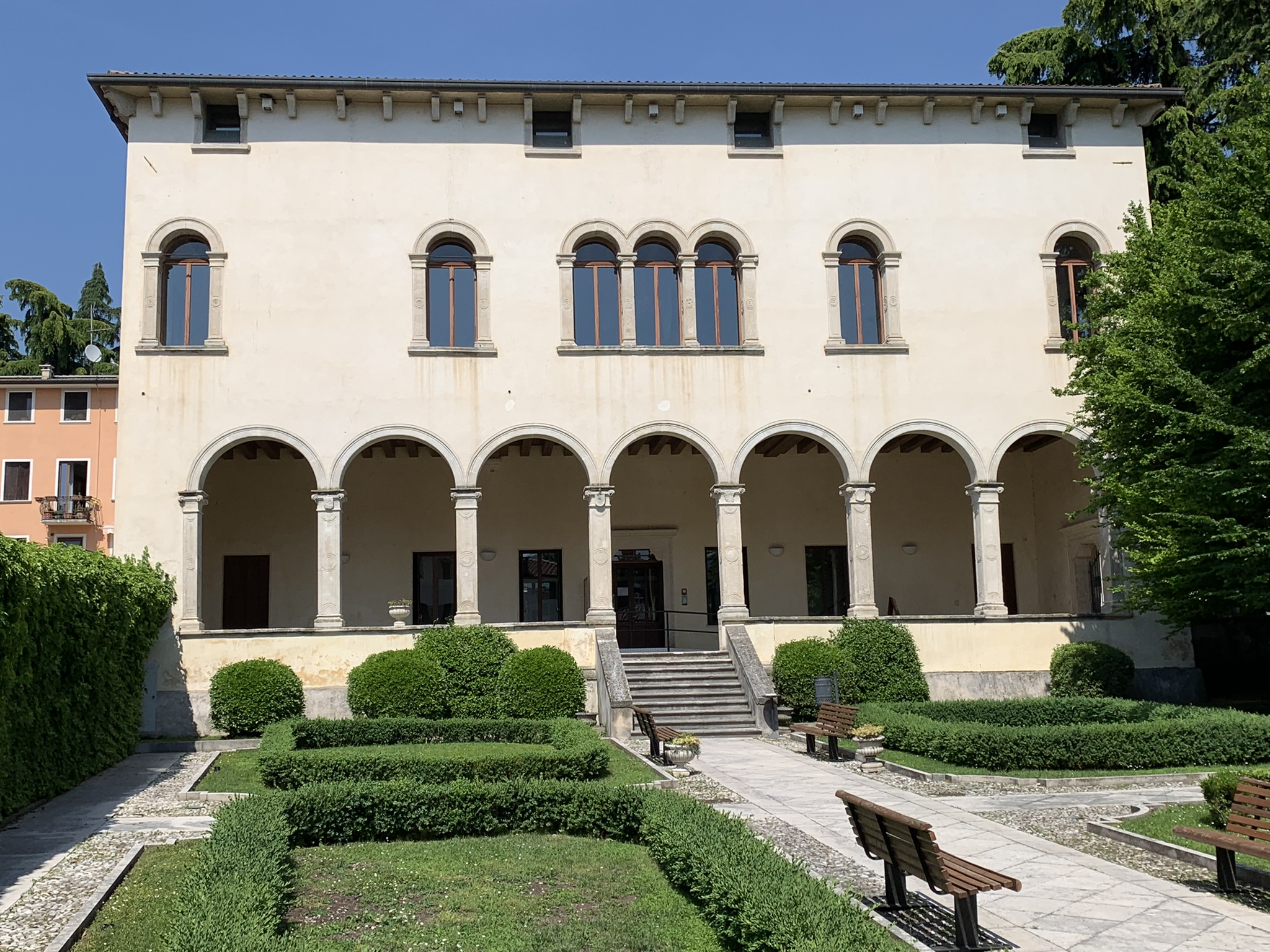
Main facade and gardens of Villa Trissino in Cornedo Vicentino.

=== Villas ===
- Villa Trissino Centomo (1480–1495), Trissino (VI), presumed to be the oldest surviving Trissino residence; a plaque on the facade from 1493 commemorates the Renaissance restoration and traces the building’s initial construction to 1100. While this date lacks documentation, the design of the Trissino crest, supported by a single-headed eagle, suggests a date prior to 1236, when the double-headed eagle was granted to the Trissino family by Emperor Frederick II. It is now privately owned.
- Villa Trissino (14th century), Cornedo Vicentino (VI), an elegant structure adorned with a loggia of seven arches on the ground floor and a trifora on the piano nobile, flanked by two pairs of monoforas. Designed by an anonymous follower of Lorenzo da Bologna, it has recently been restored to its former splendor. Now municipally owned, it houses the Civic Library and serves as a hub for Cornedo’s cultural activities. In Cornedo’s main square, there were once two Trissino villas: the one described here has been preserved, serving as the country residence of Francesco and Ludovico di Giovanni (patrons of Villa Trissino in Meledo); the other, where Ciro di Gian Giorgio Trissino dal Vello d’Oro was assassinated in 1576, remained with this branch of the family until the 19th century and was significantly altered and incorporated into new buildings after World War II.
- Villa Trissino Barbaran (15th century), Castelgomberto (VI), begun in 1435 in Gothic style and completed in the mid-15th century by Nicolò and Giacomo Trissino, sons of Conte. Surviving 15th-century elements include the loggia, later moved from the ground floor to the second floor, and some windows on the rear of the main wing. A plaque in the tympanum on the building’s side (along Via Villa) commemorates the extensive restoration undertaken by Parmenione Trissino in the early 18th century. It is now municipally owned.
- Villa Trissino Paninsacco (1490–1510), Trissino (VI), a Renaissance structure with a garden adorned with 17th-century statues, it is one of the few properties still owned by direct descendants of the Trissino family.
- Villa della Colombara Trissino (first half of the 16th century), Trissino (VI), located in the plains, this example of a rural villa is in a state of disrepair and nearly abandoned.
- Villa Trissino in Cricoli, Vicenza, a building of Gothic origins transformed in 1530 based on a design by Gian Giorgio Trissino dal Vello d’Oro. During the renovation, the renowned humanist discovered the talents of one of the stonemasons working on the villa, leading Andrea della Gondola to become Palladio. Between 1798 and 1804, Ottone Calderari carried out modernization work commissioned by Count Teodoro Trissino dal Vello d’Oro, with further interventions in 1898 upon the property’s transfer to Count Sforza della Torre. By ministerial decree of 18 July 1960, it was designated a historic-artistic-architectural monument, and since 1994, it has been included in UNESCO’s World Heritage List along with the city of Vicenza. Privately owned.
- Barchesse of Villa Trissino in Meledo di Sarego (VI), the remnant of a monumental country villa designed in the mid-16th century by Andrea Palladio for the brothers Ludovico and Francesco Trissino, which was never completed. The complex was added to UNESCO’s World Heritage List in 1996 but long remained in poor condition. Restoration was completed in 2015, and the structure now is home to a hotel and is open to visitors.
- Villa Trissino in Montecchio Precalcino (VI), built in the 17th century on an elevated hillside, this three-story villa features a fine pediment crowning the front facade. Adjacent to the main house is a barchessa. Recently restored to excellent condition, it currently serves local healthcare services alongside the nearby Villa Nievo Bonin Longare.
- Villa Trissino in Sandrigo (VI), established in the early 17th century in the town centre, it is bordered by two roads to the east and south and a long barchessa to the west. It was renovated by Ottavio Bertotti Scamozzi in the third quarter of the 18th century. The main building rises over two floors, featuring a sequence of rooms with neoclassical decorations, Venetian terrazzo floors, grotesque decorations in the northwest room, and frescoes on the ground floor. To the west is the barchessa with a portico supported by Tuscan columns and the Trissino family crest on the entrance portal, while to the south, outside the current property, stands an oratory. Privately owned.
- Villa Trissino Marzotto (18th century), Trissino (VI), a remarkable monumental complex comprising two main structures: the Upper Villa, built on the site of an ancient medieval castle, and the Lower Villa, constructed in the 18th century by Francesco Muttoni and twice damaged by fire. The complex also includes a fine Italian garden, a large octagonal fountain adorned with statues, and an impressive lemon house. Currently privately owned but open for visits, with the garden available for events.
- Villa Trissino Muttoni, Vicenza, known as Ca' Impenta (painted) for the frescoes that once decorated its facade, this building of Gothic origin (evident in its fine windows) was renovated in 1525 and again in the 18th century. During the Vicenza uprising of 1848, it served as the Austrian military headquarters, and on the night of 11 June the city’s surrender was signed there between Austrian General De Hess, representing Field Marshal Radetzky, and Colonel Albèri, plenipotentiary of General Giovanni Durando. A plaque was later installed to commemorate the event. By ministerial decree of 5 July 1969, it was designated a historic-artistic-architectural monument. Privately owned and not open to visitors.

=== Minor rural buildings ===
- Villa Trissino Bragadin Montesello in San Germano dei Berici (VI), a 15th-century rural building, currently unused, situated on a slope above the village square. Its fine Gothic windows reflect its ancient origins. The complex, including a more recent porticoed barchessa, is in poor condition.
- Villa Trissino Giustiniani in Montecchio Maggiore (VI), a 16th-century L-shaped building enclosing a large courtyard. The northern wing includes the main house with an attached dovecote tower, a porticoed annex, and other rustic buildings; the eastern wing comprises a longer row of more recent rustic annexes, some with porticos. A fine Doric portico enhances the entrance. Privately owned and not open to visitors.
- Villa Trissino Albanese - Zordan in Cornedo Vicentino (VI), consisting of several rural buildings, with the barchessa dating to the 16th century and the main house to the following century. The latter is adorned with a full-arch portico on the ground floor and a series of elliptical windows on the upper floor, typical of the late 18th century. Currently a private residence.
- Villa Trissino Dal Lago, known as del Plebiscito on the Strada della Riviera Berica in Vicenza, begun in the last quarter of the 15th century and adapted in the 17th century, it is now significantly impacted by its proximity to the highway and its overpasses. Privately owned.
- Villa Trissino Volpato in Sandrigo (VI), a 17th-century building in the town centre, characterized by a crenelated tower on the facade, a fine portico, and a more recent rustic annex. Privately owned.
- Villa Trissino Conti Cavaliere Girardini in Sandrigo (VI), built in the 18th century to a design by Ottavio Bertotti Scamozzi, it is located along the curving road through the town centre. Adjacent to the main house are two rustic buildings, and to the south extends a park adorned with statues and water features, redesigned by Antonio Caregaro Negrin in the 19th century. Privately owned.
- Villa Trissino Galvan, located near Ca' Impenta in Vicenza, a building from the second half of the 18th century, with a large barchessa and other annexes forming a T-shape. Featuring a fine garden decorated with statues, it was renovated in the 19th century and is currently a private residential structure.

=== Churches in Vicenza ===
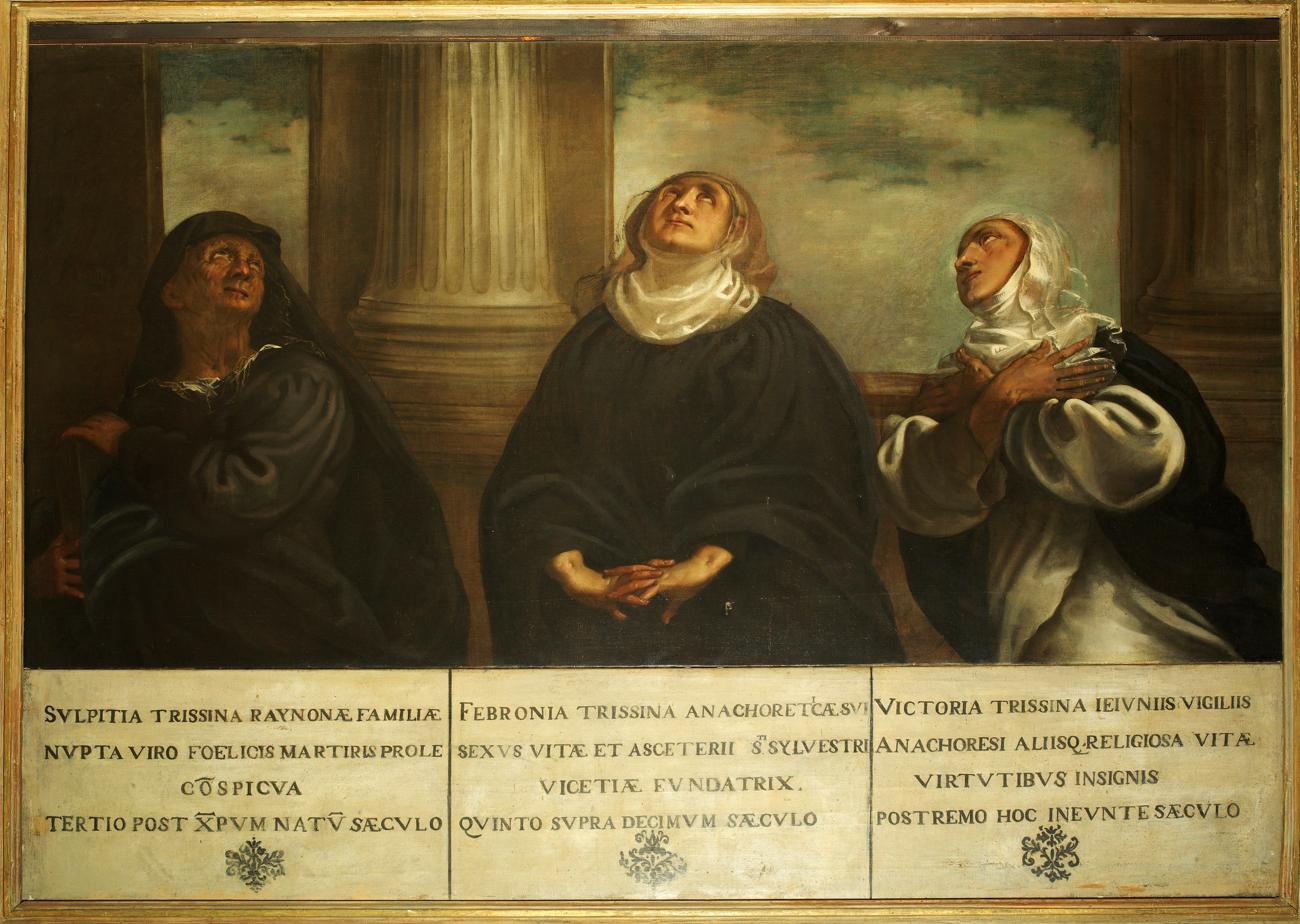
The Three Venerables: Sulpizia, Febronia, Vittoria, painting by Francesco Maffei (1605–1660) from the first half of the 17th century for the Trissino chapel in San Giacomo Minore.

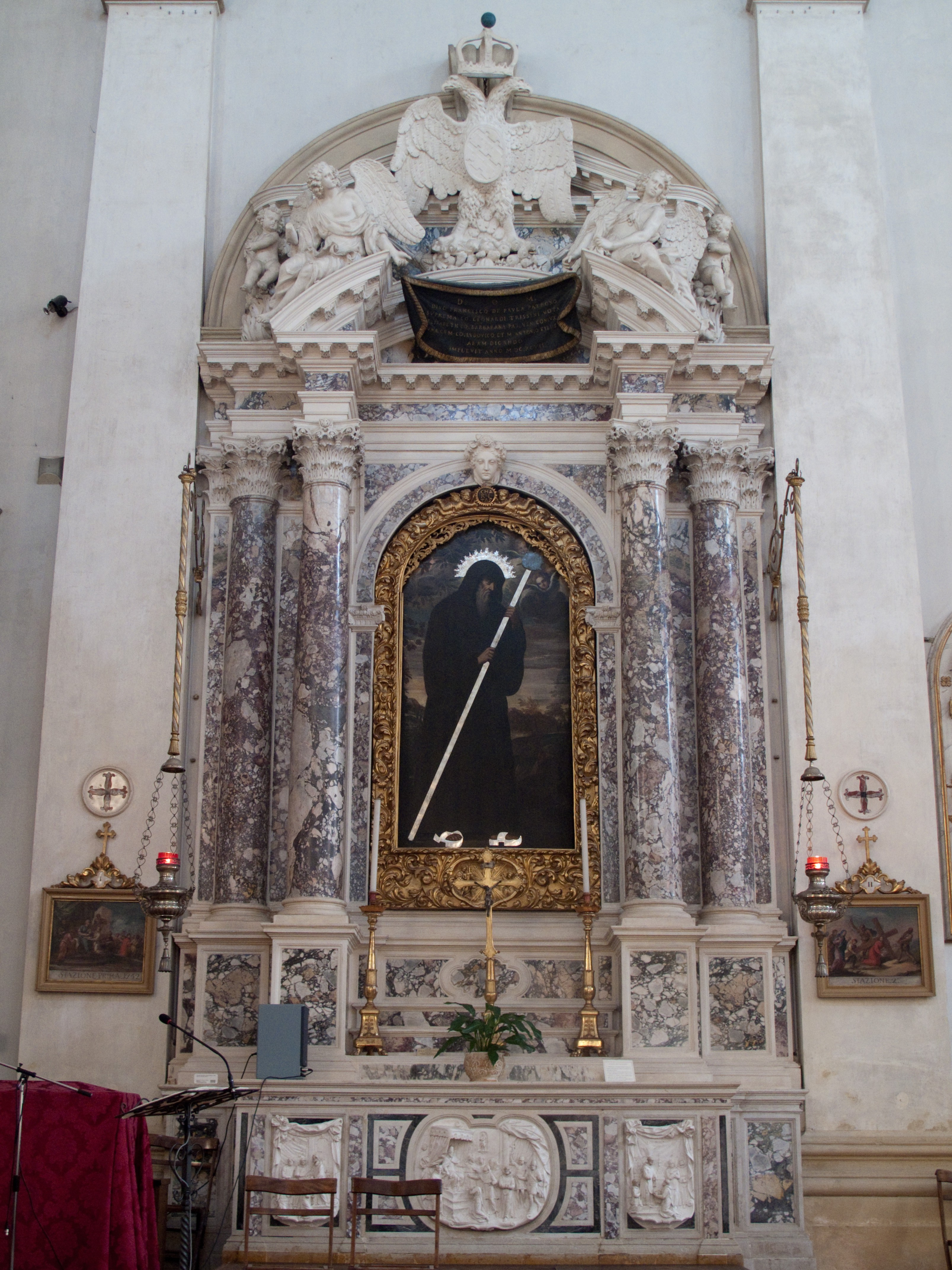
Altar of Saint Francis of Paola in the Church of San Giuliano in Vicenza.

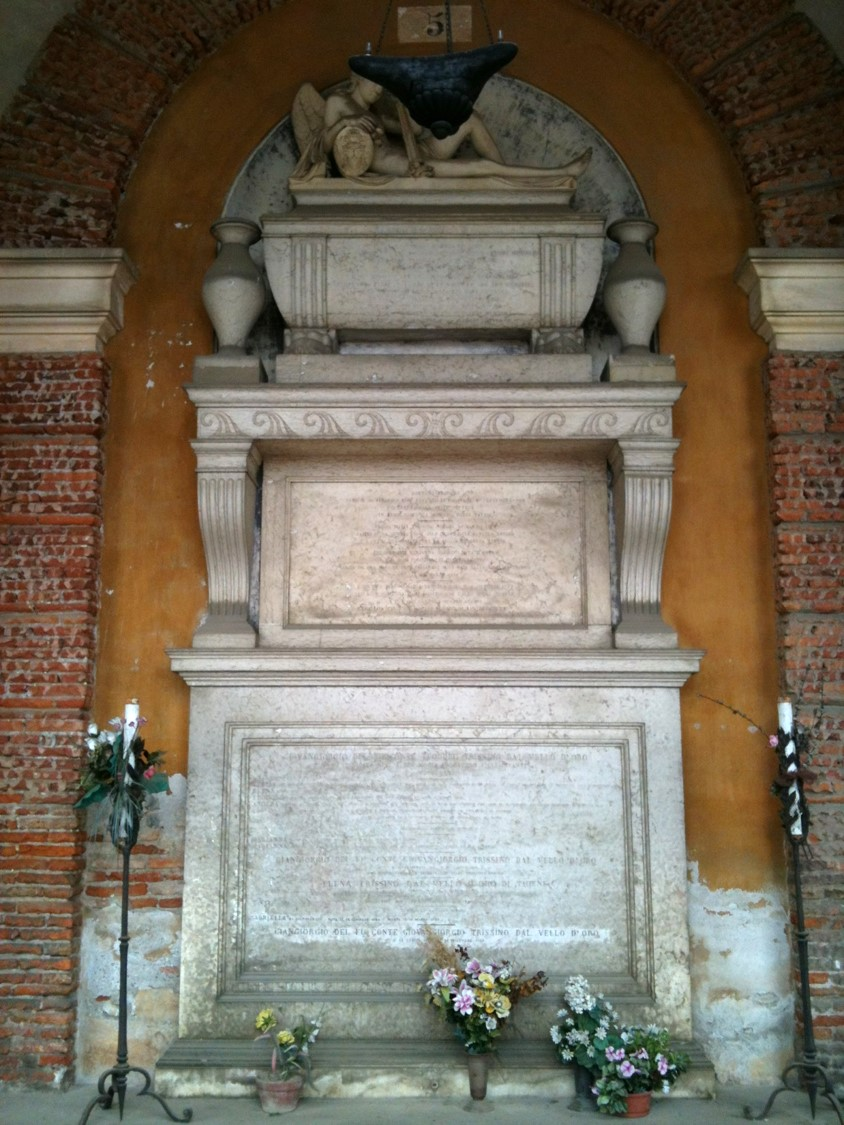
Funeral monument of the Trissino dal Vello d’Oro tomb in the Vicenza Monumental Cemetery, created by Bartolomeo Bongiovanni, topped by a neoclassical urn and the mythological figure of the Genius.

Like all families that played a significant role in Vicenza’s history, the Trissino family has left traces in several of the city’s churches.

The Trissino presence in the Cathedral, with plaques and tombs, has largely disappeared due to damage from World War II bombings. Gaspare Trissino, father of the poet Gian Giorgio, in his 1483 will, left funds for the embellishment of the sacristy and the adjacent chapel on the left side of the church. A plaque in the sixth chapel on the right, adorned with the family crest, along with another, commemorates the history of the chapel itself.

The interiors of other churches in Vicenza feature contributions linked to the Trissino family:

- The Church of Santi Filippo e Giacomo (also known as San Giacomo in Riale or Minore), located in Stradella San Giacomo, between Contrà Riale and Corso Palladio, near Palazzo Trissino Lanza and Palazzo Trissino al Corso. In 1627, the presbytery was enhanced with paintings and an architectural decoration commissioned by Parmenione and Conte Trissino. The third chapel on the right has been owned by the Trissino family since 1602, with the family crest on the keystone and two paintings: the Apparition of the Angel to Saint Savina (attributed to Marcantonio Maganza – 1624) on the left wall and The Three Venerables of the Trissino House: Sulpizia, Febronia, and Vittoria (painted by the Vicentine Francesco Maffei around 1630–1640), on the right, funded by Ottavia Trissino’s bequest for the chapel’s embellishment (1631).

The church’s floor contains tombstones for 21 burials: one, simple and square, belongs to brothers Alessandro and Francesco Trissino (1689), sons of Francesco and both condottieri; a second, for the family of Conte Trissino (1691), features the family crest in polychrome marble and is located opposite the main altar; a third, in the Trissino chapel, bears no inscription but displays the family crest on a pink marble slab, presumed to be the tomb of the aforementioned Ottavia Trissino.

- The Church of San Giuliano, located at Corso Padova 57, where the altar on the right wall, dedicated to Saint Francis of Paola, was commissioned by Elisabetta Barbaran, along with her sons Ludovico and Marcantonio, to commemorate the death of her husband and their father, Leonardo Trissino Baston. The structure is topped by a large eagle bearing the Trissino family crest and contains an altarpiece depicting the saint (c. 1650), adorned with silver leaf. The altar’s base is decorated with carved panels depicting scenes from the saint’s life. A large black cartouche at the top commemorates the family’s vow and the altar’s completion in 1697.
- The Church of Santa Maria in Foro, overlooking Piazza Biade, where the second altar on the right was built in 1587 at the behest of Francesco Trissino by Francesco Albanese, as evidenced by the inscriptions.
- The Church of San Lorenzo, located in the square of the same name, not far from Gian Giorgio Trissino’s birthplace, which in the fourth bay on the left preserves two marble plaques: the first, dedicated by Pompeo Trissino to his grandfather Gian Giorgio, and the second commemorating the altar dedicated to Saint Lawrence by the Trissino family.
- The Church of Santa Corona, which houses numerous burials of prominent Vicentines, preserves in the floor of the new Chapter Room, near the cloister entrance, the pink brocatelle marble tomb of Antonio Trissino. The slab is heavily worn, with only the Trissino crest faintly visible, but 19th-century records date it to 1402.

According to stone inscriptions collected in the late 18th century by Giovanni Tommaso Faccioli (Vicenza 1741 – Longare 31 October 1808), numerous other traces of Trissino family members were evident in various Vicenza churches, many now lost. For example:

- Giovan Giorgio di Bonifacio, a knight of the Miglioranza branch, died on 3 December 1287, and was buried in Santa Corona.
- Among 14th-century figures, Federico (died 1350), son of Miglioranza, Tommaso, Guffredo, brother of Miglioranza, and Galvano (died 3 June 1374), nephew of Miglioranza, were buried in San Lorenzo.
- Brothers Antonio and Pietro, sons of Pace (†1364), a notary in Trissino, were buried in the early 15th century, the former in Santa Corona and the latter in the Cathedral.
- Bianca Trissino, who married first Alvise Trissino and then Gian Giorgio Trissino, died on 21 September 1540, and was buried in the Church of San Francesco, near Bonifacio, son of her first husband.
- Attila di Giovan Battista, brother of Galeazzo, patron of Palazzo Trissino al Corso, was a condottiero in the service of the Habsburgs, fought in Belgium, died in 1606, and was buried in Santa Maria delle Grazie.
- Gerolamo di Giovanni of the Sandrigo branch and his wife Cecilia degli Obizzi (15th–16th centuries) were buried in San Lorenzo.
- Achille Trissino (died 14 April 1653) and his wife Maddalena Chiericati (died 9 August 1666) left a substantial legacy to the Orphanage of Mercy, including Palazzo Trissino al Duomo. They are commemorated by two busts in Santa Maria Madre della Misericordia.
- Ciro Trissino dal Vello d’Oro, son of Pompeo and Doctor of the College from 1704, was buried with his wife Elisabetta in San Marcello from 1752.

Finally, at the Vicenza Monumental Cemetery, arch No. 5 contains the remains of the Trissino dal Vello d’Oro generations born in the late 18th century up to the Olympic champion Gian Giorgio Trissino (†1963), the last of this branch born in Vicenza. The funeral monument, created by Bartolomeo Bongiovanni, is topped by a neoclassical urn with the mythological figure of the Genius.

== See also ==
- Trissino (municipality)
- Valdagno
- Vicenza
- Gian Giorgio Trissino, 16th-century humanist, scholar, and diplomat
- Gian Giorgio Trissino (equestrian), Olympic equestrian champion, the first Italian to win an Olympic gold medal
- Oldrado da Tresseno, 13th-century podestà of Milan
- Saint Savina, 3rd–4th-century martyr

== Bibliography ==
- AA. VV. (2011). Le ville Trissino a Cornedo Vicentino [The Trissino villas in Cornedo Vicentino].
- Bairati, Piero (1986). Sul filo di lana. Cinque generazioni di imprenditori: i Marzotto [On the thread of wool. Five generations of entrepreneurs: the Marzotto].
- Barbieri, Franco (1989). Scamozzi a Vicenza – Palazzo Trissino al Duomo [Scamozzi in Vicenza – Trissino Palace at the Duomo].
- Barbieri, Franco; Saccardo, Mario (1996). Scamozzi a Vicenza – Palazzo Trissino Baston [Scamozzi in Vicenza – Trissino Baston Palace].
- Barbieri, Franco; Cevese, Renato (2004). Vicenza, ritratto di una città [Vicenza, portrait of a city].
- Barbieri, Franco; Cevese, Renato; Magagnato, Licisco (1956). Guida di Vicenza [Guide to Vicenza].
- Battilana, Natale (1825). Genealogie delle Famiglie Nobili di Genova [Genealogies of the Noble Families of Genoa]. Vol. I.
- Beni, Paolo (1624). Trattato dell'origine et fatti illustri della famiglia Trissina [Treatise on the origin and illustrious deeds of the Trissino family].
- Binotto, Margaret (1981). La chiesa e il convento dei santi Filippo e Giacomo a Vicenza [The church and convent of Saints Philip and James in Vicenza].
- Canova, Antonio; Mantese, Giovanni (1979). I castelli medioevali del vicentino [The medieval castles of the Vicenza area].
- Cantù, Cesare (1859). Grande Illustrazione del Lombardo Veneto [Great Illustration of Lombardy-Venetia]. Vol. 4.
- Castelli, Pierfilippo (1753). La vita di Giovangiorgio Trissino [The life of Giovangiorgio Trissino].
- Castellini, Silvestro (1822). Storia della città di Vicenza ... sino all'anno 1630 [History of the city of Vicenza ... up to the year 1630].
- Cisotto, Gianni A., ed. (2001). Storia della Valle dell'Agno. L'ambiente, gli uomini, l'economia [History of the Agno Valley. The environment, the people, the economy].
- Crivellaro, Franco; Marangoni, Adriano; Schiavo, Giuseppe; Urbani, Laura (2015). Le lastre tombali della chiesa dei SS. Filippo e Giacomo in Vicenza [The tombstones of the church of Saints Philip and James in Vicenza].
- Crivellaro, Franco; Schiavo, Giuseppe; Urbani, Laura (2016). Arche, sepolcri e lastre tombali della chiesa di Santa Corona in Vicenza [Arks, sepulchers, and tombstones of the Santa Corona church in Vicenza].
- di Crollalanza, Giovan Battista (1890). Dizionario storico-blasonico delle famiglie nobili e notabili italiane estinte e fiorenti [Historical-heraldic dictionary of extinct and flourishing Italian noble and notable families].
- Dalla Pozza Peruffo, Giovanna (2020). I Trissino del Vello d'oro [The Trissino of the Golden Fleece].
- Faccioli, Giovanni Tommaso (1776). Musæum Lapidarium Vicentinum [Museum Lapidarium Vicentinum].
- Faggion, Lucien (1998). Les seigneurs du droit dans la république de Venise. Collège des Juges et société à Vicence à l'époque moderne (1530-1730) [The lords of law in the Republic of Venice. College of Judges and society in Vicenza in the modern era (1530-1730)].
- Faggion, Lucien (2006). Les femmes, la famille et le devoir de mémoire: les Trissino aux XVIe et XVIIe siècles [Women, family, and the duty of memory: the Trissino in the 16th and 17th centuries].
- Fornasa, Silvano (2012). AA. VV. (ed.). "Trissino, famiglia" [Trissino, family]. Dizionario Biografico della Valle dell'Agno [Biographical Dictionary of the Agno Valley].
- Fornasa, Silvano (2009–2010). "Territorio, economia e società nella Valle dell'Agno del secolo XIII" [Territory, economy, and society in the Agno Valley in the 13th century]. Quaderni del Gruppo Storico Valle dell'Agno (37).
- Fornasa, Silvano (2006). "I Trissino nel '400, tra la valle e la città" [The Trissino in the 15th century, between the valley and the city]. Quaderni del Gruppo Storico Valle dell'Agno (31).
- Gervasoni, Niccolò (1839). Giurisprudenza dell'eccellentissimo Regio Senato di Genova [Jurisprudence of the Most Excellent Royal Senate of Genoa].
- Giordani, Pietro (1834). Iscrizioni [Inscriptions].
- Maccà, Gaetano (1802). Della Zecca Vicentina [On the Vicenza Mint].
- Maccà, Gaetano (1815). Storia del Territorio Vicentino [History of the Vicenza Territory].
- Magrini, Antonio (1845). Memorie intorno alla vita e alle opere di Andrea Palladio [Memoirs on the life and works of Andrea Palladio].
- Magrini, Antonio (1869). Reminiscenze Vicentine della Casa di Savoja [Vicentine reminiscences of the House of Savoy].
- Mantelli, Cristoforo (1839). Giurisprudenza del Codice Civile e altre leggi dei Regj Stati [Jurisprudence of the Civil Code and other laws of the Royal States]. Vol. I.
- Morsolin, Bernardo (1878). Gian Giorgio Trissino o monografia di un letterato del secolo XVI [Gian Giorgio Trissino or monograph of a 16th-century scholar].
- Morsolin, Bernardo (1881). Trissino ricordi storici [Trissino historical memories].
- Nicolini, Giambattista (1864). Vita di Gian Giorgio Trissino [Life of Gian Giorgio Trissino].
- Olivieri, Achille (1967). "Alessandro Trissino e il movimento calvinista vicentino del Cinquecento" [Alessandro Trissino and the Calvinist movement in Vicenza in the 16th century]. Rivista di storia della Chiesa in Italia. XXI.
- Ortalli, Gherardo; Knapton, Michael, eds. (1988). Istituzioni, società e potere nella marca trevigiana e veronese (secoli XIII e XIV) [Institutions, society, and power in the Treviso and Verona March (13th and 14th centuries)].
- Pagliarino, Giambattista (1663). Croniche di Vicenza [Chronicles of Vicenza].
- Poggiali, Cristoforo (1790). Memorie storiche della città di Piacenza [Historical memoirs of the city of Piacenza]. Vol. VIII.
- Povolo, Claudio; Gazzola, Mattea, eds. (2012). Immagini di distinzione. Gli archivi della famiglia Trissino [Images of distinction. The Trissino family archives].
- Povolo, Claudio (2014). Fornasin, A.; Povolo, Claudio (eds.). "La Giusta vendetta. Il furore di un giovane gentiluomo del Cinquecento" [The just vengeance. The fury of a young gentleman of the 16th century]. Per Furio. Saggi in Onore di Furio Bianco [For Furio. Essays in honor of Furio Bianco].
- Povolo, Claudio (2015). Furore. Elaborazione di un'emozione nella seconda metà del Cinquecento [Fury. Elaboration of an emotion in the second half of the 16th century].
- Rietstap, Johannes Baptist (1884–1887). Armorial Général [General Armorial]. Vol. 2.
- Rigon, Fernando, ed. (2006). Vicenza e l'Araldica [Vicenza and Heraldry]. "Celebratory edition for the 125th anniversary of Tipografia Rumor, accompanied by a facsimile of the manuscript Armi delle nobili famiglie vicentine by Valentino Dall'Acqua, 1759, preserved at the Biblioteca Bertoliana"
- Romani, Giovanni Pietro (1639). Corona della nobiltà d'Italia ovvero compendio dell'istorie delle famiglie illustri [Crown of Italian nobility or compendium of the histories of illustrious families].
- Rossi, Anton Domenico (1831). Ristretto di Storia Patria ad uso de' Piacentini [A Brief History of the Homeland for the Use of the People of Piacenza]. Vol. III.
- Rumor, Sebastiano (1901–1903). Il Blasone vicentino descritto e storicamente illustrato [The Vicentine coat of arms described and historically illustrated].
- Rumor, Sebastiano (1905–1908). Scrittori Vicentini dei secoli decimottavo e decimonono [Vicentine writers of the 18th and 19th centuries]. Vol. III.
- di Santa Maria, Angiolgabriello (1778). Biblioteca e Storia di quegli scrittori...di Vicenza [Library and History of those writers...of Vicenza].
- Schröder, Francesco (1830). Repertorio genealogico delle famiglie nobili nelle provincie venete [Genealogical repertoire of noble families in the Venetian provinces].
- Spreti, Vittorio (1932). Enciclopedia Storico Nobiliare Italiana [Italian Historical-Noble Encyclopedia]. Vol. VI.
- Trissino, Francesco (1853). Versi del Nobil Conte Francesco Trissino [Verses of the Noble Count Francesco Trissino].
- Trissino, Gaspare (1627). Acta S. Savinae Trissinae [Acts of Saint Savina Trissina].
- Trivelli, Giorgio, ed. (2003). Storia di Trissino [History of Trissino].
- Vallarsi, Jacopo, ed. (1729). Tutte le opere non più pubblicate di Giovan Giorgio Trissino [All the unpublished works of Giovan Giorgio Trissino].
