= January 30 =

January 30 this year in various calendars
- Friday, 30 January 2026
Akan	Nwonafie
Armenian	14 Mehekani 1475
Aztec	Toxcatl 20, 8 Tōchtli
Babylonian	10 Tebetu, 2336 SE
Balinese pawukon	Luang, Pepet, Beteng, Menala, Paing, Aryang, Sukra of Matal, Uma, Tulus, Manuh
Bengali	16 Magh, BS 1432
Chinese	Yang Wood Dragon・Ghost Mansion; Wood Snake Year, Month 12, Day 12 (Dahan, 5 days until Lichun)
Common Era	30 January 2026 CE
Coptic	22 Tobi, AM 1742
Egyptian	19 Payni, 2774 NE
Ethiopian	22 Ṭer, 2018 Amätä Məhrät
French Republican	Décade II, Primidi de Pluviôse de l'Année 234 de la République
Gregorian	30 January, AD 2026
Hebrew	12 Shevat, AM 5786
Hindu	Ārdrā・Vaidhṛti; Solar: 17 Māgha, 1947 SE; Lunisolar: Dvādaśī, Śukla pakṣa of Māgha, 2082 VE; Siddhārthin・5126 KY・1,872,605
Icelandic	Föstudagur, 8 Þorri 2025
Islamic	11 Sha'aban, AH 1447 (using tabular method)
ISO week date	2026-W05-5
Japanese	12 Shiwasu, Reiwa 8 (Daikan, 5 days until Risshun)
Julian	17 January, AD 2026 (AM 7534)
Julian day	2461071
Korean	12 Sodal, 4358 DE
Maya	13.0.13.5.8; 6 Pax, 8 Lamat
Roman	ante diem XVI Kalendas Februarias, MMDCCLXXIX AUC
Solar Hijri	10 Bahman, SH 1404
Tibetan	12 rgyal, shing mo sbrul 2152 or 1771 or 999

<<	January					>>
Su	Mo	Tu	We	Th	Fr	Sa
				1	2	3
4	5	6	7	8	9	10
11	12	13	14	15	16	17
18	19	20	21	22	23	24
25	26	27	28	29	30	31
2026

January 30 in recent years
2026 (Friday)
2025 (Thursday)
2024 (Tuesday)
2023 (Monday)
2022 (Sunday)
2021 (Saturday)
2020 (Thursday)
2019 (Wednesday)
2018 (Tuesday)
2017 (Monday)

January 30 is the 30th day of the year in the Gregorian calendar; 335 days remain until the end of the year (336 in leap years).

== Events ==
=== Pre-1600 ===
- 1018 – Poland and the Holy Roman Empire conclude the Peace of Bautzen.
- 1287 – King Wareru founds the Hanthawaddy kingdom, and proclaims independence from the Pagan Kingdom.

=== 1601–1900 ===
- 1607 – An estimated 200 square miles (51,800 ha) along the coasts of the Bristol Channel and Severn Estuary in England are destroyed by massive flooding, resulting in an estimated 2,000 deaths.
- 1648 – Eighty Years' War: The Treaty of Münster and Osnabrück is signed, ending the conflict between the Netherlands and Spain.
- 1649 – Charles I of England is executed in Whitehall, London.
- 1661 – Oliver Cromwell, Lord Protector of the Commonwealth of England, is ritually executed more than two years after his death, on the 12th anniversary of the execution of the monarch he himself deposed.
- 1667 – The Truce of Andrusovo is signed, ending the Russian-Polish War of 1654-1667.
- 1789 – Tây Sơn forces emerge victorious against Qing armies and liberate the capital Thăng Long.
- 1806 – The original Lower Trenton Bridge (also called the Trenton Makes the World Takes Bridge), which spans the Delaware River between Morrisville, Pennsylvania and Trenton, New Jersey, is opened.
- 1820 – Edward Bransfield sights the Trinity Peninsula and claims the discovery of Antarctica.
- 1826 – The Menai Suspension Bridge, considered the world's first modern suspension bridge, connecting the Isle of Anglesey to the northwest coast of Wales, is opened.
- 1835 – In the first assassination attempt against a President of the United States, Richard Lawrence attempts to shoot president Andrew Jackson, but fails and is subdued by a crowd, including several congressmen as well as Jackson himself.
- 1847 – Yerba Buena, California is renamed San Francisco, California.
- 1858 – The first Hallé concert is given in Manchester, England, marking the official founding of The Hallé orchestra as a full-time, professional orchestra.
- 1862 – American Civil War: The first American ironclad warship, the USS Monitor is launched.
- 1889 – Archduke Crown Prince Rudolf of Austria, heir to the Austro-Hungarian crown, is found dead with his mistress Baroness Mary Vetsera in the Mayerling.

=== 1901–present ===
- 1902 – The first Anglo-Japanese Alliance is signed in London.
- 1908 – Indian pacifist and leader Mohandas Karamchand Gandhi is released from prison by Jan C. Smuts after being tried and sentenced to two months in jail earlier in the month.
- 1911 – The destroyer USS Terry makes the first airplane rescue at sea saving the life of Douglas McCurdy 16 kilometres (10 miles) from Havana, Cuba.
- 1920 – Japanese carmaker Mazda is founded, initially as a cork-producing company.
- 1925 – The Government of Turkey expels Patriarch Constantine VI from Istanbul.
- 1930 – The Politburo of the Communist Party of the Soviet Union orders the confiscation of lands belonging to the Kulaks in a campaign of Dekulakization, resulting in the executions and forced deportations of millions.
- 1933 – Adolf Hitler's rise to power: Hitler takes office as the Chancellor of Germany.
- 1939 – During a speech in the Reichstag, Adolf Hitler makes a prediction about the end of the Jewish race in Europe if another world war were to occur.
- 1942 – World War II: Japanese forces invade the island of Ambon in the Dutch East Indies. Some 300 captured Allied troops are killed after the surrender. One-quarter of the remaining POWs remain alive at the end of the war.
- 1944 – World War II: The Battle of Cisterna, part of Operation Shingle, begins in central Italy.
- 1945 – World War II: The Wilhelm Gustloff, overfilled with German refugees, sinks in the Baltic Sea after being torpedoed by a Soviet submarine, killing approximately 9,500 people.
- 1945 – World War II: Raid at Cabanatuan: One hundred and twenty-six American Rangers and Filipino resistance fighters liberate over 500 Allied prisoners from the Japanese-controlled Cabanatuan POW camp.
- 1948 – British South American Airways' Tudor IV Star Tiger disappears over the Bermuda Triangle.
- 1948 – Following the assassination of Mahatma Gandhi in his home compound, India's prime minister, Jawaharlal Nehru, broadcasts to the nation, saying "The light has gone out of our lives". The date of the assassination becomes observed as "Martyrs' Day" in India.
- 1956 – In the United States, Civil Rights Movement leader Martin Luther King Jr.'s home is bombed in retaliation for the Montgomery bus boycott.
- 1959 – The forces of the Sultanate of Muscat occupy the last strongholds of the Imamate of Oman, Saiq and Shuraijah, marking the end of Jebel Akhdar War in Oman.
- 1959 – MS Hans Hedtoft, specifically designed to operate in icebound seas, strikes an iceberg on her maiden voyage and sinks, killing all 95 aboard.
- 1960 – The African National Party is founded in Chad, through the merger of traditionalist parties.
- 1964 – In a bloodless coup, General Nguyễn Khánh overthrows General Dương Văn Minh's military junta in South Vietnam.
- 1968 – Vietnam War: Tet Offensive launch by forces of the Viet Cong and North Vietnamese Army against South Vietnam, the United States, and their allies.
- 1969 – The Beatles' last public performance, on the roof of Apple Records in London. The impromptu concert is broken up by the police.
- 1972 – The Troubles: Bloody Sunday: British paratroopers open fire on anti-internment marchers in Derry, Northern Ireland, killing 13 people; another person later dies of injuries sustained.
- 1972 – Pakistan leaves the Commonwealth of Nations in protest of its recognition of breakaway Bangladesh.
- 1974 – Pan Am Flight 806 crashes near Pago Pago International Airport in American Samoa, killing 97.
- 1975 – The Monitor National Marine Sanctuary is established as the first United States National Marine Sanctuary.
- 1975 – Turkish Airlines Flight 345 crashes into the Sea of Marmara near Istanbul Yeşilköy Airport, killing 42.
- 1979 – A Varig Boeing 707-323C freighter, flown by the same commander as Flight 820, disappears over the Pacific Ocean 30 minutes after taking off from Tokyo.
- 1982 – Richard Skrenta writes the first PC virus code, which is 400 lines long and disguised as an Apple boot program called "Elk Cloner".
- 1989 – The American embassy in Kabul, Afghanistan is closed.
- 1995 – Hydroxycarbamide becomes the first approved preventive treatment for sickle cell disease.
- 2000 – Kenya Airways Flight 431 crashes into the Atlantic Ocean off the coast of Ivory Coast, killing 169.
- 2006 – The Goleta postal facility shootings occur, killing seven people before the perpetrator took her own life.
- 2007 – Microsoft Corporation releases Windows Vista, a major release of the operating system Microsoft Windows and the NT based kernel.
- 2013 – Naro-1 becomes the first carrier rocket launched by South Korea.
- 2020 – The World Health Organization declares the COVID-19 pandemic to be a Public Health Emergency of International Concern.

== Births ==
=== Pre-1600 ===
- 58 BC – Livia, Roman wife of Augustus (died 29)
- 1410 – William Calthorpe, English knight (died 1494)
- 1520 – William More, English courtier (died 1600)
- 1563 – Franciscus Gomarus, Dutch theologian and academic (died 1641)
- 1573 – Georg Friedrich, Margrave of Baden-Durlach (died 1638)
- 1580 – Gundakar, Prince of Liechtenstein, court official in Vienna (died 1658)
- 1590 – Lady Anne Clifford, 14th Baroness de Clifford (died 1676)

=== 1601–1900 ===
- 1628 – George Villiers, 2nd Duke of Buckingham, English statesman (died 1687)
- 1661 – Charles Rollin, French historian and educator (died 1741)
- 1697 – Johann Joachim Quantz, German flute player and composer (died 1773)
- 1703 – François Bigot, French politician (died 1778)
- 1720 – Charles De Geer, Swedish entomologist and archaeologist (died 1778)
- 1754 – John Lansing Jr., American lawyer and politician (died 1829)
- 1775 – Walter Savage Landor, English poet and author (died 1864)
- 1781 – Adelbert von Chamisso, German botanist and poet (died 1838)
- 1816 – Nathaniel P. Banks, American general and politician, 24th Governor of Massachusetts (died 1894)
- 1822 – Franz Ritter von Hauer, Austrian geologist and curator (died 1899)
- 1841 – Félix Faure, French politician, 7th President of France (died 1899)
- 1844 – Richard Theodore Greener, American lawyer, academic, and diplomat (died 1922)
- 1846 – Angela of the Cross, Spanish nun and saint (died 1932)
- 1861 – Charles Martin Loeffler, German-American violinist and composer (died 1935)
- 1862 – Walter Damrosch, German-American conductor and composer (died 1950)
- 1866 – Gelett Burgess, American author, poet, and critic (died 1951)
- 1878 – A. H. Tammsaare, Estonian author (died 1940)
- 1882 – Franklin D. Roosevelt, American lawyer and statesman, 32nd President of the United States (died 1945)
- 1889 – Jaishankar Prasad, Indian poet and playwright (died 1937)
- 1899 – Max Theiler, South African-American virologist and academic, Nobel Prize laureate (died 1972)
- 1900 – Martita Hunt, Argentine-born British actress (died 1969)

=== 1901–present ===
- 1901 – Rudolf Caracciola, German racing driver (died 1959)
- 1902 – Nikolaus Pevsner, German-English historian and scholar (died 1983)
- 1910 – Chidambaram Subramaniam, Indian lawyer and politician, Indian Minister of Defence (died 2000)
- 1911 – Roy Eldridge, American jazz trumpet player (died 1989)
- 1912 – Werner Hartmann, German physicist and academic (died 1988)
- 1912 – Francis Schaeffer, American pastor and theologian (died 1984)
- 1912 – Barbara W. Tuchman, American historian and author (died 1989)
- 1913 – Amrita Sher-Gil, Hungarian-Indian painter (died 1941)
- 1914 – Luc-Marie Bayle, French commander and painter (died 2000)
- 1914 – John Ireland, Canadian-American actor and director (died 1992)
- 1914 – David Wayne, American actor (died 1995)
- 1915 – Joachim Peiper, German SS officer (died 1976)
- 1915 – John Profumo, English soldier and politician, Secretary of State for War (died 2006)
- 1917 – Paul Frère, Belgian racing driver and journalist (died 2008)
- 1918 – David Opatoshu, American actor and screenwriter (died 1996)
- 1919 – Fred Korematsu, American activist (died 2005)
- 1920 – Michael Anderson, English director and producer (died 2018)
- 1920 – Patrick Heron, British painter (died 1999)
- 1920 – Delbert Mann, American director and producer (died 2007)
- 1922 – Dick Martin, American comedian, actor, and director (died 2008)
- 1923 – Marianne Ferber, Czech-American economist and author (died 2013)
- 1924 – Ernie Calverley, American basketball player and coach (died 2003)
- 1924 – S. N. Goenka, Burmese-Indian author and educator (died 2013)
- 1925 – Douglas Engelbart, American computer scientist, invented the computer mouse (died 2013)
- 1927 – Olof Palme, Swedish statesman, 26th Prime Minister of Sweden (died 1986)
- 1928 – Harold Prince, American director and producer (died 2019)
- 1928 – Paul Seymour, American basketball player and coach (died 1998)
- 1929 – Lois Hole, Canadian businesswoman and politician, 15th Lieutenant Governor of Alberta (died 2005)
- 1929 – Hugh Tayfield, South African cricketer (died 1994)
- 1929 – Lucille Teasdale-Corti, Canadian-Italian physician and humanitarian (died 1996)
- 1930 – Gene Hackman, American actor and author (died 2025)
- 1930 – Magnus Malan, South African general and politician, South African Minister of Defence (died 2011)
- 1931 – John Crosbie, Canadian lawyer and politician, 34th Canadian Minister of Justice (died 2020)
- 1931 – Shirley Hazzard, Australian-American novelist, short story writer, and essayist (died 2016)
- 1932 – Knock Yokoyama, Japanese comedian and politician (died 2007)
- 1934 – Tammy Grimes, American actress and singer (died 2016)
- 1935 – Richard Brautigan, American novelist, poet, and short story writer (died 1984)
- 1935 – Tubby Hayes, English saxophonist and composer (died 1973)
- 1936 – Horst Jankowski, German pianist and composer (died 1998)
- 1937 – Vanessa Redgrave, English actress
- 1937 – Boris Spassky, Russian chess grandmaster (died 2025)
- 1938 – Islam Karimov, Uzbek politician, 1st President of Uzbekistan (died 2016)
- 1941 – Gregory Benford, American astrophysicist and author
- 1941 – Dick Cheney, American businessman and politician, 46th Vice President of the United States (died 2025)
- 1941 – Tineke Lagerberg, Dutch swimmer
- 1942 – Marty Balin, American singer-songwriter and guitarist (died 2018)
- 1943 – Davey Johnson, American baseball player and manager (died 2025)
- 1944 – Lynn Harrell, American cellist and academic (died 2020)
- 1944 – Colin Rimer, English lawyer and judge
- 1945 – Meir Dagan, Israeli military officer and intelligence official, Director of Mossad (2002–11) (died 2016)
- 1945 – Michael Dorris, American author and scholar (died 1997)
- 1946 – John Bird, Baron Bird, English publisher, founded The Big Issue
- 1947 – Les Barker, English poet and author (died 2023)
- 1947 – Steve Marriott, English singer-songwriter and guitarist (died 1991)
- 1949 – Peter Agre, American physician and biologist, Nobel Prize laureate
- 1950 – Jack Newton, Australian golfer (died 2022)
- 1951 – Phil Collins, English drummer, singer-songwriter, producer, and actor
- 1951 – Charles S. Dutton, American actor and director
- 1951 – Bobby Stokes, English footballer (died 1995)
- 1952 – Doug Falconer, Canadian football player and producer (died 2021)
- 1953 – Fred Hembeck, American author and illustrator
- 1955 – John Baldacci, American politician, 73rd Governor of Maine
- 1955 – Curtis Strange, American golfer
- 1955 – Mychal Thompson, Bahamian-American basketball player and sportscaster
- 1956 – Ann Dowd, American actress
- 1957 – Chris Jansing, American television reporter
- 1957 – Payne Stewart, American golfer (died 1999)
- 1958 – Brett Butler, American actress
- 1959 – Jody Watley, American entertainer
- 1962 – Abdullah II of Jordan
- 1962 – Mary Kay Letourneau, American sex offender (died 2020)
- 1964 – Otis Smith, American basketball player, coach, and manager
- 1965 – Julie McCullough, American actress
- 1965 – Kevin Moore, Australian rugby league player and coach
- 1966 – Danielle Goyette, Canadian ice hockey player and coach
- 1968 – Felipe VI, King of Spain
- 1969 – Justin Skinner, English footballer and manager
- 1970 – Kimiya Yui, Japanese astronaut
- 1972 – Mike Johnson, American politician, 56th Speaker of the United States House of Representatives
- 1972 – Chris Simon, Canadian ice hockey player
- 1973 – Jalen Rose, American basketball player and sportscaster
- 1974 – Christian Bale, British actor
- 1974 – Olivia Colman, English actress
- 1975 – Juninho Pernambucano, Brazilian footballer
- 1976 – Andy Milonakis, American entertainer
- 1978 – Carmen Küng, Swiss curler
- 1978 – John Patterson, American baseball player
- 1979 – Trevor Gillies, Canadian ice hockey player
- 1980 – Lena Hall, American actress and singer
- 1980 – Josh Kelley, American singer-songwriter and musician
- 1980 – Georgios Vakouftsis, Greek footballer
- 1980 – Wilmer Valderrama, American actor and producer
- 1980 – Lee Zeldin, American politician and 17th Administrator of the Environmental Protection Agency.
- 1981 – Jonathan Bender, American basketball player
- 1981 – Dimitar Berbatov, Bulgarian footballer
- 1981 – Peter Crouch, English footballer
- 1981 – Mathias Lauda, Austrian racing driver
- 1982 – Jorge Cantú, American-Mexican baseball player
- 1982 – DeSagana Diop, Senegalese basketball player and coach
- 1982 – Cameron Wake, American football player
- 1983 – Drake Maverick, English wrestler
- 1983 – Slavko Vraneš, Montenegrin basketball player
- 1984 – Kid Cudi, American entertainer
- 1984 – Junior dos Santos, Brazilian mixed martial artist
- 1984 – Kotoshōgiku Kazuhiro, Japanese sumo wrestler
- 1985 – Gisela Dulko, Argentinian tennis player
- 1987 – Becky Lynch, Irish wrestler
- 1987 – Phil Lester, English Youtuber
- 1987 – Renato Santos, Brazilian footballer
- 1987 – Arda Turan, Turkish footballer
- 1989 – Jahvid Best, American football player and athlete
- 1989 – Kylie Bunbury, Canadian-American actress
- 1989 – Misha Zilberman, Israeli Olympic badminton player
- 1990 – Melissa Duncan, Australian track and field athlete
- 1990 – Eiza González, Mexican actress and singer
- 1990 – Luca Sbisa, Italian-Swiss ice hockey player and coach
- 1990 – Mitchell Starc, Australian cricketer
- 1990 – Jake Thomas, American actor
- 1991 – Stefan Elliott, Canadian ice hockey player
- 1991 – Jason Gastrow, American YouTuber
- 1993 – Katy Marchant, English track cyclist
- 1993 – Kodai Senga, Japanese baseball player
- 1993 – Thitipoom Techaapaikhun, Thai actor
- 1994 – Amelia Dimoldenberg, English comedian, writer and presenter
- 1995 – Danielle Campbell, American actress
- 1995 – Jack Laugher, English diver
- 1995 – Marcos Llorente, Spanish footballer
- 1996 – Dafne Navarro, Mexican trampoline gymnast
- 1997 – Thomas Chabot, Canadian ice hockey player
- 1997 – Colin White, American ice hockey player
- 2000 – Markella Kavenagh, Australian actress
- 2000 – Bryan Woo, American baseball player
- 2001 – Curtis Jones, English footballer
- 2002 – Tyla, South African singer and songwriter.
- 2002 – Bijan Robinson, American football player
- 2003 – Amen Thompson, American basketball player
- 2003 – Ausar Thompson, American basketball player
- 2005 – Prince Hashem, second son of King Abdullah II of Jordan

== Deaths ==
=== Pre-1600 ===
- 680 – Balthild, Frankish queen (born 626)
- 970 – Peter I of Bulgaria
- 1030 – William V of Aquitaine (born 969)
- 1181 – Emperor Takakura of Japan (born 1161)
- 1240 – Pelagio Galvani, Leonese lawyer and cardinal (born 1165)
- 1314 – Nicholas III of Saint Omer
- 1344 – William Montacute, 1st Earl of Salisbury (born 1301)
- 1384 – Louis II of Flanders (born 1330)
- 1574 – Damião de Góis, Portuguese historian and philosopher (born 1502)

=== 1601–1900 ===
- 1606 – Everard Digby, English criminal (born 1578)
- 1606 – John Grant, English conspirator (born 1570)
- 1606 – Robert Wintour, English conspirator (born 1565)
- 1649 – Charles I of England, Scotland, and Ireland (born 1600)
- 1664 – Cornelis de Graeff, Dutch mayor (born 1599)
- 1730 – Peter II of Russia (born 1715)
- 1770 – Giovanni Pietro Francesco Agius de Soldanis, Maltese linguist, historian and cleric (born 1712)
- 1836 – Betsy Ross, American seamstress, said to have designed the American Flag (born 1752)
- 1838 – Osceola, American tribal leader (born 1804)
- 1858 – Coenraad Jacob Temminck, Dutch zoologist and ornithologist (born 1778)
- 1867 – Emperor Kōmei of Japan (born 1831)
- 1869 – William Carleton, Irish author (born 1794)
- 1881 – Arthur O'Shaughnessy, English poet and herpetologist (born 1844)
- 1889 – Rudolf, Crown Prince of Austria, heir apparent to the throne of Austria-Hungary (born 1858)

=== 1901–present ===
- 1923 – Columba Marmion, Benedictine abbot (born 1858)
- 1926 – Barbara La Marr, American actress (born 1896)
- 1928 – Johannes Fibiger, Danish physician and academic, Nobel Prize laureate (born 1867)
- 1934 – Frank Nelson Doubleday, American publisher, founded the Doubleday Publishing Company (born 1862)
- 1947 – Frederick Blackman, English botanist and physiologist (born 1866)
- 1948 – Arthur Coningham, Australian air marshal (born 1895)
- 1948 – Mahatma Gandhi, leader of the Indian independence movement against British rule (born 1869)
- 1948 – Orville Wright, American pilot and engineer, co-founded the Wright Company (born 1871)
- 1951 – Ferdinand Porsche, Austrian-German engineer and businessman, founded Porsche (born 1875)
- 1958 – Jean Crotti, Swiss painter (born 1878)
- 1958 – Ernst Heinkel, German engineer and businessman; founded the Heinkel Aircraft Company (born 1888)
- 1962 – Manuel de Abreu, Brazilian physician and engineer (born 1894)
- 1963 – Francis Poulenc, French pianist and composer (born 1899)
- 1966 – Jaan Hargel, Estonian flute player, conductor, and educator (born 1912)
- 1968 – Makhanlal Chaturvedi, Indian poet, playwright, and journalist (born 1889)
- 1969 – Dominique Pire, Belgian friar, Nobel Prize laureate (born 1910)
- 1973 – Elizabeth Baker, American economist and academic (born 1885)
- 1973 – Titina Silá, Bissau-Guinean revolutionary (born 1943)
- 1974 – Olav Roots, Estonian pianist and composer (born 1910)
- 1977 – Paul Marais de Beauchamp, French zoologist (born 1883)
- 1980 – Professor Longhair, American singer-songwriter and pianist (born 1918)
- 1982 – Lightnin' Hopkins, American singer-songwriter and guitarist (born 1912)
- 1991 – John Bardeen, American physicist and engineer, Nobel Prize laureate (born 1908)
- 1991 – Clifton C. Edom, American photographer and educator (born 1907)
- 1993 – Alexandra of Yugoslavia, the last Queen of Yugoslavia (born 1921)
- 1994 – Pierre Boulle, French soldier and author (born 1912)
- 1999 – Huntz Hall, American actor (born 1919)
- 1999 – Ed Herlihy, American journalist (born 1909)
- 2001 – Jean-Pierre Aumont, French soldier and actor (born 1911)
- 2001 – Johnnie Johnson, English air marshal and pilot (born 1915)
- 2001 – Joseph Ransohoff, American surgeon and educator (born 1915)
- 2004 – Egon Mayer, Swiss-American sociologist (born 1944)
- 2005 – Martyn Bennett, Canadian-Scottish violinist (born 1971)
- 2006 – Coretta Scott King, American author and activist (born 1927)
- 2006 – Wendy Wasserstein, American playwright and academic (born 1950)
- 2007 – Sidney Sheldon, American author and screenwriter (born 1917)
- 2008 – Marcial Maciel, Mexican-American priest, founded the Legion of Christ and Regnum Christi (born 1920)
- 2009 – H. Guy Hunt, American soldier, pastor, and politician, 49th Governor of Alabama (born 1933)
- 2010 – Fadil Ferati, Kosovar accountant and politician (born 1960)
- 2011 – John Barry, English composer and conductor (born 1933)
- 2012 – Frank Aschenbrenner, American football player and soldier (born 1925)
- 2012 – Doeschka Meijsing, Dutch author (born 1947)
- 2013 – Gamal al-Banna, Egyptian author and scholar (born 1920)
- 2013 – Patty Andrews, American singer (born 1918)
- 2013 – George Witt, American baseball player and coach (born 1931)
- 2014 – Stefan Bałuk, Polish general and photographer (born 1914)
- 2014 – The Mighty Hannibal, American singer-songwriter and producer (born 1939)
- 2014 – Russell D. Hemenway, American political activist (born 1925)
- 2014 – William Motzing, American composer and conductor (born 1937)
- 2014 – Arthur Rankin Jr., American director, producer, and screenwriter (born 1924)
- 2014 – Greater, oldest known greater flamingo and Feast Festival 2021 mascot (h. c.1919–1933)
- 2015 – Carl Djerassi, Austrian-American chemist, author, and playwright (born 1923)
- 2015 – Ülo Kaevats, Estonian academic, philosopher, and politician (born 1947)
- 2015 – Geraldine McEwan, English actress (born 1932)
- 2015 – Gerrit Voorting, Dutch cyclist (born 1923)
- 2015 – Zhelyu Zhelev, Bulgarian philosopher and politician, 2nd President of Bulgaria (born 1935)
- 2016 – Frank Finlay, English actor (born 1926)
- 2016 – Francisco Flores Pérez, Salvadorian politician, President of El Salvador (born 1959)
- 2016 – Georgia Davis Powers, American activist and politician (born 1923)
- 2016 – Gaston Mialaret, French pedagogist and professor (born 1918)
- 2018 – Mark Salling, American actor and musician (born 1982)
- 2019 – Dick Miller, American actor (born 1928)
- 2021 – Sophie, Scottish musician (born 1986)
- 2022 – Cheslie Kryst, American television presenter and model (born 1991)
- 2023 – Bobby Beathard, American Pro Football Hall of Fame executive (born 1937)
- 2023 – Bobby Hull, Canadian ice hockey player (born 1939)
- 2024 – Chita Rivera, American actress, singer, and dancer (born 1933)
- 2025 – Dick Button, American figure skater and actor (born 1929)
- 2025 – Julius Chan, Papua New Guinean politician, 2nd Prime Minister of Papua New Guinea (born 1939)
- 2025 – Marianne Faithfull, English singer-songwriter and actress (born 1946)
- 2025 – Edcel Lagman, Filipino politician (born 1942)
- 2026 – Catherine O'Hara, Canadian-American actress, comedian and screenwriter (born 1954)

== Holidays and observances ==
- Christian Feast Day:
  - Adelelmus of Burgos
  - Aldegonde
  - Anthony the Great (Coptic Church)
  - Armentarius of Pavia
  - Balthild
  - Charles, King and Martyr (various provinces of the Anglican Communion)
  - Hyacintha Mariscotti
  - Martina
  - Matthias of Jerusalem
  - Mutien-Marie Wiaux
  - Savina
  - Three Holy Hierarchs (Eastern Orthodox), and its related observances:
    - Teacher's Day (Greece)
  - January 30 (Eastern Orthodox liturgics)
- Day of Azerbaijani customs (Azerbaijan)
- Day of Saudade (Brazil)
- Fred Korematsu Day (California, Florida, Hawaii, Virginia)
- Martyrdom of Mahatma Gandhi, and its related observances:
  - Martyrs' Day (India)
  - School Day of Non-violence and Peace (Spain)
  - Start of the Season for Nonviolence (January 30 – April 4)
