= Albert Gabriel =

French architect and professor (1883–1972)

- Albert-Louis Gabriel
- Born: 2 August 1883; Cerisières, Haute-Marne, France
- Died: 23 December 1972 (aged 89); Bar-sur-Aube, Aube, France
- Occupation: Academic

Academic background
- Education: Architecture, Literature
- Alma mater: Ecole nationale des beaux-arts; University of Paris

Albert-Louis Gabriel (2 August 1883 – 23 December 1972) was a French architect, painter, archaeologist, art historian and traveller. He conducted archaeological works in Greece, Egypt, Turkey and study trips in Iraq, Iran and Syria. He taught art history and Islamic art at French and Turkish universities. He authored a number of books based on his research work.

== Personal life ==
Albert Gabriel was born on 2 August 1883 in his maternal grandfather's house at Cerisières town of Haute-Marne Department in France. His father was an experienced architect. He had a brother and a sister.

After completing his primary education in Bar-sur-Aube, Gabriel chose his father's profession despite all contrary insistence. He studied Architecture at the Ecole nationale des beaux-arts (National School of Fine Art), and Literature at the University of Paris (Sorbonne) at the same time. He graduated with the titles Master of Architecture and Licencié ès lettres. In 1921, he earned a Docteur ès lettres title from Sorbonne.

After his retirement, he lived in the father's villa at Bar-sur-Aube. In the more than twenty rooms, he stored his memoires, pictures, surveys and furniture he collected in Turkey, in addition to a large library. In winter months, he used to stay with his brother's house in Paris.

Gabriel, who remained unmarried like his siblings, died on 23 December 1972 at age 89. Following the religious ceremony held at the Church of Saint-Pierre, he was buried in the town cemetery on 27 December.

== Architect in Archaeology ==
Gabriel's success started already in the early years of his professional life. In 1903, he was honored with the Jean Leclaire Award of the Fine Arts Academy. He started to work as an architect at the 1846-established French Archeology Institute in Athens, Greece. Between 1908 and 1911, doing his assignment on the island of Delos (Cyclades), where he was in charge of drawing the building surveys in the excavationson, he learned an environment that would guide all his work.

In 1908, he travelled for the first time to Istanbul, Ottoman Empire (today Turkey). He took part with his watercolor paintings and surveys at the French Artists Exhibition (Salon des Artistes Français) held in Germany and Spain in 1910, and received an honorable mention. The following year, he received a second place medal for the "Hellenistic houses surveys of Delos", and he was also granted a state scholarship for a study trip. In 1911, Gabriel was given the task of detecting the medieval works, such as the historical castle, other buildings and structures, left by the Knights Hospitaller on the island of Rhodes, which was about to leave the for nearly four centuries Ottoman rule at that time. Rhodes was seized by Italians in 1912 during the Italo-Turkish War. Gabriel worked on Rhodes until 1914, the outbreak of World War I. During WWI, he served as a naval reserve officer in the French Navy.

In 1919, he returned to his profession, and worked at excavations in Al-Fustat, Egypt. Until 1920, he was helpful to Egyptian archaeologists in unearthing the city of Fustat, the first capital of Egypt under Muslim rule. Based on his research and surveys about Rhodes and his work on Al-Fustat, he received a Doctor's degree in 1921. Between 1920 and 1922, he continued his work on Rhodes, and restored the "Auberge de France" into its original form, an inn built and used by the Knights Hospitaller, and used as an office by French consul, and later as a family house by Ottoman Turks. His research on Rhodes got published in two volumes under the title La Cité de Rhodes, Topographie, Architecture Militaire (Paris 1921) and La Cité de Rhodes, Architecture Civile et Religieuse (Paris 1923). After seriously damaged by an attack of a British bomber plane in 1945, the building was restored again by Gabriel between 1946 and 1950. As a French officer in 1922, he toured in the old Lycia and Cilicia regions, southern Anatolia. Rhodes surveys, which were exhibited in the French artists' exhibition in 1923, enabled him to receive the first prize, and the Louis Fould Award of the Fine Arts Academy the same year.

== Academic career ==
In 1923, Gabriel was appointed Associate professor of Art history at the Faculty of Letters of the University of Caen Normandy, France. In 1925, he was promoted to full professorhip for Art History to serve in the Faculty of Letters of University of Strasbourg, France. The same year, he worked in the ancient city of Palmyra, and undertook study tours in the French Mandate Syria. In 1926, he was appointed Professor of Archaeology and Art History at the Faculty of Letters in Istanbul University, the only university at that time in the Republic of Turkey. His lesson were simultaneously interpreted from French into Turkish language for students. He served at this post until 1930. He also conducted research work on Turkish architecture and art in Anatolia upon request of the Ministry of National Education that lasted with interruptions until the World War II years. His findings cbecame the subject of his important works introducing Anatolian Turkish art. He published papers on the mosques of Istanbul, the art history of Ottoman miniatures and the topography of the city.

In 1941 after his return home, he was appointed professor of History of Islamic Oriental Arts at the Collège de France in Paris, France. He served at this post until his retirement in 1953. In 1943, he published a book on the "Turkish Castled on the Bosphorus". In 1956, he published Turkish art in Bursa, a former capital of the Ottoman Empire, in two big volumes. Based on his archaeological research in Phrygia, particularly in Midas City, he published his work's Exploration archéologique en Phrygie ("Archaeological Exploration in Phrtgia") first volume in 1952 and the second volume in 1965.

== French Archaeology Institut in Istanbul ==
Upon the initiative of Gabriel, the French Government provided in 1931 financial support for the establishment of the French Archaeology Institute within the Consulate General of France in Istanbul. He became the director of the Institute, and served at this post until his return to France in March 1941 due to WWII. In Mai 1946, he went to Istanbul again, and took over the director post at the institute a second time, and served officially until 1956 while being present in the institute rarely. From 1951 until 1956, he published the annual preidical Anadolu, which contained archaeological and art historical research work in Turkey.

In 1932, Gabriel conducted research work in Southeastern Anatolia Region upon request of the Turkish Ministry of National Education. He undertook study a trip to Iraq and Iran in 1934, and did research on the Jameh Mosque of Isfahan. In 1936, he toured in Syria.

== Honours and Memberships ==
- 1903 – Jean Leclaire Award of the Fine Arts Academy, Paris, France,
- 1923 – Louis Fould Award of the Fine Arts Academy, Paris, France,
- 1932 – Member of the German Archaeological Institute,
- 1933 – Corresponding member of the Académie des Inscriptions et Belles-Lettres.
- 1940 – Honorary member of the Turkish Historical Society,
- 1950 – Prof. honoris causa from Ankara University, Turkey,
- 1955 – Honorary citizen of Istanbul, Turkey
- 1955 – Honorary citizen of Bursa, Turkey.
- 1960 – Honorary member of Royal Academies for Science and the Arts of Belgium',
- 1968 – Doctor honoris causa from Istanbul University, Turkey.
- Chevaliers of the Légion d'honneur

== Bibliography ==
- Albert Gabriel 1883–1972 Mimar Arkeolog Ressam Gezgin (in Turkish). Yapı Kredi Yayınları. 27 September 2006. p. 439. ISBN 978-975-081-131-9.
- Arıkan, Zeki. Albert Gabriel (1883-1972).
