= Albareto (Ziano Piacentino) =

- Frazione
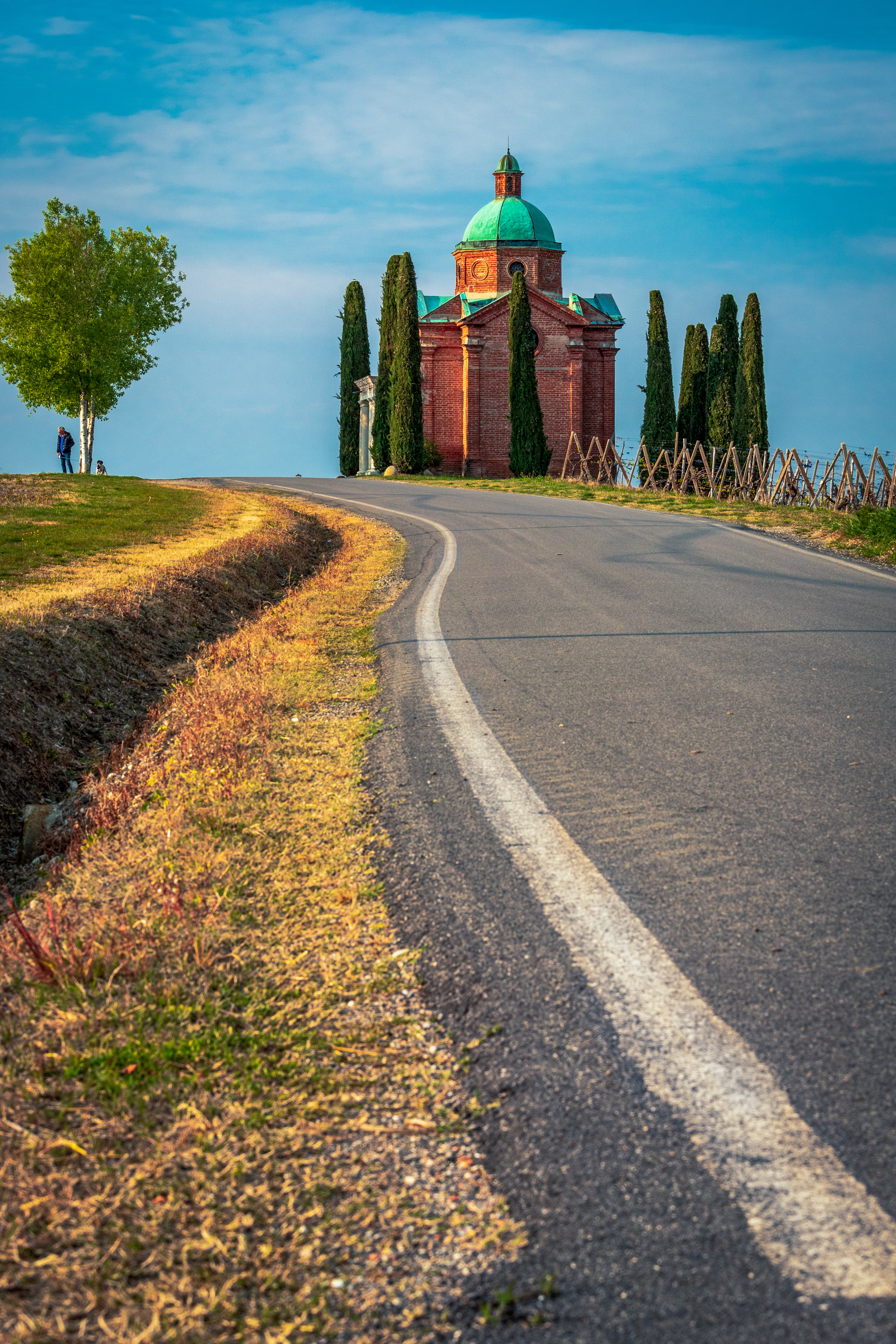
- The saint Lupo sacellum

- Location of Albareto in Italy
- Coordinates: 44°58′42.13″N 9°14′29.3″E
- Country: Italy
- Region: Emilia-Romagna
- Province: Piacenza (PC)
- Comune: Ziano Piacentino
- Elevation: 270 m (890 ft)

Population
  - Total: 151
- Time zone: UTC+1 (CET)
  - Summer (DST): UTC+2 (CEST)
- Postal code: 29010
- Dialing code: 0523

Albareto is a frazione of the comune of Ziano Piacentino (Province of Piacenza) in the Italian region Emilia-Romagna, located about 28 km southwest of Piacenza.

== Geography ==
Albareto is located at an altitude of 270 m above sea level, a short distance from the line of the 45th parallel north, the equidistant line between the North Pole and the equator.

== History ==
The first settlements in Albareto date back to the early 14th century. Later, the territory was granted as a fief to the Tradicini family. From the 16th century onward, as evidenced by the Farnese family's rural land records, the local economy was primarily based on viticulture.

In 1632, the local church, dedicated to saints Nabor and Felix, was consecrated by the bishop of Piacenza, Alessandro Scappi.

== Culture ==
=== Churces ===
- The Church of saints Nabor and Felix: originally built at an undetermined date, it was rebuilt in the 17th century and features a baroque façade. The bell tower, located to the right, rests on a square base and terminates in a nave pierced by four lancet windows. The interior consists of a single nave with three barrel-vaulted bays: the baptismal font and confessional are located in the first bay, while the second bay contains two chapels, one dedicated to Saint Joseph and the other to the Virgin Mary.
- Our Lady of saint Lupo sacellum: a small religious building constructed in the 19th century on a pre-existing structure, the result of the popular devotion of the inhabitants. Its reconstruction was undertaken by a father who made a vow after the healing of his son, which occurred following prayers near the sanctuary.

== Bibliography ==
- Molossi, Lorenzo (1832–1834). Vocabolario topografico dei ducati di Parma, Piacenza e Guastalla. Parma: Tipografia Ducale.

== See also ==
- Province of Piacenza
