= Ziano Piacentino =

- Comune
- Comune di Ziano Piacentino
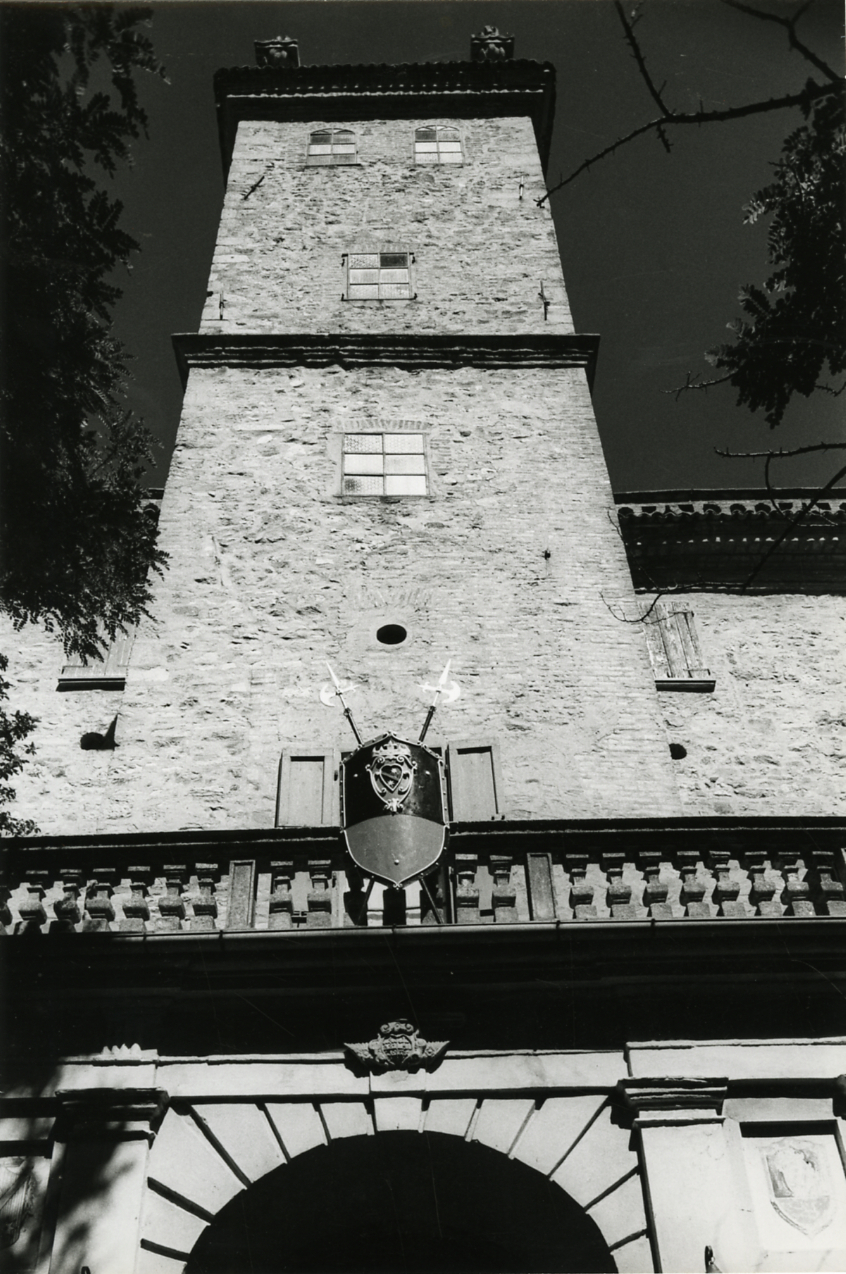
- Castle of Montalbo in 1981.

- Location within Italy Location within Emilia-Romagna
- Coordinates: 45°0′N 9°24′E
- Country: Italy
- Region: Emilia-Romagna
- Province: Piacenza (PC)
- Frazioni: Albareto, Calcinara, Fornello, Montalbo, Seminò, Vicobarone, Vicomarino

Government
  - Mayor: Manuel Ghilardelli

Area
  - Total: 32.78 km^{2} (12.66 sq mi)
- Elevation: 220 m (720 ft)

Population (28 February 2017)
  - Total: 2,534
  - Density: 77.30/km^{2} (200.2/sq mi)
- Demonym: Zianesi
- Time zone: UTC+1 (CET)
  - Summer (DST): UTC+2 (CEST)
- Postal code: 29010
- Dialing code: 0523
- Patron saint: St. Paul
- Saint day: 25 January
- Website: Official website

Ziano Piacentino (Piacentino: Ṡiàn) is a comune (municipality) in the Province of Piacenza in the Italian region of Emilia-Romagna, located about 160 kilometres (99 mi) northwest of Bologna and about 25 kilometres (16 mi) west of Piacenza. Ziano Piacentino borders the following municipalities: Alta Val Tidone, Borgonovo Val Tidone, Castel San Giovanni, Rovescala, Santa Maria della Versa.

== Twin towns ==
Ziano Piacentino is twinned with:

- Pont-de-l'Isère, France
