= Nabor and Felix =

Christian martyrs (d. ca. 303 AD)

Saints Nabor and Felix
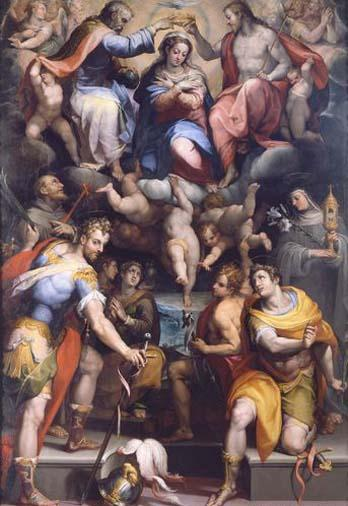
- Saints Nabor and Felix (foreground), with the Virgin Mary, Saint Francis, Saint Claire, Saint John the Baptist, Saint Mary Magdalene, and Saint Catherine. Orazio Samacchini, ca. 1570.

Martyrs
- Born: 3rd century Mauretania Caesariensis (modern-day Algeria)
- Died: c. 303; Laus Pompeia, Italy
- Venerated in: Roman Catholic Church; Eastern Orthodox Church
- Major shrine: Milan, Italy
- Feast: July 12
- Attributes: two young men in military attire; palms

Nabor and Felix (d. c. AD 303) were Christian martyrs thought to have been killed during the Great Persecution under the Roman emperor Diocletian. A tomb in Milan is believed to contain their relics.

== Legend ==
In the apocryphal "Acts of Saints Nabor and Felix" (which are imitated from the Acts of other martyrs (such as those of Saint Firmus and Saint Rusticus), the two are said to have been Roman soldiers from Mauretania Caesariensis serving under Maximian. They were condemned in Milan and executed by decapitation in Laus Pompeia (Lodi Vecchio).

A pair of saints "Nabor and Felix" were also said to have been martyred at Nicopolis in Lesser Armenia in AD 320 alongside SS "Januarius and Marinus". They may be distinct or may have been a merging of the story of the Italian saints with the local couple Januarius and Pelagia. (Note: Marinus being the male form of the Greek name Pelagios and gender bending being a common theme among the many saints conflated with St Pelagia the Harlot.) The feast day of Januarius and Pelagia was observed on July 11 and that of the quartet on July 10.

== Veneration ==
In early 4th-century, their relics were translated, probably by the Bishop of Milan Maternus from their place of interment to a place outside the walls of Milan, placed a few hundred meters north of the present Basilica of Sant'Ambrogio. A church (Basilica Naboriana) was built over their new tomb, as recorded by Paulinus of Milan in his life of Saint Ambrose. Tradition states that Savina of Milan died while praying at the tomb of Nabor and Felix. Saint Ambrose wrote a hymn about them.

When Emperor Frederick Barbarossa captured Milan in 1158, he gave some of the relics of Saints Felix and Nabor to Rainald of Dassel, archbishop of Cologne, who brought them to his episcopal see. The relics associated with Felix and Nabor are situated in a chapel in Cologne Cathedral. Nabor and Felix are depicted on the 1181 "Shrine of the Three Kings" by Nicholas of Verdun in Cologne Cathedral.

In 1258 their relics were moved to the church of Saint Francis of Assisi that was erected in place of the Basilica Naboriana. On 14-16 April 1798, shortly before the demolition of the church of Saint Francis of Assisi, their relics were translated in the Basilica of Sant'Ambrogio. Their relics are placed today in an ancient sarcophagus in the right nave of Sant'Ambrogio Basilica along with the relics of Saint Maternus and of Saint Valeria.

=== Feast day ===
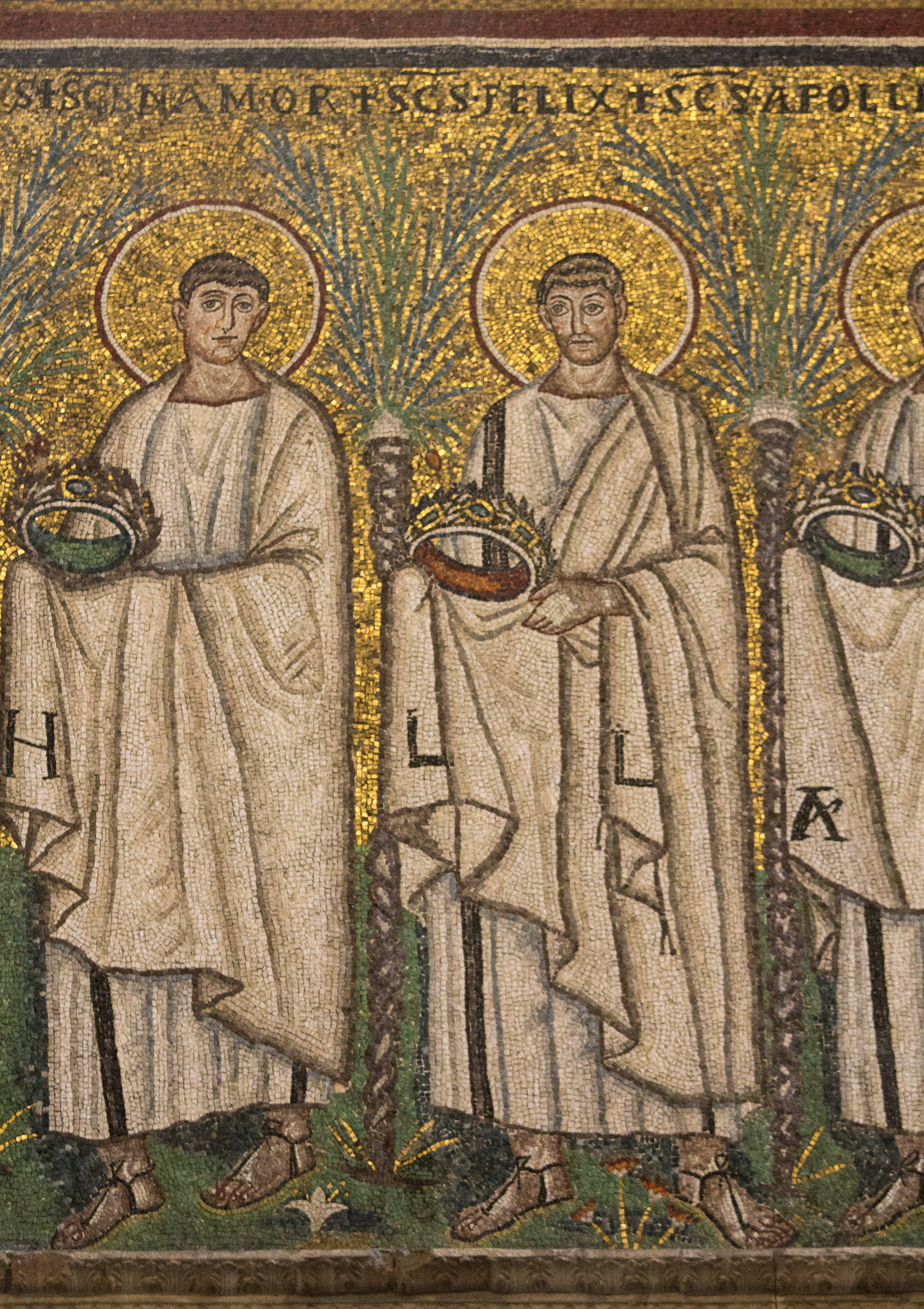
Mosaic from the Basilica of Sant'Apollinare Nuovo

The Roman Catholic Church recognizes Nabor and Felix as martyr saints, inserting them, under the date of 12 July, in the Roman Martyrology, its official list of saints. They were also included in the General Roman Calendar from before the 12th century. with a feast day that was reduced to a commemoration when Saint John Gualbert was added to the calendar in 1595. The 1969 revision removed mention of Nabor and Felix from the General Roman Calendar, but the rules in the Roman Missal published in the same year authorizes celebration of their Mass on their feast day everywhere, unless in some locality an obligatory celebration is assigned to that day.

=== Desventuradas Islands ===
The Desventuradas Islands, San Félix and San Ambrosio, were sighted by Juan Fernández in 1574. Pedro Sarmiento de Gamboa wrote in 1579 that "they are now called after St Felix and St Ambor (i.e. Felix and Nabor)." Due to linguistic corruption, the name Ambor (Nabor) became confused with that of the more famous Bishop of Milan Saint Ambrose (San Ambrosio).

== See also ==
- Other saints Felix
- Albareto
