= Maternus (bishop of Milan) =

Christian saint

- Archbishop of Milan
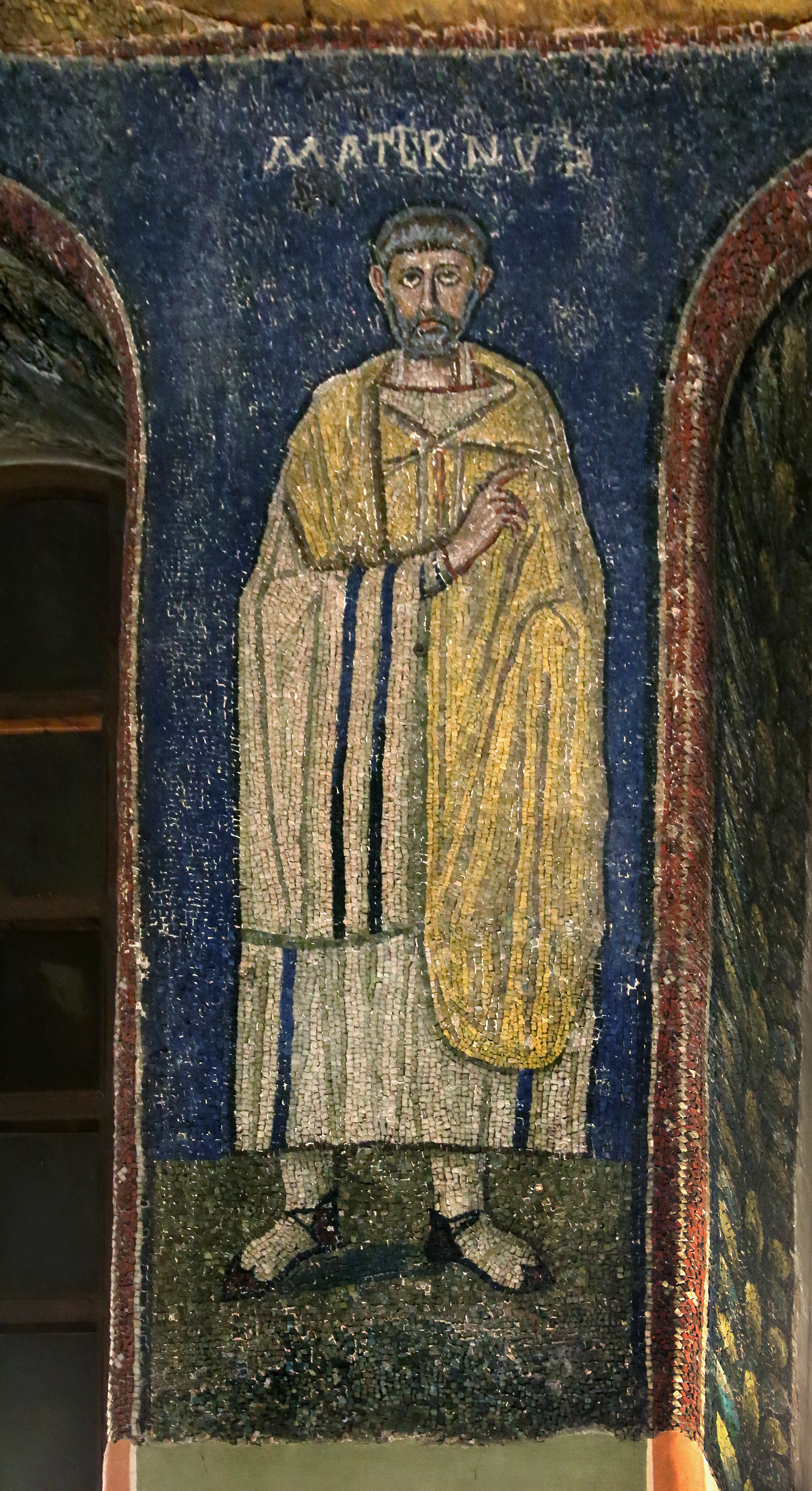
- 5th-century mosaic of Maternus located in Sacello of San Vittore in Ciel d'Oro, inside the basilica of San Ambrogio
- Church: Catholic Church
- Appointed: c. 316 AD
- Term ended: c. 328 AD
- Predecessor: Mirocles
- Successor: Protasius

Personal details
- Born: c. 3rd century AD
- Died: 18 July 328 AD Milan, Roman Italy, Roman Empire

Sainthood
- Feast day: 18 July
- Venerated in: Catholic Church

Maternus (Italian: Materno, Born c. 3rd century AD - died 18 July 328 AD) was Archbishop of Milan from c. 316 to c. 328. He is honoured as a Saint in the Catholic Church and his feast day is on July 18.

== Life ==
Almost nothing is known about the life of Maternus. In 316, he was elected bishop of Milan by acclamation, both clergy and people insisting on having him for their Pastor; and reigned until about 328.

Maternus is believed to have discovered at Lodi Vecchio the remains of saints Nabor and Felix, who had been martyred during the reign of Emperor Diocletian in 303, and then relocated these relics to Milan, where a church known as the (Basilica Naboriana) was built in their honor. Maternus also completed the construction of the Basilica vetus, which had been started in 313 and was the first cathedral of Milan, located in the area now occupied by the present Cathedral of Milan.

He was beloved even by the Pagans; he encouraged and comforted his flock during the persecution under Diocletian. There are three versions of the "Martyrdom of Alexander". The longest recounts conversions performed by Maternus, including that of Fidelis of Como. Maternus and Fidelis purportedly visited Alexander in prison.

He built the chapel of San Vittore in Ciel d'Oro to house the relics of Saint Victor just outside the city walls. It became part of Ambrose's Basilica Martyrum, (later named after Ambrose).

Maternus died c. 328 on July 18, which was later set as his feast day by the Catholic Church. His body was buried in the Basilica Naboriana, that in 1258 was enlarged and dedicated to Saint Francis of Assisi. On April 14, 1798, shortly before the demolition of the church, his body was moved to the Basilica of Sant'Ambrogio, located a few hundred meters to the south. They reside there today in an ancient sarcophagus within the right-hand nave of the church, along with the relics of Saints Nabor and Felix, as well as Saint Valeria.
