= University of Caen Normandy =

French university

- Université de Caen Normandie
- Latin: Universitas Cadomensis
- Former name: University of Caen
- Established: 1432; 594 years ago
- Founder: John of Lancaster, Duke of Bedford
- Budget: €247 M (2022)
- President: Lamri Adoui (since 2020)
- Faculty: 1,575 (2020–2021)
- Total staff: 2,684 (2020–2021)
- Students: 33,349 (2020–2021)
- Location: Caen, France; 49.1906°N 0.3644°W
- Website: www.unicaen.fr

The University of Caen Normandy (French: Université de Caen Normandie), also known as Unicaen, is a public university in Caen, France.

== History ==
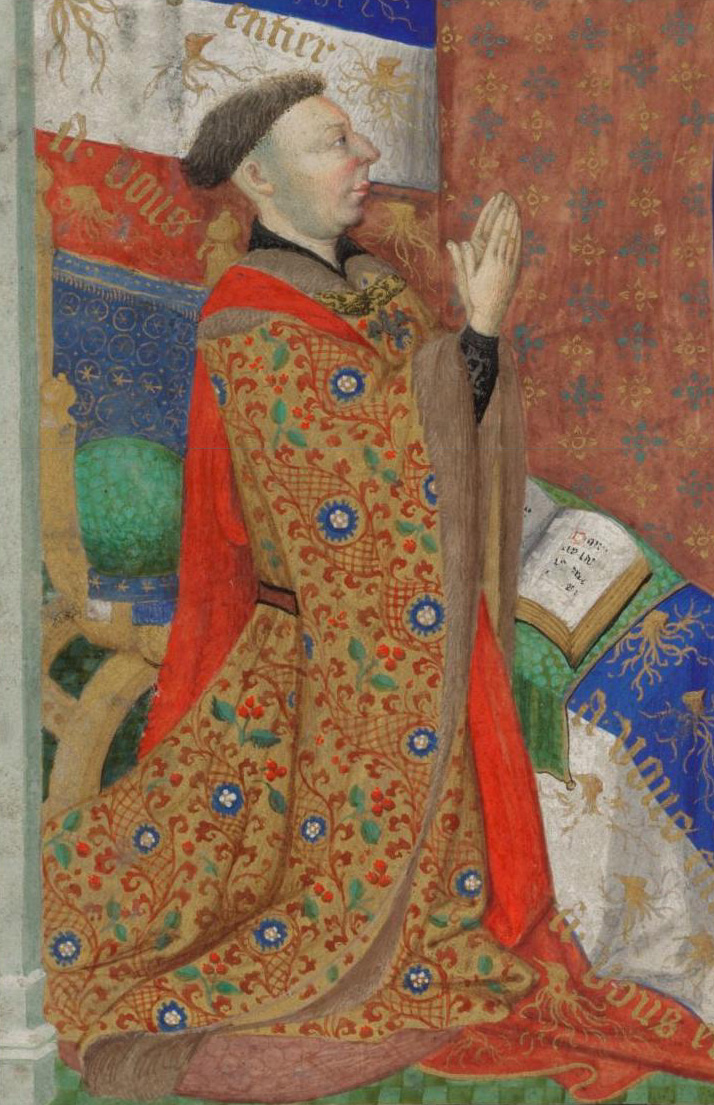
John of Lancaster, 1st Duke of Bedford, founder of the University, from the Bedford Hours in the British Library

The institution was founded in 1432 by John of Lancaster, 1st Duke of Bedford, the first rector being a Cornishman, Michael Tregury, afterwards Archbishop of Dublin. It originally consisted of a faculty of Canon Law and a faculty of Law. By 1438, it already had five faculties. The foundation was confirmed by the King of France Charles VII the Victorious in 1452.

On 7 July 1944 the university was completely destroyed by aerial bombing during Operation Charnwood, an action of the Battle of Caen. Between 1944 and 1954, the university was based in the buildings of the regional teachers' college. A new campus was designed by Henry Bernard and constructed between 1948 and 1957. The new university was inaugurated on 1 and 2 June 1957. Its logo, the mythical Phoenix, symbolises this revival.

== Rankings ==
Global Rankings
Ranking	Rank
CWUR World	808 (2020-21)
QS World	1201+ (2022)

Shanghai Ranking 2022
Subject	Rank
Oceanography	151
Medical technology	201
Mathematics	301
Chemistry	401
Clinical medicine	401

== Notable people ==
=== Notable alumni ===
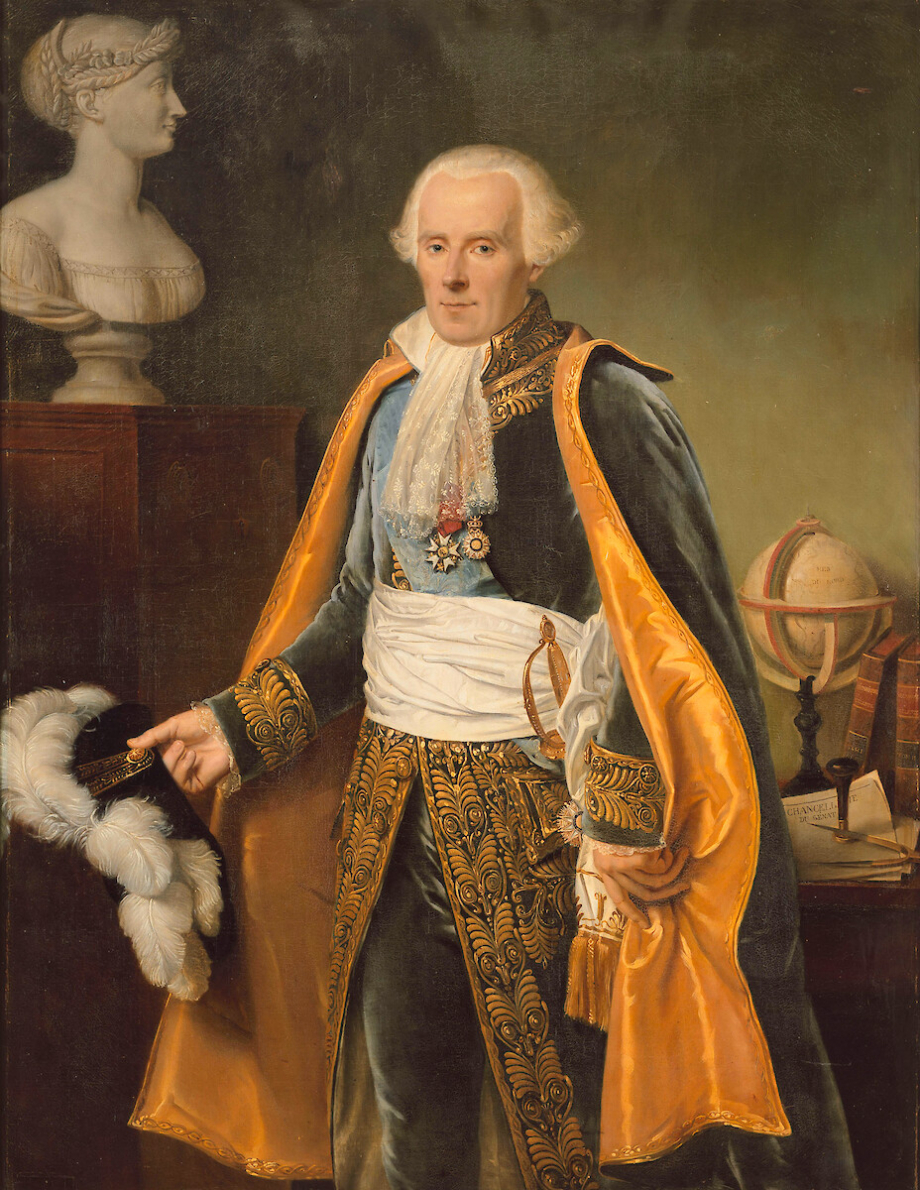
Pierre-Simon de Laplace

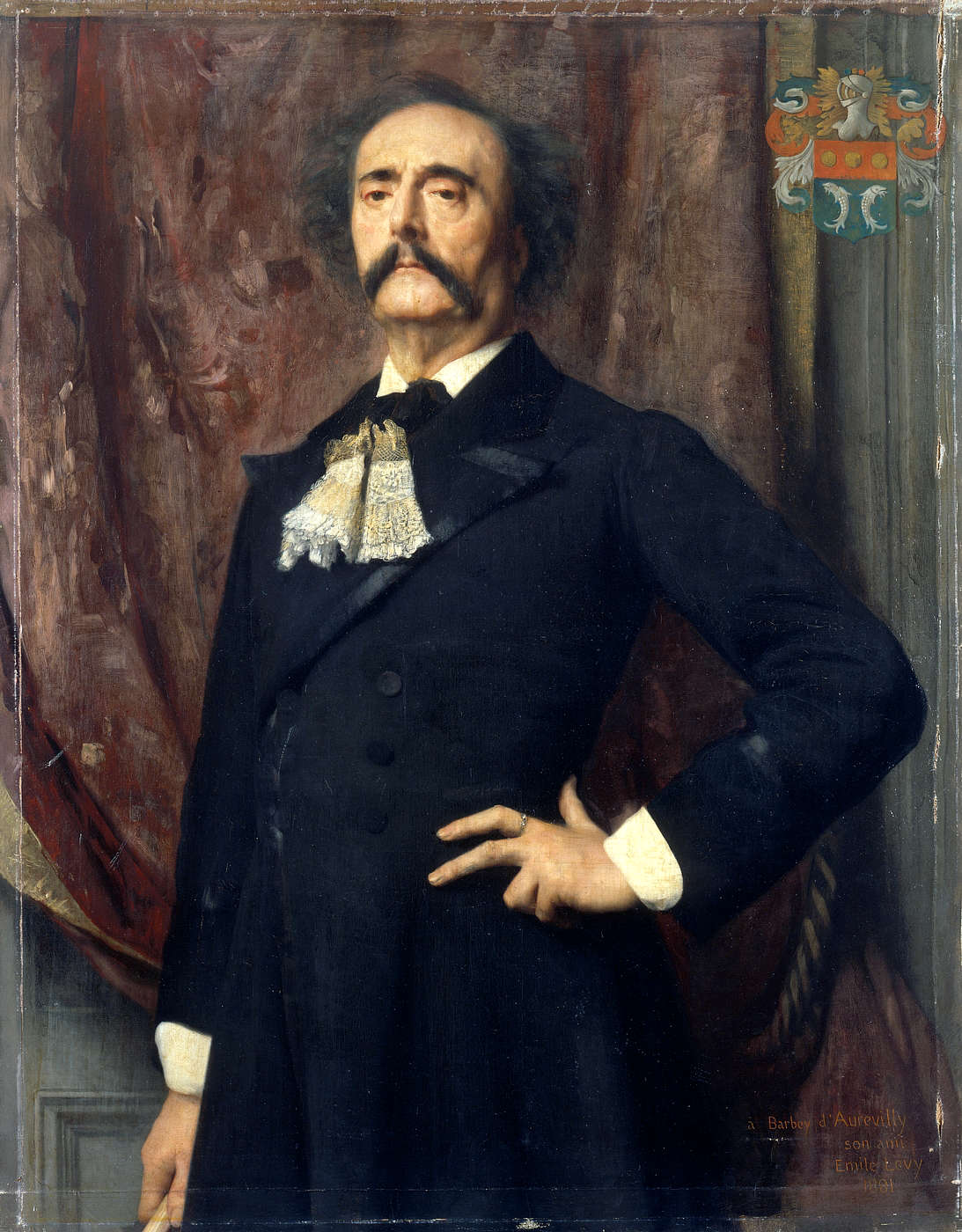
Jules Barbey d'Aurevilly

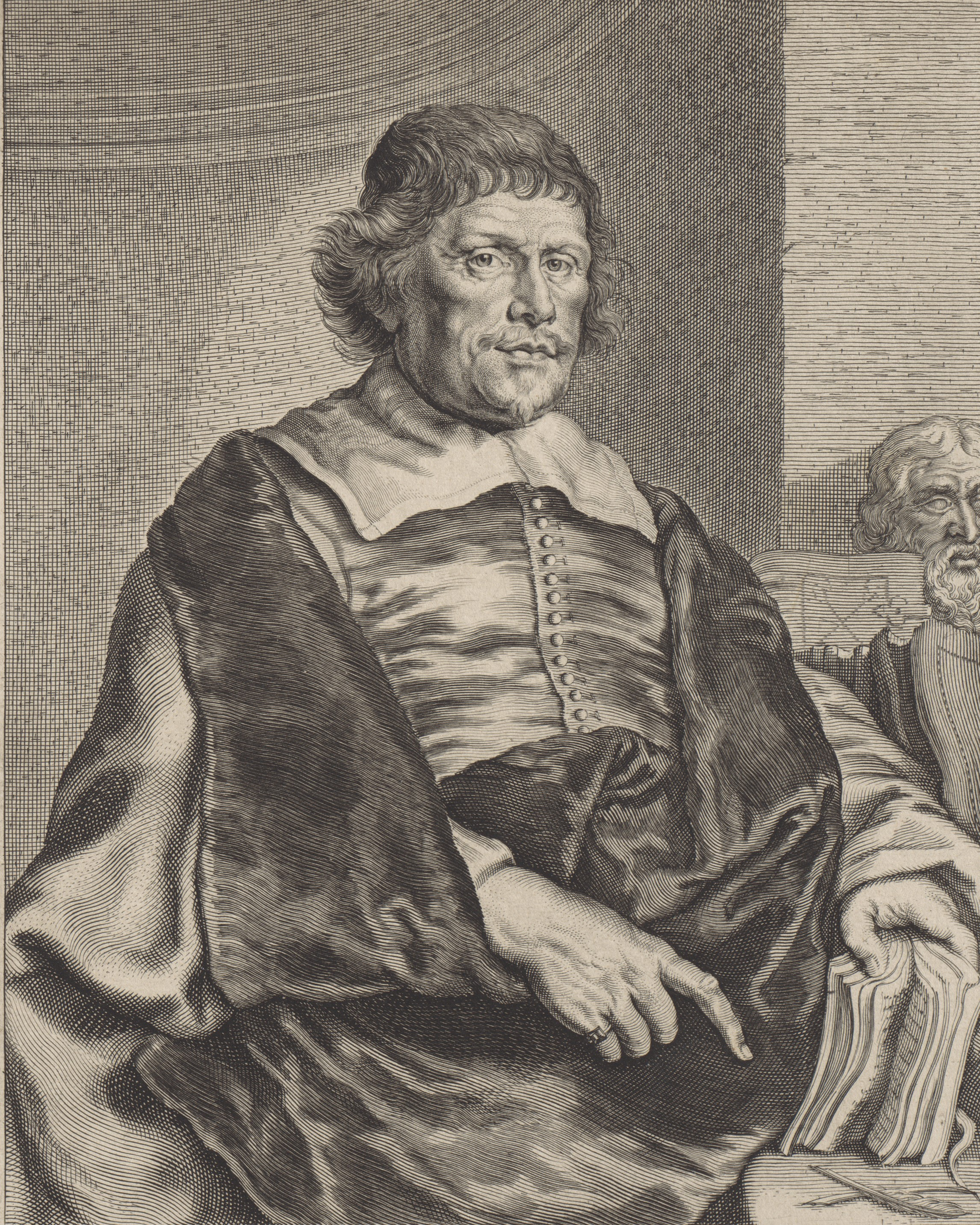
Caspar Barlaeus

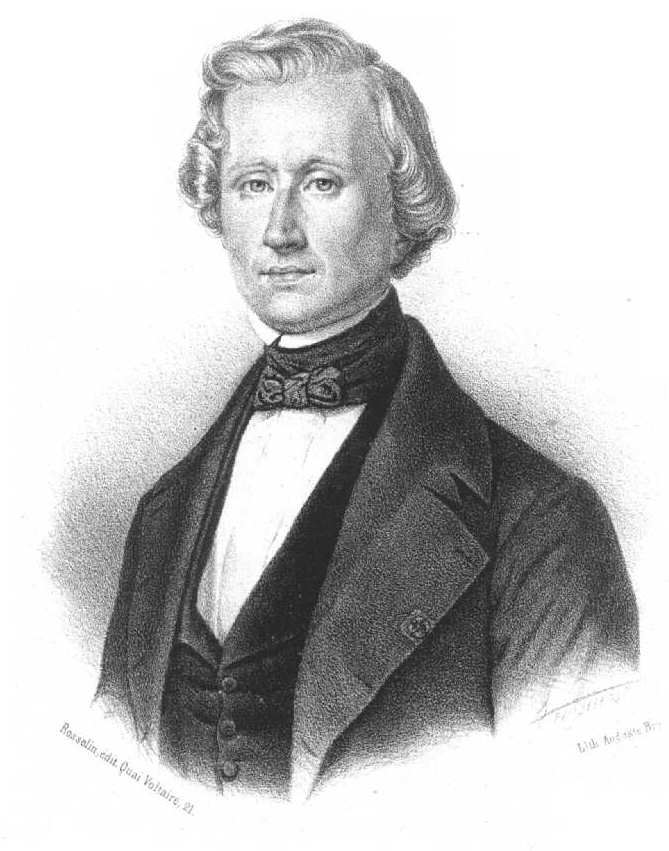
Urbain Le Verrier

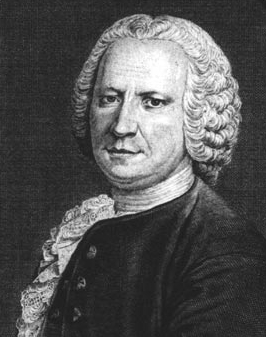
Guillaume-François Rouelle

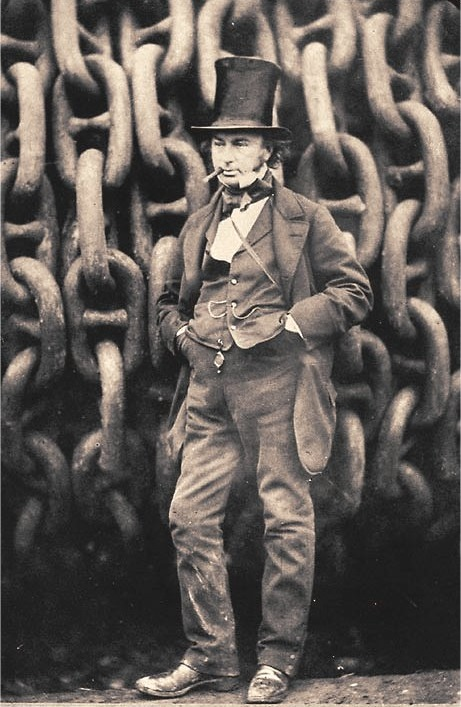
Isambard Kingdom Brunel

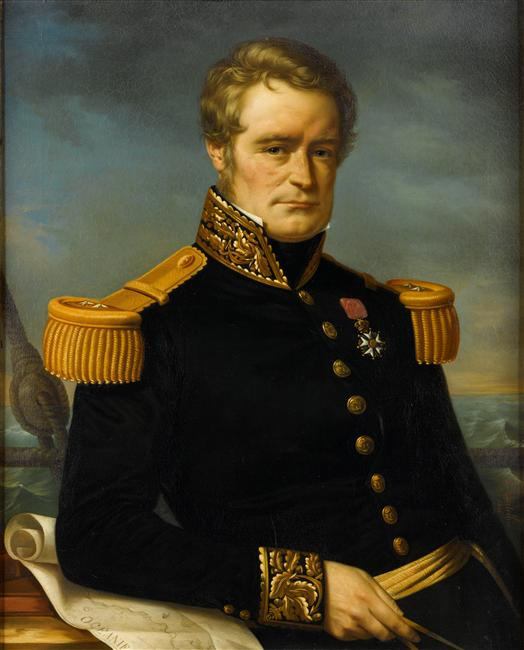
Jules Dumont d'Urville

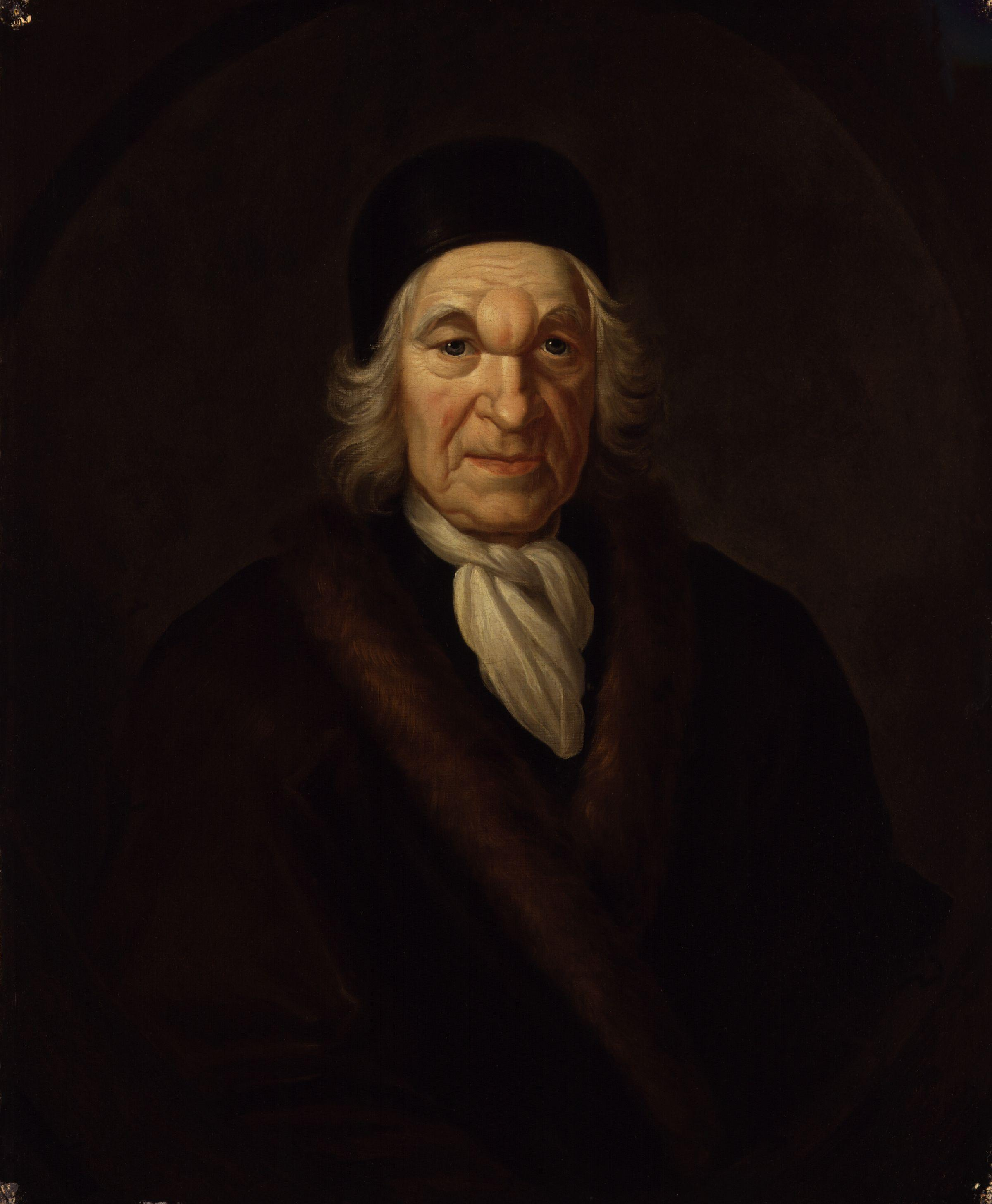
Charles de Saint-Évremond

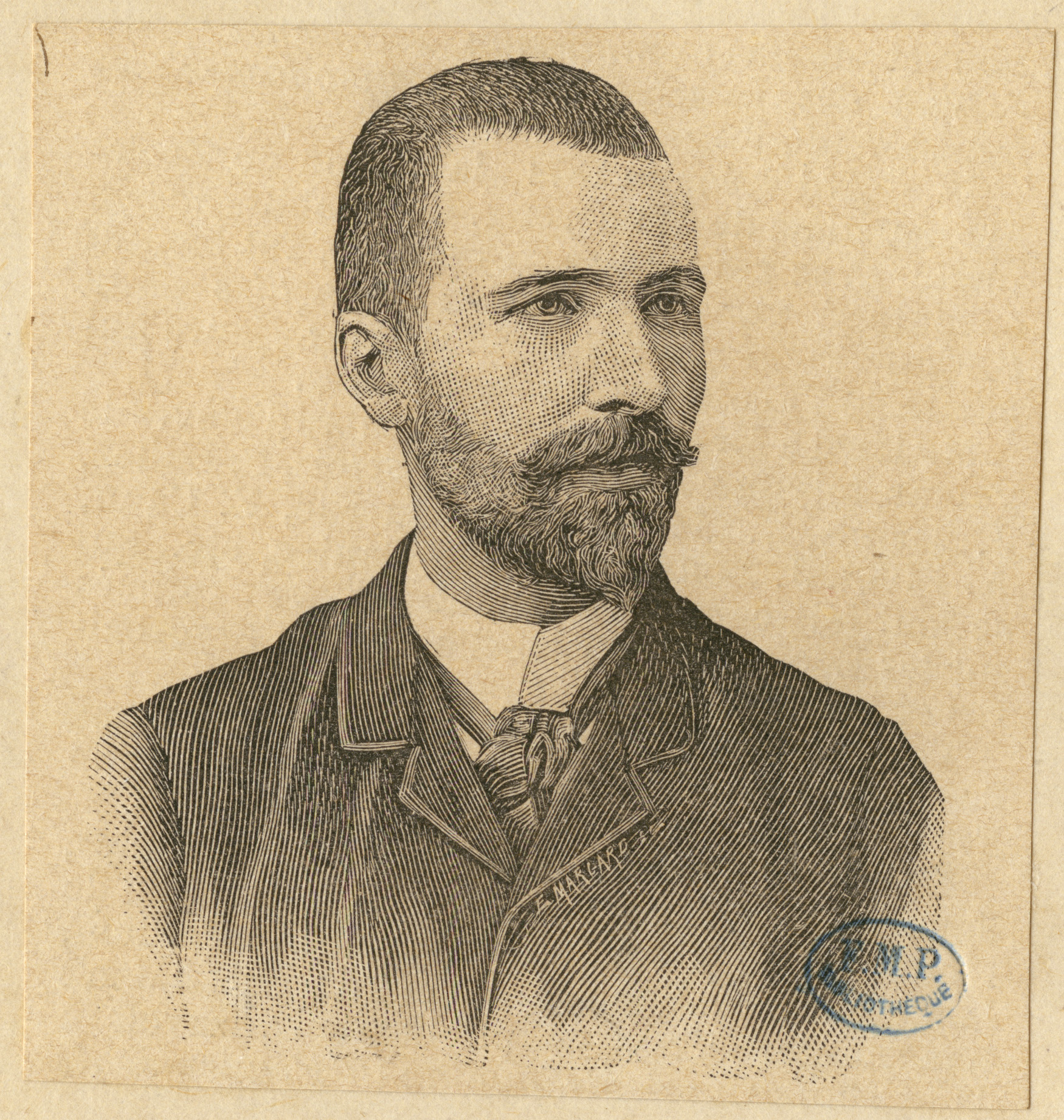
Pierre Augustin Dangeard

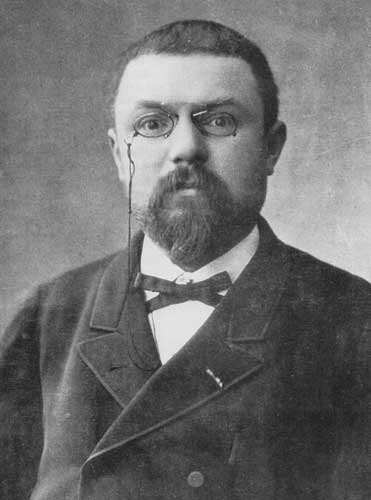
Henri Poincaré

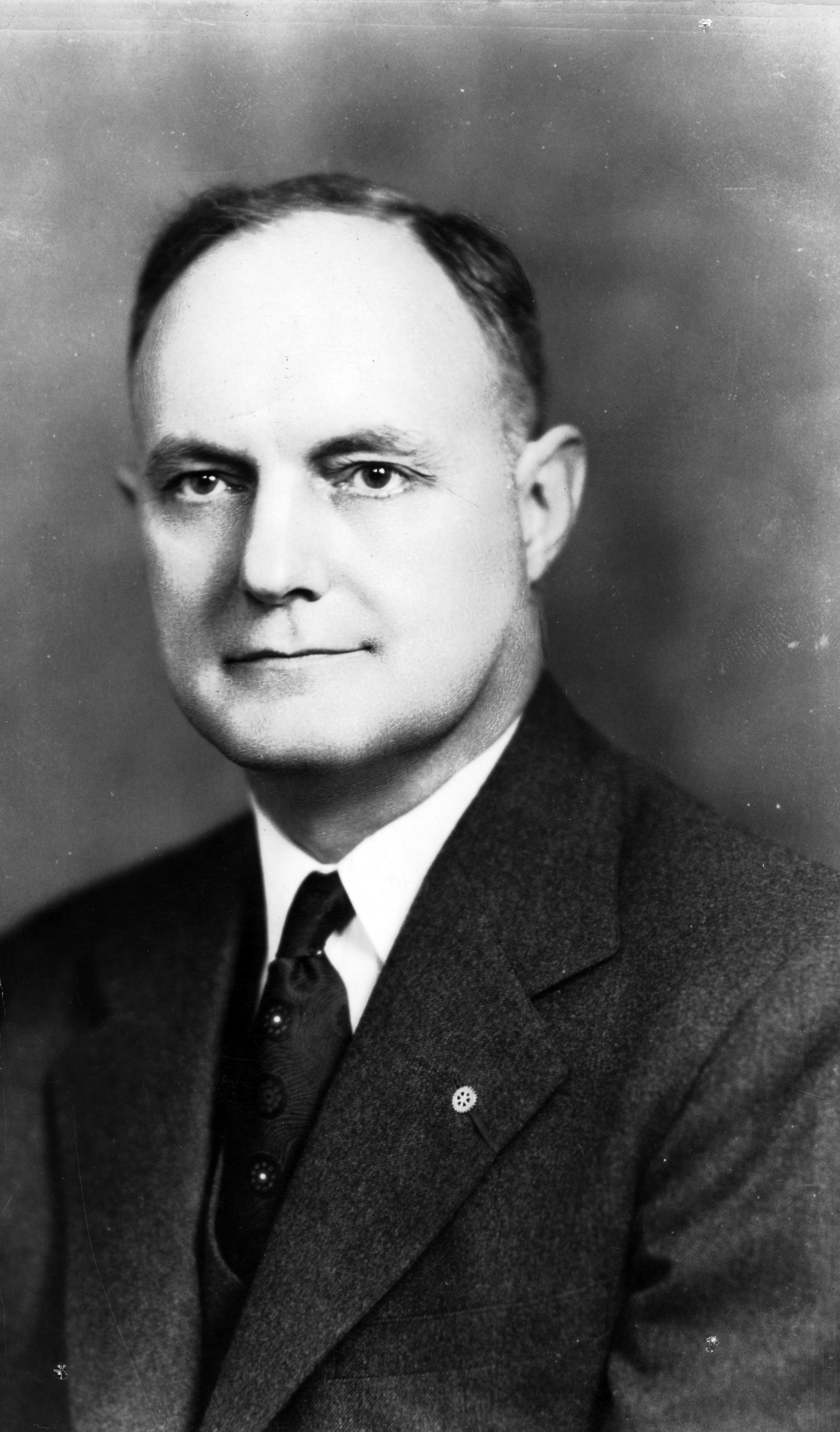
Blake Ragsdale Van Leer

=== Notable faculty ===
- Gaston Mialaret (1918 - 2016), French pedagogist and university professor
- Doris Bensimon (1924–2009), Austrian-born French sociologist and academic
- Albert Gabriel (1883–1972), French associate professor of Art history (1923–1925)

== Miscellaneous ==
- The mathematician Pierre Varignon, whose work would influence the young Leonhard Euler, earned his M.A. from Caen in 1682.
- Pierre-Simon Laplace (1749–1827) was introduced to mathematics in Caen by Christophe Gadbled and Pierre Le Canu.
- Henri Poincaré (1854–1912) taught there between 1879 and 1881.
- The university aligned with École nationale supérieure d'ingénieurs de Caen and French National Centre for Scientific Research to form the Information, Image, Automatic and Instrumentation Research Group of Caen, which is known for the G'MIC open source image processing framework.
- The university contains a famous scale model of Rome.
- Those intending to become advocates or solicitors in Guernsey (or, until recently, Jersey) must complete three months' study of Norman law at Caen University (Certificat d'Études Juridiques Françaises et Normandes) prior to being called to the Guernsey or Jersey Bar, respectively.
- The Carré international is located here. The center is a hub for exchange students from around the world who wish to attend university in France. They take students from A1 (no French experience) to C2 (Native language).
- The university takes part in the XL-Chem Graduate School of Research project, funded by the State via the National Research Agency.
- Thomas Campion physician, poet, and composer of lute songs received his medical degree in 1605.

== See also ==
- List of medieval universities
- List of universities and colleges in France
