= January 30 (Eastern Orthodox liturgics) =

Day in the Eastern Orthodox liturgical calendar

Eastern Orthodox liturgical calendar
January 29	January 30	January 31
January 30 O.S. ≍ February 12 N.S. January 30 N.S ≍ January 17 O.S.

An Eastern Orthodox cross

January 30 in Eastern Orthodox liturgical calendars is a feast day and a day of commemoration of saints and martyrs. Although some Orthodox churches use the Revised Julian Calendar and others use the traditional Julian calendar, the fixed commemorations for their respective January 30 are broadly the same, no matter which calendar is used. (Note: Despite the dates being the same, the days to which they refer typically differ by 13 days. The notation Old Style or O.S. is sometimes used to indicate a date in the traditional Julian Calendar (the "Old Calendar"). The notation New Style or N.S, indicates a date in the Revised Julian calendar (the "New Calendar").)

== Feasts ==
- Synaxis of the Three Holy Hierarchs:

- Saint Basil the Great, Saint Gregory the Theologian, and Saint John Chrysostom.

== Saints ==
- Hieromartyr Hippolytus, priest, of Antioch, martyred in the period of the heretical Novatianists. (Note: "At Antioch, the passion of the blessed priest Hippolytus, who, for a short time deceived by the Novatian schismatics, was converted by the grace of Christ and returned to the unity of the Church, for which and in which he afterwards underwent a glorious martyrdom. Being asked by the schismatics which was the better side, he repudiated the doctrine of Novatus, and affirming that the faith ought to be professed which the Chair of Peter taught, he presented his neck to the executioners.")
- Hieromartyr Hippolytus of Rome, Bishop of Rome, and those with him:

- Martyrs Censorinus, Sabinus, Ares (Aares), the virgin Chryse (Chryse of Rome), Felix, Maximus, Herculianus, Venerius, Styracius, Mennas, Commodus, Hermes, Maurus, Eusebius, Rusticus, Monagrius, Amandinus, Olympius, Cyprus, Theodore the Tribune, the priest Maximus, the deacon Archelaus, and the bishop Cyriacus, at Ostia, – under Roman Emperor Claudius Gothicus and a vicarius named Ulpius Romulus (269) (Note: "HIPPOLYTUS (St.) M. (Jan. 30). A Syrian Christian, a priest, converted from the errors of Novatus and afterwards put to death for the Faith at Antioch, some time subsequent to a.d. 250.") (see also August 13 - Hippolytus of Rome - who may or may not be the same individual)

- Venerable Zeno the Hermit, of Antioch (414), disciple of St. Basil the Great.
- Martyr Theophilus the New, in Cyprus (784)
- Venerable Kyriakos, ascetic of the Great Lavra of St. Sabbas the Sanctified (7th-8th centuries)
- Saint Peter I of Bulgaria, King of Bulgaria (969)

== Pre-Schism Western saints ==
- Saint Matthias of Jerusalem, bishops of Jerusalem, confessor (120)
- Saint Martina of Rome, a martyr in Rome under Alexander Severus (228)
- Saint Savina of Milan (Sabina), born in Milan, she ministered to martyrs in prison and buried their bodies during the persecution of Diocletian (311)
- Saint Armentarius of Antibes, first Bishop of Antibes in Provence in France (ca. 451) (Note: An old church is dedicated to him in Draguignan.)
- Martyrs Felician, Philippian and Companions, a group of one hundred and twenty-six martyrs in North Africa.
- Saint Tudy (Tudclyd, Tybie), a virgin in Wales; St Tybie's church in Llandybie in Dyfed is named after her (5th century)
- Saint Adelgonda (Adelgunda), foundress of Maubeuge Abbey (680) (Note: Sister of St Waldetrudis, Abbess of Mons in Belgium. She founded the convent of Maubeuge in the north of France.)
- Saint Balthildes (Bathilda), Queen of France (680) (Note: Born in England, she was sold as a slave to the mayor of the palace of the Kingdom of Neustria. In 649 King Clovis II married her and she became the mother of three future kings. After her husband's death, she was regent of France (656-664). When Clotaire III came of age, she became a nun at the convent of Chelles which she had founded.)
- Saint Armentarius of Pavia, Bishop of Pavia (ca. 711)
- Saint Amnichad (Amnuchad), a monk and then a hermit at Fulda monastery (1043)

== Post-Schism Orthodox saints ==
- Venerable Zeno the Faster, of the Kiev Caves Monastery (14th century) (Note: See: (in Russian): Зинон Постник. Википедии. (Russian Wikipedia).)
- New Martyr Hadji Theodore of Mytilene (Mt. Athos) (1784)
- New Martyr Demetrius of Sliven (1841)
- Saint Theophil, fool-for-Christ, of Svyatogorsk Monastery (1868)
- Blessed Pelagia of Diveyevo Monastery, Fool-for-Christ (1884) (Note: See: (in Russian): Пелагия Дивеевская. Википедии. (Russian Wikipedia).)

=== New martyrs and confessors ===
- New Hieromartyr Vladimir Ioannovich Khrishchenovich (Kristenovich), Priest (1933)
- New Martyr Stephen Pimenovich Nalivayko (1945) (Note: See: (in Russian): Наливайко, Стефан Пименович. Википедии. (Russian Wikipedia).)

== Other commemorations ==
- Finding of the Wonderworking Icon of Panagia Evangelistria of Tinos (1823) (see also: December 18)
- Commemoration of the deliverance of the island of Zakynthos from the plague by Saint George the Great-Martyr (1688)

== Icon gallery ==
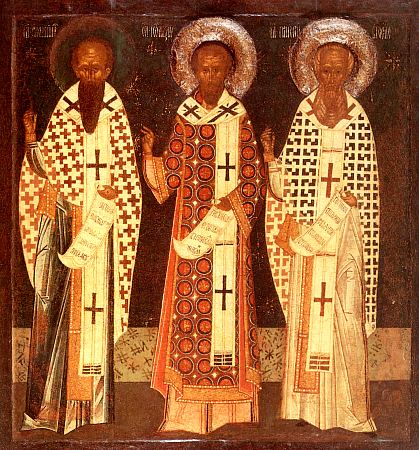
Synaxis of the Three Holy Hierarchs.

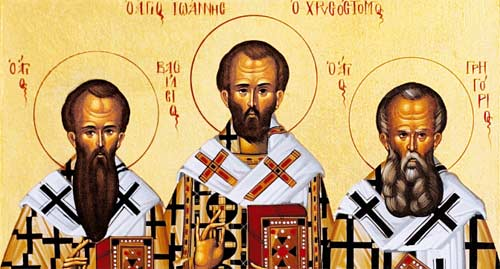
Synaxis of the Three Holy Hierarchs.

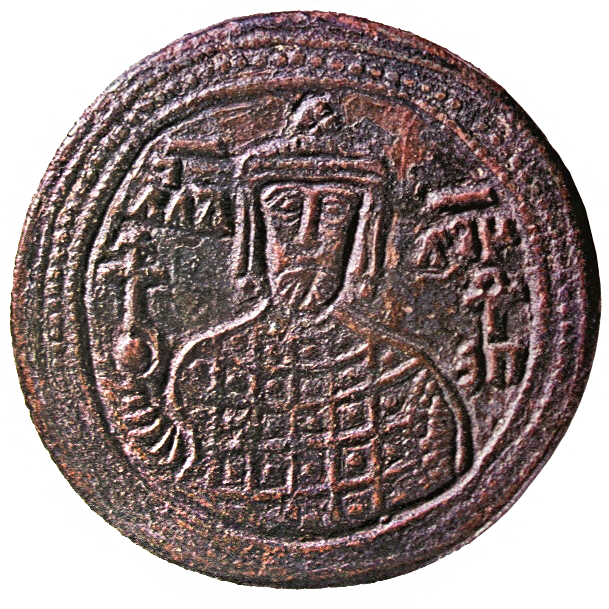
Seal of Bulgarian tsar Peter I.

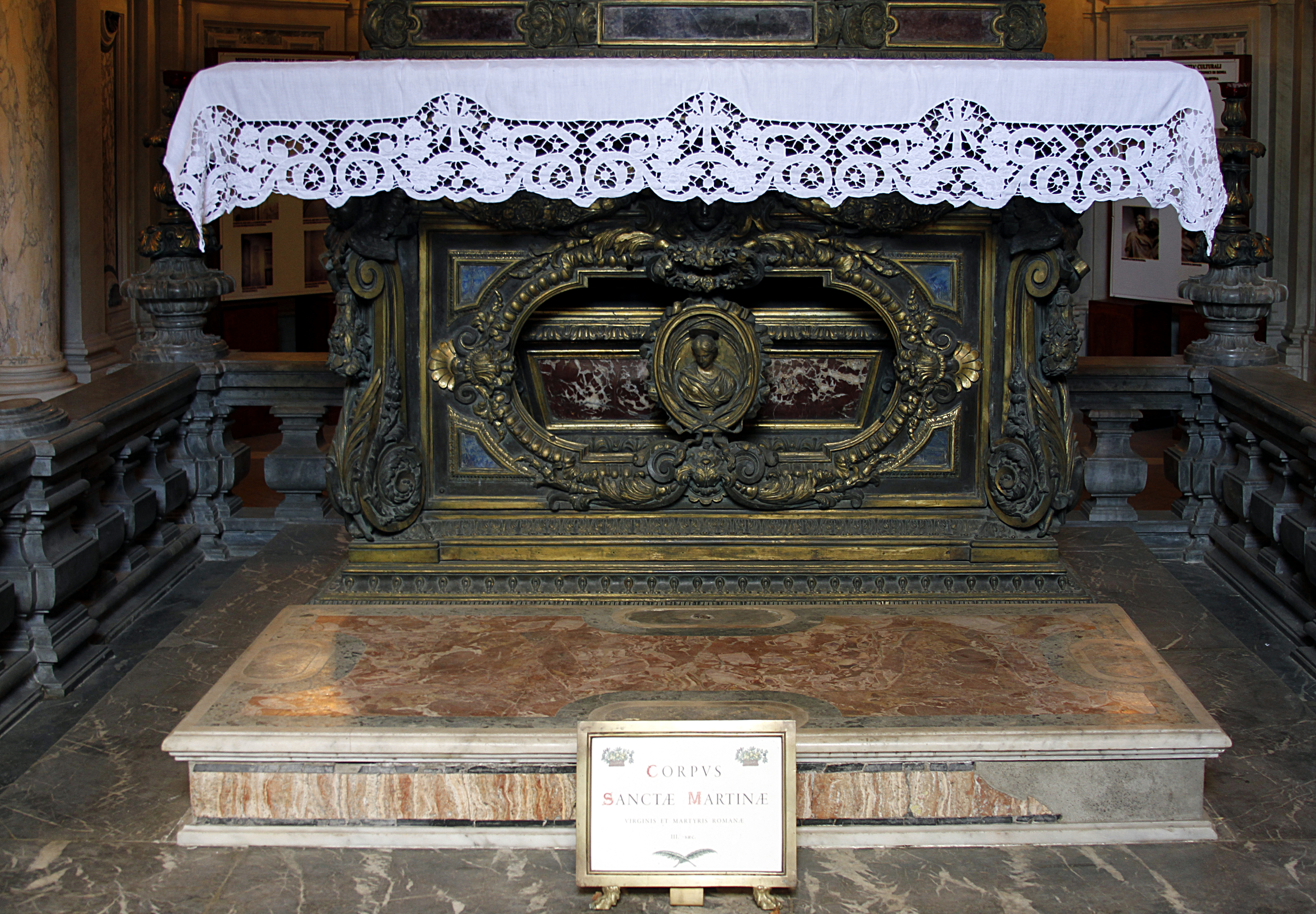
Tomb of Saint Martina of Rome.

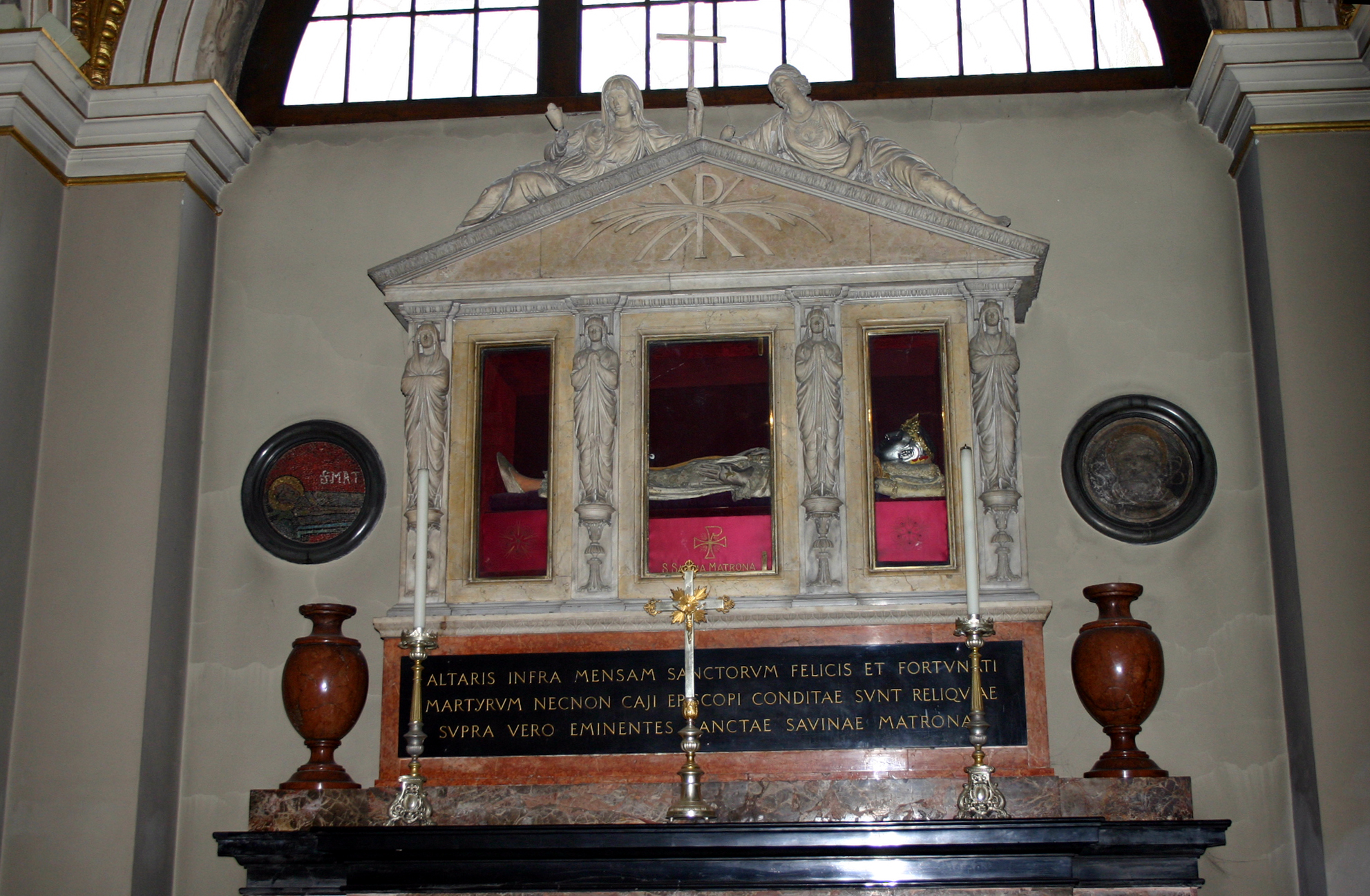
Relics of St. Savina of Milan, in Milan, Italy.

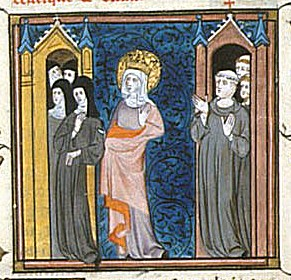
A mediaeval depiction of St. Balthildes, Queen of France.

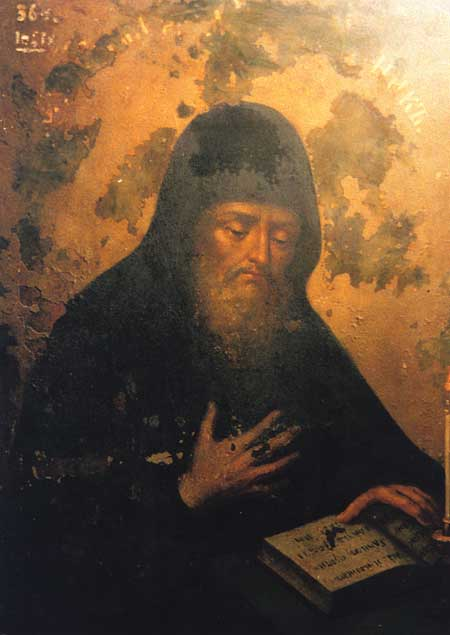
St. Zeno the Faster, of the Kiev Caves Monastery.

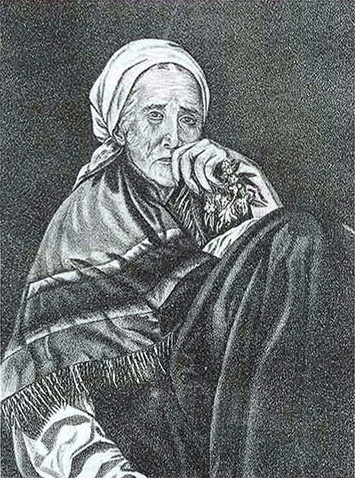
Blessed Pelagia of Diveyevo Monastery, Fool-for-Christ.

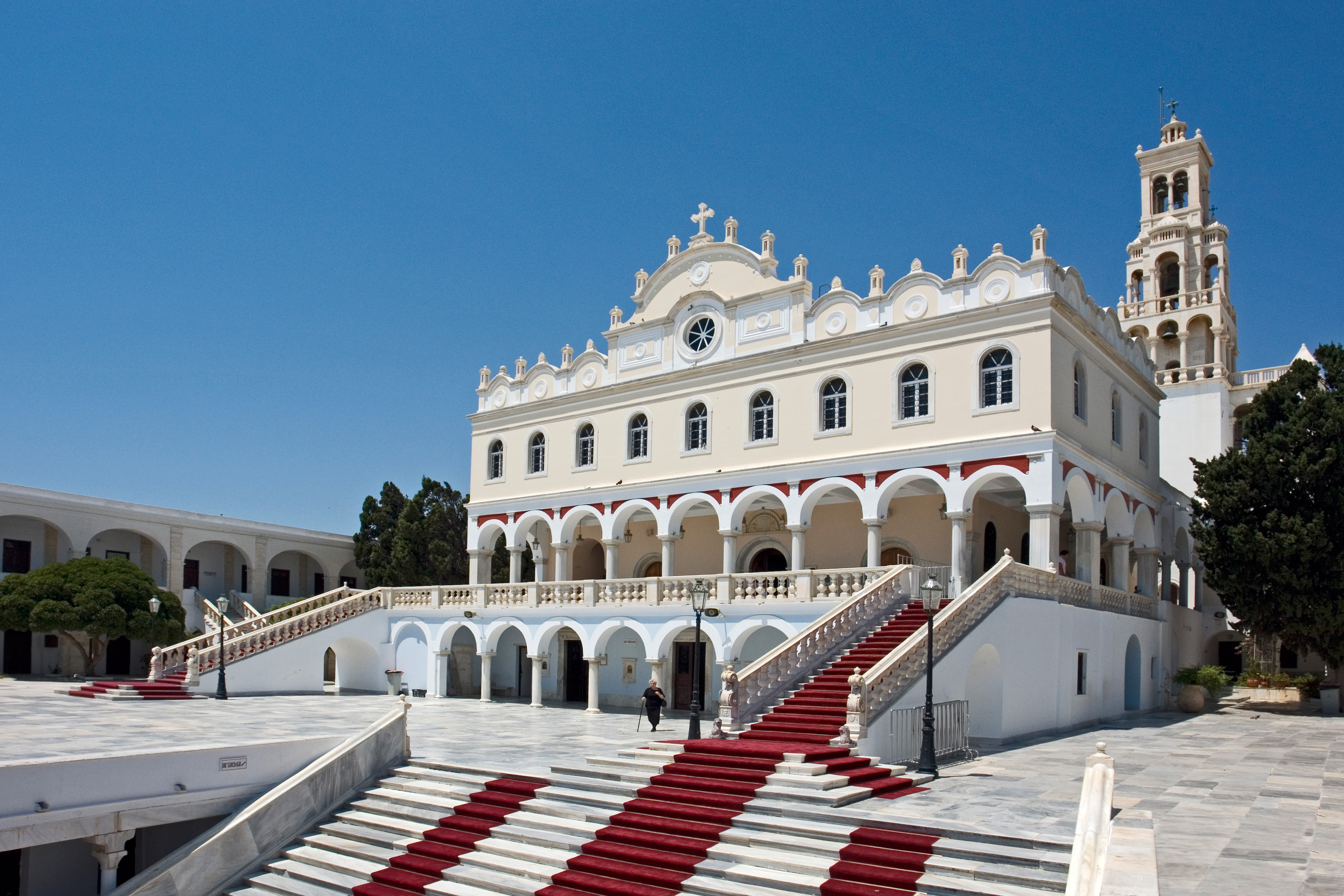
Shrine of Panagía Evangelístria of Tinos.

== Sources ==
- January 30 / February 12. Orthodox Calendar (PRAVOSLAVIE.RU).
- February 12 / January 30. HOLY TRINITY RUSSIAN ORTHODOX CHURCH (A parish of the Patriarchate of Moscow).
- January 30. OCA - The Lives of the Saints.
- The Autonomous Orthodox Metropolia of Western Europe and the Americas (ROCOR). St. Hilarion Calendar of Saints for the year of our Lord 2004. St. Hilarion Press (Austin, TX). p. 11.
- January 30. Latin Saints of the Orthodox Patriarchate of Rome.
- The Roman Martyrology. Transl. by the Archbishop of Baltimore. Last Edition, According to the Copy Printed at Rome in 1914. Revised Edition, with the Imprimatur of His Eminence Cardinal Gibbons. Baltimore: John Murphy Company, 1916. pp. 30–32.
- Rev. Richard Stanton. A Menology of England and Wales, or, Brief Memorials of the Ancient British and English Saints Arranged According to the Calendar, Together with the Martyrs of the 16th and 17th Centuries. London: Burns & Oates, 1892. pp. 40–41.

Greek Sources

- Great Synaxaristes: (in Greek) 30 ΙΑΝΟΥΑΡΙΟΥ. ΜΕΓΑΣ ΣΥΝΑΞΑΡΙΣΤΗΣ.
- (in Greek) Συναξαριστής. 30 Ιανουαρίου. ECCLESIA.GR. (H ΕΚΚΛΗΣΙΑ ΤΗΣ ΕΛΛΑΔΟΣ).

Russian Sources

- (in Russian) 12 февраля (30 января). Православная Энциклопедия под редакцией Патриарха Московского и всея Руси Кирилла (электронная версия). (Orthodox Encyclopedia - Pravenc.ru).
- (in Russian) 30 января (ст.ст.) 12 февраля 2013 (нов. ст.). Русская Православная Церковь Отдел внешних церковных связей. (DECR).
