= January 17 (Eastern Orthodox liturgics) =

Day in the Eastern Orthodox liturgical calendar

Eastern Orthodox liturgical calendar
January 16	January 17	January 18
January 17 O.S. ≍ January 30 N.S. January 17 N.S ≍ January 4 O.S.

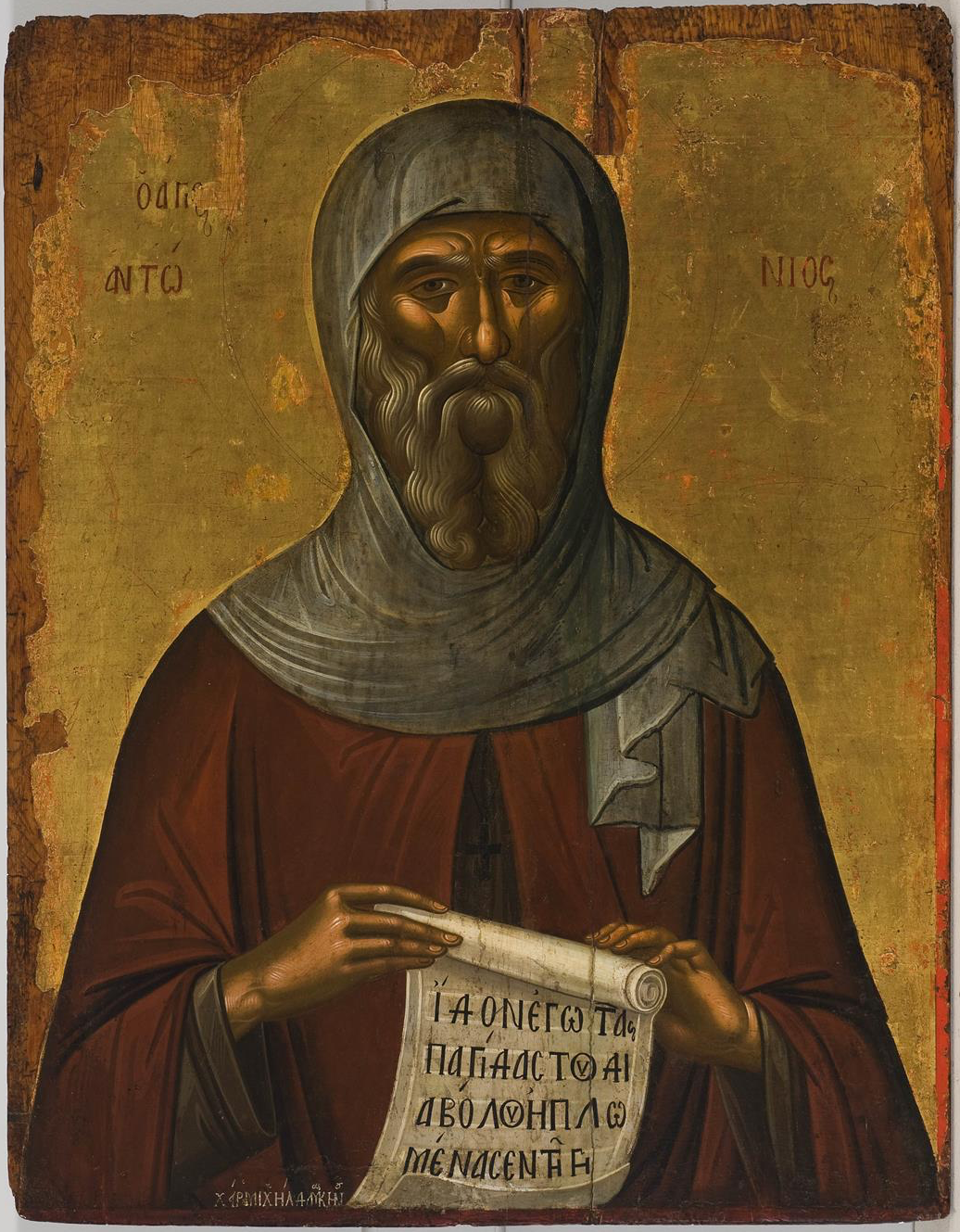
Anthony the Great, God-bearing father of monasticism. (Michael Damaskinos, 16th century).

January 17 in Eastern Orthodox liturgical calendars is a feast day and a day of commemoration of saints and martyrs. Although some Orthodox churches use the Revised Julian Calendar and others use the traditional Julian calendar, the fixed commemorations for their respective January 17 are broadly the same, no matter which calendar is used. (Note: Despite the dates being the same, the days to which they refer typically differ by 13 days. The notation Old Style or O.S. is sometimes used to indicate a date in the traditional Julian Calendar (the "Old Calendar"). The notation New Style or N.S, indicates a date in the Revised Julian calendar (the "New Calendar").)

== Saints ==
- Venerable Anthony the Great, God-bearing father of monasticism (356) (Note: "IN Thebais, St. Anthony, abbot and spiritual guide of many monks. He was most celebrated for his life and miracles, of which St. Athanasius has written a detailed account. His sacred body was found by divine revelation, during the reign of the emperor Justinian, and brought to Alexandria, where it was buried in the church of St. John the Baptist.") (Note: Name days celebrated today include: Anthony, Antonios, Andonis, Tony (Ἀντώνιος); Antonia, Tonia, Tanya (Ἀντωνία).)
- Martyr Jonilla and her infant son Turbo (c. 161-180) (see also: January 16)
- Saint Theodosius I the Great, Roman Emperor (395)
- Venerable Achilles the Confessor, Hermit of Egypt (5th century)

== Pre-Schism Western saints ==
- Saints Genulfus (Genou) and Genitus, two monks who lived in Celle-sur-Nahon in France (c. 3rd century)
- Venerable Antony, Merulus and John, three monks at St. Andrew's on the Coelian Hill in Rome (6th century) (Note: St. Gregory the Great, who was their Abbot, has left an account of their virtues and miraculous power.)
- Saint Nennius (Ninnidh), disciple of Saint Finian of Clonard, reckoned as one of the 'Twelve Apostles of Ireland' (6th century)
- Saint Sulpicius II (Sulpitius II) the Pious (Severus the Pious), Bishop of Bourges (644, 646, or 647) (Note: "At Bourges, the demise of St. Sulpicius, surnamed Pius, whose life and precious death are adorned with glorious miracles.")
- Saint Mildgyth of Minster-in-Thanet, a Benedictine nun and later abbess of a Northumbrian convent (c. 676) (Note: The youngest of the three holy virgins of Minster-in-Thanet in England - Milburgh, Mildred and Mildgyth.) (Note: "ST. MlLDGYTH was the youngest of the three saintly daughters of Merewald and St. Ermenburga. When her mother returned to Kent, it is probable that Mildgyth accompanied her, as she must then have been of a tender age, and that she remained with her at Minster for some time. Like her sisters, St. Milburga and St. Mildred, she was favoured with a vocation to the religious life, and the place chosen for her retreat was some monastery in the kingdom of Northumbria, the name of which is not known. The ancient record merely says: St. Milgith lies in Northumbria, where her miraculous powers were often exhibited, and still are.")
- Saint Richimirus (Ric-Mar, Rigomer), under the patronage of the Bishop of Le Mans, he founded the monastery later called Saint-Rigomer-des-Bois (715)
- Saint Joseph of Verona, Bishop of Freising (764) (Note: A monk who in 752 founded the monastery of St. Zeno at Isen. In 764 he became third Bishop of Freising in Germany. His relics are in Isen.)

== Post-Schism Orthodox saints ==
- Venerable Anthony the New Wonderworker of Beroea (Beroia, Veria), Macedonia, Greece, near the Haliacmon river (11th century)
- Saint Anthony the Roman of Novgorod, Abbot (1147)
- Venerable Anthony, Founder of Dymsk Monastery, Novgorod (1224) (Note: See: (in Russian) Антоний Дымский. Википедии. (Russian Wikipedia).)
- Saint Anthony, Archbishop of Novgorod (1232)
- Saint Anthony, Founder of Krasny Kholm Monastery, Krasnokholmsky District, Tver Oblast (1481) (Note: See: (in Russian) Антоний Краснохолмский. Википедии. (Russian Wikipedia).)
- Venerable Anthony of Meteora (Anthony Kantakouzènos), founder and Abbot of the Monastery of St. Stephen at Meteora (15th century) (Note: Venerable Anthony Cantacuzène was the son of Maria Kantakouzene (the daughter of Emperor John VI Kantakouzenos), who married Nikephoros II Orsini the Despot of Epirus.)
- Venerable Anthony, Founder of Chernoezersk (Chernoezero, Chermoezersk) (Black Lake) Monastery, Novgorod (1598)
- Venerable Philotheos of Meteora, second founder of the Monastery of St. Stephen at Meteora (16th century)
- Saint Macarius Kalogeras, Hierodeacon of Patmos (1737)
- Saint Herman Gomzin, Schema-abbot of Zosima Hermitage (1923)

=== New martyrs and confessors ===
- New Martyr George of Ioannina (1838)
- New Hieromartyr Victor Evropeytsev, Priest (1931)
- New Hieromartyr Paul Uspensky, Priest (1938)

== Other commemorations ==
- Repose of Saint Anthony, Bishop of Vologda (1588) (feast day: October 26)
- Repose of Archimandrite Tikhon Bogoslovtsev of Inkerman (1950)
- Repose of Bishop Sava Saračević of Edmonton (1973)

== Icon gallery ==
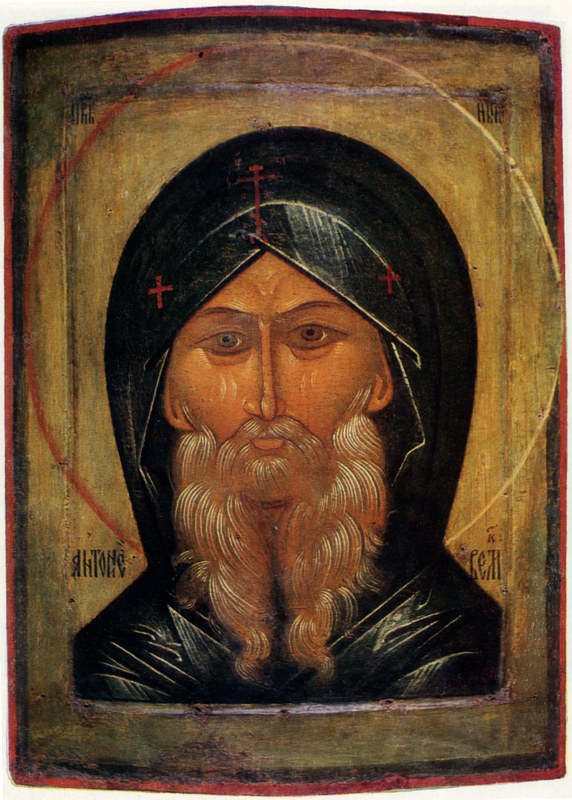
Venerable Anthony the Great
(16th-century icon).

Repose of Venerable Anthony the Great.
(Menologion of Basil II, 10th century).

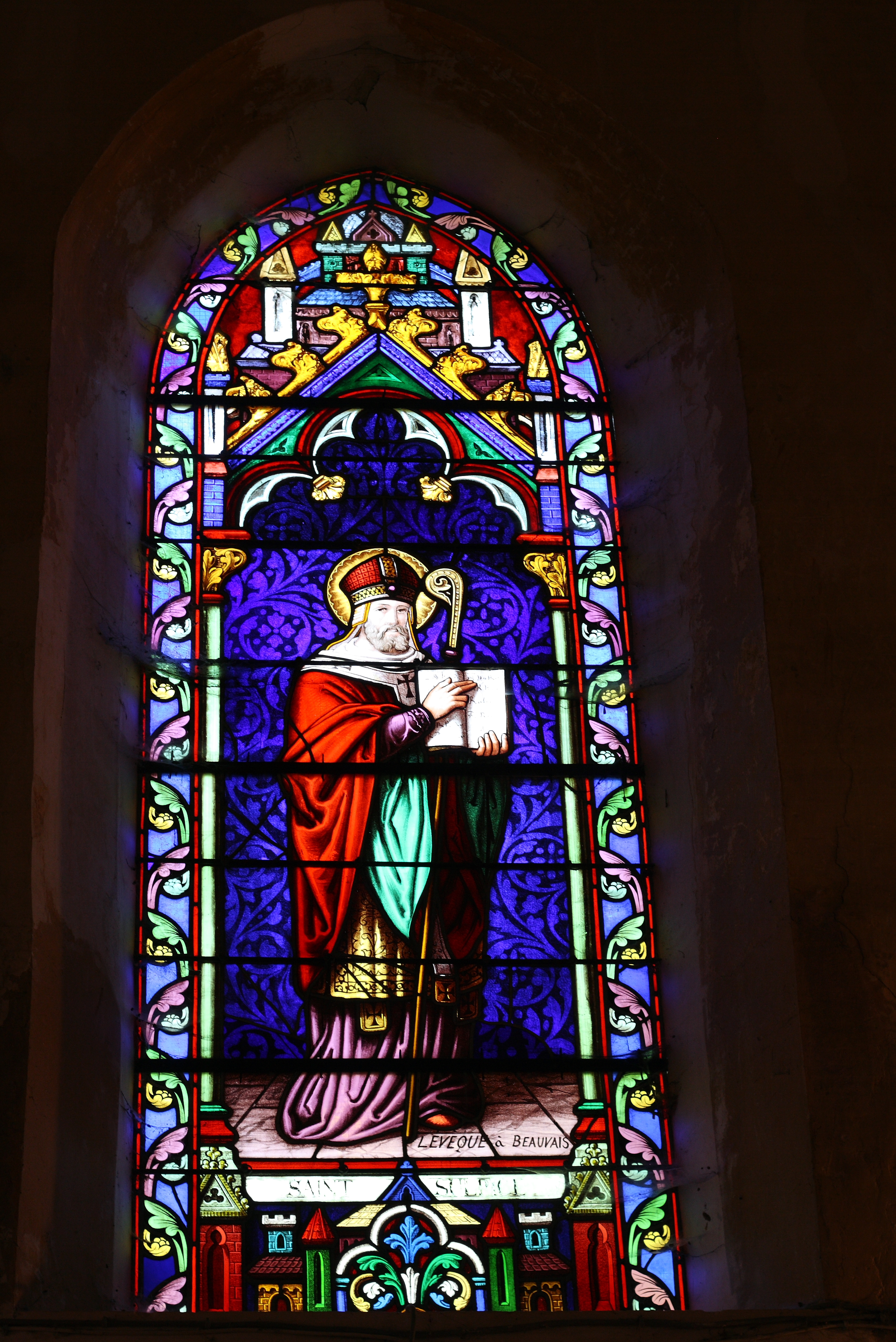
Saint Sulpicius II Pius, Bishop of Bourges.

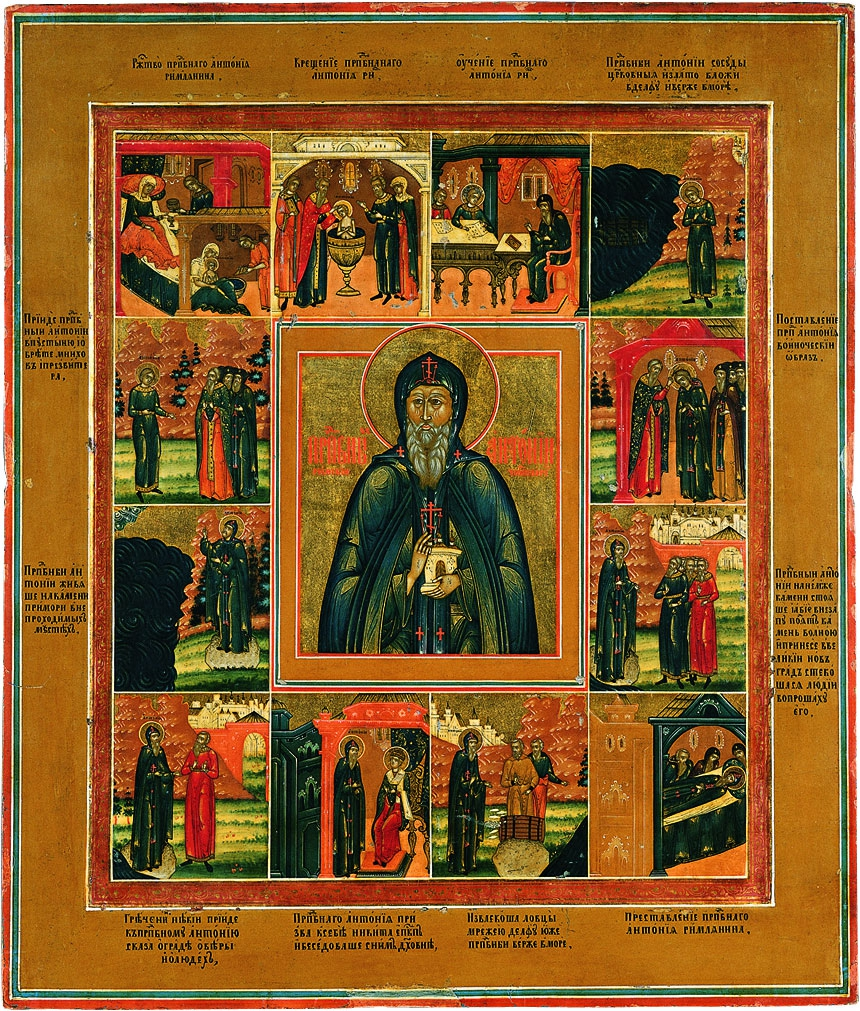
St. Anthony the Roman of Novgorod, Abbot.

St. Anthony, Founder of Krasny Kholm Monastery.

St. Herman Gomzin, Schema-abbot of Zosima Hermitage.

== Sources ==
- January 17/January 30. Orthodox Calendar (PRAVOSLAVIE.RU).
- January 30 / January 17. HOLY TRINITY RUSSIAN ORTHODOX CHURCH (A parish of the Patriarchate of Moscow).
- January 17. OCA - The Lives of the Saints.
- The Autonomous Orthodox Metropolia of Western Europe and the Americas (ROCOR). St. Hilarion Calendar of Saints for the year of our Lord 2004. St. Hilarion Press (Austin, TX). p. 8.
- January 17. Latin Saints of the Orthodox Patriarchate of Rome.
- The Roman Martyrology. Transl. by the Archbishop of Baltimore. Last Edition, According to the Copy Printed at Rome in 1914. Revised Edition, with the Imprimatur of His Eminence Cardinal Gibbons. Baltimore: John Murphy Company, 1916. pp. 17–18.

Greek Sources

- Great Synaxaristes: (in Greek) 17 ΙΑΝΟΥΑΡΙΟΥ. ΜΕΓΑΣ ΣΥΝΑΞΑΡΙΣΤΗΣ.
- (in Greek) Συναξαριστής. 17 Ιανουαρίου. ECCLESIA.GR. (H ΕΚΚΛΗΣΙΑ ΤΗΣ ΕΛΛΑΔΟΣ).

Russian Sources

- (in Russian) 30 января (17 января). Православная Энциклопедия под редакцией Патриарха Московского и всея Руси Кирилла (электронная версия). (Orthodox Encyclopedia - Pravenc.ru).
- (in Russian) 17 января (ст.ст.) 30 января 2014 (нов. ст.). Русская Православная Церковь Отдел внешних церковных связей. (DECR).
