= Savina of Milan =

Early Christian martyr (died 311)

Saint Savina of Milan
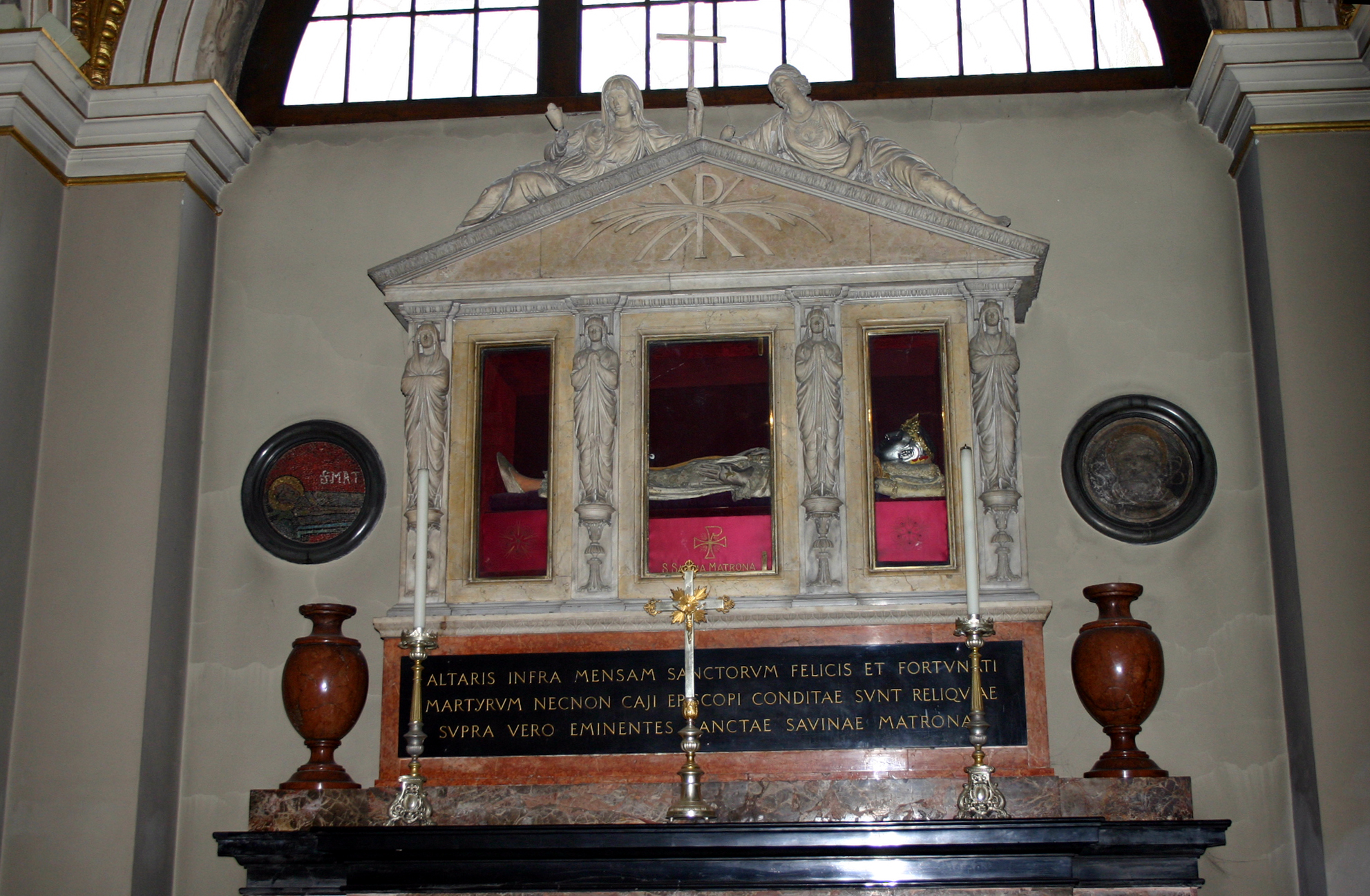
- Right-side nave of the Basilica of Sant'Ambrogio in Milan. Savina's grave is above the altar in Santa Savina chapel (rebuilt in 1868 to house her relics).

Martyr
- Born: 3rd century
- Died: AD 311; Milan
- Venerated in: Eastern Orthodox Church; Roman Catholic Church
- Major shrine: Basilica of Sant'Ambrogio
- Feast: 30 January
- Attributes: robes

Savina of Milan (Italian: Savina di Milano; died 311) was a Milanese Christian martyr who was killed during the Diocletianic Persecution. She is venerated as a saint in the Eastern Orthodox Church and Roman Catholic Church, being commemorated on 30 January.

She gave aid to Christian prisoners and also ensured that they received proper burials after their executions, and for this reason she was martyred. Holy tradition states that she died while praying at the tomb of Saints Nabor and Felix.

== Legacy ==
There is a church and town square in Victoria, Gozo named after her.
