= Gaston Mialaret =

French pedagogist and psychologist

Gaston Mialaret (10 October 1918, Paris - 30 January 2016, Garches) was a French educator, pedagogist and professor at the University of Caen. He contributed to the establishment of educational sciences at the university from 1967.

== Biography ==
Mialaret studied at the normal school in Cahors, where he obtained the higher certificate and passed the baccalaureate. He began his professional life as a teacher in Figeac in 1939, while also pursuing studies in mathematics at the University of Toulouse. Following his demobilization, he became a mathematics teacher at the high school in Albi, where he was entrusted with organizing the new classes based on the approach introduced by Gustave Monod. In 1946, he underwent training as an inspector at the École Normale Supérieure de Saint-Cloud, attained a psychology license at the Sorbonne, and subsequently secured a position as an assistant at Saint-Cloud. Here, he established the first psychopedagogy laboratory in 1948. Additionally, he served as a lecturer at the Institute of Psychology in Paris. In 1957, he defended his thesis on the teaching of mathematics and another dedicated to the training of mathematics teachers.

In 1953, he was recruited to the University of Caen to expand the teaching of psychology by creating a curriculum and a degree program. He held the position of chief of staff, later becoming a university professor until 1984. In 1956, he establishes a psychopedagogy laboratory, and in 1967, his psychology chair was transformed into a "chair of educational sciences" following the inception of this discipline at the university. Alongside Maurice Debesse, a professor at the Sorbonne, and Jean Château, a psychology professor at the University of Bordeaux, he became an advocate for introducing this discipline at the university. Through their collective influence, education sciences were institutionalized in 1969 as the 70th section of the Consultative Committee of Universities, eventually evolving into the National Council of Universities in 1987.

== Publications ==
- Psychopédagogie des moyens audiovisuels dans l'enseignement du premier degré, Paris, PUF, 1964
- Éducation nouvelle et monde moderne, Paris, PUF, 1966
- L'apprentissage de la lecture, Paris, PUF, 1966
- L'apprentissage des mathématiques, Bruxelles, Dessart, 1967
- Les méthodes de recherche en sciences de l'éducation, Paris, PUF, « Que sais-je ? », No. 3699, 2004.
- Introduction aux sciences de l’éducation, Delachaux et Niestlé, UNESCO, 1985
- Pédagogie générale, Paris, PUF, 1991
- (co-direction) Histoire mondiale de l'éducation, avec Jean Vial, Paris, PUF, 1981, 4 volumes.
- Les sciences de l’éducation, Paris, PUF, « Que sais-je ? » No. 1645, 11edition, 2011.
- La psychopédagogie, Paris, PUF, « Que sais-je ? », No. 2357, 5édition, 2002.
- Psychologie de l'éducation, Paris, PUF, « Que sais-je ? », No. 3475, 3édition, 2011.
- Le Plan Langevin-Wallon, Paris, PUF, 1997
- Propos impertinents sur l’éducation actuelle, Paris, PUF, 2003
- Sciences de l’éducation : aspects historiques, problèmes épistémologiques, Paris, PUF, coll. «Quadrige», 2006
- Le nouvel esprit scientifique et les sciences de l'éducation, Paris, PUF, 2011
- Pour la recherche et la formation, Paris: L'Harmattan, 2013

== See also ==
- Pedagogy
- Education in France
