= Martina of Rome =

Italian Roman Catholic saint

Saint Martina of Rome
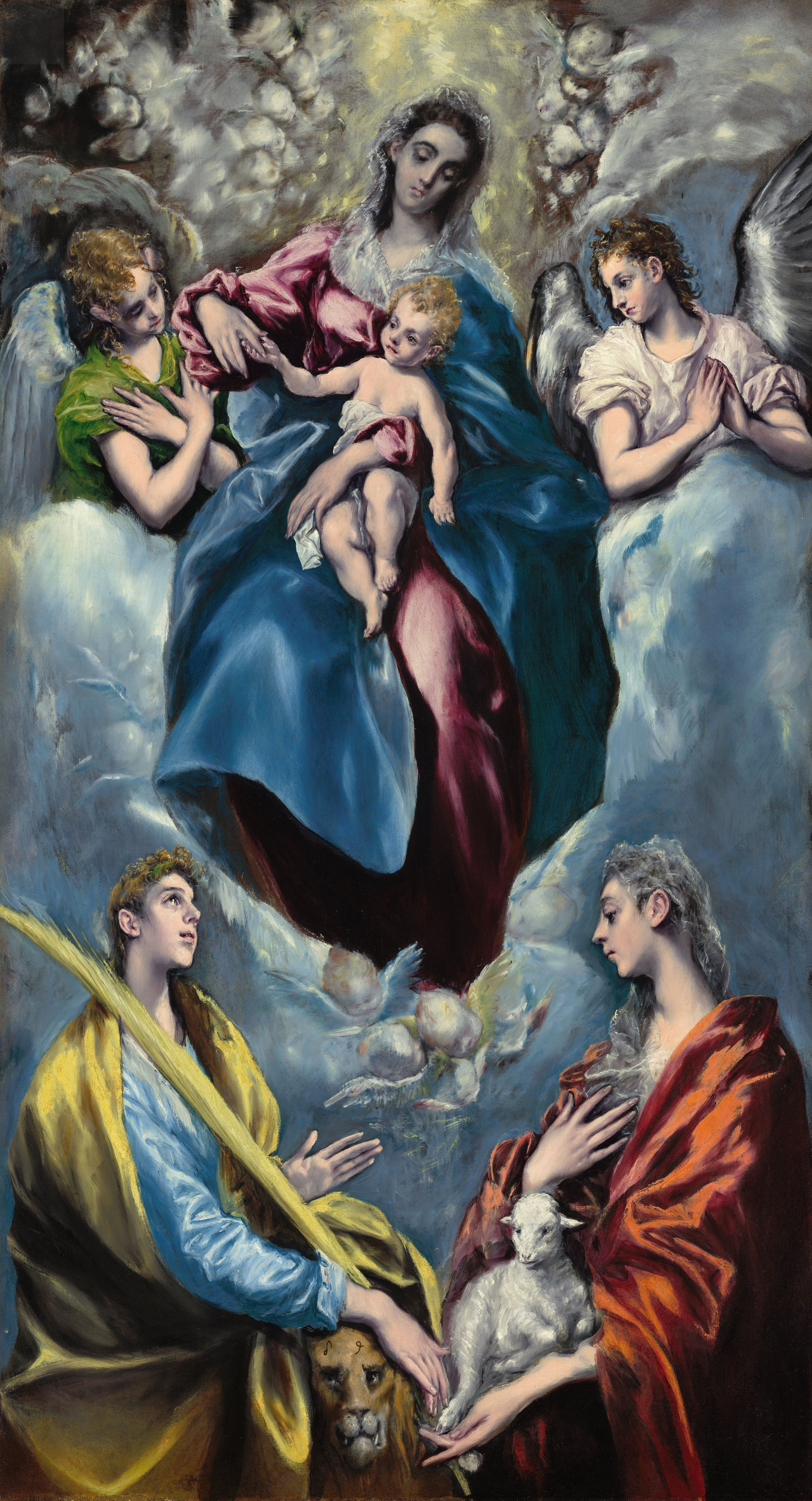
- Virgin Mary with Ss. Agnes and Martina, El Greco

Virgin martyr
- Died: 228; Rome
- Venerated in: Roman Catholic Church; Eastern Orthodox Church
- Major shrine: Santi Luca e Martina
- Feast: 30 January
- Attributes: palm of martyrdom
- Patronage: Rome; nursing mothers

Martina of Rome, a Christian virgin, was martyred in 226 (according to some authorities, more probably in 228) under the pontificate of Pope Urban I, according to others. Her feast day is 30 January. She is one of the patron saints of Rome.

== Biography ==
Martina was described as a noble and beautiful virgin, the daughter of an ex-consul and orphaned at an early age. She so openly testified to her Christian faith that she could not escape the persecutions under Severus Alexander. Arrested and commanded to return to idolatry, she refused, whereupon she was subjected to various tortures and was finally beheaded.

These tortures, according to Martina's vita, include being scourged. She was condemned to be devoured by wild beasts in the amphitheater but was miraculously untouched by them. She was then thrown onto a burning pyre, from which she also escaped unhurt, and was finally beheaded. Her hagiography asserts that some of her executioners also converted to Christianity and were themselves beheaded.

== Veneration ==
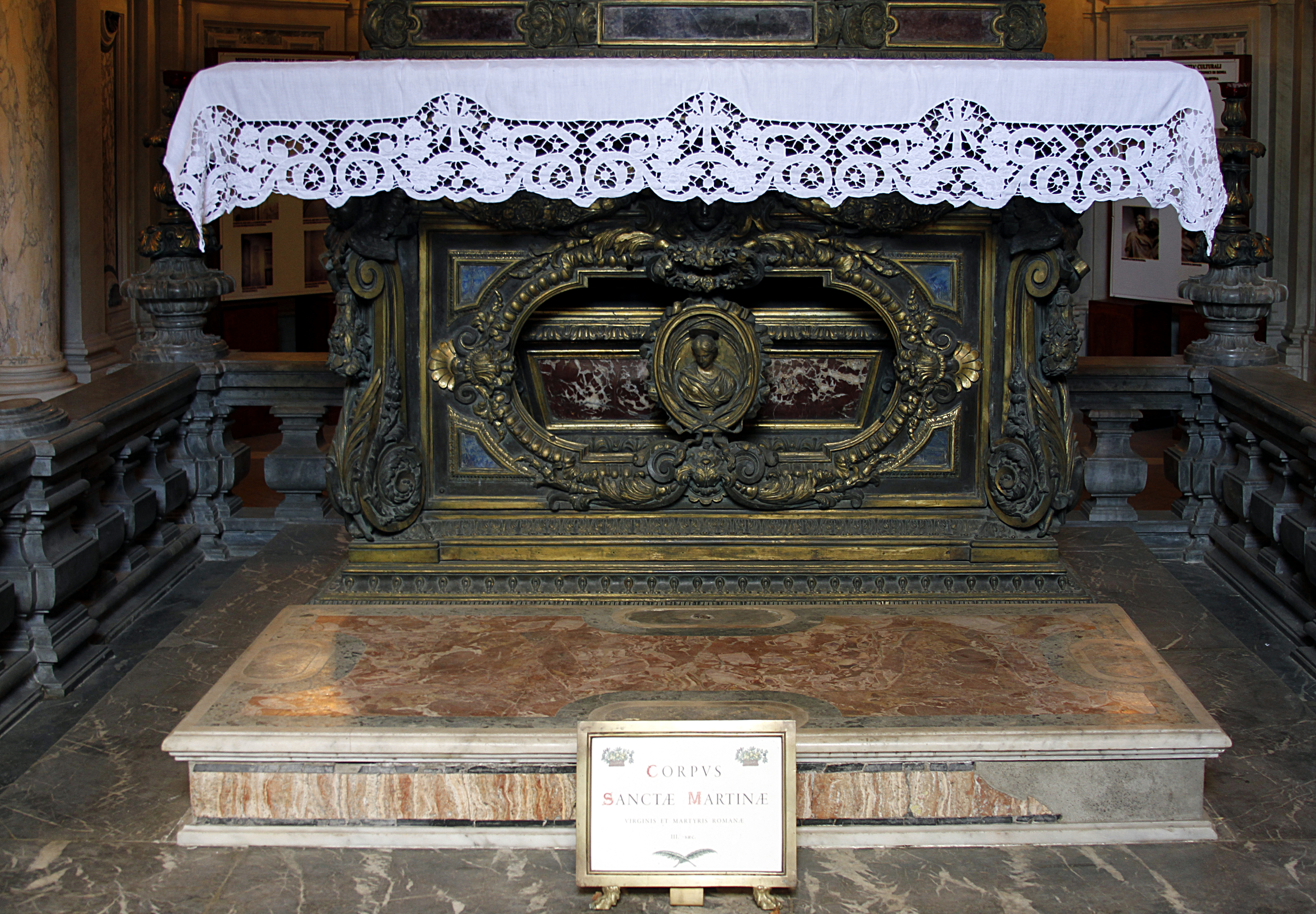
Tomb of Saint Martina

Ostia, at the mouth of the Tiber, was the scene of her martyrdom; but her body was transported to Rome, where a church near the Mamertine Prison, Santi Luca e Martina, was later dedicated in her honour.

On October 25, 1634, during restoration of the crypt, as was common at this time in Rome, buried remains were found by the painter Pietro da Cortona, president of the Accademia di San Luca, and were attributed to the martyred Saint Martina. No doubt it was hoped that this would precipitate an influx of funds to shelter the relics in a new church. Pope Urban VIII, who occupied the Holy See at that time, had the church repaired and, it would seem, composed the hymns which are sung at her office.
