= January 31 (Eastern Orthodox liturgics) =

Day in the Eastern Orthodox liturgical calendar

Eastern Orthodox liturgical calendar
January 30	January 31	February 1
January 31 O.S. ≍ February 13 N.S. January 31 N.S ≍ January 18 O.S.

An Eastern Orthodox cross

January 31 in Eastern Orthodox liturgical calendars is a feast day and a day of commemoration of saints and martyrs. Although some Orthodox churches use the Revised Julian Calendar and others use the traditional Julian calendar, the fixed commemorations for their respective January 31 are broadly the same, no matter which calendar is used. (Note: Despite the dates being the same, the days to which they refer typically differ by 13 days. The notation Old Style or O.S. is sometimes used to indicate a date in the traditional Julian Calendar (the "Old Calendar"). The notation New Style or N.S, indicates a date in the Revised Julian calendar (the "New Calendar").)

== Saints ==
- Martyr Tryphaena of Cyzicus (1st century)
- Martyrs Victorinus, Victor, Nicephorus, Claudius, Diodorus, Serapion, and Papias, at Corinth (251 or 258)
- Holy Wonderworkers and Unmercenaries Cyrus and John, and Martyrs Athanasia and her daughters Theoctista, Theodota, and Eudoxia, at Canopus in Egypt (311)
- Martyrs Saturninus, Thyrsus and Victor, at Alexandria.
- Martyrs Tharsicius, Zoticus, Cyriacus, and their companions, at Alexandaria.
- Saint Julius of Aegina (Julius of Novara), missionary priest to northern Italy (401) (Note: Julius was a priest and his brother Julian a deacon. Together they converted heathen temples into Christian churches.)
- Saint Athanasius, Bishop of Methone (ca. 880) (Note: Saint Athanasius was born in Catania in Sicily, during the invasion of the Saracens he fled to Patras in Greece, where he became a monk and eventually a bishop (ca. 885))

== Pre-Schism Western saints ==
- Saint Geminian of Modena, Deacon and later successor of the Bishop of Modena (348) (Note: He gave refuge to St Athanasius the Great when he came through Italy on his way to exile in Gaul. Geminian bravely opposed Jovinianism.)
- Saint Marcella of Rome (410) (Note: A noblewoman of Rome, as a widow she turned her home into a house-church and she devoted herself to prayer and almsgiving. When Alaric sacked Rome, Marcella was cruelly scourged as the Goths thought that she had hidden her wealth. In reality she had already distributed it to the poor. She died shortly after from the effects of this treatment.)
- Saint Madoes (Madianus), a saint who has left his name to a place in the Carse of Gowrie in Scotland.
- Saint Áedan (Maedoc), first Bishop of Ferns in Co. Wexford in Ireland, where he also founded and became abbot of a monastery (626) (Note: "MAEDOC, who is also called AIDUS or AIDAN, and in English Hugh, belonged to an illustrous family in Ireland. He was granted to the prayers of his parents, who had lived for a length of time without children. The early piety of Maedoc attracted attention, and even then a number of youths desired to place themselves under his guidance. To escape those tokens of respect, he fled from his own country and took refuge with St. David at his monastery in Wales. In that retreat he was trained in the practices of the religious life, and gave evidence of his sanctity by various miracles, which he performed. With the blessing of his holy master he returned to Ireland, founded several religious houses, and was consecrated Bishop of Ferns. It was in his episcopal See that he gave up his soul to God.")
- Saint Adamnan (Adomnán), born in Ireland, he became a monk at Coldingham Priory, now in Scotland (681)
- Saint Wilgils, father of St Willibrord, born in Northumbria in England, he settled on the banks of the River Humber and lived as a hermit (c. 700)
- Saint Bobinus, monk at Moutier-la-Celle. Later he became Bishop of Troyes (c. 766)
- Saint Ulphia (Wulfia, Olfe, Wulfe), hermitess near Amiens in France (8th century)
- Saint Eusebius, monk at St Gall in Switzerland and later lived as a hermit on Mount St Victor in the Vorarlberg (884) (Note: While denouncing godlessness, he was struck with a scythe and killed. As a result he was venerated as a martyr.)
- Saint John Angelus, born in Venice in Italy, he became a monk at Pomposa (c. 1050)

== Post-Schism Orthodox saints ==
- Venerable Nikita, recluse of the Kiev Caves, Bishop of Novgorod (1108)
- Venerable Pachomius, abbot of Keno Lake Monastery (1525) (Note: See: (in Russian) Пахомий Кенский. Википедии. (Russian Wikipedia).) (see also May 15)
- New Monk-martyr Elias (Ardunis) of Mount Athos and Kalamata (1686) (Note: Also celebrated on the 3rd Sunday of Pascha, the Sunday of the Myrrh-bearing Women.)
- Saint Arsenius the New, of Paros (1877)

== Other commemorations ==
- Synaxis of the Icon of the Most Holy Theotokos Koroniotissa or Dakryrroousis, at Lixouri, Cephalonia (1867)
- Repose of Eugene Poselyanin (Pogozhev), spiritual writer (1931)
- Repose of Elder Codratus (Condratus) of Karakalou monastery, Mount Athos (1940)
- Repose of Hieroschemamonk Stephen (Ignatenko) of Kislovodsk (1973) (Note: See: (in Russian): Стефан (Игнатенко). Википедии. (Russian Wikipedia).)
- Martyrdom of Paul (de Ballester-Convallier), Bishop of Nazianzus, in Mexico City (1984)

== Icon gallery ==
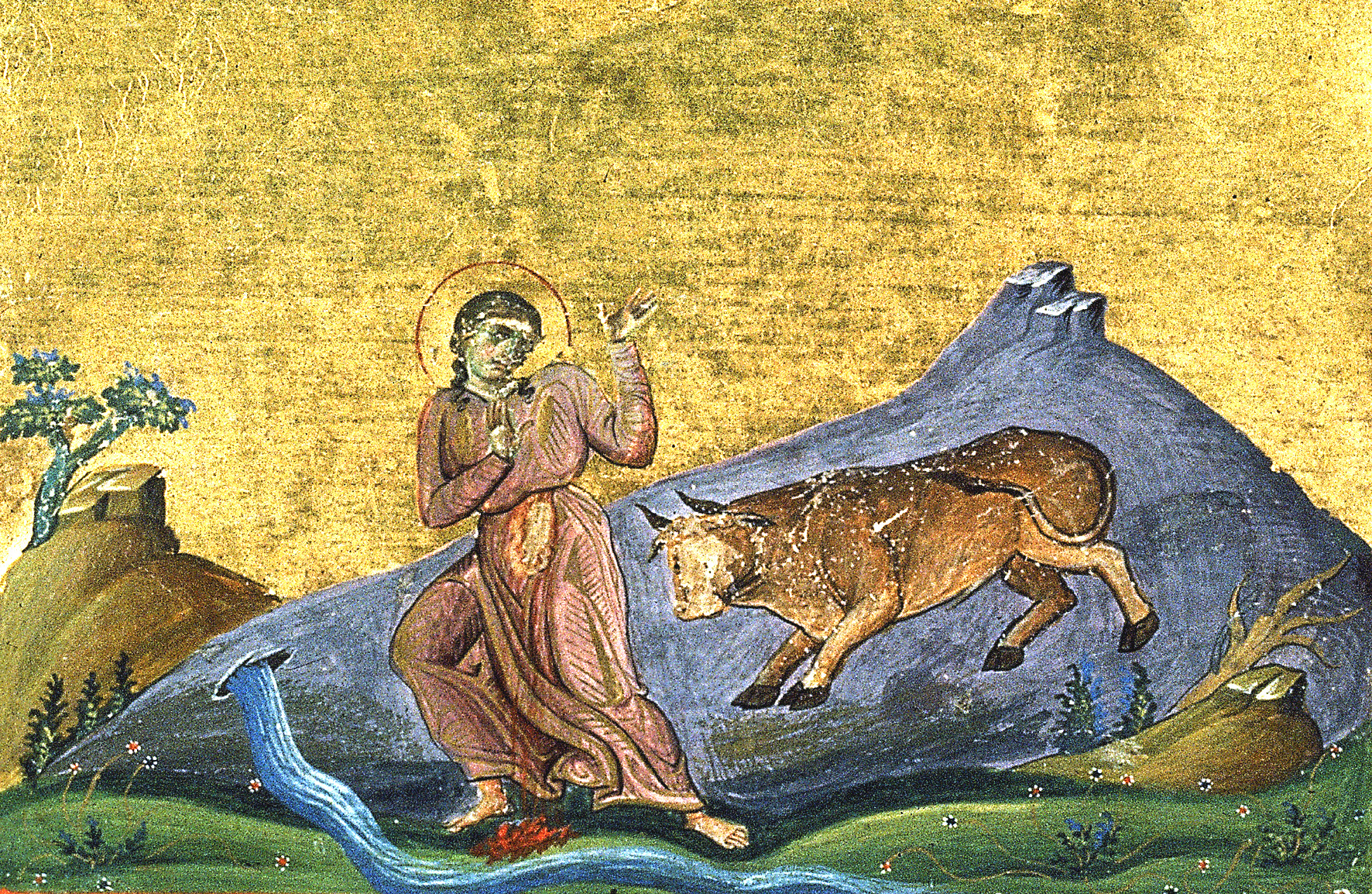
Martyr Tryphaena of Cyzicus.

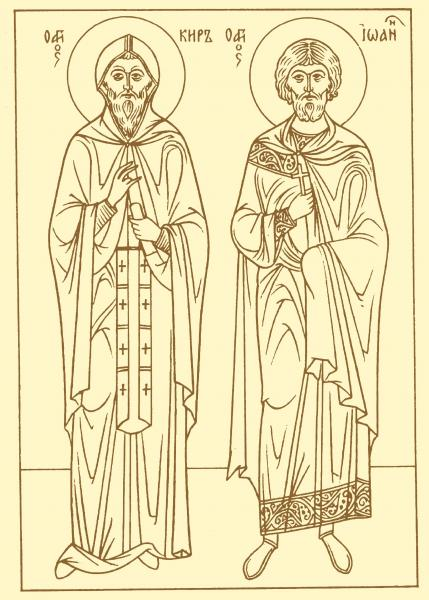
Holy Wonderworkers and Unmercenaries Cyrus and John.

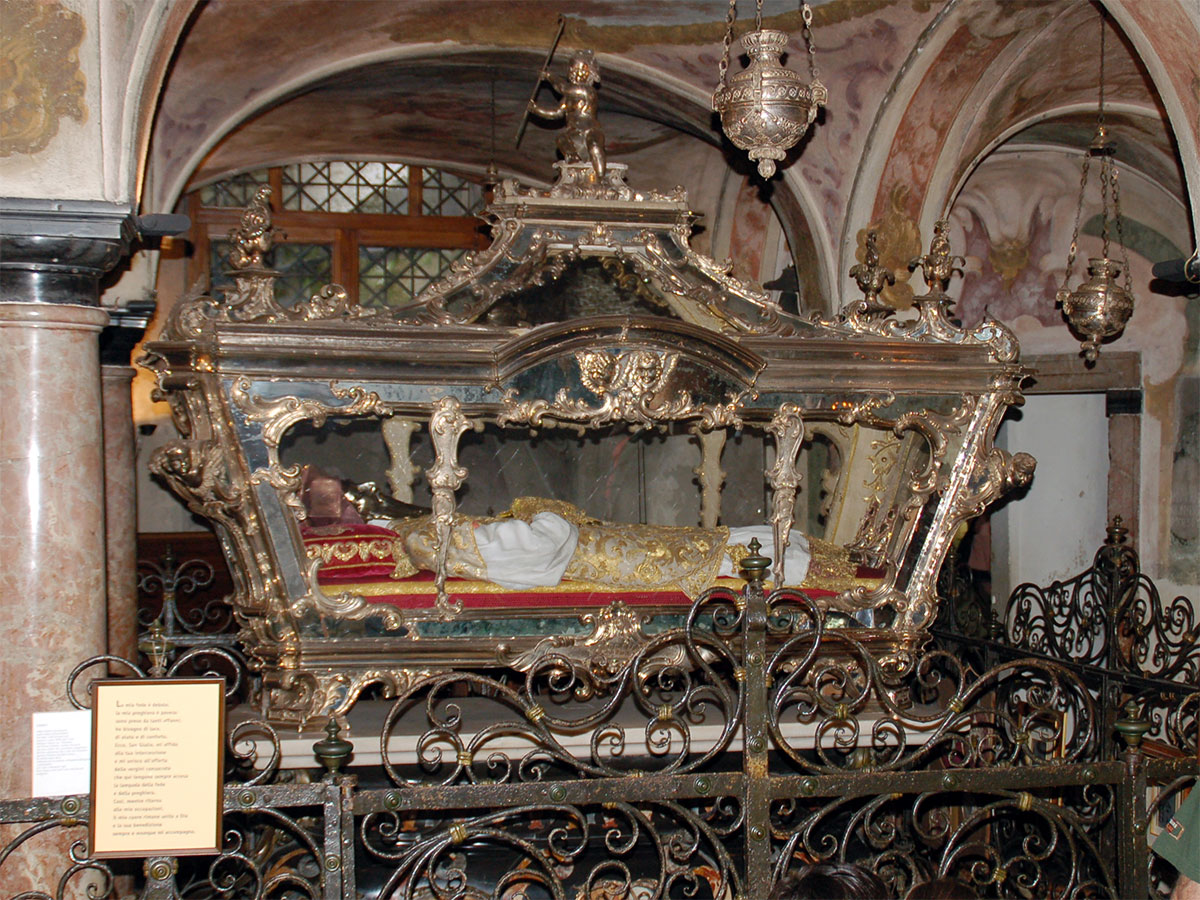
Relics of Saint Julius of Aegina (Julius of Novara).

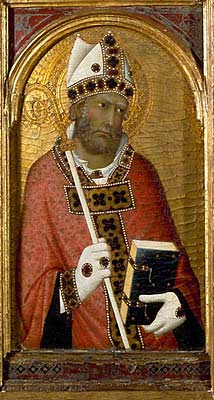
St. Saint Geminian of Modena.

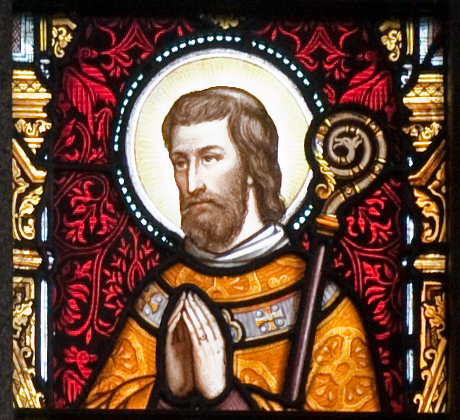
Saint Áedan (Maedoc), stained glass window in Enniscorthy Cathedral.

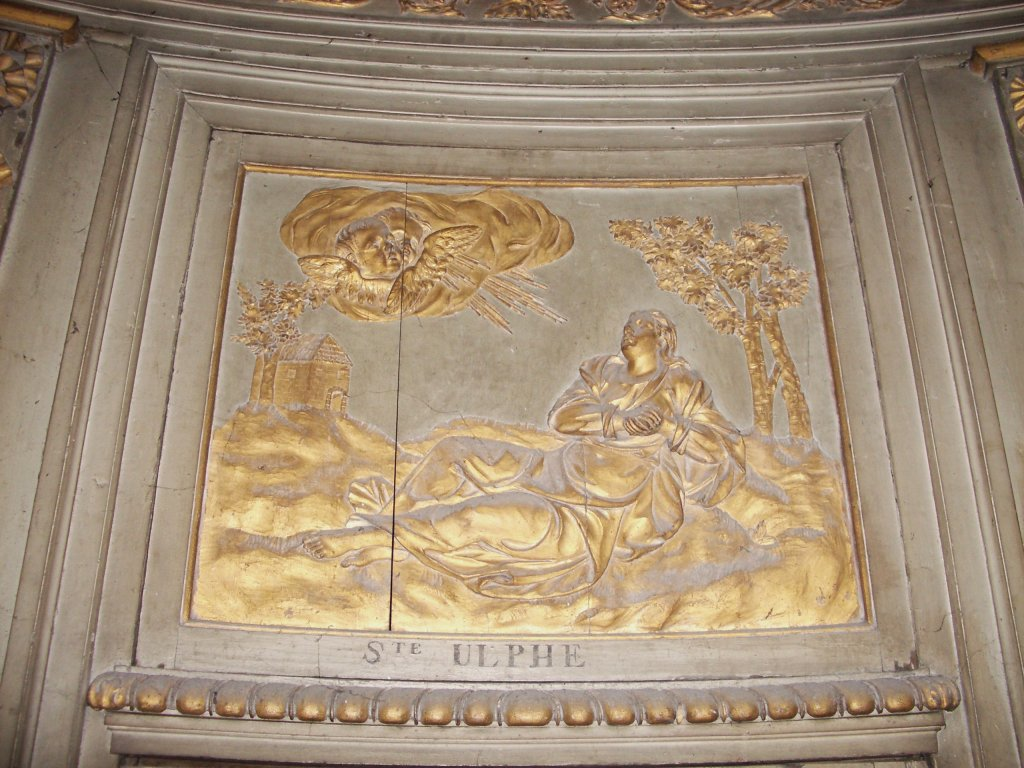
Bas relief of Ulphia in a chapel at the cathedral of Amiens.

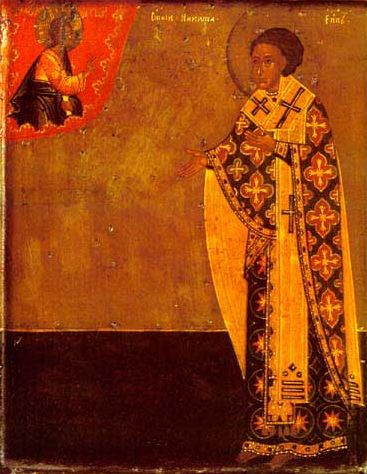
Venerable Nikita of Novgorod.

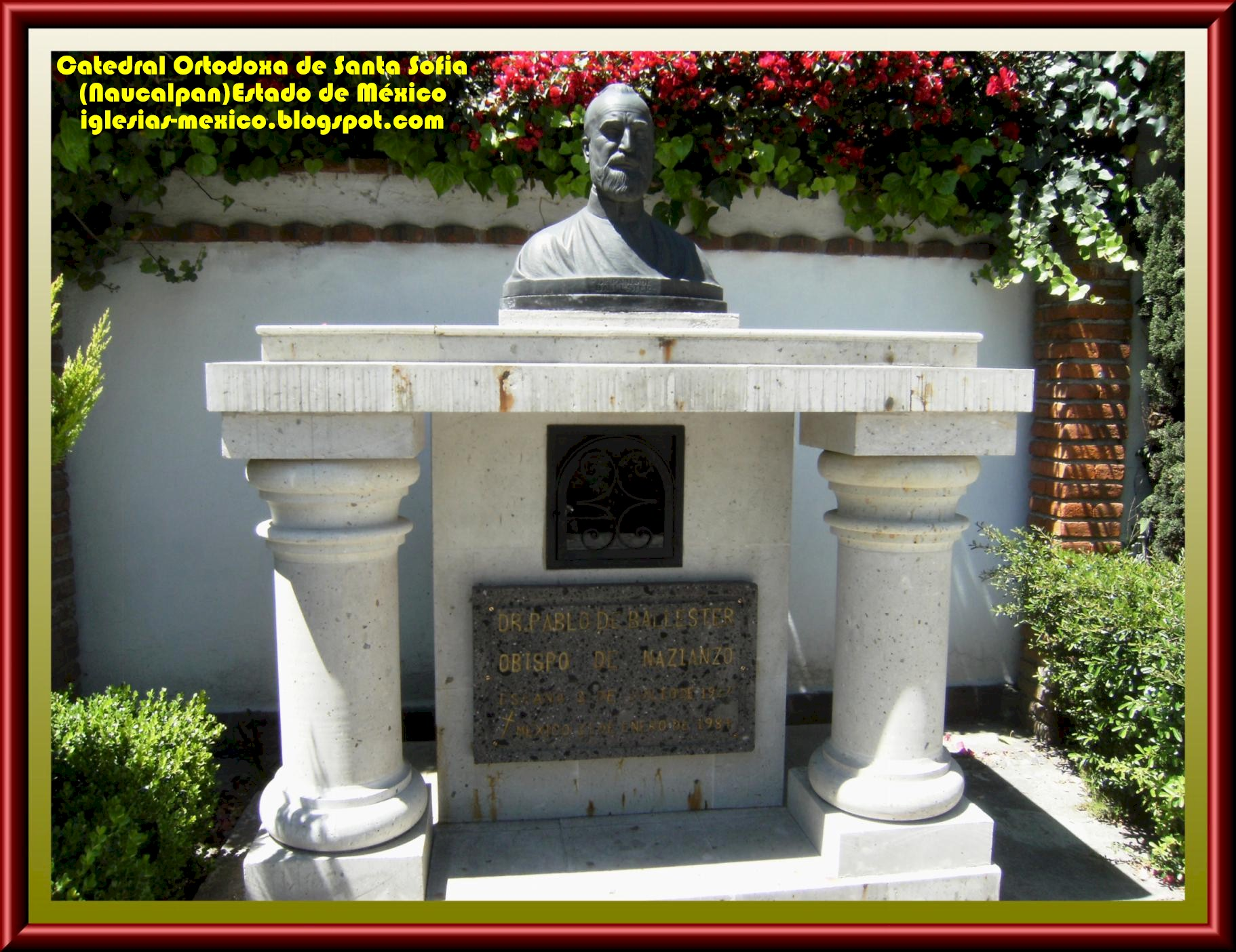
Monument to Bp. Paul of Nazianzus in Naucalpan, Mexico.

== Sources ==
- January 31 / February 13. Orthodox Calendar (PRAVOSLAVIE.RU).
- February 13 / January 31. HOLY TRINITY RUSSIAN ORTHODOX CHURCH (A parish of the Patriarchate of Moscow).
- January 31. OCA - The Lives of the Saints.
- The Autonomous Orthodox Metropolia of Western Europe and the Americas (ROCOR). St. Hilarion Calendar of Saints for the year of our Lord 2004. St. Hilarion Press (Austin, TX). p. 11.
- January 31. Latin Saints of the Orthodox Patriarchate of Rome.
- The Roman Martyrology. Transl. by the Archbishop of Baltimore. Last Edition, According to the Copy Printed at Rome in 1914. Revised Edition, with the Imprimatur of His Eminence Cardinal Gibbons. Baltimore: John Murphy Company, 1916. pp. 32–33.
- Rev. Richard Stanton. A Menology of England and Wales, or, Brief Memorials of the Ancient British and English Saints Arranged According to the Calendar, Together with the Martyrs of the 16th and 17th Centuries. London: Burns & Oates, 1892. pp. 42–43.

Greek Sources

- Great Synaxaristes: (in Greek) 31 ΙΑΝΟΥΑΡΙΟΥ. ΜΕΓΑΣ ΣΥΝΑΞΑΡΙΣΤΗΣ.
- (in Greek) Συναξαριστής. 31 Ιανουαρίου. ECCLESIA.GR. (H ΕΚΚΛΗΣΙΑ ΤΗΣ ΕΛΛΑΔΟΣ).

Russian Sources

- (in Russian) 13 февраля (31 января). Православная Энциклопедия под редакцией Патриарха Московского и всея Руси Кирилла (электронная версия). (Orthodox Encyclopedia - Pravenc.ru).
- (in Russian) 31 января (ст.ст.) 13 февраля 2013 (нов. ст.). Русская Православная Церковь Отдел внешних церковных связей. (DECR).
