= January 18 (Eastern Orthodox liturgics) =

Day in the Eastern Orthodox liturgical calendar

Eastern Orthodox liturgical calendar
January 17	January 18	January 19
January 18 O.S. ≍ January 31 N.S. January 18 N.S ≍ January 5 O.S.

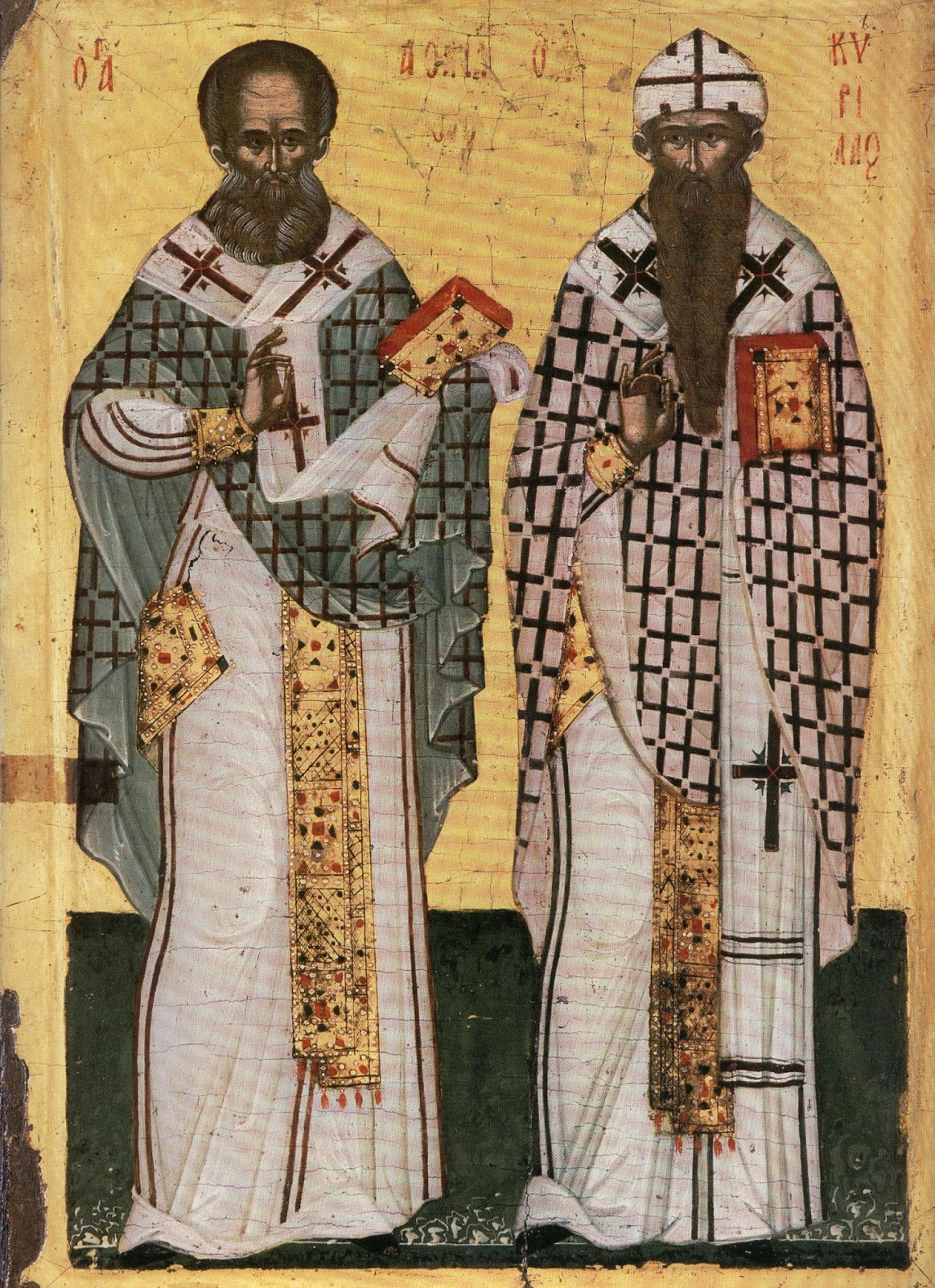
Saints Athanasius and Cyril of Alexandria. (Cretan icon, 16th-17th century).

January 18 in Eastern Orthodox liturgical calendars is a feast day and a day of commemoration of saints and martyrs. Although some Orthodox churches use the Revised Julian Calendar and others use the traditional Julian calendar, the fixed commemorations for their respective January 18 are broadly the same, no matter which calendar is used. (Note: Despite the dates being the same, the days to which they refer typically differ by 13 days. The notation Old Style or O.S. is sometimes used to indicate a date in the traditional Julian Calendar (the "Old Calendar"). The notation New Style or N.S, indicates a date in the Revised Julian calendar (the "New Calendar").)

== Saints ==
- Martyr Theodula and her companions Helladius, Theodoulos, Boethius, Evagrius, and Macarius, of Anazarbus, Cilicia (c. 304)
- Martyr Xenia, by fire.
- Saint Athanasius the Great, Patriarch of Alexandria (373)
- Venerable Marcian, Monk of Cyrrhus, Syria (c. 388)
- Venerable Silvanus (Sylvanus) the Ascetic of Gaza, Palestine (before 414)
- Saint Cyril, Patriarch of Alexandria (444)
- Venerable Ephraim (Ephraimios), Bishop of Mylasa, Caria, Asia Minor (5th century) (Note: Venerable Ephraimios is recorded in Sinai Codex 150.)

== Pre-Schism Western saints ==
- Virgin Martyr Prisca, venerated from ancient times in Rome, where a church is dedicated to her on the Aventine (1st or 3rd century)
- Martyrs Archelais, Thecla and Susanna, three holy virgins, at Salerno (293) (Note: Three holy virgins of the Romagna in Italy who went to Nola in the Campagna in order to escape death, but there too they were accused of being Orthodox, were tortured, taken to Salerno and beheaded.) (see also: June 6)
- Saint Volusianus of Tours, a married senator who was chosen Bishop of Tours in France and shortly after driven out by Arian Visigoths (496)
- Saint Liberata of Como, a holy virgin in Como in Italy where with her sister Saint Faustina she founded the convent of Santa Margarita (580)
- Saint Leobardus the Recluse of Marmoutier, Gaul (593)
- Saint Ninnidh of Inishmacsaint (Inismacsaint), Ireland (6th century) (see also: January 17)
- Saint Deicolus, one of the twelve disciples to accompany St. Columbanus in his missionary enterprise (625) (Note: A monk at Bangor in Ireland, he followed St. Columbanus to Burgundy in France, where he helped found the monastery of Luxeuil. Later he founded a second monastery in Lure in the Vosges.)
- Saint Ulfrid (Wolfred, Wulfrid, Wilfrid), missionary in Germany and Sweden, martyred for destroying an image of Thor (1028) (Note: "He was an Englishman of great learning and virtue; and preached the faith, first in Germany; afterwards in Sweden, under the pious king Olas II, who first took the title of king of Sweden; for his predecessors had only been styled kings of Upsal. The good bishop converted many to Christ, till in the year 1028, while he was preaching against the idol Tarstans or Thor, and hewing it down with a hatchet, he was slain by the pagans.") (Note: "In Sweden, the passion of ST. ULFRID, Martyr, who was an Englishman by birth, and went to preach to the pagans of that country. ULFRID, also called Wulfrid, was an Englishman, who, in obedience to a divine inspiration, quitted his native land, to preach the Gospel to the pagans of Sweden. His mission was attended with ample success, and many converts were made to the Faith. In his zeal for the destruction of the kingdom of Satan, in the presence of a multitude of people, he attacked the idol of Thor, and hewed it to pieces with an axe. Upon this, the furious idolaters immediately rushed upon the servant of God, and cruelly put him to death on the spot. They also treated his venerable remains with many insults, and cast them into a marsh, thus leaving them, until in better times Ulfrid was venerated as a Martyr of Christ. The commemoration in the old calendars is on the 18th of January.")

== Post-Schism Orthodox saints ==
- Venerable Ephraim the Lesser (the Philosopher) of Georgia (1101)
- Venerable Cyril, Abbot of Kiev (1146)
- Saint Joachim I, Patriarch of Tarnovo (Turnovo, Trnovo) and Bulgaria (1248)
- Venerable Schemamonk Cyril and Schemanun Maria (both c. 1337), parents of Saint Sergius of Radonezh (Note: See: (in Russian) Кирилл и Мария Радонежские. Википедии. (Russian Wikipedia).)
- Saint Maximus the New of Serbia, Metropolitan of Wallachia (1516), son of Saint Stefan Branković the Blind, Despot of Serbia
- Venerable Athanasius, Monk of Valaam Monastery and Abbot of Syamzha (Syadem, Syandema, Syandemsk, Syandemsky), Vologda Oblast (1550)
- Righteous Athanasius, Fool for Christ of Novolotsk (Navolotsk) Monastery, Karelia (16th-17th centuries)
- Venerable Christophoros "Papoulakos" (Panayiotopoulos), missionary monk and defender of Orthodoxy in the new Kingdom of Greece (1861) (Note: His glorification was initially proposed by the Metropolis of Kalavryta, of the Church of Greece, with the proposal confirmed by the Greek Holy Synod in May 2023. It was then passed on to the Synod of the Patriarchate of Constantinople. He was glorified by the Ecumenical Patriarchate on August 30, 2024. The official communiqué of the Ecumenical Patriarchate was as follows: (in Greek) "Συνεχιζομένων τῶν ἐργασιῶν τῆς Ἁγίας καί Ἱερᾶς Συνόδου, αὕτη ἀπεφάσισεν ὁμοφώνως ὅπως γένηται δεκτή ἡ εἰσήγησις τῆς Ἁγιωτάτης Ἐκκλησίας τῆς Ἑλλάδος περί κατατάξεως εἰς τό ἁγιολόγιον τῆς Ἐκκλησίας τοῦ μακαριστοῦ μοναχοῦ Χριστοφόρου Παναγιωτοπούλου τοῦ ἐπιλεγομένου Παπουλάκου, τῆς μνήμης αὐτοῦ ἑορταζομένης κατ᾿ ἔτος τήν 18ην Ἰανουαρίου.") (Note: In 1847, at nearly eighty years of age, the monk Christophoros Panayiotopoulos ("Papoulakos") c. 1770–1861, undertook a popular preaching mission in the villages of Achaea to revitalize the spiritual conditions of the people which were slowly becoming westernized with an Enlightenment ideology, affecting the sociological make up of the newborn Greek state within a decade. Ultimately Papoulakos helped bring the Greek people back to their roots in Orthodoxy and the Christian ideal, for which he suffered much persecution from both the Church and State and died in exile, and is today renowned as a great ascetic and hero of modern Greece. "Moving as he did amongst the people and seeing the consequences of the Bavarian government's policies, his preaching turned to contemporary politics. He fiercely denounced the autocephaly and the abolition of ancient metropolitan sees, which left the people shepherd-less. He condemned the dissolution of monasteries, foreign missionaries, and the non-Orthodox schools they had established and the exclusion of the sacred Scriptures (i.e., the Septuagint) from the schools. Behind these acts Papoulakos saw a clear aim: 'It is their purpose to ruin our religion.' And he lists the guilty: the English who controlled the state with their loan; the foreigners, the 'Luthero-Calvinists,' Bavarians and missionaries who were swamping Greece; Kairis, 'who had lit the match;' Pharmakidis, 'who had poured out the poison;' the Synod which had meekly accepted the foreigners' schemes and which Papoulakos calls 'polluted, diabolical, sealed with Armannsperg's seal.' ") (Note: See: (in Greek) Άγιος Χριστοφόρος Παπουλάκος. Βικιπαίδεια. (Greek Wikipedia).)
- Venerable Alexis Shushania, Hieromonk of Teklati, Georgia (1923)

=== New martyrs and confessors ===
- New Hieromartyr Michael Kargopolov, Priest (1919) (Note: See: (in Russian) Каргополов, Михаил. Википедии. (Russian Wikipedia).)
- New Hieromartyr Eugene Isadsky, Priest (1930)
- New Hieromartyr Vladimir Zubkovich, Archpriest of Smolevichi, Belorussia (1938)
- New Hieromartyrs Nicholas Krasovsky, (Note: See: (in Russian) Красовский, Николай Константинович (священник). Википедии. (Russian Wikipedia).) Sergius Lebedev, and Alexander Rousinov, (Note: See: (in Russian) Русинов, Александр Владимирович. Википедии. (Russian Wikipedia).) Priests (1938)

== Other commemorations ==
- Slaying of Bishop Paul de Ballester-Convallier of Mexico (1984) (see also: January 31 - N.S.)

== Icon gallery ==
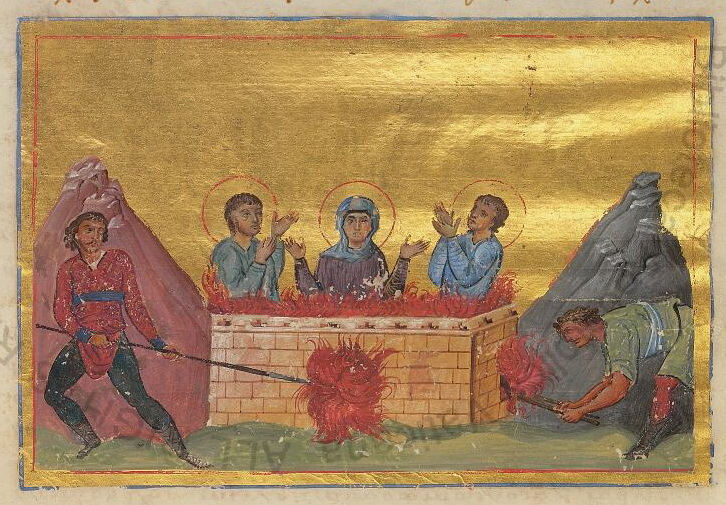
Martyr Theodula and her companions, of Anazarbus, Cilicia.
(Menologion of Basil II, 10th century).

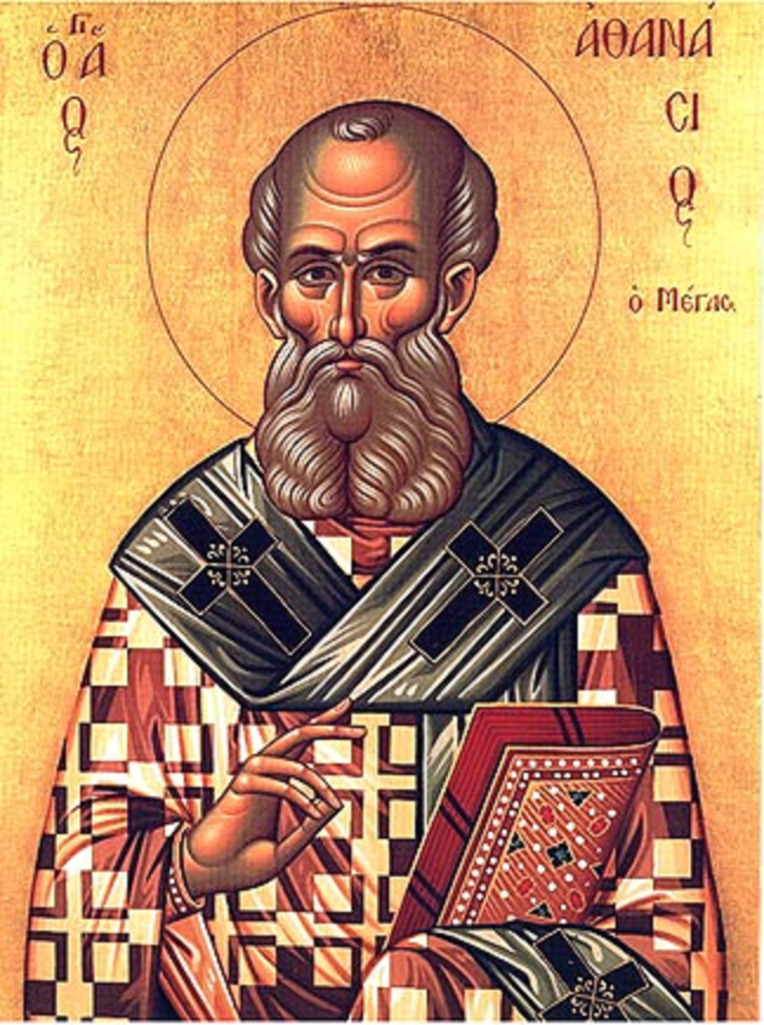
Saint Athanasius the Great.

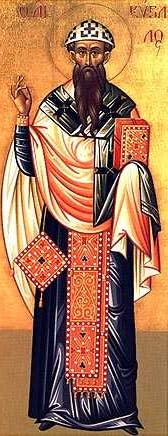
Saint Cyril of Alexandria.

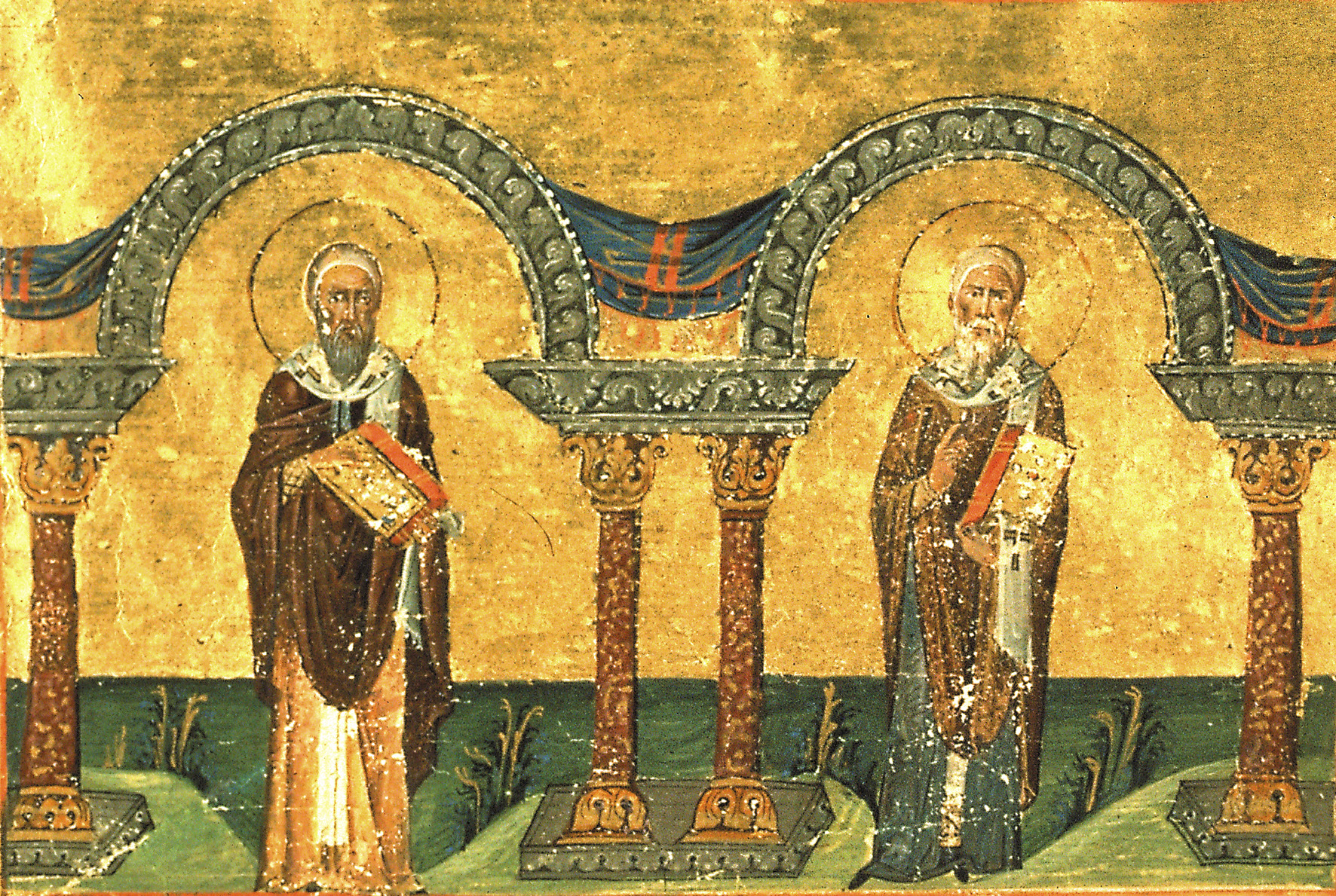
Saints Athanasius and Cyril of Alexandria.
(Menologion of Basil II, 10th century).

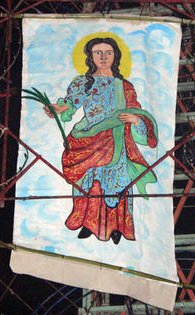
Virgin-martyr Prisca.

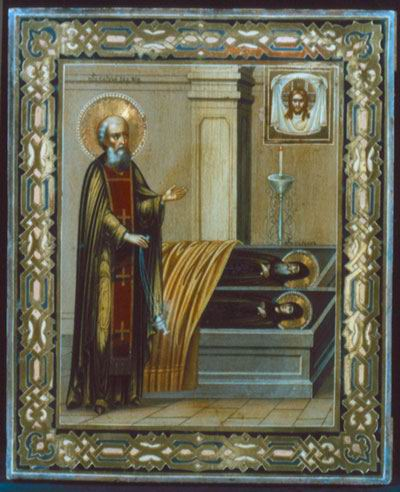
St. Sergius of Radonezh in front of the coffins of his parents: Venerable Schemamonk Cyril and Schemanun Maria.

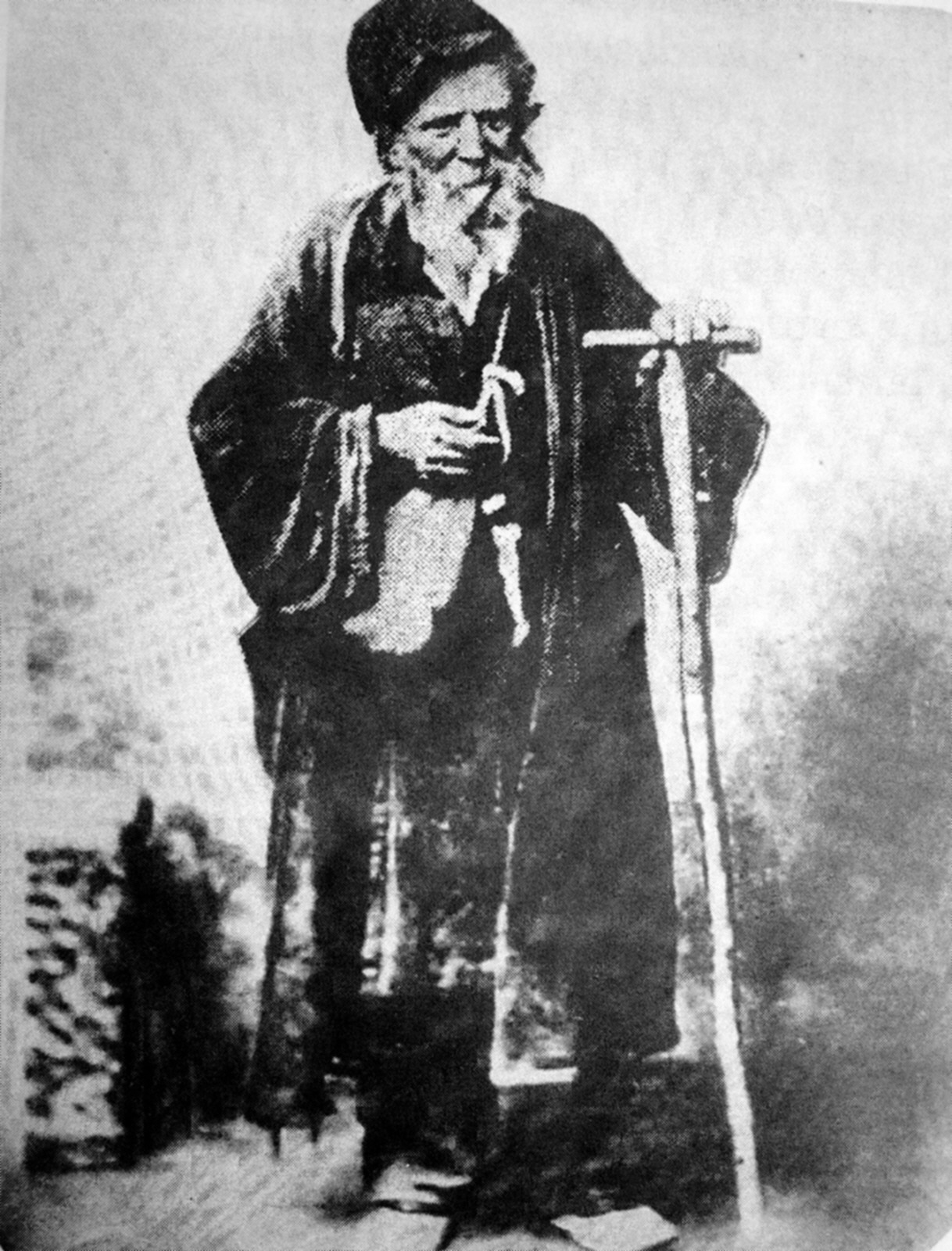
St. Christophoros Panayiotopoulos ("Papoulakos"), missionary monk.

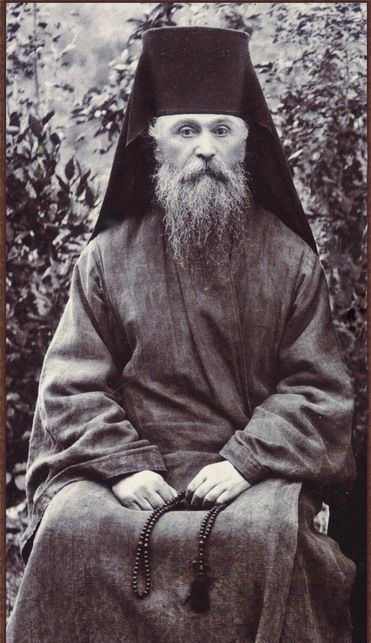
St. Alexis Shushania, Hieromonk of Teklati, Georgia.

New Hieromartyr Alexander Rousinov, Archpriest.

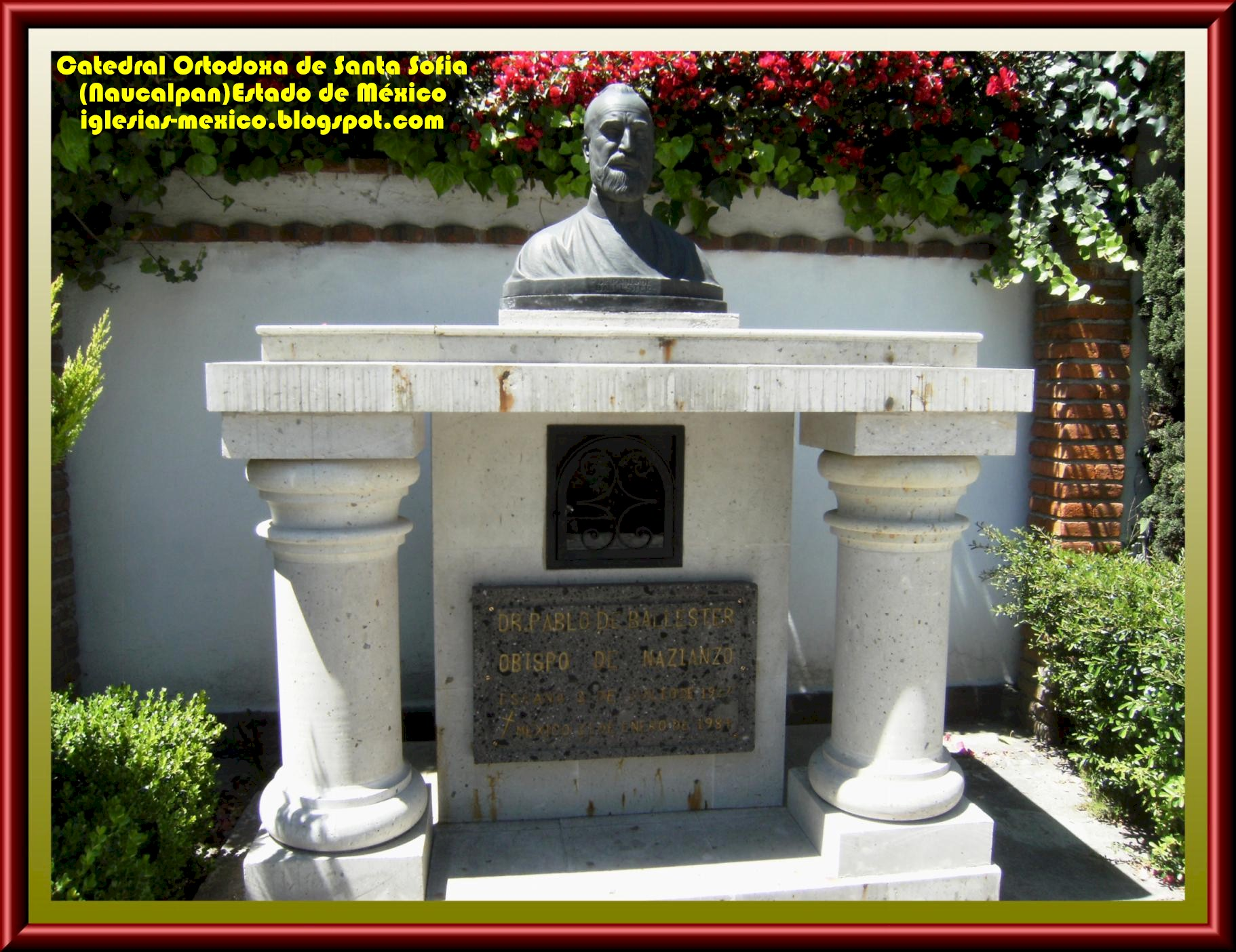
Monument to Bp. Paul of Nazianzus, in Naucalpan, Mexico.

== Sources ==
- January 18/January 31. Orthodox Calendar (PRAVOSLAVIE.RU).
- January 31 / January 18. HOLY TRINITY RUSSIAN ORTHODOX CHURCH (A parish of the Patriarchate of Moscow).
- January 18. OCA - The Lives of the Saints.
- The Autonomous Orthodox Metropolia of Western Europe and the Americas (ROCOR). St. Hilarion Calendar of Saints for the year of our Lord 2004. St. Hilarion Press (Austin, TX). p. 8.
- January 18. Latin Saints of the Orthodox Patriarchate of Rome.
- The Roman Martyrology. Transl. by the Archbishop of Baltimore. Last Edition, According to the Copy Printed at Rome in 1914. Revised Edition, with the Imprimatur of His Eminence Cardinal Gibbons. Baltimore: John Murphy Company, 1916. pp. 18–19.

Greek Sources

- Great Synaxaristes: (in Greek) 18 ΙΑΝΟΥΑΡΙΟΥ. ΜΕΓΑΣ ΣΥΝΑΞΑΡΙΣΤΗΣ.
- (in Greek) Συναξαριστής. 18 Ιανουαρίου. ECCLESIA.GR. (H ΕΚΚΛΗΣΙΑ ΤΗΣ ΕΛΛΑΔΟΣ).

Russian Sources

- (in Russian) 31 января (18 января). Православная Энциклопедия под редакцией Патриарха Московского и всея Руси Кирилла (электронная версия). (Orthodox Encyclopedia - Pravenc.ru).
- (in Russian) 18 января (ст.ст.) 31 января 2014 (нов. ст.). Русская Православная Церковь Отдел внешних церковных связей. (DECR).
