= February 5 (Eastern Orthodox liturgics) =

Day in the Eastern Orthodox liturgical calendar

Eastern Orthodox liturgical calendar
February 4	February 5	February 6
February 5 O.S. ≍ February 18 N.S. February 5 N.S ≍ January 23 O.S.

An Eastern Orthodox cross

February 5 in Eastern Orthodox liturgical calendars is a feast day and a day of commemoration of saints and martyrs. Although some Orthodox churches use the Revised Julian Calendar and others use the traditional Julian calendar, the fixed commemorations for their respective February 5 are broadly the same, no matter which calendar is used. (Note: Despite the dates being the same, the days to which they refer typically differ by 13 days. The notation Old Style or O.S. is sometimes used to indicate a date in the traditional Julian Calendar (the "Old Calendar"). The notation New Style or N.S, indicates a date in the Revised Julian calendar (the "New Calendar").)

== Feasts ==
- Afterfeast of the Meeting of our Lord in the Temple.

== Saints ==
- Martyr Agatha of Catania in Sicily (251) (Note: Born in Catania in Sicily, where she was martyred. She was handed over to a prostitute and her breasts were cut off. The Apostle Peter healed her of this mutilation while she was in prison, where she subsequently reposed. The miracles by which she has preserved Catania from successive eruptions of Mt Etna are well accredited.) (Note: "At Catania, in Sicily, in the time of the emperor Decius and the judge Quinctian, the birthday of St. Agatha, virgin and martyr. After being buffeted, imprisoned, tortured, racked, dragged over pieces of earthenware and burning coals, and having her breasts cut off, she consummated her sacrifice in prison while engaged in prayer.") (Note: Name days celebrated today include: Agatha (Ἀγάθη).)
- Martyr Theodula of Anazarbus in Cilicia, and with her Martyrs Helladius, Macarius, Boethos, and Evagrius (304)
- Venerable Theodosius of Skopelos in Cilicia (c. 421)
- Saint Polyeuctus of Constantinople, Patriarch of Constantinople (970)
- Venerable Sabbas the New of Sicily, Abbot (995)

== Pre-Schism Western saints ==
- Saint Agricola, the eleventh Bishop of Tongres in Belgium (420)
- Saint Avitus of Vienne, Bishop of Vienne, Gaul (520) (Note: Born in Auvergne in France, he was the brother of St Apollinaris, Bishop of Valence. Their father St Isychius, a Roman senator, had also been Bishop of Vienne. Avitus succeeded him. As a bishop he commanded the respect of his flock, both of the pagan Franks and the Arian Burgundians. He converted the Burgundian King, Sigismund. St Avitus was also a fine writer.) (Note: "At Vienne, blessed Avitus, bishop and confessor, whose faith, labors and admirable learning protected France against the ravages of the Arian heresy.")
- Saints Genuinus (Ingenuinus), Bishop of Sabiona, and Albinus (7th century) (Note: A Bishop of Sabion near Brixen in the Tyrol in Austria. He is commemorated with St Albinus, Bishop of Brixen in the 11th century.) (Note: "At Brixen, the holy bishops Genuinus and Albinus, whose lives were illustrious for miracles.")
- Saint Bertulf of Renty (O.S.B.) (705) (Note: Born in Pannonia, he moved to Flanders in Belgium where he became Orthodox and a priest and founded a monastery.)
- Saint Indract of Glastonbury (c. 710) (Note: Born in Ireland, on his return from a pilgrimage to Rome he was murdered by heathen with his sister St Dominica (Drusa) and others near Glastonbury in England. Their relics were enshrined there.) (see also: May 8)
- Saint Modestus, Bishop of Carinthia and Apostle of Carantania (c. 722) (Note: A monk in Salzburg, he became Bishop of Carinthia in Austria and was largely responsible for its enlightenment.)
- Saint Vodoaldus (Voel, Vodalus, Vodalis), born in Ireland, he went to France and reposed as a hermit near Soissons (c. 725)
- Saint Adelaide, Abbess of Vilich (c. 1015) (Note: Abbess of Willich near Bonn in Germany and of Our Lady of the Capitol in Cologne. Both convents were founded by her father.)
- Saint Agatha Hildegard of Carinthia, wife of the Count of Carinthia in Austria (1024) (Note: She was a model of devotion and patience under the brutal ill-treatment of her jealous husband whom she later converted.)

== Post-Schism Orthodox saints ==
- Saint Theodosius of Chernigov, Archbishop of Chernigov (1696) (Note: See: (in Russian) Феодосий Черниговский. Википедии. (Russian Wikipedia))
- New Martyr Anthony of Athens, at Constantinople (1774)

=== New martyrs and confessors ===
- New Martyr Nicholas Tsikura (1918)
- New Martyrs Matushka Agatha (Agafia) (1938), and with her Schemamonk Eugene (1939) and Righteous Paramon (1941), of Belorussia.
- Virgin-martyr Alexandra, and martyr Michael (1942)

== Other commemorations ==
- Synaxis of the Icon of the Most Holy Theotokos "Eletsk-Chernigov" (1060)
- Synaxis of the Icon of the Most Holy Theotokos "Sicilian-Divnogorsky" ("the Rescuer of the Drowning") (1092)
- Synaxis of the Icon of the Most Holy Theotokos "Seeking of the Lost" (17th century)
- Repose of Metropolitan Michael (Jovanovich) of Serbia (1897)
- Repose of Valeriu Gafencu of Bessarabia, Romania (1952)
- Repose of Abbess Agnia of Nizhni-Novgorod (1954)

== Icon gallery ==
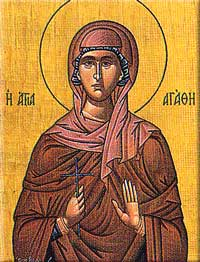
Martyr Agatha of Catania in Sicily.

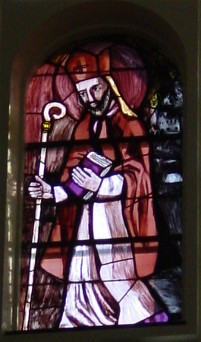
St Modestus, Bishop of Carinthia and Apostle of Carantania.

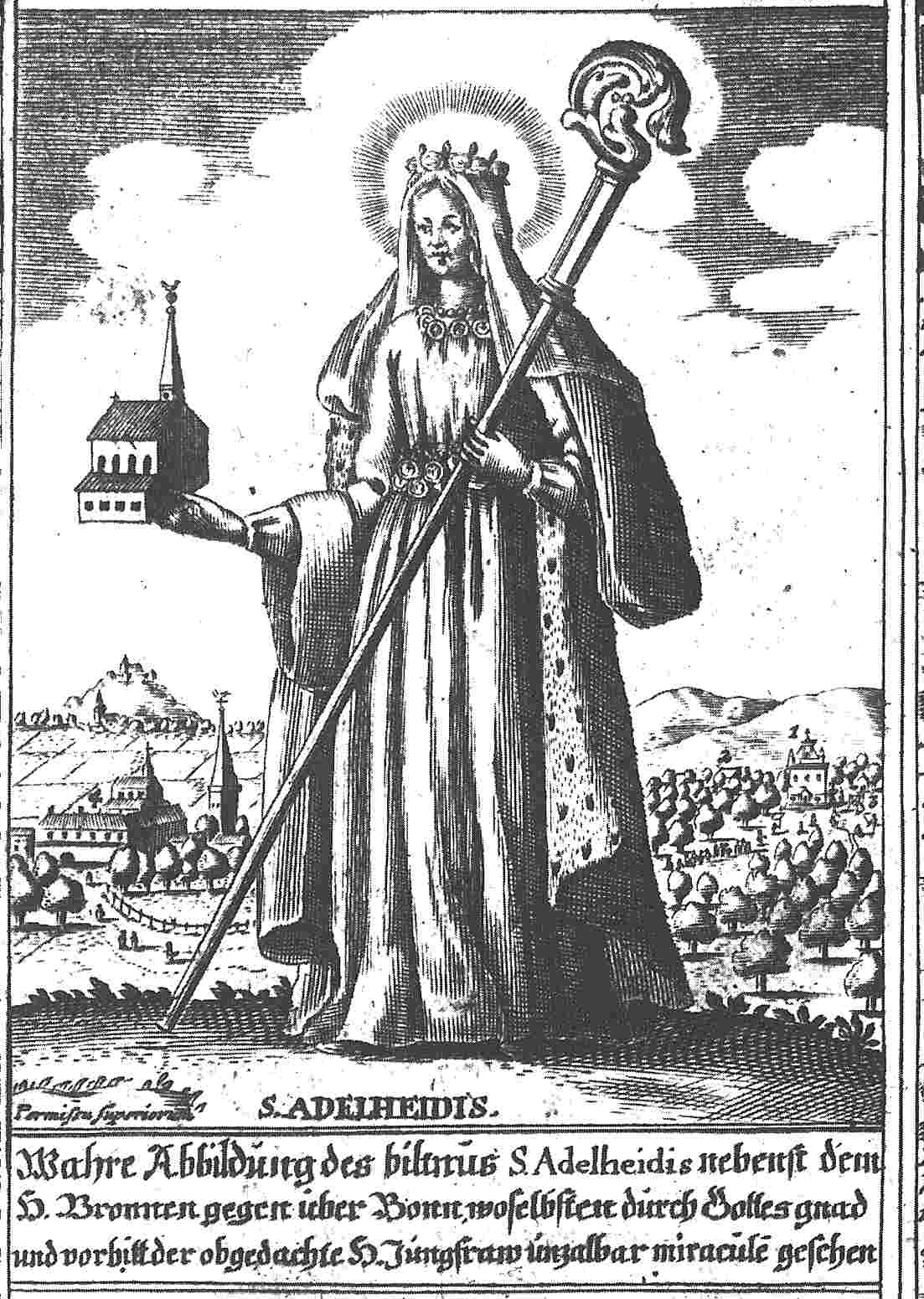
St Adelaide of Vilich.

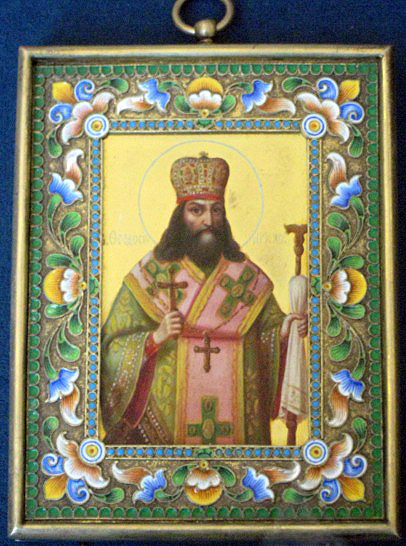
St Theodosius of Chernigov.

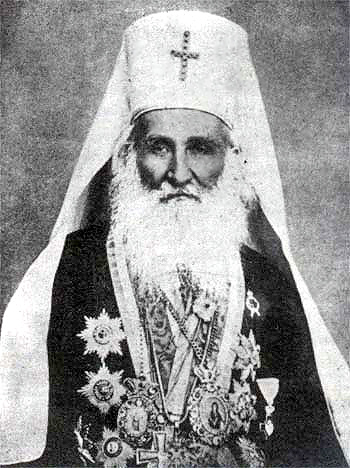
Metropolitan Michael (Jovanovich) of Serbia.

== Sources ==
- February 5 / 18. Orthodox Calendar (Pravoslavie.ru).
- February 18 / 5. Holy Trinity Russian Orthodox Church (A parish of the Patriarchate of Moscow).
- February 5. OCA - The Lives of the Saints.
- The Autonomous Orthodox Metropolia of Western Europe and the Americas. St. Hilarion Calendar of Saints for the year of our Lord 2004. St. Hilarion Press (Austin, TX). p. 13.
- The Fifth Day of the Month of February. Orthodoxy in China.
- February 5. Latin Saints of the Orthodox Patriarchate of Rome.
- The Roman Martyrology. Transl. by the Archbishop of Baltimore. Last Edition, According to the Copy Printed at Rome in 1914. Revised Edition, with the Imprimatur of His Eminence Cardinal Gibbons. Baltimore: John Murphy Company, 1916. pp. 38–39.
- Rev. Richard Stanton. A Menology of England and Wales, or, Brief Memorials of the Ancient British and English Saints Arranged According to the Calendar, Together with the Martyrs of the 16th and 17th Centuries. London: Burns & Oates, 1892. pp. 54-55.

Greek Sources

- Great Synaxaristes: (in Greek) 5 Φεβρουαρίου. Μεγασ Συναξαριστησ.
- (in Greek) Συναξαριστής. 5 Φεβρουαρίου. Ecclesia.gr. (H Εκκλησια Τησ Ελλαδοσ).

Russian Sources

- (in Russian) 18 февраля (5 февраля). Православная Энциклопедия под редакцией Патриарха Московского и всея Руси Кирилла (электронная версия). (Orthodox Encyclopedia - Pravenc.ru).
