= Theodula of Anazarbus =

Christian saint

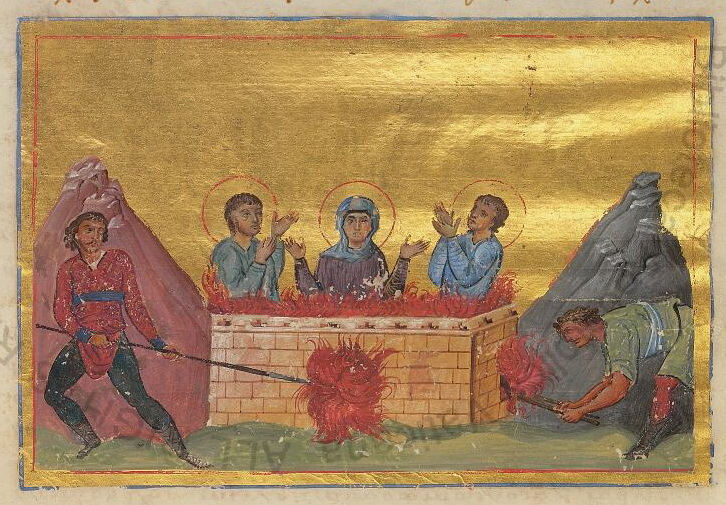

Theodula of Anazarbus was an early Christian saint and martyr who lived in the city of Anazarbus (Asia Minor) during the reign of the Roman emperors Diocletian (284–305) and Maximian (305–311).

Little is known of her life. Her vita records, however, that when brought forward to sacrifice to the Roman gods she merely blew and the statue of the deified Hadrian fell to dust before her. She also survived many tortures and that the Roman governor Pelagius died while watching one of these being administered. Tradition also holds that she converted her torturer to Christianity before both she and he were executed. She was believed to have been put to death along with Boethus, Evagrius and Macarius.

She is considered a saint of the Roman Catholic and Orthodox churches. with a feast day celebrated on January 18 and February 5.
