= Tryphaena of Cyzicus =

Saint Tryphaena of Cyzicus
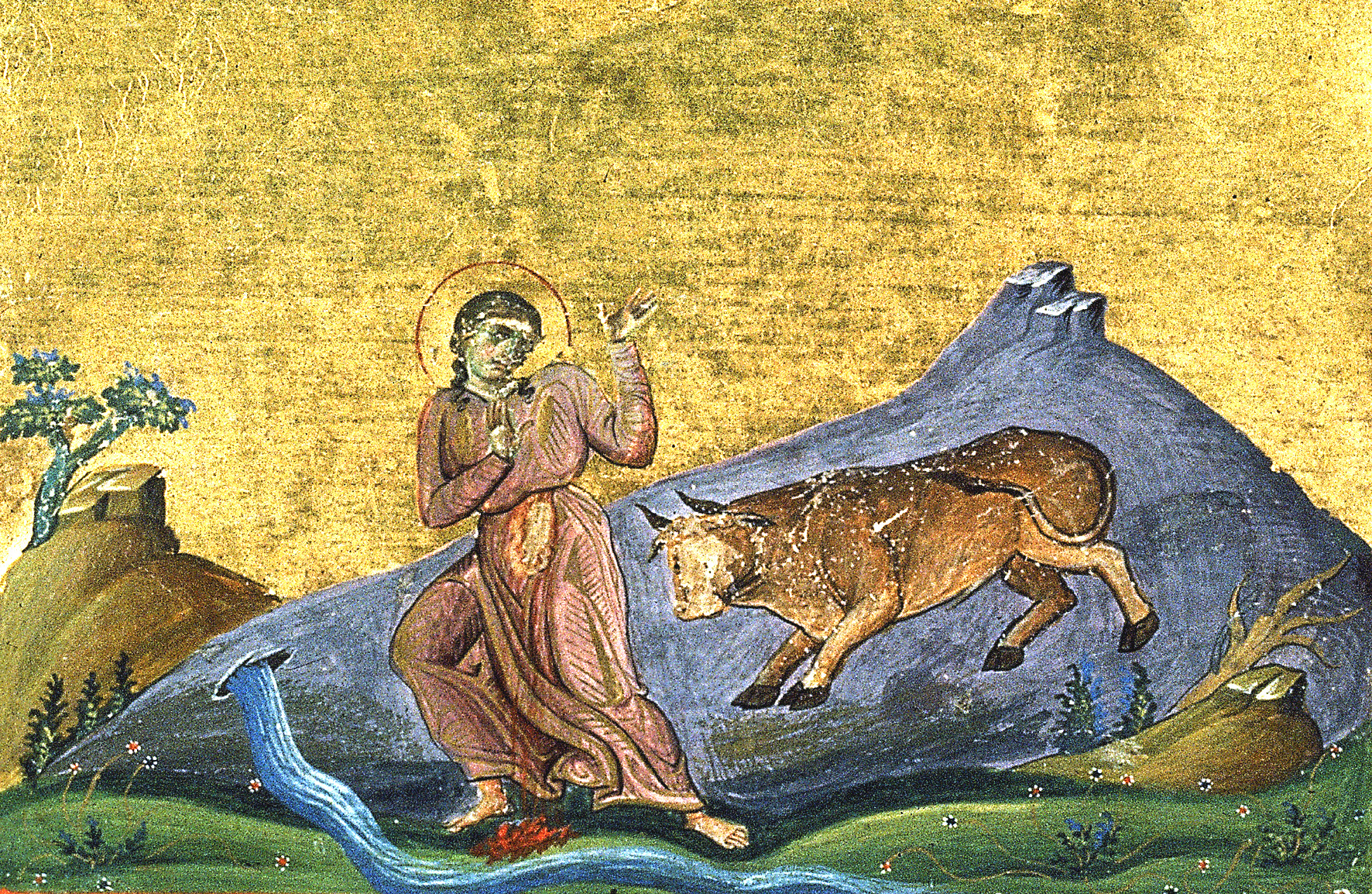
- The death of Tryphaenes at Cyzicus as depicted in the Menologion of Basil II
- Born: Tryphaena; Cyzicus, Roman Empire

Tryphaena (name in Greek: η Τρύφαινα or Τρυφαίνη, flourished 1st century) was a Roman Christian woman that lived in the Roman Empire.

== Life ==
She was the daughter of Roman nobles Anastasius and Socratia. Her parents named her in honor of Antonia Tryphaena, who was a prominent citizen in Cyzicus and was a Pontian Princess, who was a former Roman client Queen of Thrace. From whom Tryphaena was named after, in Cyzicus she always connected to Antonia Tryphaena. Cyzicus is an ancient Greek city, which is located in modern Turkey.

Tryphaena was born and raised in Cyzicus. The local Roman Governor Caesarius had convicted Tryphaena, because she refused to believe in the pagan Roman religion, instead Tryphaena chose to be a follower of Jesus. Caesarius considered this as a mockery to the Roman State religion and ordered her execution.

Tryphaena was one of the many martyrs who gave her life to Christianity. Roman officers threw Tryphaena into a red-hot oven; then tied her from a high tree to throw her into sharp spears and then they took her away to be devoured by carnivores. When the Roman soldiers realised that the Lord preserved her unharmed, they finally threw her to a mad bull, which tore her apart. Tryphaena finally died.

== Veneration ==
Tryphaena is one of the many saints who come from Cyzicus and she is the patroness saint of the city. She is a Saint in the Orthodox Church and Roman Catholic Church. Her feast day in the Orthodox Church is 31 January, while in the Roman Catholic Church her feast day is 31 January.

== See also ==
- Deaconess
- Cyzicus
