= Saint Domitius =

Domitius of Amiens
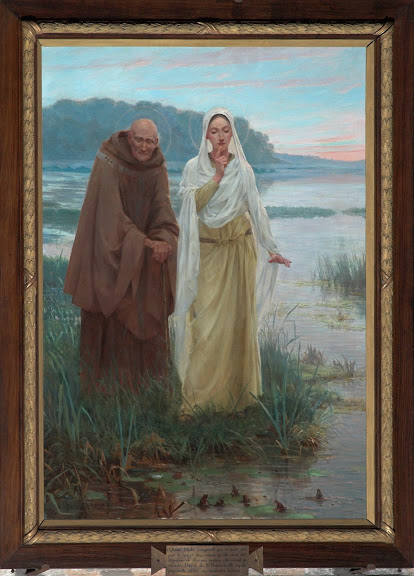
- Saint Domitius pictured with Saint Ulphia
- Died: 8th century

Saint Domitius (Domice) of Amiens (fl. 8th century) is a French saint, venerated especially in the diocese of Amiens.

== Legend ==
A former canon of Notre-Dame of Amiens, Domitius had given up his prebend to live a solitary life. Based on the readings for his office, hagiographer Laurentius Surius says that Domitius was not a priest, but a deacon of the church of Amiens who became a hermit at Saint-Acheul along the banks of the Avre. He is remembered for providing spiritual guidance to Saint Ulphia.

One of the statues in the portal of Amiens Cathedral has been identified as Domitius. There is also a painting of Domitius with Saint Ulphia in the cathedral. The painting is attributed to the nineteenth century painter, Jean de Franqueville.

Domitius is commemorated on October 23. He is not listed in the 2004 revised edition of the Roman Martyrology.
