= Evgeny Pogozhev =

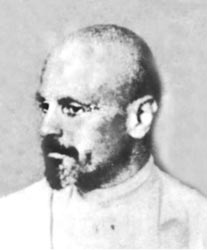
- Evgeny Pogozhev in 1931, several days before the execution
- Born: 21 April 1870; Moscow, Russian Empire
- Died: 13 February 1931 (aged 60); Leningrad, USSR
- Citizenship: Russian Empire • USSR
- Occupation: Writer
- Writing career
- Pen name: E. Poselyanin
- Subject: Christianity • Russian Orthodoxy • Russian history

Evgeny Nikolayevich Pogozhev (Russian: Евгений Николаевич Погожев), 21 April 1870, Moscow, Russian Empire, – 13 February 1931, Leningrad, USSR was a Russian religious writer, essayist and journalist, better known under the pseudonym Evgeny Poselyanin (Eugene the villager).

Among his best known books are Starets Ilarion Troyekurovsky (Старец Иларион Троекуровский, 1895), Poetry of Faith. A.N. Maykov, the Poet of Russia and Russian Orthodoxy (Поэзия веры и А. Н. Майков как поэт Православия и России, 1898), Sacred Sites of the Russian Land (Святыни Земли Русской, 1899), Konstantin Nikolayevich Leontyev (Константин Николаевич Леонтьев, 1900), The Tale of Saint Leaders of the Russian Land (Сказание о святых вождях Земли Русской, 1900), Christ's Warriors. Tales From the Lives of Saints (Воины Христовы. Рассказы из жизни святых, 1902), Petersburg Relics (Петербургские святыни, (1903), Letters on Monastic Life (Письма о монашестве, 1911).

In 1924 Pogozhev was accused of founding a monarchist organization in Leningrad and deported to the Angarsk region in Siberia where he spent two years. In the late 1930, as the persecution of the Russian Orthodox Church in the USSR was reaching its height, Evgeny Pogozhev was arrested. On 13 February 1931 he was executed. His major works re-issued in the 1990s, there's been considerable rise of interest in E.Poselynin's legacy in the Russian Orthodox community over the recent years.

== Literature ==
- Антонов В. В. Мученик Евгений – русский духовный писатель Евгений Николаевич Погожев (Е. Поселянин). Биографический очерк // Санкт-Петербургские епархиальные ведомости. 1997. — No. 17. — С. 131–135.
- Стрижев А. Свидетель благочестия: [Духовный писатель Евгений Поселянин] // Москва. — 2001. — No. 1. — С. 227–231.
- Антонов В. В. Поселя́нин Е. // Русские писатели, 1800—1917 : Биографический словарь / гл. ред. П. А. Николаев. — М. : Большая российская энциклопедия, 2007. — Т. 5 : П—С. — С. 100–102. — 800 с. — (Сер. биогр. словарей: Русские писатели. 11—20 вв.). — 5000 экз. — ISBN 5-85270-011-8. (т. 5).
- Антонов В. Поселянин Евгений // Литературный Санкт-Петербург. XX век: прозаики, поэты, драматурги, переводчики : энциклопедический словарь : в 2 т. / гл. ред. и сост. О. В. Богданова. — Санкт-Петербург: Филологический фак. СПбГУ, 2011. — Т. 2: Л-Я. — 606 с. — ISBN 978-5-8465-1103-3.
- Шкаровский М. В. «Преображенские дела» 1930—1931 гг // Христианское чтение. — 2020. — No. 6. — С. 198–218.
- Макаренко Е. К. Жанровое своеобразие биографических очерков о русских подвижниках Е. Поселянина // Вестник Томского государственного педагогического университета. 2021. — No. 1 (213). — С. 95–103.
