= Pablo de Ballester =

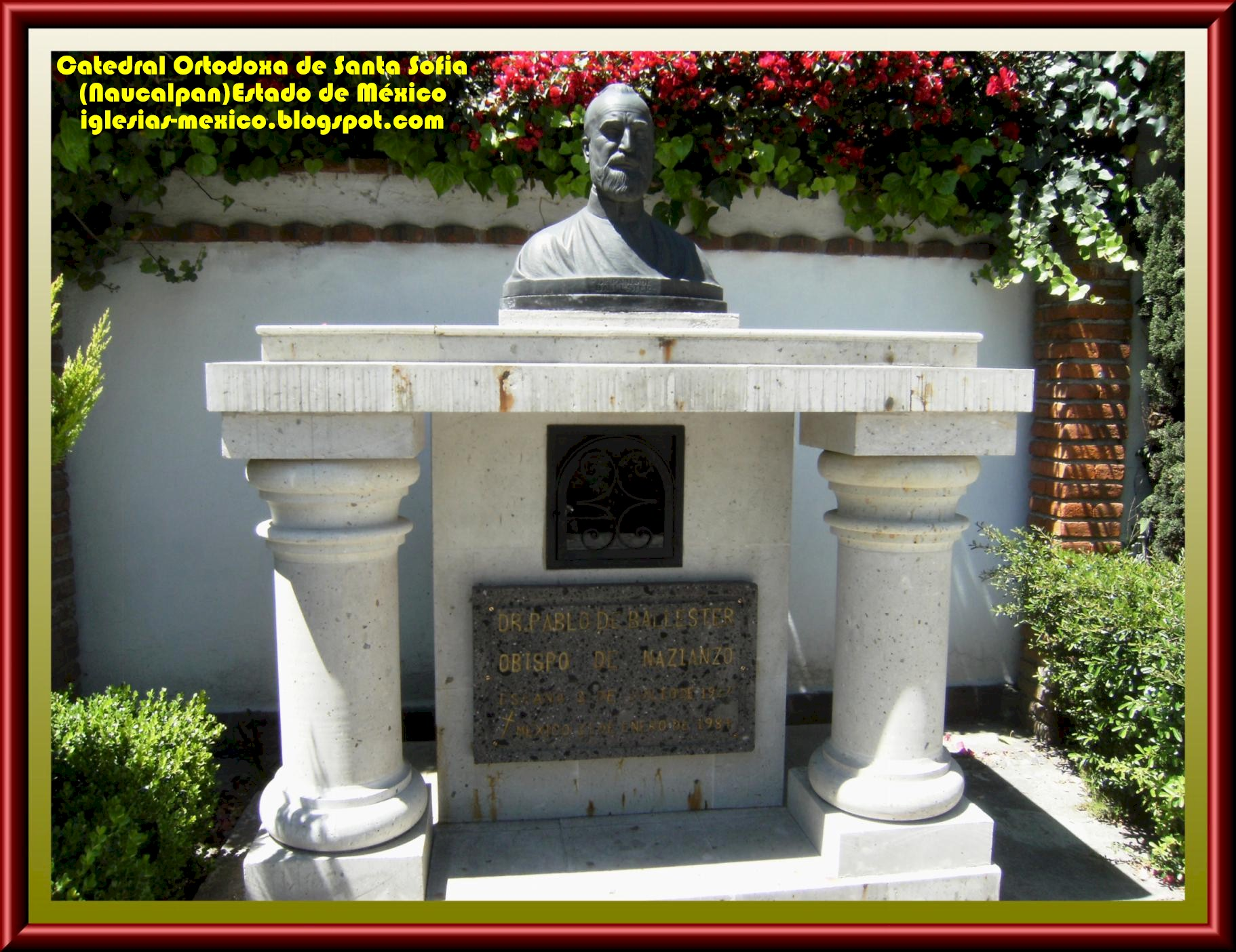
Monument to Bishop Paul of Nazianzus in Naucalpan, Mexico

Pablo de Ballester of Nazianzus (3 July 1927 – 31 January 1984) was a convert from Roman Catholicism to Eastern Orthodoxy who became the titular bishop of Nazianzus in Mexico, and was martyred in 1984.

In addition to his religious and pastoral activities, Bishop Paul was a historian, philosopher and humanist. Besides his native Catalan and Spanish, he also knew Greek, French, Italian, English, Latin, and Portuguese. His father Francisco Ballester Gales was a prominent speaker of the Ido international language (esperanto-reformed). He co-authored a method to learn this international language.

== Life ==
Pablo de Ballester-Convallier was born in 1927 in Barcelona, Spain, in a prominent Aragonese family. The dismemberment of his family during the Spanish Civil War impacted him deeply, leading him to follow religious life, studying theology among the Sarrià Capuchins before becoming a novice in a monastery of the Capuchin Order in Arenys de Mar. Working in its library, he came across anathemas from the Inquisition against all who supported the autonomous apostolic validity of the Apostle Paul, which he later found to be repeated by popes John XXII, Clement VI, Pius X and Benedict XV. Being thereby discouraged by his confessor to study the Bible and the Church Fathers, he renounced papal supremacy, moving to Madrid, where he was able to join the Anglican Church and established communication with the World Council of Churches, eventually meeting Orthodox Christians.

Orthodox Christianity became increasingly more interesting to Pablo, leading him to buy Greek and Russian books from Western shops, as well as some provided by Archimandrite Benedict Katsenavakis, from Naples. In 1953, aware there was still no Orthodox presence in Spain, he contacted the Church of Greece and the Ecumenical Patriarchate, being received in Athens by Archbishop Spyridon of Athens and Metropolitan Dionysius of Servia and Kozani, ordained into the deaconate by the latter in the same year, and into priesthood by Bishop Chrysostom of Marathon. He was a minister in the Church of Constantinople for five years, and then in the Greek Orthodox Archdiocese of America for eleven more, until in 1970 he was named Titular Bishop of Nazianzus by the Holy Synod presided by Patriarch Athenagoras, being consecrated in the same year in a ceremony presided by Archbishop Iakovos of America, receiving his seat in Mexico.

Bishop Paul's work in Mexico as a churchman, university professor and author was conspicuous, with his deeds including the foundation of the Hellenic Cultural Institute in Mexico City in 1973, in the purpose of publicize culture in Mexico through conferences, courses, workshops, licentiates and masters in arts, Mexican history, culture and the humanities, as well as a diversity of cultural activities.

His activities, however, came to end on 31 January 1984, after celebrating divine liturgy in Mexico City, when he was shot dead by Rafael Roman Mondrago, a mentally disturbed Mexican, who then shot himself in an apparent suicide attempt. Authorities did not discard the possibility that the murderer would be driven by some sort of religious fanaticism. His funeral was attended by Archbishop Iakovos.

In a visit to Mexico in 2006, Patriarch Bartholomew I of Constantinople asked Metropolitan Athenagoras of Mexico and Central America to transfer the relics of the late Bishop Paul to the Metropolis and be laid to rest in the Cathedral Church of Saint Sophia, in Naucalpan, where a monument is dedicated to him.

Regnal titles
Preceded by Dionysios (Psiahas)	Bishop of Nazianzus; 1970–1984	Succeeded by vacant
