= Ulphia =

French saint

Saint Ulphia
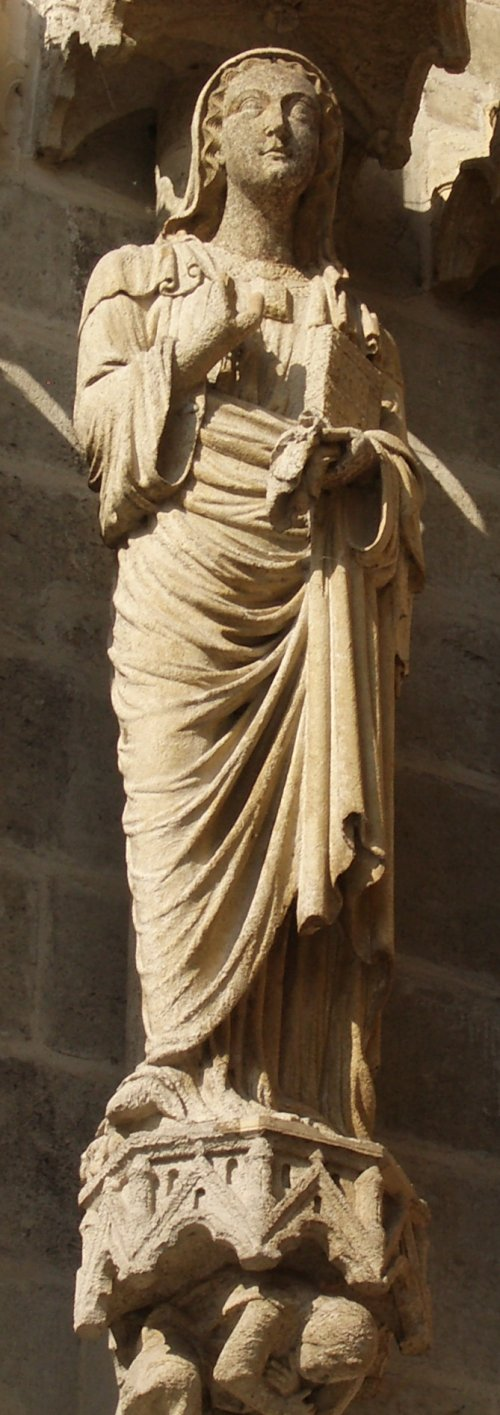
- Statue of Ulphia at Amiens Cathedral.
- Born: 8th century
- Died: What is now Fouencamps, France.
- Venerated in: Orthodox Church; Roman Catholic Church
- Major shrine: Amiens Cathedral
- Feast: January 31
- Attributes: Depicted as a young nun seated in prayer on a rock with a frog in the pool near her
- Patronage: Amphibians, keepers of amphibians

Ulphia (also Ulphe, Olfe, Wulfe, Wolfia, or Wulfia and other variants; d. 8th century AD) of Amiens is a Christian saint, venerated particularly at Amiens. Her feast day is January 31.

== Legend ==
Ulphia was said to be a young girl living on the banks of the Noye, who was determined not to marry, despite having a number of suitors. She would feign madness in an effort to discourage them. At the age of twenty-five she received the veil from the Bishop of Amiens. She then retired to live as a hermit near what would become Saint-Acheul, near Amiens in the Kingdom of the Franks.

=== Friendship with St Domitius ===
There she met the elderly hermit Domitius. Baring-Gould said he was a canon of Amiens; Laurentius Surius says that Domitius was not a priest, but a deacon. He would stop at the door of her hut and they would walk to Matins together. No where was the grass so fine as where Ulphia of Picardy walked on her way to church. She looked after the aged hermit, and he provided spiritual guidance.

Her hermitage was located in a marshy wetland, inhabited by frogs whose loud croaking kept her up all night. One day, she was so tired that she slept through when Domitius knocked at her door, and he, thinking she had already gone on ahead, left without her. Legend states that Ulphia placed the frogs in the area around her under interdict as a result of their loud croaking, which kept her awake at nights.

A 19th century hagiographer noted that the frogs in the area around the oratory of Saint Ulphia were, indeed, very quiet. However, if these frogs were taken elsewhere, they became boisterous once again.

At the end of her life, she formed and directed a community of religious women at Amiens.

In iconography, she is depicted as a young nun seated in prayer on a rock with a frog in the pool near her.

== Artistic depictions ==
A statue of Ulphia stands in the north portal of west facade of Amiens Cathedral and a painting of Ulphia with Saint Domitius by the 19th century painter Jean de Franqueville, hangs inside the cathedral.

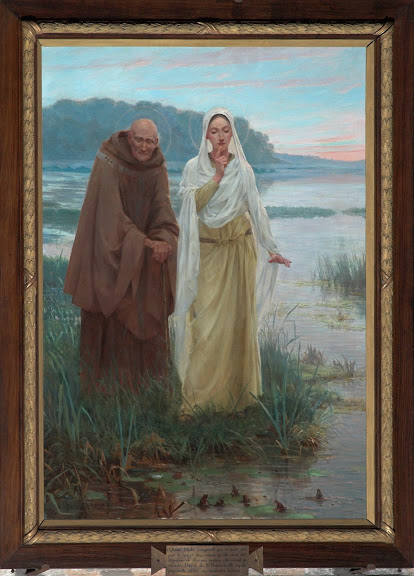
Saint Domice et Sainte Ulphe (1896) by Jean de Francqueville

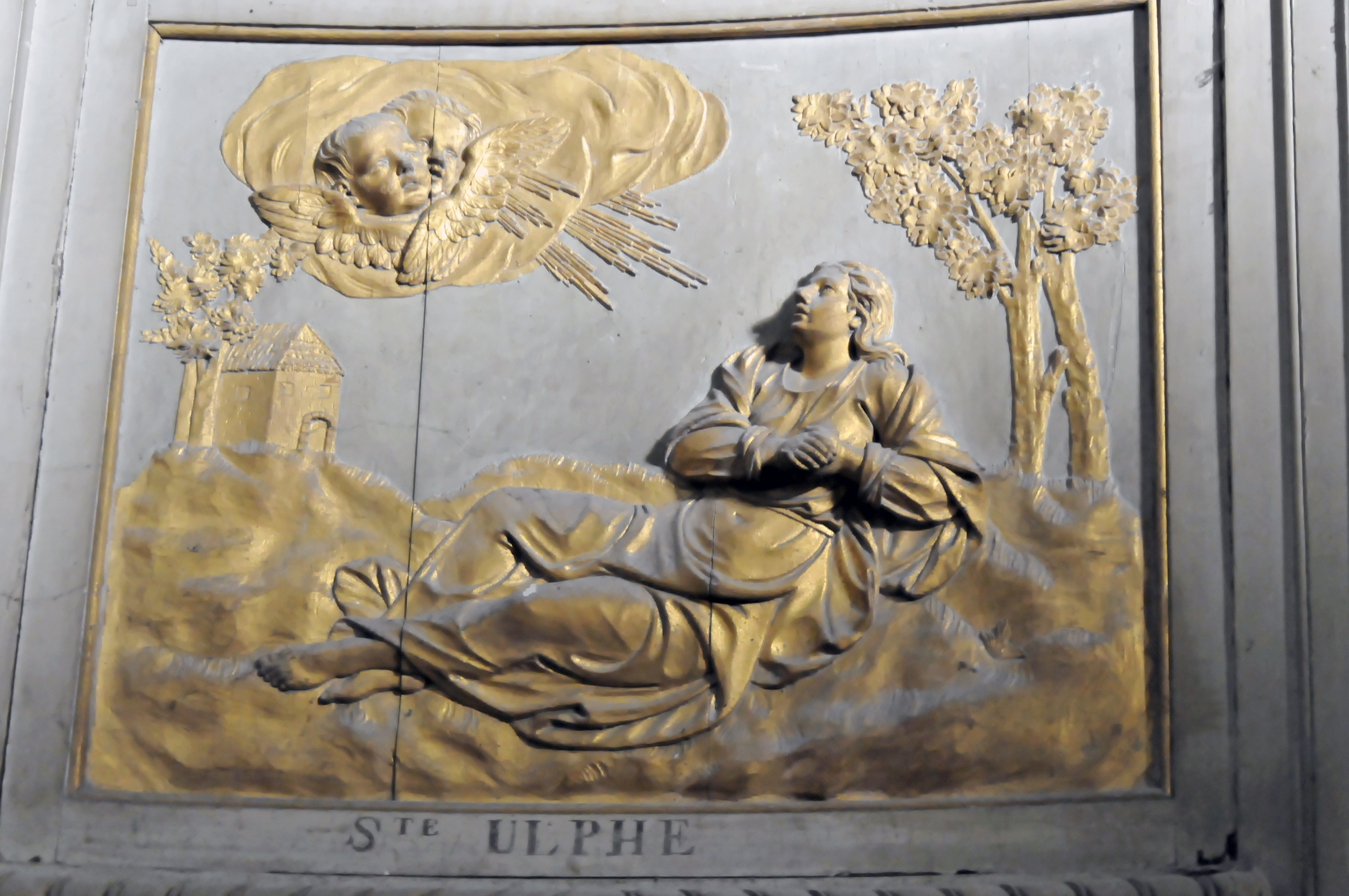
Bas relief located at Amiens Cathedral

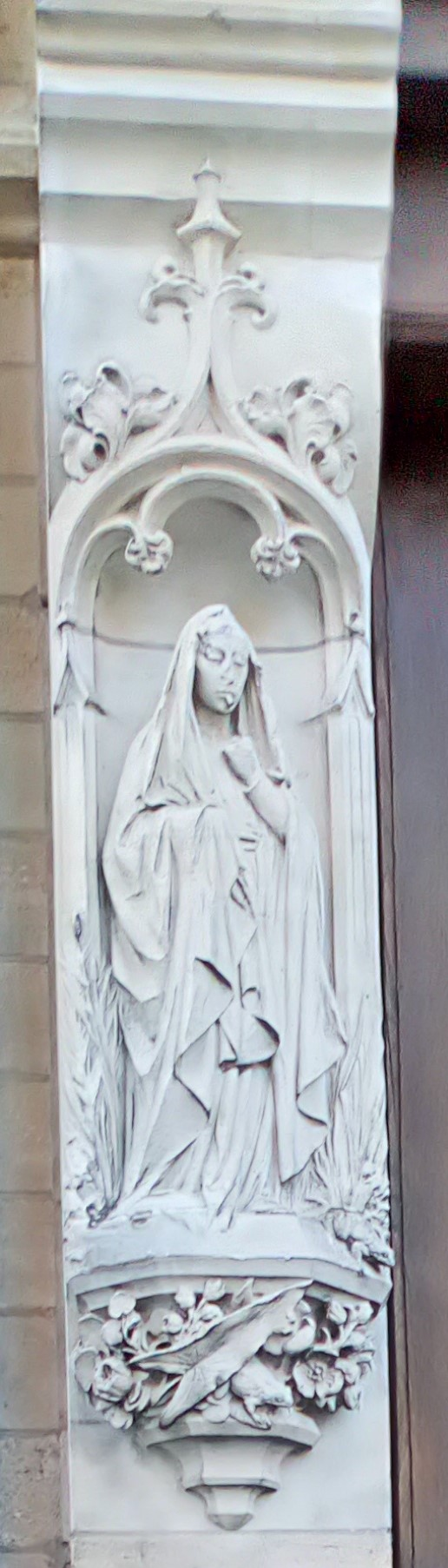
Statue by Albert Roze
